= List of Middlesex county cricketers to 1863 =

This is a list of cricketers who represented the Middlesex county team in historically important matches before the creation of Middlesex County Cricket Club in December 1863, and its formal constitution in February 1864. The county club played its first matches in the 1864 season, and this list is limited to those who played for the county until 1863. Some players listed here played for the county both before and after December 1863, so they also appear in List of Middlesex County Cricket Club players. For example, all seven brothers in the Walker family are in this list, and the four who played for the county club are in the other list as well.

This list uses the same layout style as the county club list with the player's usual name followed by the seasons he was active at county level, and then his name in scorecard format with any useful notes in brackets.

== Key ==
- † preceding a player's name means that the original article is now a redirect to this list.

== A ==
- Atkinson () : Atkinson

== B ==
- Briden (1826) : Briden
- A. Brooks () : A. Brooks

== C ==
- Christie () : Christie

== F ==
- Fidler () : Fidler

== G ==
- Guyett () : Guyett

== L ==
- Lewis () : Lewis
- Loftus () : Loftus
- Lowe () : Lowe

== M ==
- Main () : Main
- Miller () : Miller
- † Charles Mitford (1815) : C. Mitford

== P ==
- F. Parry () : F. Parry
- Picard () : Picard

== R ==
- Rose () : Rose

== S ==
- Smeed () : Smeed

== W ==
- Alfred Walker (1851–1859) : A. Walker
- Arthur Henry Walker (1859–1862) : A. H. Walker
- Frederic Walker (1859) : F. Walker
- Isaac Walker (1862–1863) : I. D. Walker (played for the county club 1864–1884)
- John Walker (1850–1863) : J. Walker (played for the county club 1864–1866)
- Russell Walker (1862) : R. D. Walker (played for the county club 1864–1877)
- Vyell Walker (1859–1863) : V. E. Walker (played for the county club 1864–1877)
- † William Wybrow (1830) : W. Wybrow

== Bibliography ==
- ACS (1981). A Guide to Important Cricket Matches Played in the British Isles 1709–1863. Nottingham: ACS. OCLC 85045528.
- Haygarth, Arthur (1996) [1862]. Scores & Biographies, Volume 1 (1744–1826). Kennington: Frederick Lillywhite. ISBN 978-19-00592-23-9.
- Haygarth, Arthur (1997) [1862]. Scores & Biographies, Volume 2 (1827–1840). Kennington: Frederick Lillywhite. ISBN 978-19-00592-23-9.
