= Curtis baronets of Cullands Grove (1802) =

The Curtis baronetcy, of Cullands Grove, Southgate in the County of Middlesex, was created in the Baronetage of the United Kingdom on 23 December 1802 for Sir William Curtis, 1st Baronet, the son of a wealthy London biscuit manufacturer. He was member of parliament for the City of London from 1790 to 1818 and 1820 to 1826 and Lord Mayor of London from 1794 to 1795. He was later offered a peerage but declined. The third Baronet moved the family seat to Caynham Court, Caynham, Shropshire in 1852 and was High Sheriff of Shropshire in 1857. The fourth and fifth Baronets were both succeeded by cousins. The Shropshire estate was sold following the death of the sixth Baronet. The family seat is now at Bishops Waltham, Hampshire

== Curtis baronets, of Cullands Grove (1802) ==
- Sir William Curtis, 1st Baronet (1752–1829)
- Sir William Curtis, 2nd Baronet (1782–1847)
- Sir William Curtis, 3rd Baronet (1804–1870)
- Sir William Michael Curtis, 4th Baronet (1859–1916)
- Sir Edgar Francis Egerton Curtis, 5th Baronet (1875–1943)
- Sir Peter Curtis, 6th Baronet (1907–1976)
- Sir William Peter Curtis, 7th Baronet (1935–2014)
- Sir Edward Philip Curtis, 8th Baronet (born 1940)

The heir apparent is the current holder's eldest son, George Edward Curtis (born 1980).

== Extended family ==
Several other members of the family have also gained distinction. William Frederick Curtis, eldest son of Timothy Abraham Curtis, third son of the first Baronet, was a lieutenant-general in the Army. Arthur Cecil Curtis, second son of George Lear Curtis, second son of the second Baronet, was a rear-admiral in the Royal Navy. His son Arthur Drury Curtis (1888–1950) was a brigadier in the Army. Reginald Curtis, third son of Charles Berwick Curtis, fourth son of the first Baronet, was a major-general in the Army and his eldest son, Sir Reginald Salmond Curtis (1863–1922) was a major-general in the Army and awarded a knighthood as KCMG for services in the Great War. Berwick Curtis (1876–1965), youngest son of Charles Berwick Curtis, was a vice-admiral in the Royal Navy.

== Notes ==
Baronetage of the United Kingdom
Preceded by Eardley baronets	Curtis baronets of Cullands Grove; 23 December 1802	Succeeded by Peacocke baronets
