= 1863 English cricket season =

Cricket season review

The 1863 English cricket season was the 37th, and last, of the roundarm era.

Fourteen inter-county fixtures were played among a total of 36 historically important/first-class matches. (Note: Any match listed in the ACS' Important Match Guide (1981) is historically important, and therefore of the highest standard, whether or not a scorecard might exist. The same applies to numerous matches discovered by researchers since 1981. For further information, see First-class cricket.) Three county clubs were founded in 1863—Yorkshire on 8 January, Hampshire on 12 August, and Middlesex on 15 December. Also, an organisation in Cheltenham is said to have been the forerunner of Gloucestershire County Cricket Club.

The All England Eleven and the United England Eleven were both active, playing several matches throughout the country. They also played each other at Lord's in May. Eight matches involved Marylebone Cricket Club (MCC), and other fixtures included North v South (four times), Gentlemen v Players (twice), and the University Match. Among the season's leading players were E. M. Grace, George Griffith, Jem Grundy, Tom Lockyer, Will Mortlock, H. H. Stephenson, Ned Willsher, and George Wootton.

== Important matches ==
- 1863 match list

== Events ==
=== Yorkshire ===
8 January. Foundation of Yorkshire County Cricket Club out of the Sheffield Match Fund Committee that had been established in 1861. Yorkshire played their first match against Surrey at the Oval on 4 to 6 June. It was a rain-affected draw, evenly balanced.

=== Hampshire ===
12 August. Foundation of Hampshire County Cricket Club. A number of previous county organisations including the famous Hambledon Club had existed in Hampshire during the previous hundred years or more, but none had survived indefinitely.

=== Middlesex ===
Middlesex County Cricket Club was founded at a meeting in the London Tavern on 15 December 1863, though formal constitution was not done until 2 February 1864. The creation of the club was done in response to "an outspoken demand", and largely through the efforts of the Walker family of Southgate. The famous all-rounder V. E. Walker became the club's first captain, and also, jointly with a Mr C. Hillyard, its first secretary. John Walker, one of VE's brothers, became the club's first president. The Walkers owned a large estate at Arnos Grove, and John founded the John Walker Cricket Ground, in Waterfall Road, Southgate. It is run today by the Walker Trust. The ground was "near the old Cattle Market, north of Islington". They were there for a short time only before moving to Lillie Bridge.

=== Gloucestershire ===
An organisation in Cheltenham is believed to have been the forerunner of Gloucestershire County Cricket Club, which had definitely been founded by 1871. Exact details of the club's foundation have been lost.

== Bibliography ==
- ACS (1981). A Guide to Important Cricket Matches Played in the British Isles 1709–1863. Nottingham: ACS. OCLC 85045528.
