= Oakbeams =

Coordinates: 51°37′28″N 0°07′34″W

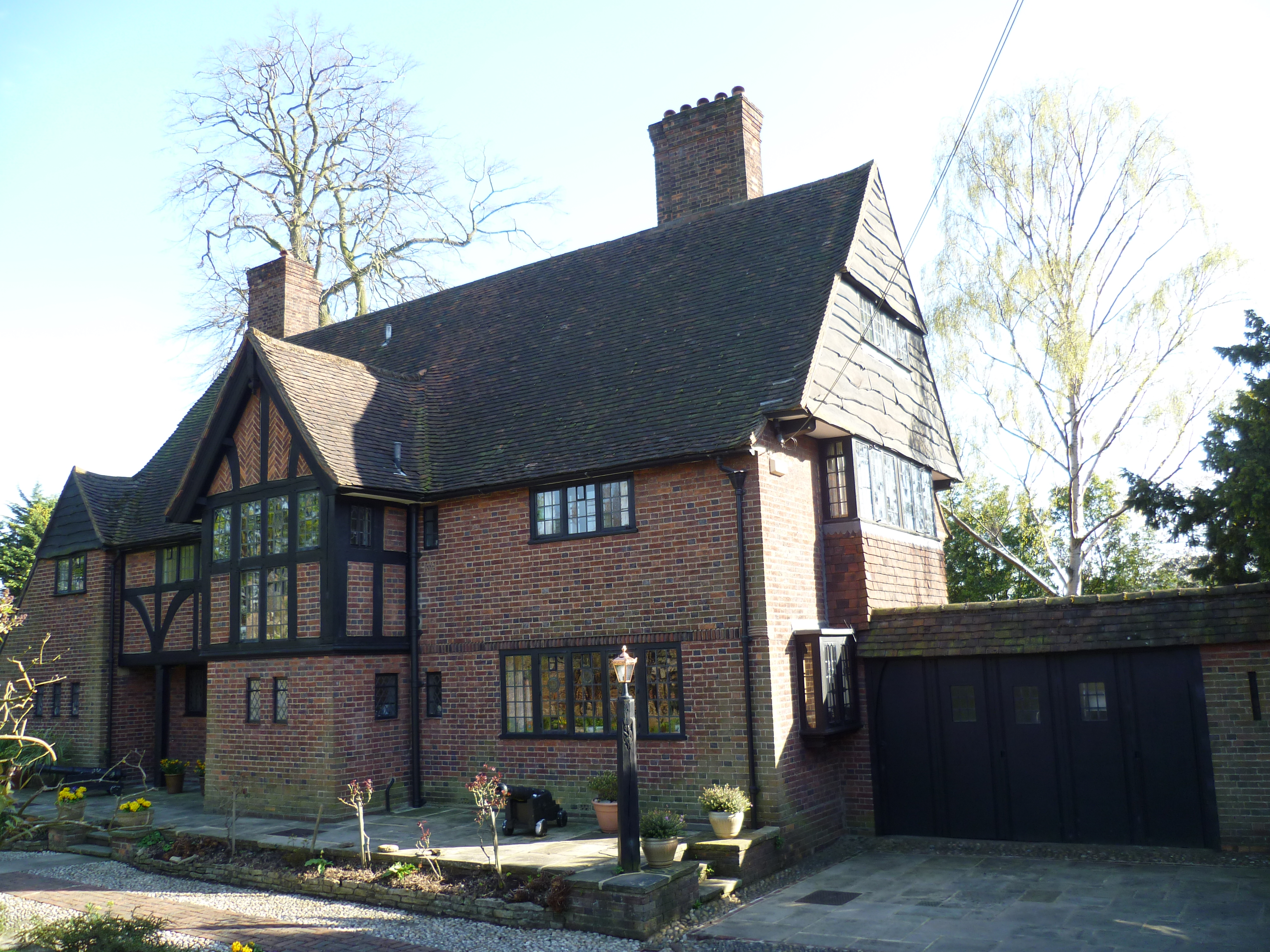
Oakbeams

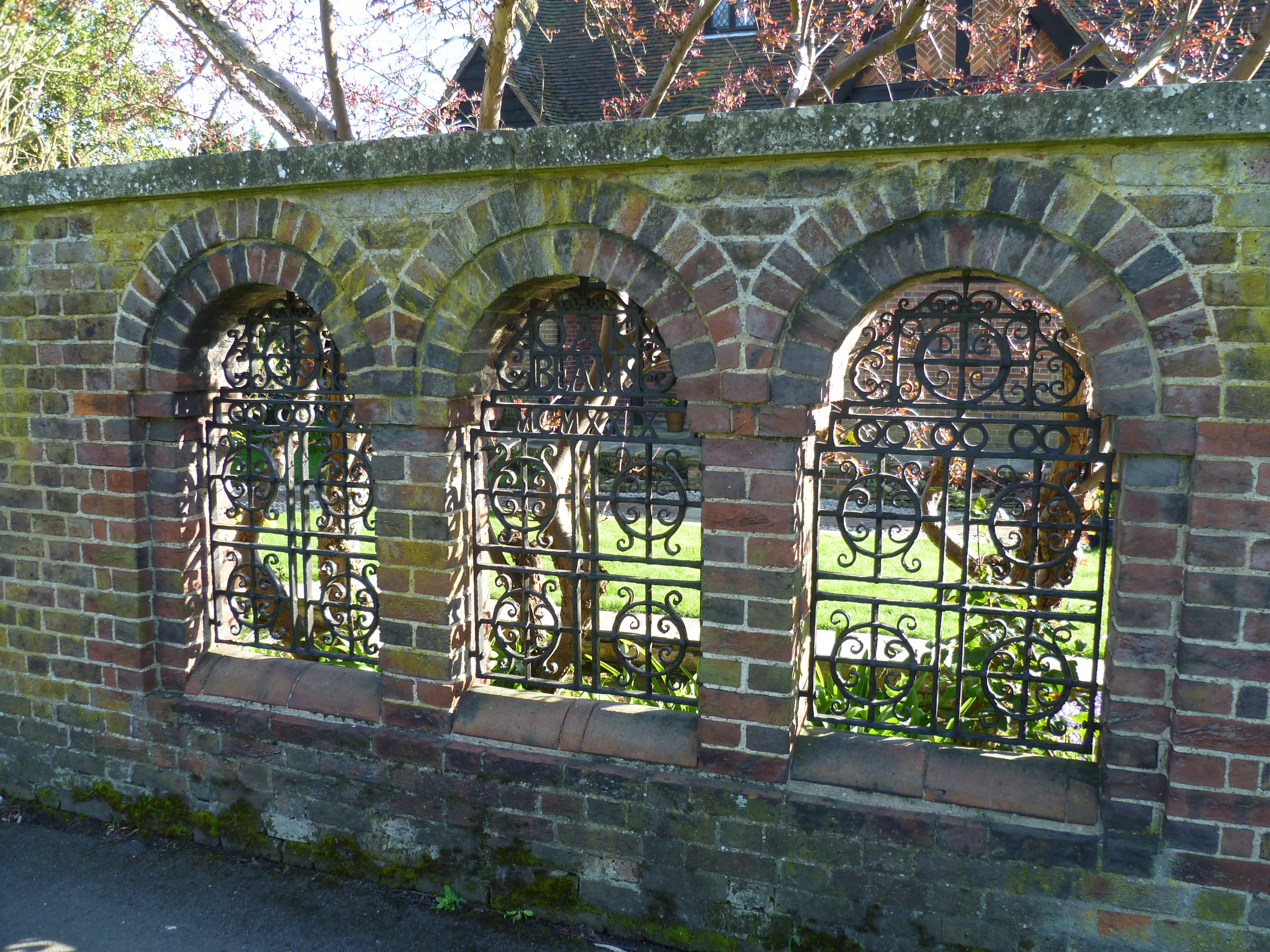
The grade II listing includes the surrounding walls.

Oakbeams is a grade II listed house on The Green, Southgate, London. Built in 1929–31, it was designed by architect Paul Badcock for George Cole, a graphic designer and artist's agent. Historic England describe Oakbeams as "an unusually elaborate example of a 'Stockbroker Tudor' inter-war suburban house".

The listing includes the surrounding walls and ironwork which includes the words "OAKBEAMS MCMXXIX" in the upper central panel.

== See also ==
- 40 The Green, Southgate
- Stockbroker Tudor
