= Southgate House =

Coordinates: 51.6295°N 0.1267°W

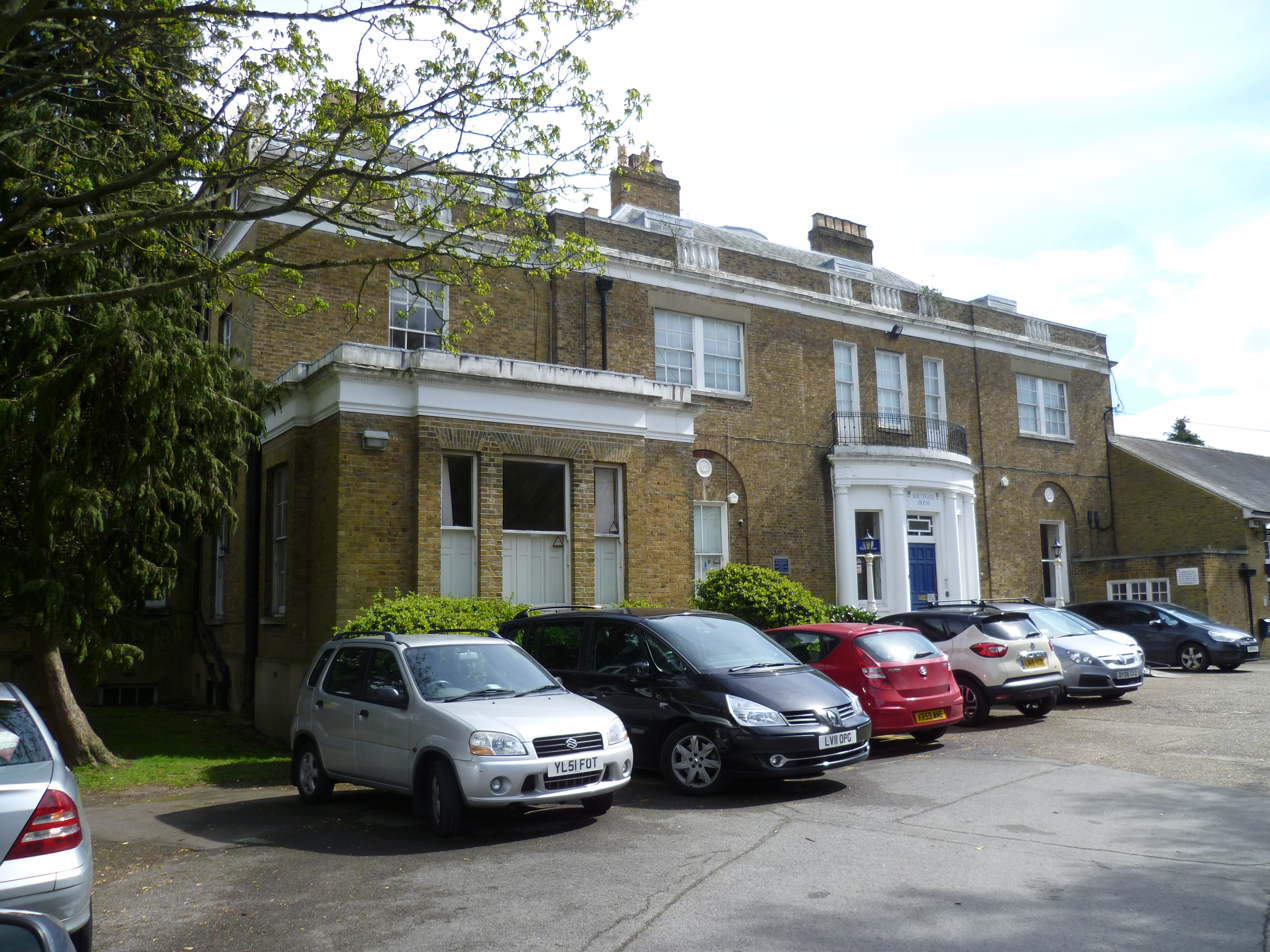
Southgate House

Southgate House is a grade II* listed building in Southgate, London. Built in the late 18th century, it was once the home of Isaac Walker, father of the Walker brothers, and later of John Lawrence, 1st Baron Lawrence.

From 1924 to 1987 it formed part of Minchenden School. It has since been part of Barnet and Southgate College.

== See also ==
- Arnos Grove house, known for a time as "Southgate House".
