= Russell Walker =

English cricketer, cricket administrator, and barrister

Russell Donnithorne Walker (13 February 1842 – 29 March 1922) was an English cricketer, barrister and cricket administrator.

Russell Walker was born in Southgate, Middlesex. He was the sixth of seven cricket playing brothers, who were influential in the establishing of the Middlesex County Cricket Club in 1864. Their cricket ground at Southgate is maintained by the Walker Trust to this day.

He played as a right-handed batsman and a round arm slow right arm bowler for Oxford University (1861–1865), a Middlesex XI (1862), Marylebone Cricket Club (MCC) (1862–1878) and Middlesex County Cricket Club (1864–1877).

After graduating from Oxford (where he was at Brasenose College) in 1865, he studied law at Lincoln's Inn and was called to the bar in 1871. He succeeded his brother Edward as President of Middlesex and served in this role from 1907 until his death at Regent's Park, aged 80.

== See also ==
- The Walkers of Southgate
