= Isaac Walker (merchant) =

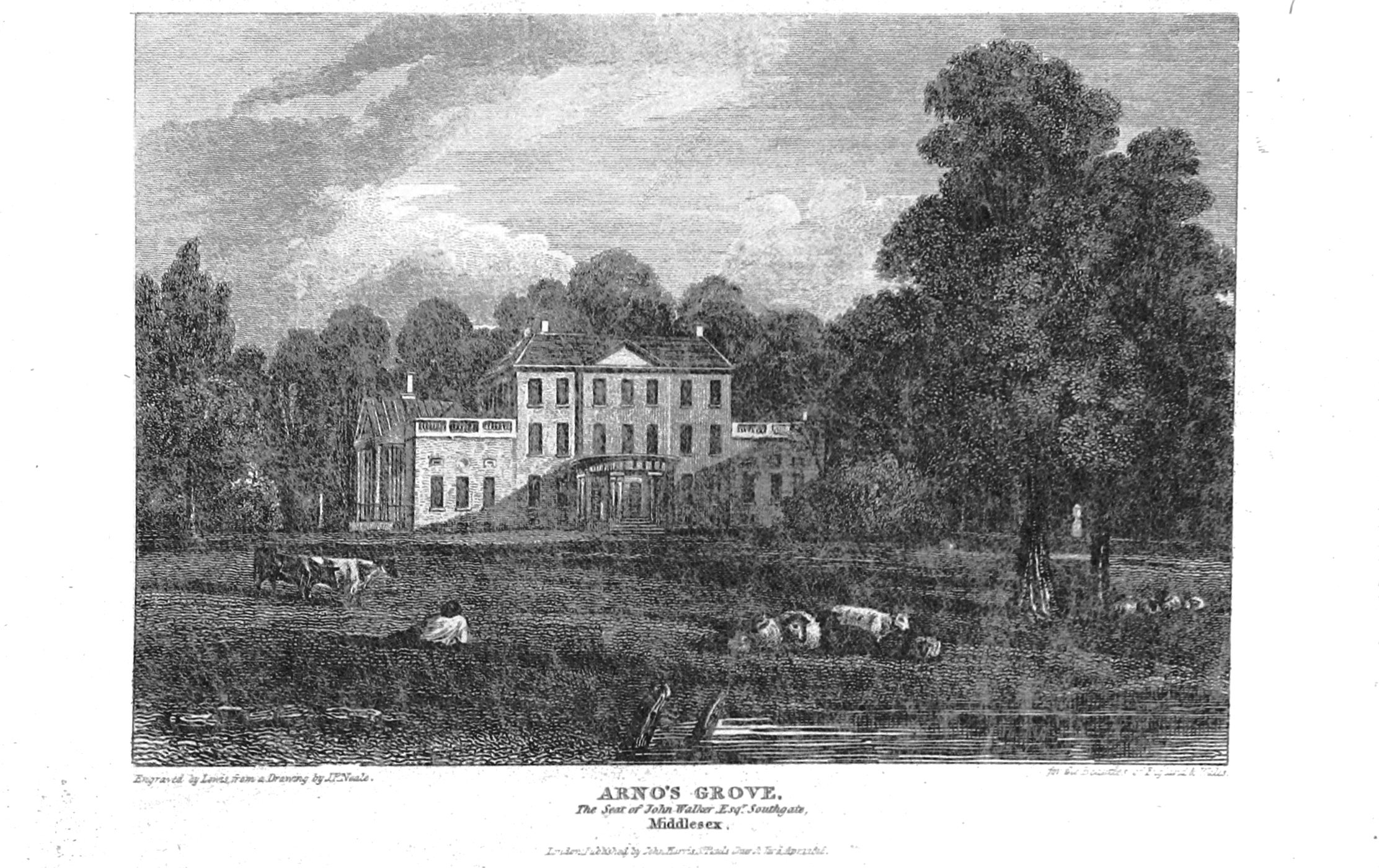
Arno's Grove house in the early 1800s.

Isaac Walker (1725 - 1804) was a prosperous linen merchant in Southgate, Middlesex, who bought the house known as Arno's Grove in 1777 (which gave its name to the area known as Arnos Grove) and was the founder of a dynasty that was important in the development of Southgate and Arnos Grove.

== Family and personal life ==
He was the father of merchant John Walker, the grandfather of brewer Isaac Walker, entomologist Francis Walker and cricketer Henry Walker, and the great-grandfather of The Walkers of Southgate.

Walker suffered badly from gout and often spent time in Bath, England where he would take advantage of their Hydrothermal Bathing.

== Social life ==
He was a member of the Society of Friends at Winchmore Hill.
