= Charles Brune =

Charles Brune may refer to:

- Charles Brune (cricketer) (1843–1877), 19th-century amateur cricketer
- Charles Brune (politician) (1891–1956), French veterinarian and politician
