= Isaac Walker (cricketer) =

English cricketer

Personal information
- Full name: Isaac Donnithorne Walker
- Born: 8 January 1844; Southgate, Middlesex, England
- Died: 6 July 1898 (aged 54); Regent's Park, London, England
- Batting: Right-handed
- Bowling: Right arm slow (underarm)

Domestic team information
- Years: Team
- 1862–1884: Middlesex
- 1862–1884: Marylebone Cricket Club (MCC)
- 1864–1876: Gentlemen of the South

Career statistics
Competition	First-class
Matches	294
Runs scored	11400
Batting average	24.51
100s/50s	7/60
Top score	179
Balls bowled	9964
Wickets	218
Bowling average	22.11
5 wickets in innings	9
10 wickets in match	1
Best bowling	6/42
Catches/stumpings	250/3
- Source: Cricket Archive, 8 January 2016

Isaac Donnithorne Walker (8 January 1844 – 6 July 1898) was an English cricketer.

Walker was born in Southgate, London, the youngest of seven cricket-playing brothers. The family were part-owners of Taylor Walker & Co brewery in Limehouse.

He was a right-handed batsman and an underarm slow right-arm bowler. He played for Marylebone Cricket Club (MCC) (1862–1884), a Middlesex XI (1862–1863) and Middlesex County Cricket Club (1864–1884). He succeeded his brother Edward as captain of Middlesex in 1873 and served in the post for twelve seasons.

His family's cricket ground at Southgate is maintained by the Walker Trust to this day. He died at Regent's Park, aged 54. His estate was valued at £195,483.

Sporting positions
Preceded by Edward Walker	Middlesex County Cricket Captain; 1873–1884	Succeeded by Alexander Webbe
