= Cullands Grove =

Coordinates: 51.621°N 0.121°W

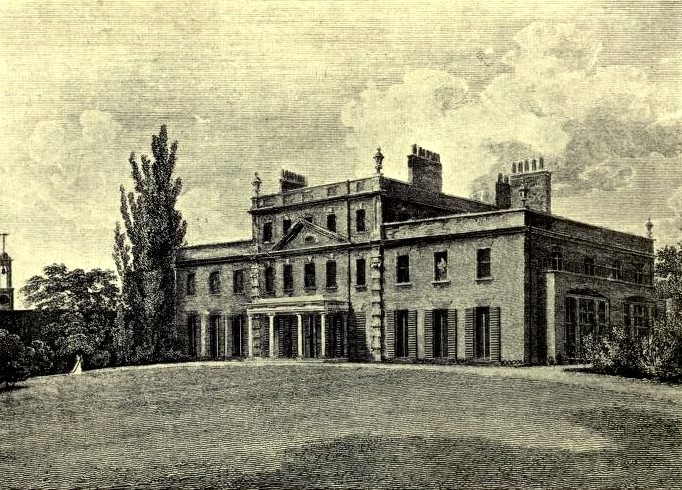
- Cullands Grove, Southgate, 1801 from The Home Counties Magazine, 1909
- Interactive map of the Cullands Grove area

General information
- Type: Country house and estate
- Architectural style: Neoclassical
- Location: Southgate, Middlesex, England
- Completed: 18th century
- Demolished: c. 1840

Technical details
- Grounds: 70 acres

Design and construction
- Known for: Banquets given by Sir William Curtis, Bart.

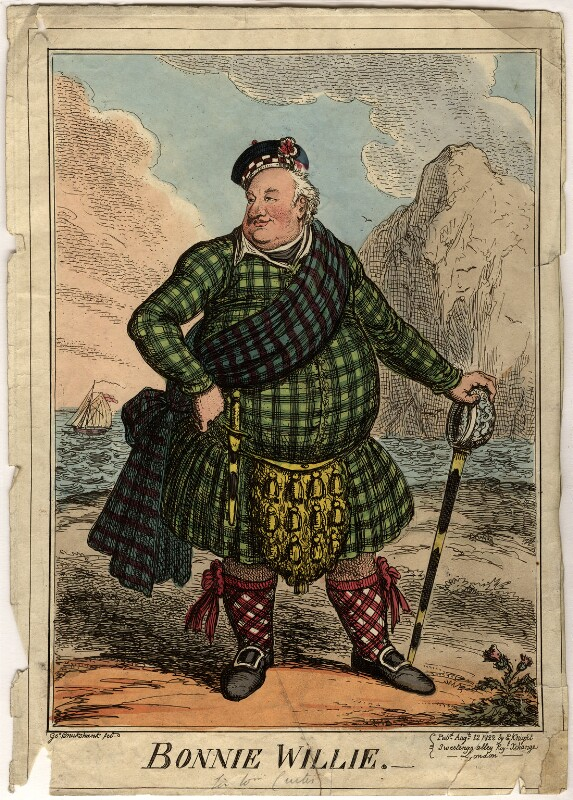
Sir William Curtis 1st Baronet as Bonnie Willie. George Cruikshank, 1822.

Cullands Grove, also known as Cannon's, was a country house and estate in Southgate, Middlesex. It was built on an area of woodland formerly known as Gullands Grove. Cullands Grove was known for the lavish banquets held there by Sir William Curtis 1st Baronet of Cullands Grove and after his death in 1829 it took a week to auction the contents of the house and estate which included 370 dozen bottles of wine. Around 1840, the estate was merged into the Grovelands estate and the house demolished.

== Location ==
Cullands Grove house and estate stood in an area of former woodland, north of where Alderman's Hill now lies, on the corner with Cannon Hill, on the road from Southgate to Palmers Green in the county of Middlesex. It was of about 70 acres (28 ha).

== History ==
In the mid 18th century, possibly in 1754, the insurance broker Stephen Godin bought a Southgate woodland known as Gullands Grove from Walter Henshaw and Henry Hadley.

At some time in the 18th century a house was built on the land that became known as Cullands Grove. It has been described as being in the classical revival (neoclassical) style. Stephen Godin lived there from at least 1754 until his death in 1787 when the estate was purchased by the businessman and politician Sir William Curtis, 1st Baronet (1752–1829).

Curtis was known for his lavish banquets at which King George IV was sometimes a guest. Curtis and George visited Scotland together wearing kilts, although both were born in London, which provided material for the cartoonists of the day. Described by the authors of The History of Parliament as "a portly and bottlenosed bon vivant", Curtis was said to be very proud of his wine cellar and his kitchens which featured a gallery so that guests could see their dinner being prepared.

Curtis has been described as a "friend" of the British East India Company and in 1802 they named one of their ships Culland's Grove.

After Curtis's death, the entire contents of the house and the associated farm were sold in 1832 in an auction that took a week to complete. It included 1,114 lots and raised £4,332. The wine was sold in 370 dozens and contributed over £1,200 to the total. Among the contents of his cellar were port (Boland's Post, 1808), claret, East India Madeira, sherry (Wild's), Malaga, Hock from Bremen (1726), and beer. In addition to the furniture and agricultural equipment, livestock, and produce, offered for sale were two Shetland Ponies, a fire engine, and two "humane man traps".

Around 1840 the estate was purchased by John Donnithorne Taylor. He merged the grounds into his adjoining Grovelands estate and demolished the house.

== See also ==
- Arnos Grove house
- Minchington Hall
