= Charles Brune (cricketer) =

Cricketer (1843–1877)

Personal information
- Full name: Charles Julius Brune
- Born: 16 April 1843; Matanzas, Cuba
- Died: 13 January 1877 (aged 33); Boulogne, France
- Batting: Right-handed
- Bowling: Right-arm medium-fast (round-arm)
- Role: Bowler

Domestic team information
- Years: Team
- 1866–1870: Cambridge University
- 1866–1875: Middlesex
- 1868–1875: Marylebone Cricket Club

Career statistics
Competition	FC
Matches	56
Runs scored	738
Batting average	10.39
100s/50s	0/0
Top score	41
Balls bowled	5,097
Wickets	107
Bowling average	17.49
5 wickets in innings	6
10 wickets in match	1
Best bowling	8/31
Catches/stumpings	21/-
- Source: CricketArchive, 13 February 2013

Charles Julius Brune (16 April 1843 – 13 January 1877) was a 19th-century amateur cricketer. Born in Matanzas, Cuba, Brune first boarded at Godolphin School in Hammersmith, London, and later progressed to the University of Cambridge, where he attended Caius and Downing Colleges. Having played for an All England Eleven as early as the 1863 season, whilst at Cambridge he was a regular player for the university's cricket team, playing fourteen first-class and numerous other matches for the side between 1866 and 1870. A medium-fast round-arm bowler, Brune was quite successful in his appearances for Cambridge, taking 57 wickets at an average of 14.28, including four five-wicket hauls. His best bowling figures, 8/31, came against the Marylebone Cricket Club (MCC) during the 1869 season, while in the 1867 edition of The University Match (held annually against Oxford), he took 5/64.

Brune had first played county matches for Middlesex during the 1866 season, and was a regular player for the side into the early 1870s. Later becoming a member of the MCC, he also played regularly for composite and regional teams, as well as local club teams. As the holder of amateur status, Brune occasionally featured in "Gentlemen" sides, making an appearance for "Gentlemen of the South" during the 1875 season, a team captained by W. G. Grace. His last appearance at first-class level was that year's edition of the Gentlemen v. Players fixture; he did not bowl during the game, with Grace and his cousin, Walter Gilbert, taking 17 wickets. Brune died at Boulogne, France, in January 1877, aged 33.
