= Eardley baronets =

Extinct baronetcy in the Baronetage of the United Kingdom

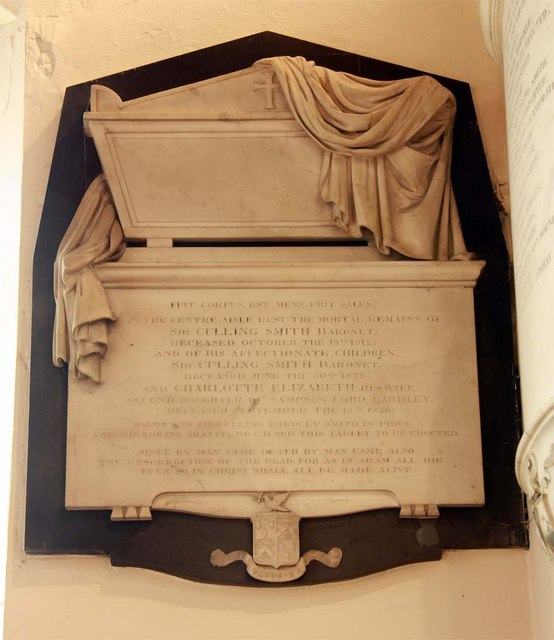
Culling Smith monument at St Mary the Virgin, Monken Hadley.

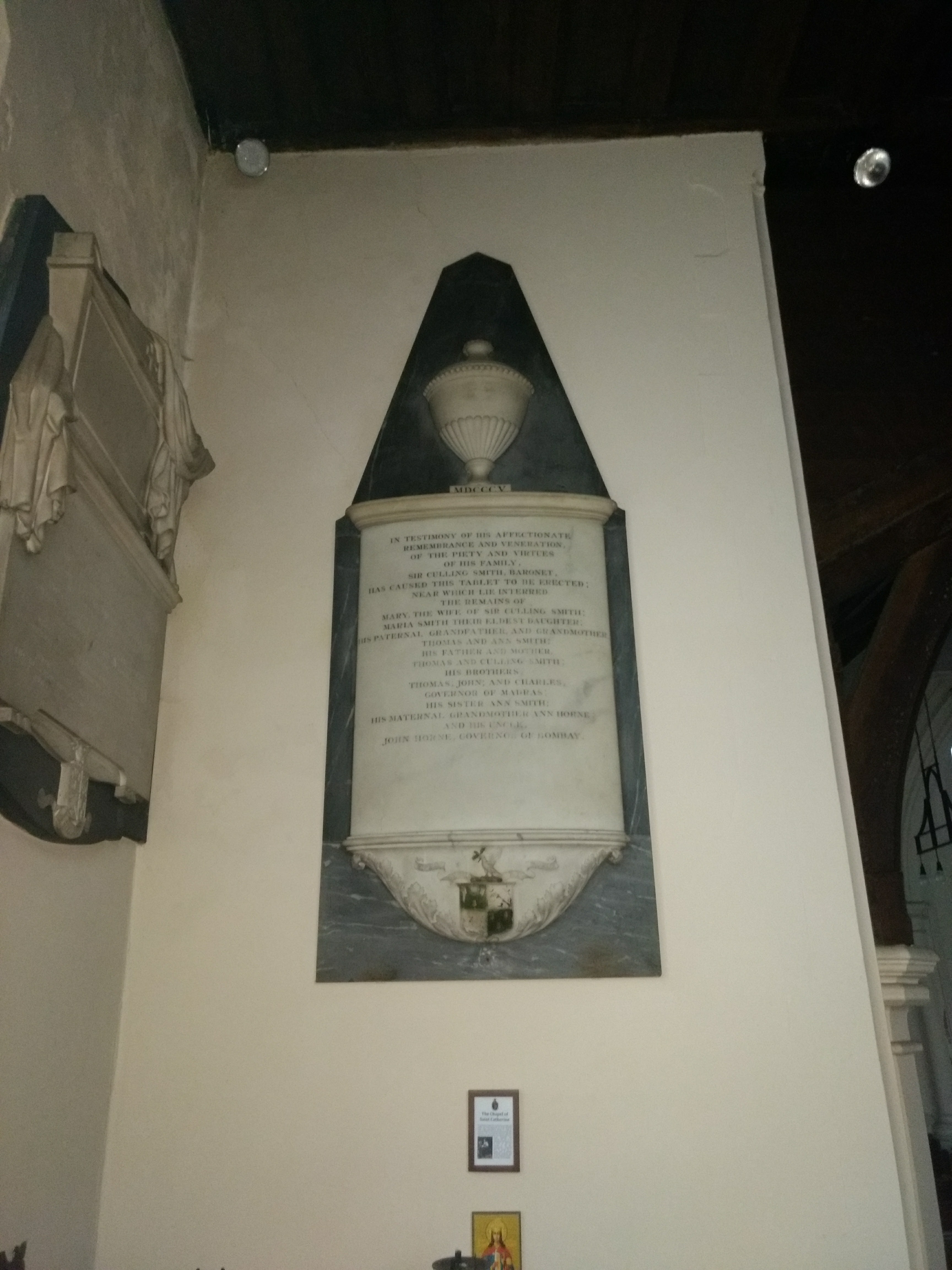
Culling Smith monument at St Mary the Virgin, Monken Hadley.

The Smith, later Eardley Baronetcy, of Hadley in the County of Middlesex, was a title in the Baronetage of the United Kingdom. It was created on 22 December 1802 for Culling Smith. He was the son of Thomas Smith, a London merchant. The second Baronet married the Honourable Charlotte Elizabeth, daughter of Sampson Eardley, 1st Baron Eardley. Their son, the third Baronet, assumed by Royal licence the surname of Eardley in lieu of his patronymic in 1847. He was a Christian campaigner for religious freedom and for Protestant causes. The title became extinct at the death of his son, the fourth Baronet, in 1875.

Mariah Charlotte Smith, daughter of the second Baronet, married Reverend Eardley Childers Walbanke-Childers and was the mother of politician Hugh Childers.

== Smith, later Eardley baronets, of Hadley (1802) ==
- Sir Culling Smith, 1st Baronet (1731–1812)
- Sir Culling Smith, 2nd Baronet (1768–1829)
- Sir Culling Eardley Eardley, 3rd Baronet (1805–1863)
- Sir Eardley Gideon Culling Eardley, 4th Baronet (1838–1875)

Baronetage of the United Kingdom
Preceded by Metcalfe baronets	Eardley baronets of Hadley; 22 December 1802	Succeeded by Curtis baronets
