= Arthur Henry Walker =

English cricketer

Arthur Henry Walker (30 June 1833 – 4 October 1878) was an English cricketer.

Walker was born in Southgate and he was the fourth of seven cricket playing brothers - the Walkers of Southgate. He played first-class cricket as a right-handed batsman and a round-arm right-arm bowler for Marylebone Cricket Club (MCC) (1855–1861) and a Middlesex XI (1859–1862). He died in Arnos Grove, aged 45.

He was educated at Harrow School for whom he played cricket.
