= Sandford House & Norbury House =

Coordinates: 51.6255°N 0.1242°W

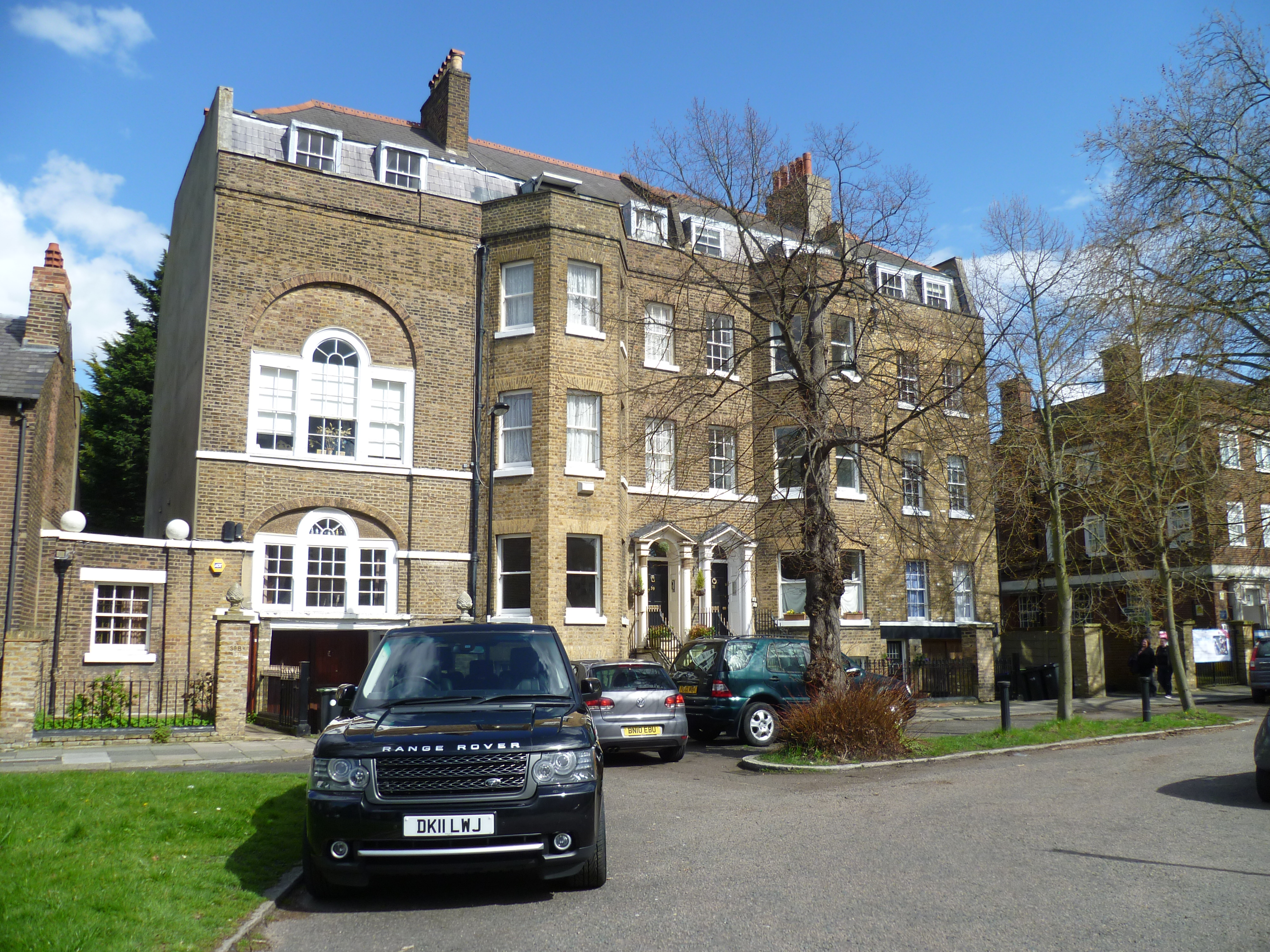
Sandford House and Norbury House

Sandford House and Norbury House are grade II listed buildings on The Green, Southgate, London. The houses date from the late eighteenth century with later additions.

== See also ==
- 40 The Green, Southgate
