= Peacocke baronets =

Title in United Kingdom Baronetage

The Peacocke Baronetcy, of Grange in the County of Limerick and of Barntinck in the County of Clare, was a title in the Baronetage of the United Kingdom. It was created on 24 December 1802 for Sir Joseph Peacocke, of Grange, County Limerick. Sir Joseph was the son of George Peacocke Esq. and his wife Mary (Levett) Peacocke, daughter of Joseph Levett, Alderman, of Cork, Ireland. The title became extinct on the death of his grandson, the third Baronet, in 1876.

== Peacocke baronets, of Grange and Barntinck (1802) ==
- Sir Joseph Peacocke, 1st Baronet (died 1812)
- Sir Nathaniel Levett Peacocke, 2nd Baronet (1769–1847)
- Sir Joseph Francis Peacocke, 3rd Baronet (1805–1876)

== Arms ==
Coat of arms of Peacocke baronets
Notes Granted 14 December 1802 by Sir Chichester Fortescue, Ulster King of Arms. Crest A cockatrice with wings endorsed Proper. Escutcheon Quarterly Or and Azure a cross of four lozenges between as many annulets counterchanged. Motto Vincit Veritas

Baronetage of the United Kingdom
Preceded by Curtis baronets	Peacocke baronets of Grange and Barntinck; 24 December 1802	Succeeded by de Capell-Brooke baronets
