= Valentine Poole houses, Southgate =

Coordinates: 51°37′30″N 0°07′26″W

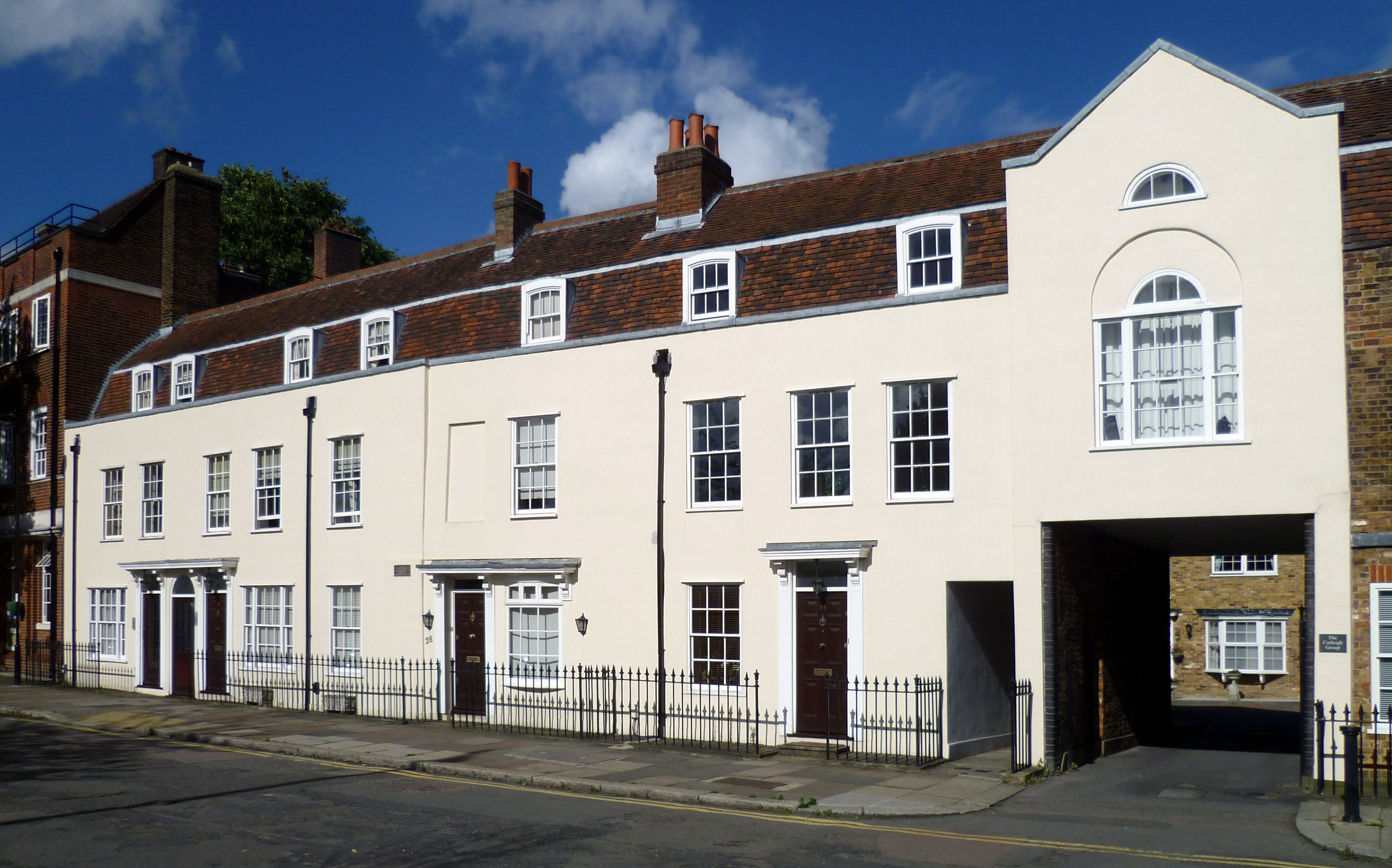
North end of the terrace.

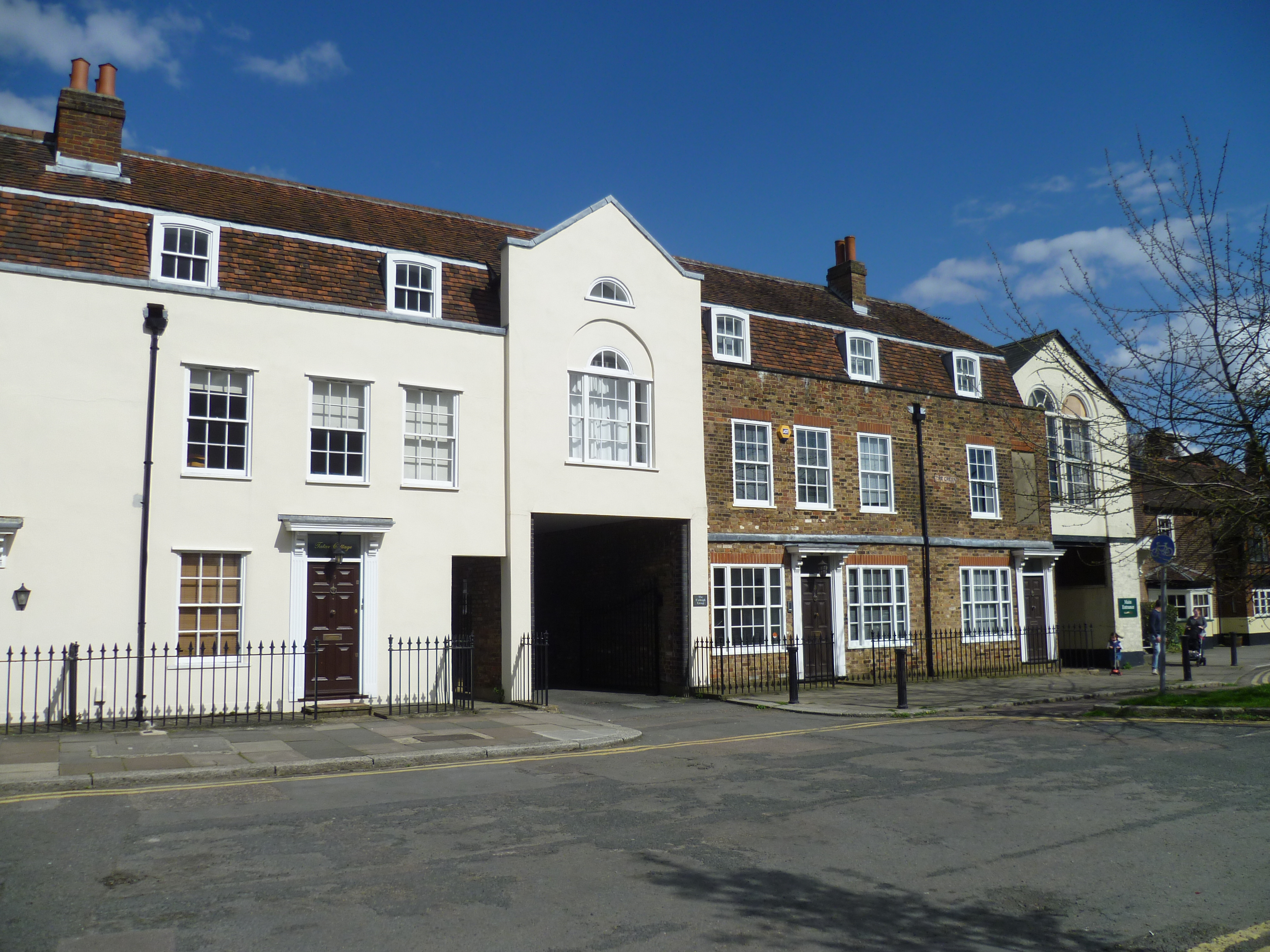
South end of the terrace.

The Valentine Poole houses are a terrace of grade II listed houses on The Green, Southgate, London. The houses were built in 1780 by the Valentine Poole Trust for the poor of Barnet. The architect was Michael Searles. The buildings were saved from demolition by Southgate Civic Trust and renovated by Peake Estates Limited in 1981.
