= Frederic Walker (cricketer) =

English cricketer

Frederic Walker (4 December 1829 – 20 December 1889) was an English cricketer.

Walker was born in Southgate, Middlesex and was the third of seven cricket playing brothers – the Walkers of Southgate. He was educated at Trinity College, Cambridge. He played first-class cricket as a right-handed batsman and wicketkeeper for Cambridge University (1849–1852), Marylebone Cricket Club (MCC) (1853–1856) and a Middlesex XI in 1859. He died in Arnos Grove, aged 60.
