= Henry Walker (cricketer) =

English cricketer

Henry Walker (3 October 1807 – 7 November 1872) was an English cricketer.

He was born in Southgate and played between 1832 and 1841, mainly for Marylebone Cricket Club (MCC). His seven nephews (the Walkers of Southgate) also played.
