= Ye Olde Cherry Tree =

Pub in Southgate, London

Coordinates: 51.6248°N 0.1235°W

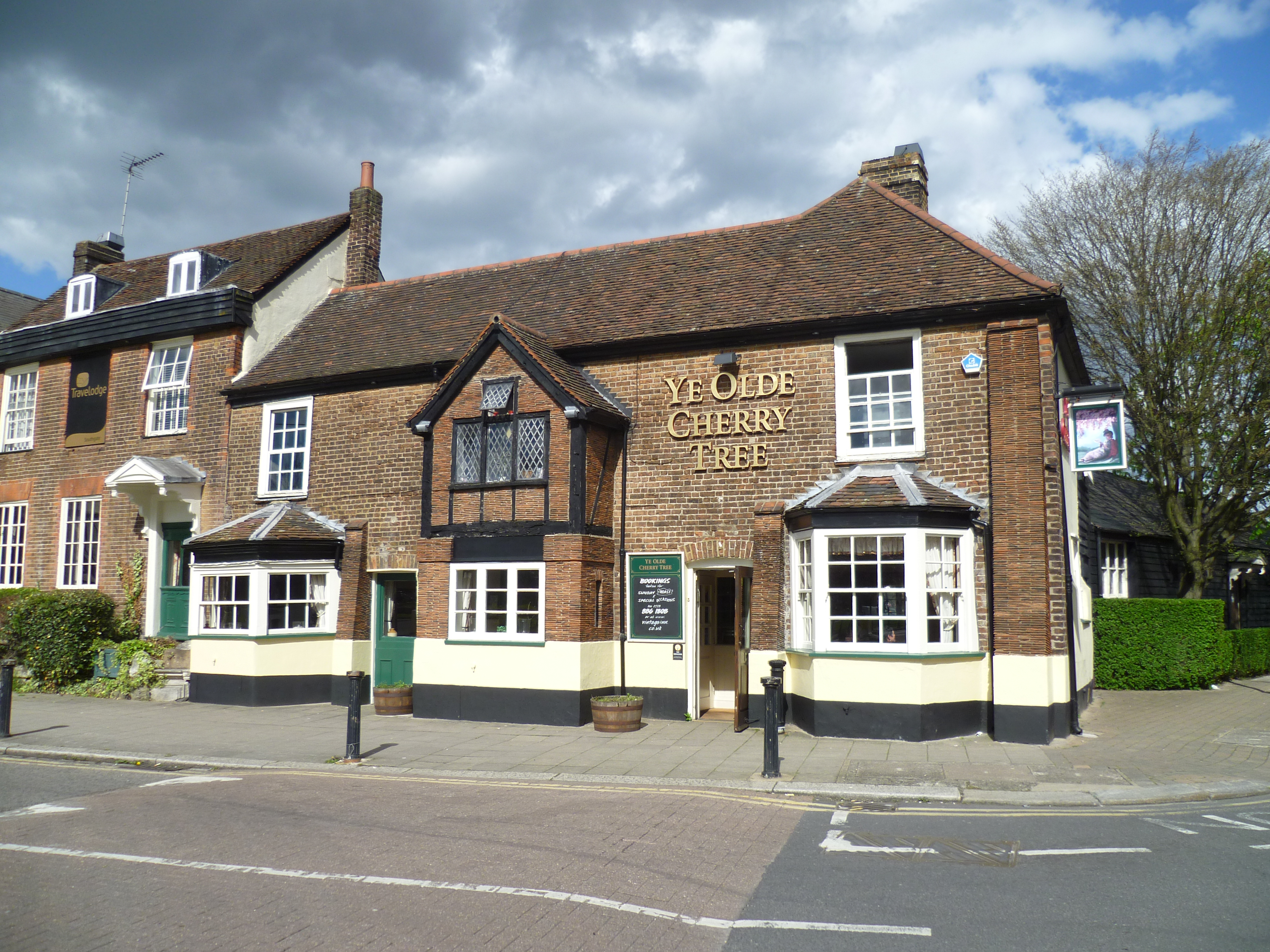
Ye Olde Cherry Tree

Browns Southgate (previously Ye Olde Cherry Tree) is a grade II listed public house on the corner of The Green and The Mall in Southgate, north London, which dates from around 1695.

== History ==
The Cherry Tree was built around 1695. It has since been altered and extended and is composed of a variety of materials which date from the 17th to the 19th centuries. It is grade II listed with Historic England.

The first landlord was Edward Lomas. It was known for its skittles alley and was the meeting place for several friendly societies, including the Loyal Britain society, which met there from 1800 to 1833.

Southgate's football club (founded c. 1883) played on the field behind the pub.

== Telephone kiosk ==
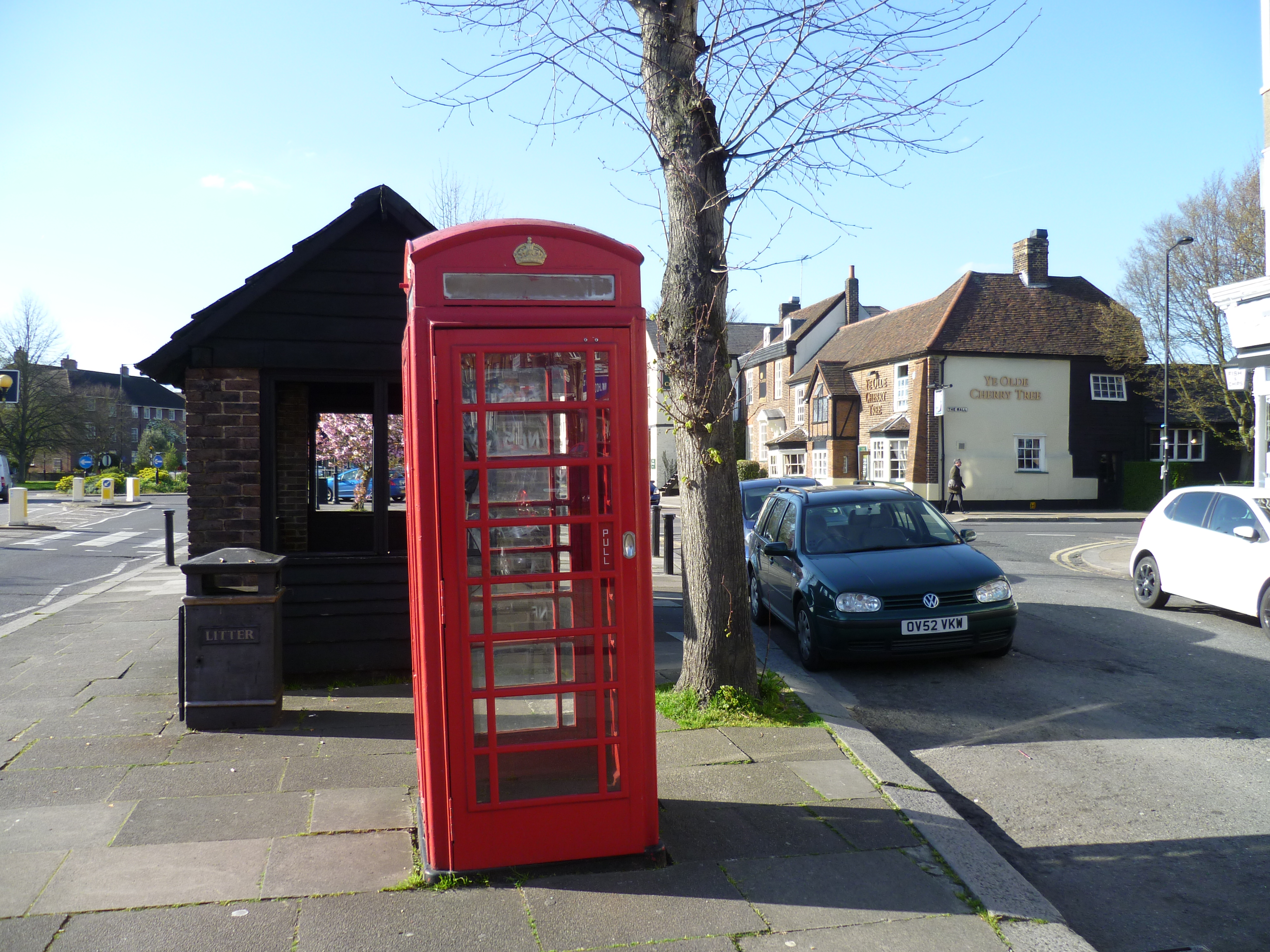
The nearby grade II listed K6 telephone kiosk.

Nearby is a grade II listed K6 telephone kiosk designed in 1935 by Sir Giles Gilbert Scott.

== See also ==
- List of pubs in London
