= Southgate Methodist Church =

Church in London, England

Coordinates: 51.6318°N 0.1238°W

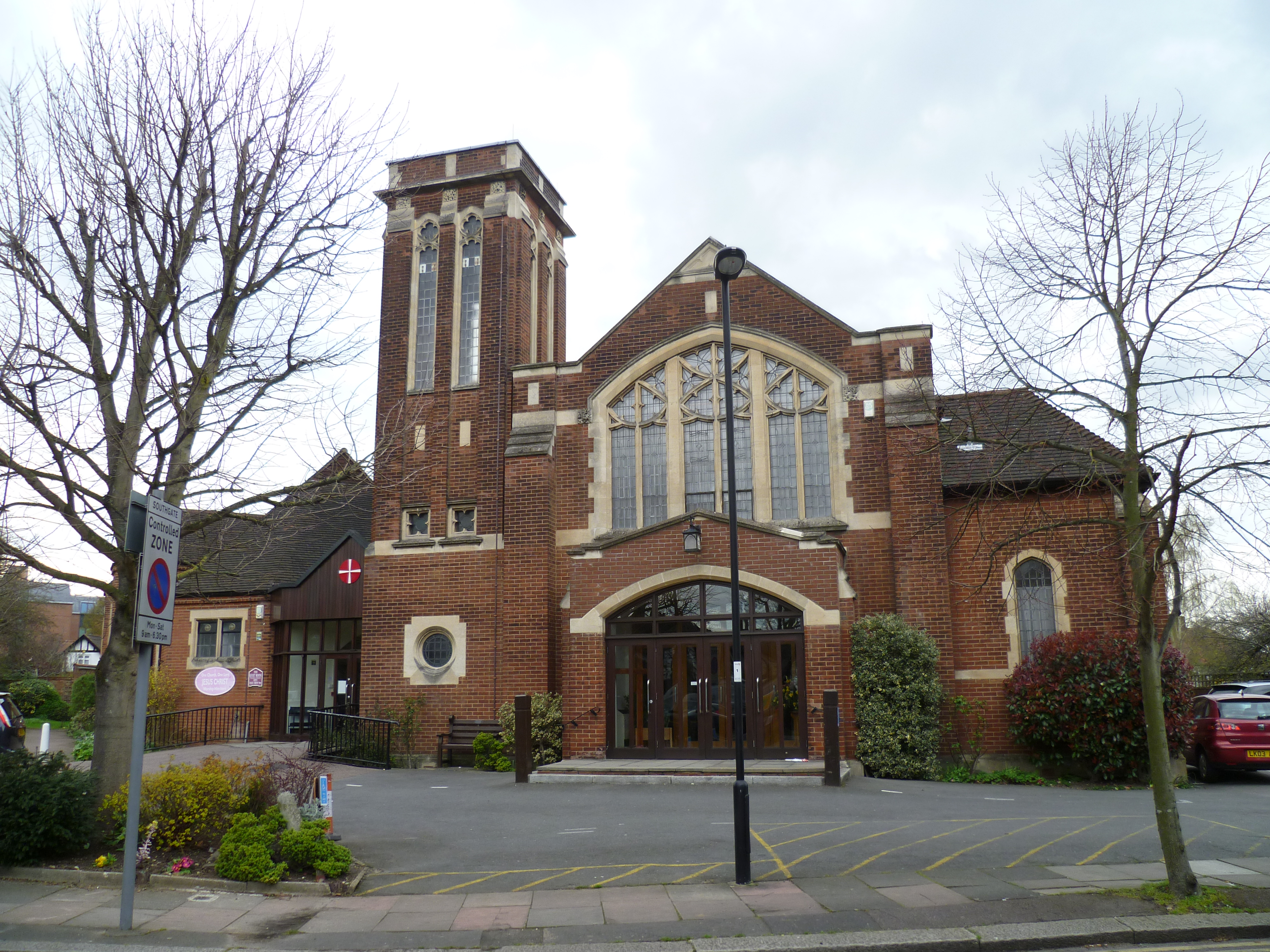
Southgate Methodist Church

Southgate Methodist Church is a Methodist church in The Bourne, Southgate, north London. The church was built in 1929, replacing a building on Chase Side.
