= Arnos Grove house =

Building in Southgate, London, England

Coordinates: 51°37′23″N 0°07′24″W

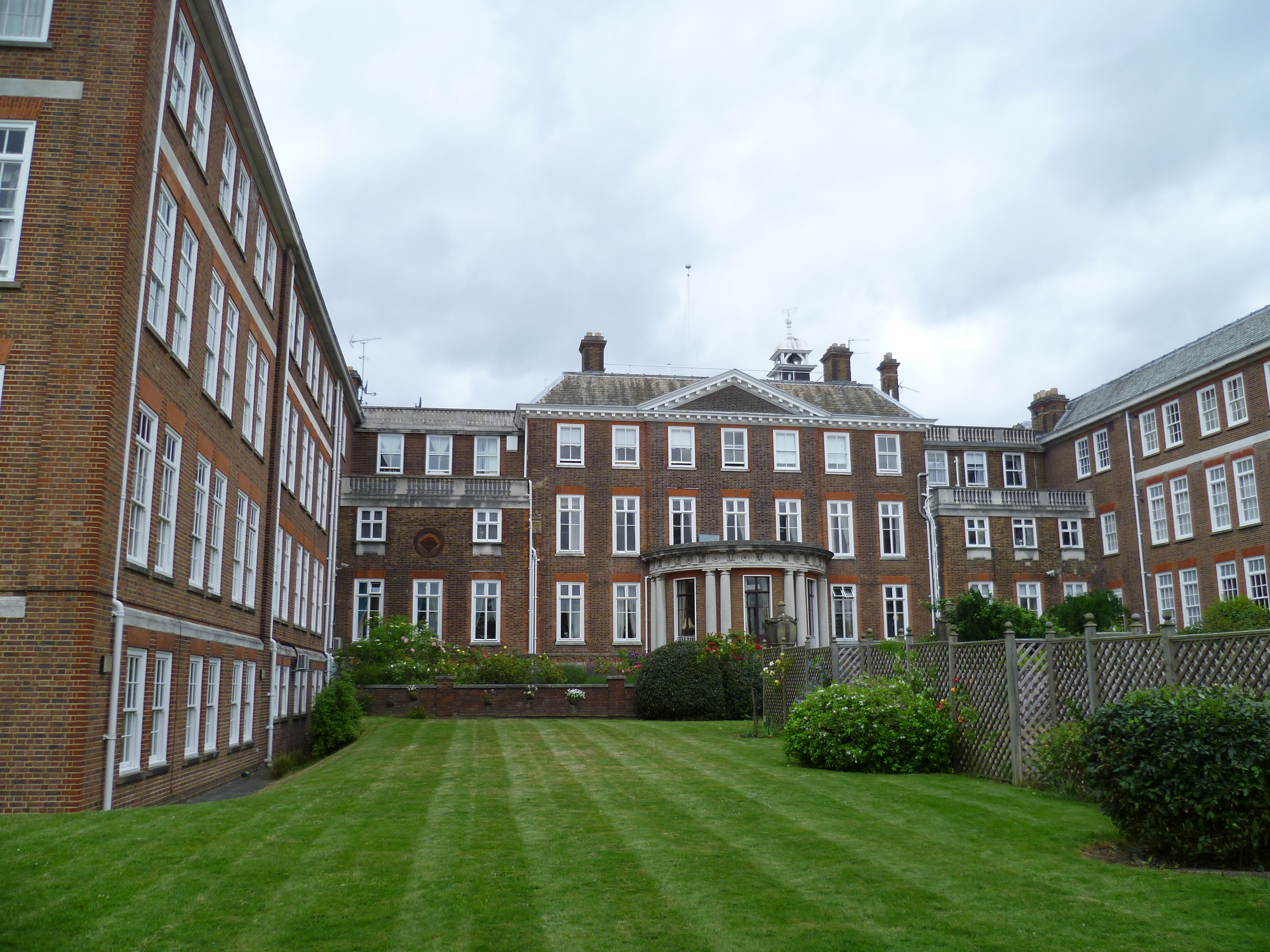
The extended house in 2016

Arnos Grove, originally known as Arnolds, is a grade II* listed house in Cannon Hill, Southgate, London.

== History ==
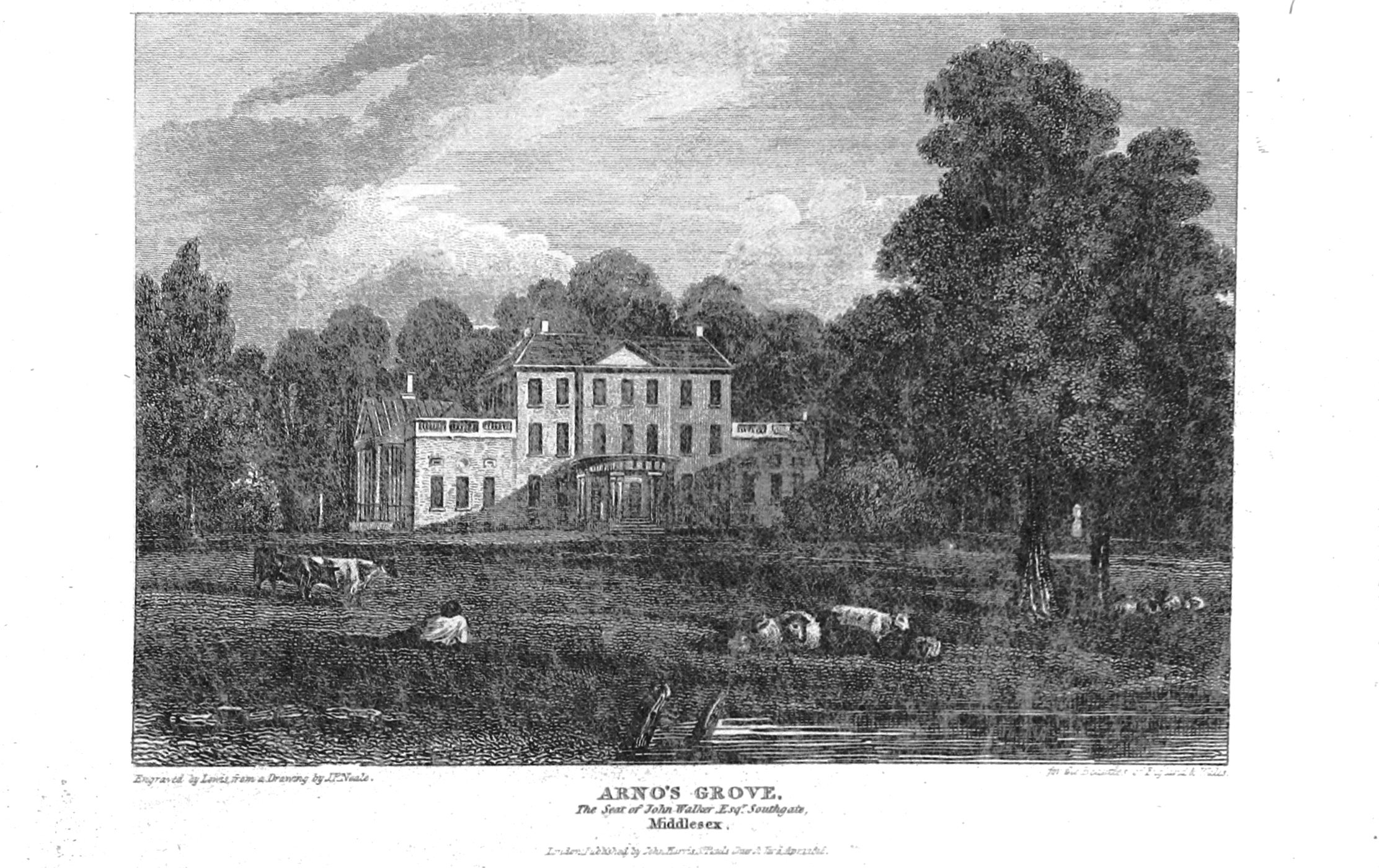
Arnos Grove house in 1816

The house was built after the London banker James Colebrooke bought the Arnolds estate in 1719 or 1720. The estate was previously owned by William Whitmore, inherited via Thomas Whitmore from the daughter of William Acton, who purchased from Sir John Weld. The house was later inherited by George Colebrooke and sold to Abraham Hume.

Locals called the estate Arno's, and next owner, Sir William Mayne (later Lord Newhaven), renamed the house and estate Arnos Grove, which is now pronounced as though it never had an apostrophe. In 1777, it was bought by Isaac Walker.

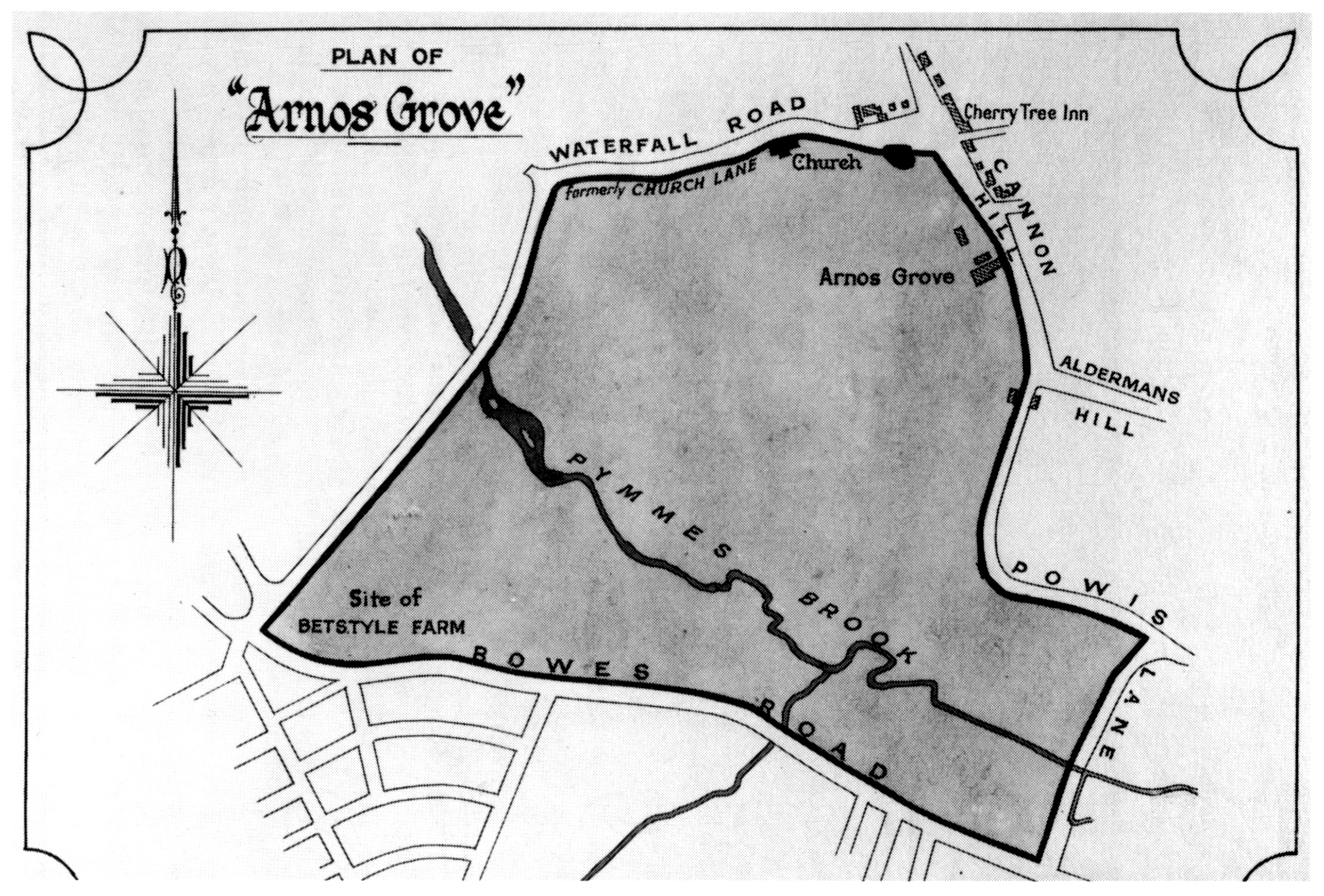
Plan of Arnos Grove from 1918 sale particulars incorporating the former Beaver Hall and Minchington Hall estates.

The mansion was described in 1821 by Edward Mogg in Paterson's Roads as:

containing many apartments, equally conspicuous for size, elegance, and that air of close domestic comfort so extremely desirable in the ever-varying climate of this country; these were highly adorned by the refined taste and liberality of the late proprietor [Mr Walker] and exhibit, besides a select and valuable collection of paintings, numerous Etruscan vases and other antiquities from Herculaneum and Pompeii, about 4000 specimens of choice minerals, scientifically arranged, and a beautiful cabinet of maple-wood, in which there is a vast number of scarce and estimable shells. The paintings of the staircase, executed by Lanscroon, a pupil of Verrio, in 1723, and representing the triumphal entry of Julius Caesar into Rome, and the apotheosis of that hero, are in good preservation, and may be considered, with the exception of those in the royal palaces, the best staircase decorations now remaining in Middlesex. Several of the principal apartments are fitted up in a costly but delicate style; there is a fine chimneypiece of Sicilian jasper in the dining room, which was executed in Italy, and comprises a beautiful mask of Apollo, in statuary marble; the chimneypiece of the drawing room is likewise of Sicilian jasper, and this apartment is adorned with pillars and pilasters, imitative of the same material.

The estate was owned from 1777 to 1918 by Walkers of the Taylor Walker brewing family (including the Walkers of Southgate), who bought the nearby Minchington Hall estate to increase the area of Arnos Grove to over 300 acres (1.2 km^{2}). The New River loop ran through the Arnos Grove estate until the nineteenth century. Upon the death of Taylor Walker in 1918, Arnos Grove was left to his son Richard Walker while he was still 18. The estate was then purchased by Lord Inverforth who sold the southernmost 44 acres (180,000 m^{2}) to the Southgate Urban District Council, which created Arnos Park in 1928, and the remainder to property developers.

The Arnos Grove mansion was also sold in 1928 to the North Metropolitan Electricity Supply Company, becoming known as Northmet House. The mansion was subsequently enlarged, with an extension to the south in 1929 followed by one at the north end of the house in 1935, resulting in loss of the portico facing Southgate Green, and encased in red brick. The house was sold to Legal & General in 1975 and renamed Southgate House (not to be confused with Southgate House). In 1997-8 the bulk of the property was converted into a residential care home called Southgate Beaumont with the southern part developed into luxury apartments.

== See also ==
- Arnos Grove
- Beaver Hall
- Minchington Hall
- Southgate House
- Cullands Grove
