= Alfred Walker (cricketer) =

English cricketer

Personal information
- Full name: Alfred Walker
- Born: 8 September 1827; Southgate, Middlesex, England
- Died: 4 September 1870 (aged 42); Arnos Grove, Middlesex, England
- Batting: Right-handed
- Bowling: Unknown-arm underarm
- Relatives: See: The Walkers of Southgate

Domestic team information
- Years: Team
- 1846–1848: Cambridge University
- 1851–1859: Middlesex

Career statistics
Competition	First-class
Matches	14
Runs scored	95
Batting average	4.75
100s/50s	–/–
Top score	20
Balls bowled	308
Wickets	36
Bowling average	13.83
5 wickets in innings	3
10 wickets in match	–
Best bowling	7/?
Catches/stumpings	9/–
- Source: Cricinfo, 4 July 2022

Alfred Walker (8 September 1827 – 4 September 1870) was an English cricketer.

Walker was born in Southgate, Middlesex and was the second of seven cricket playing brothers – the Walkers of Southgate. He was educated in Stanmore and at Trinity College, Cambridge. He played as a right-handed batsman and an underarm bowler in fourteen first-class matches for Cambridge University (1846–1848) and a Middlesex XI (1851–1859). He died in Arnos Grove, aged 42.
