= V. E. Walker =

English cricketer and administrator

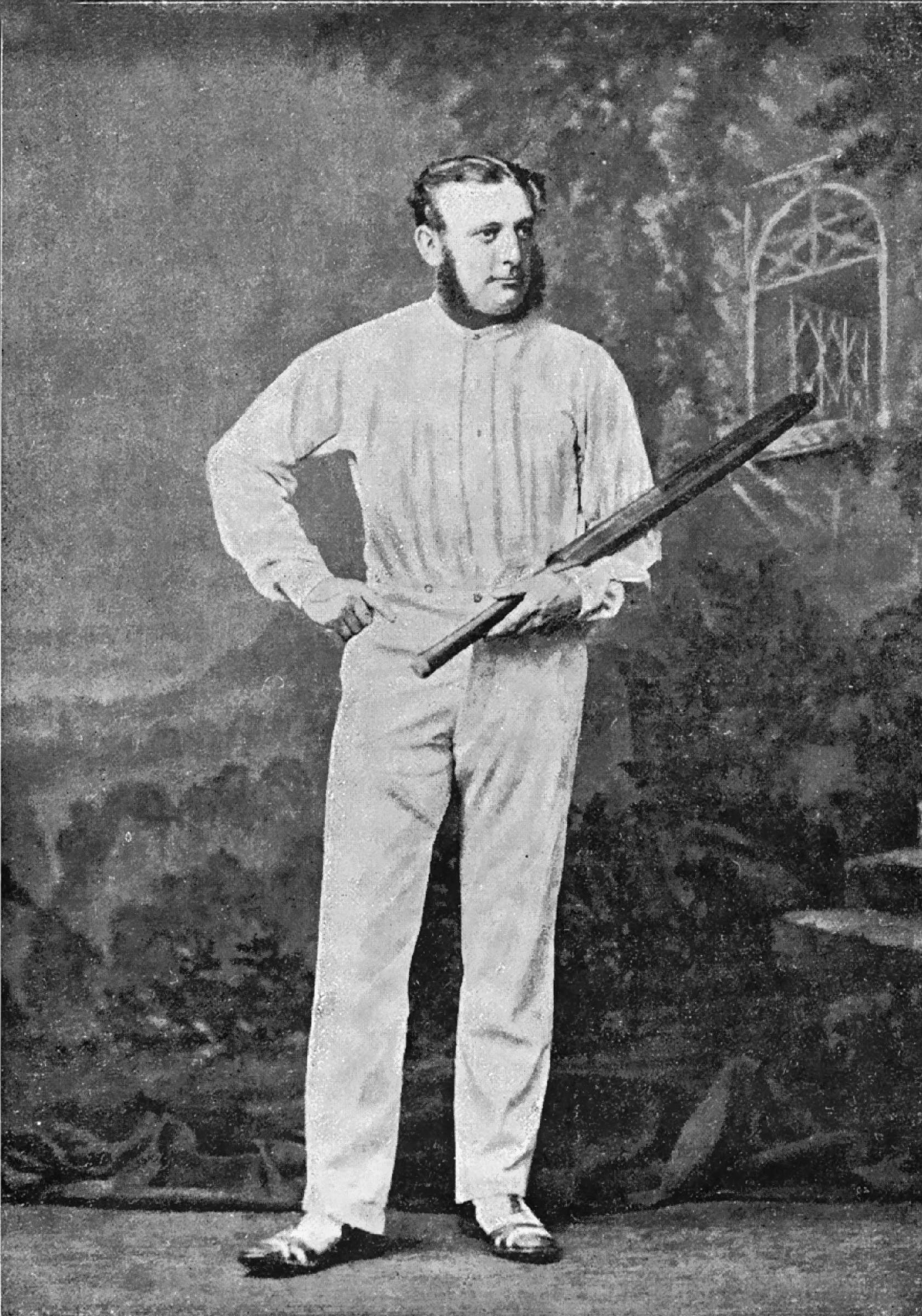
V.E. Walker

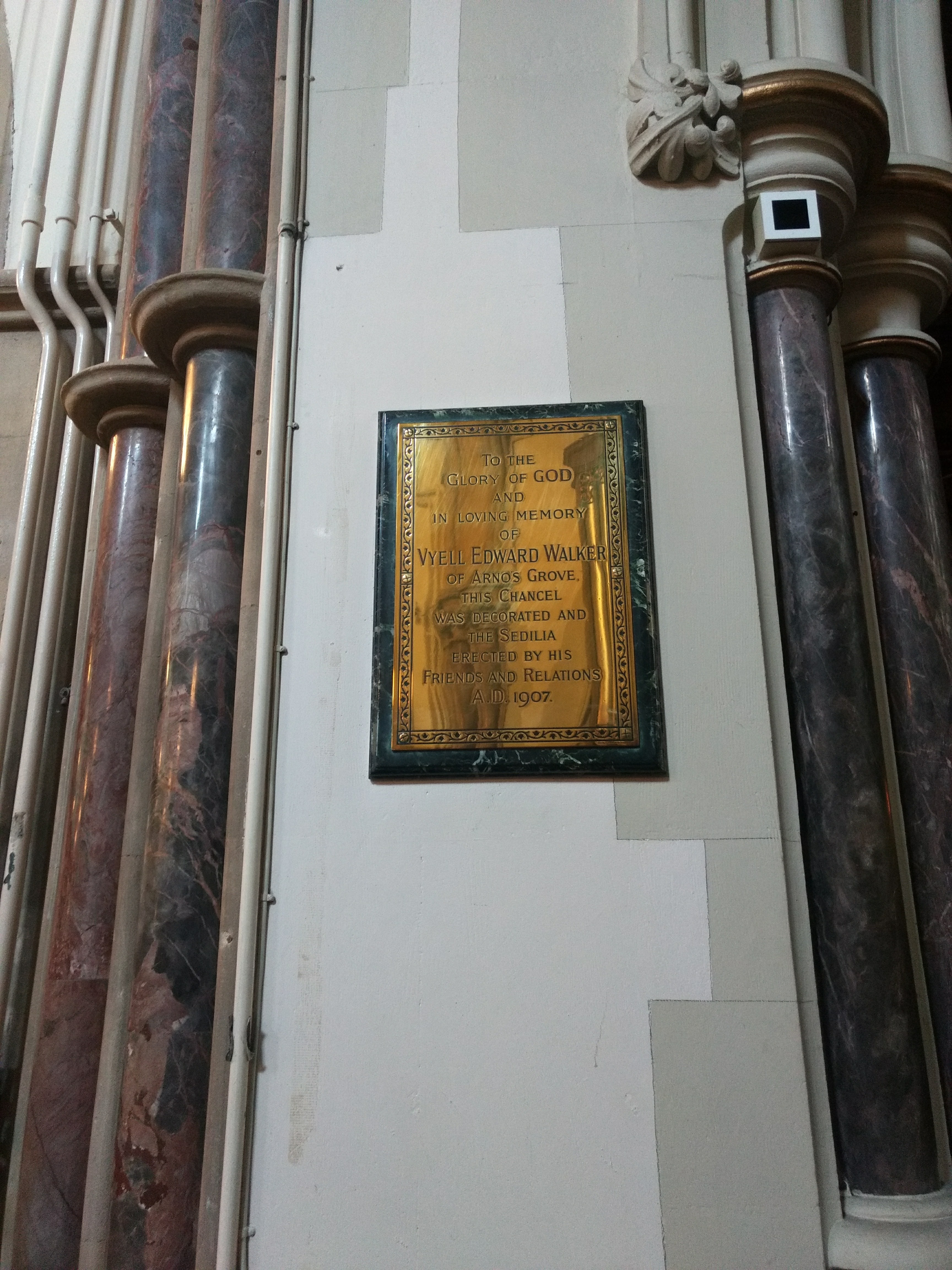
Vyell Edward Walker plaque, Christ Church, Southgate.

Vyell Edward Walker (20 April 1837 – 3 January 1906) was an English cricketer and administrator.

Teddy Walker was born in Southgate, Middlesex and educated at Harrow School. He was the fifth of seven cricket playing brothers who resided at Arnos Grove. They played a major part in establishing the Middlesex County Cricket Club, which was founded in 1864. Their cricket ground in Southgate is maintained by the Walker Trust to this day.

Walker was a right-handed batsman and an underarm slow right arm bowler who represented Marylebone Cricket Club (MCC) (1856–1870), a Middlesex XI (1859–1863) and Middlesex County Cricket Club (1864–1877).

In 1859 for an All England Eleven against Surrey County Cricket Club at The Oval he scored 20 not out, then took all 10 of the Surrey wickets (for 74 runs). In the second innings he scored 108 not out and took another 4 wickets. This was in a season where only 2 other centuries were scored in first-class matches. He also took 10 for 104 for Middlesex against Lancashire in 1865.

He captained the county club (1864–1872) and also served as President of the Marylebone Cricket Club (1891–1892) and of Middlesex County Cricket Club (1899–1906). He died at Arnos Grove, aged 68.

== See also ==
- Middlesex County Cricket Club
- The Walkers of Southgate

Sporting positions
Preceded by new title	Middlesex County Cricket Captain; 1864–1872	Succeeded by Isaac Walker
