= Curtis baronets =

There have been two baronetcies created for persons with the surname Curtis, one in the Baronetage of Great Britain and one in the Baronetage of the United Kingdom. One creation is extant as of 2023.

- Curtis baronets of Gatcombe (1794)
- Curtis baronets of Cullands Grove (1802)
