= 40 The Green, Southgate =

Building in Southgate, London, England

Coordinates: 51°37′32″N 0°07′28″W

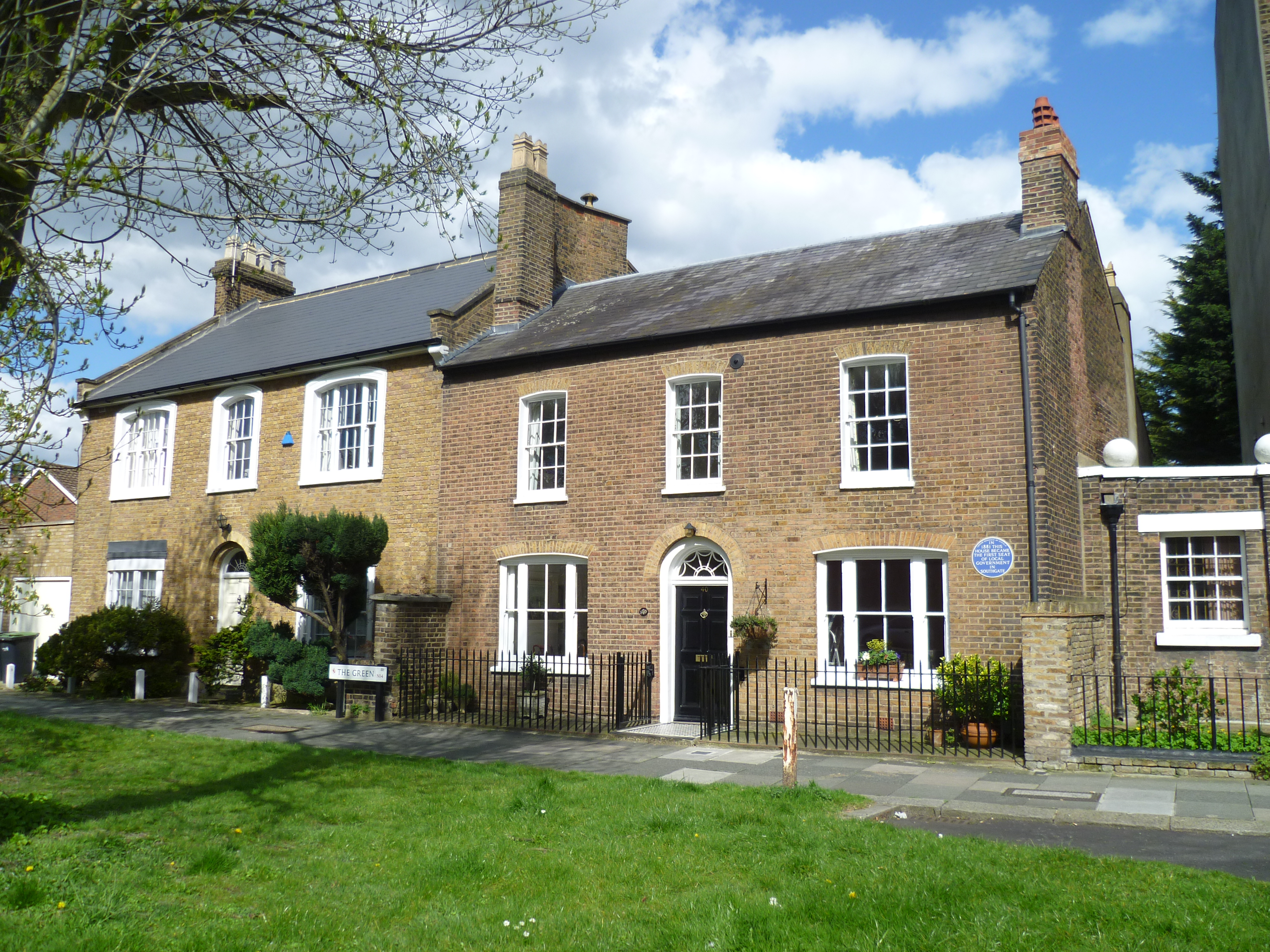
40 The Green (right).

40 The Green is a grade II listed building on The Green, Southgate, London. The house dates from the early nineteenth century with later alterations. It bears a local blue plaque that reads, "In 1881 this house became the first seat of local government in Southgate", referring to the separation of Southgate from Edmonton in that year.

== See also ==
- Sandford House & Norbury House
