= Edward Mogg =

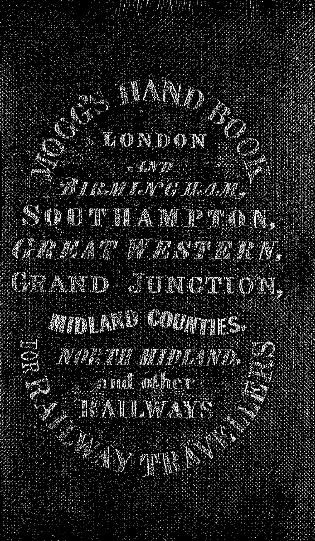
Mogg's Handbook for Railway Travellers, 1840

Edward Mogg was a publisher in London in the 19th century. He issued maps and travel guides to London and other localities in England and Wales. Mogg's publications appear in works of fiction such as Robert Smith Surtees' Mr. Sponge's Sporting Tour and Shirley Brooks' The Naggletons.

== Publications ==
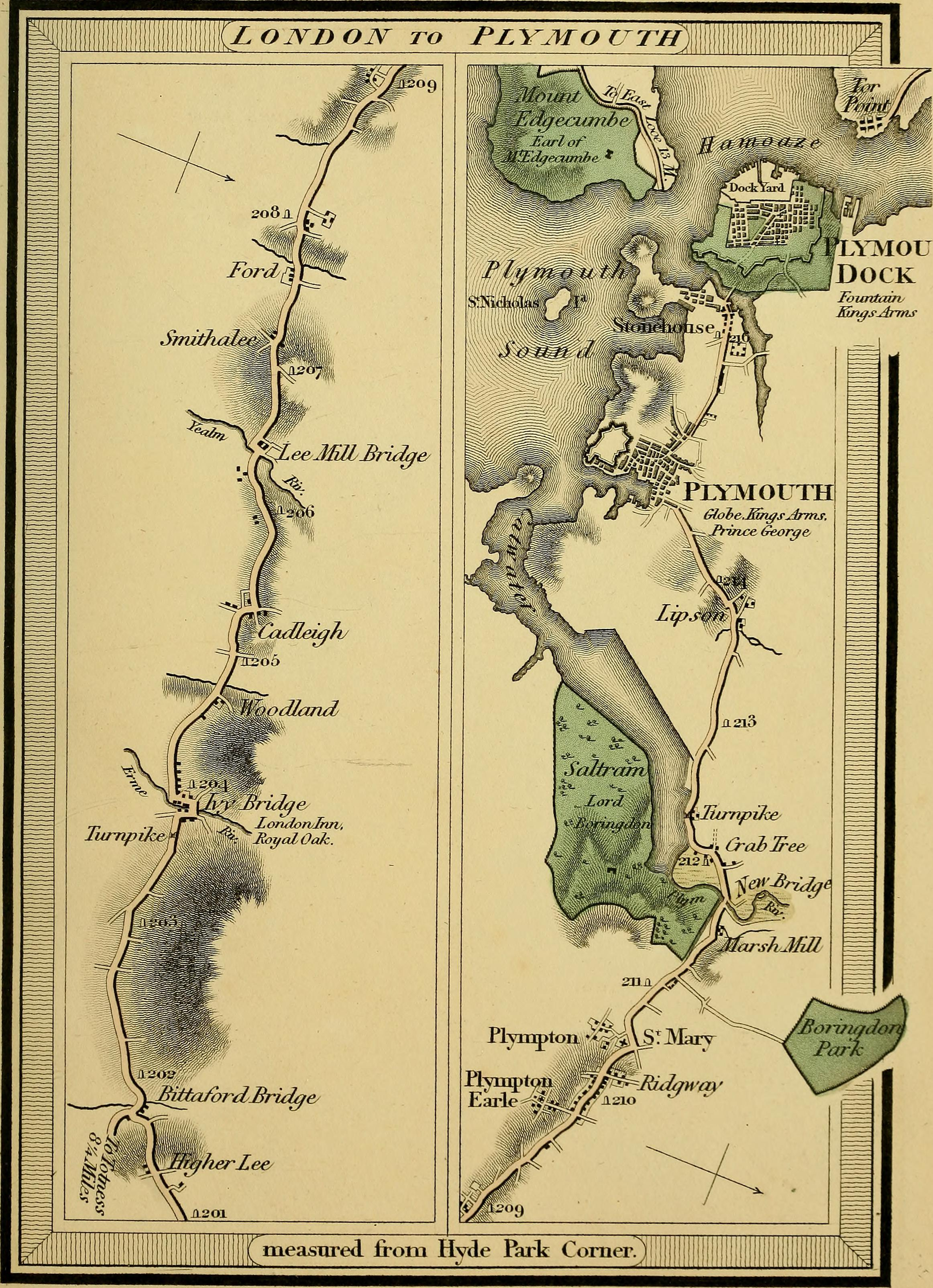
Survey of the high roads of England and Wales

=== 1800s-1810s ===
- Edward Mogg (1800), Street Directory; Being a List of all the Streets, &c. in London
- London in Miniature (2nd ed.), London: E. Mogg, 1807, OCLC 801549915 (map)
- Edward Mogg (1808), Survey of the Roads from London to Brighton, Southampton, Portsmouth, Hastings, Tunbridge-Wells, Margate, Ramsgate, and Dover
- Strangers Guide to London and Westminster, London: E. Mogg, 1817, OCLC 244788408 (map)
- Survey of the High Roads of England and Wales: Part the First Comprising the Counties of Kent, Surrey, Sussex, Hants, Wilts, Dorset, Somerset, Devon, and Cornwall, London: Edward Mogg, No.51, Charing Cross, 1817

=== 1820s-1830s ===
- Daniel Paterson; Edward Mogg (1822), Paterson's Roads (16th ed.)
  - Edward Mogg (1824), Paterson's Roads (17th ed.), London: Longman, Hurst, Rees, Orme, Brown, and Green
  - Edward Mogg (1826), Paterson's Roads (18th ed.), London: Longman, Hurst, Rees, Orme, Brown, and Green
- Edward Mogg (1828), Mogg's Table of the New Watermen's Fares, London
- Edward Mogg (1838), Mogg's New Picture of London, London
  - Edward Mogg (1848), Mogg's New Picture of London (11th ed.), London: E. Mogg, no.14 Great Russell Street, Covent Garden

=== 1840s-1850s ===
- Mogg's Handbook for Railway Travellers; Or, Real Iron-road Book (2nd ed.), London: Edward Mogg, 1840 + Index
- Edward Mogg (1841), Mogg's Brighton Railway, and Brighton, Lewes, Shoreham, and Worthing Guide, London
- Mogg's Great Western Railway and Windsor, Bath, and Bristol Guide, London: E. Mogg, 1841
- Edward Mogg (1842), Mogg's Birmingham Railway, and Birmingham, Coventry, Warwick, and Leamington Guide, London
- Edward Mogg (1842), Mogg's Grand Junction Railway and Birmingham, Liverpool, and Manchester Railway Guide, London
- Edward Mogg (1843), Mogg's South-Eastern, or London and Dover Railway, and Tunbridge Wells, Hythe, Folkestone, and Dover Guide, London
- Edward Mogg (1844), Mogg's Omnibus Guide, and Metropolitan Carriage Time Table, London: E. Mogg
- Mogg's Southampton Railway, and Isle of Wight Guide, London: E. Mogg, 1845
- Mogg's Ten Thousand Cab Fares, London: E. Mogg, 1849
  - W. Mogg (1859), Mogg's Ten Thousand Cab Fares, London
- Mogg's New London Guide, London: E. Mogg, 1849 (map)
- Mogg's London and Environs, London: E.S. Mogg, 1851 (map)
- Index to the Streets, Squares, and Cab Stands, Comprised in Mogg's New Cab Fare, Distance Map, and Guide to London, Bloomsbury: W. Mogg, 1859, OCLC 533395480, OL 25119243M
