= Stephen Godin =

English insurance broker

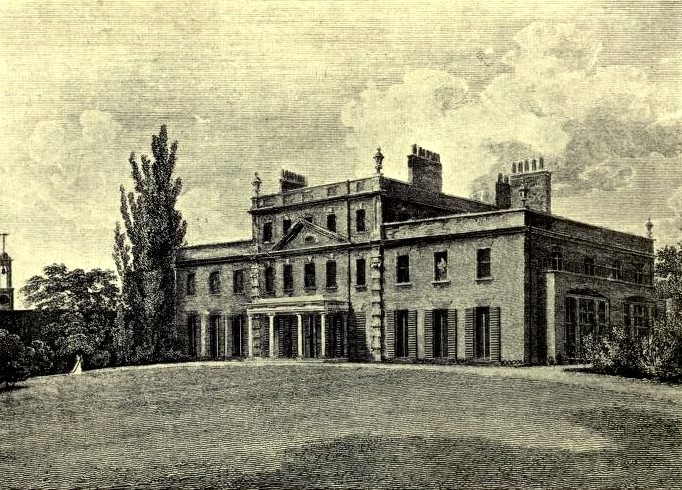
- Cullands Grove, Southgate, seen in 1801
- Born: Stephen Peter Godin c. 1707
- Died: 15 March 1787 (aged 79–80); Southgate, Middlesex
- Occupation: Insurance broker
- Known for: Improved Cullands Grove; Charitable work

Stephen Peter Godin (24 March 1707 – 15 March 1787) was an English insurance broker in the City of London and a land-owner in Middlesex. He acquired Cullands Grove in Southgate in what is now north London and may have built the first house on the land. He played an active part in public life and was an officer of a number of charitable organisations.

== Early life and family ==
Stephen Godin was born around 1707 to Stephen Peter Godin (died 1729), a Huguenot merchant in London, and his wife Sussana Godin (née Atterbury).

According to family records published in The Genealogist in 1912, he married Rebecca Noortwyck in Wanstead on 15 June 1731. They were married for 42 years, until his wife's death on 8 March 1774. They had 12 children, 5 sons and 7 daughters; all of the sons and several of the daughters died young.

Four daughters survived and married, three to merchants of the Russia Company. His eldest daughter, Elizabeth Godin, married John Shiffner. Stephen's fourth daughter, Jane Godin, married Godfrey Thornton, later Governor of the Bank of England; one of their sons was William Astell.

Stephen's second daughter Susanna Godin (1735–1801) married John Cornwall, and three of their daughters married notable husbands: Susan Cornwall married Samuel Heywood in 1781, and Rebecca and Eleanor Cornwall married John Simeon, later 1st Baronet, and Peter Thellusson, later 1st Baron Rendlesham, at a double wedding in 1783. A fourth daughter, Augusta Cornwall, married James Stanley, and their daughter Augusta married Richard Dawson, 1st Earl of Dartrey.

Stephen Godin's youngest daughter, Sophia, married Lt. Col. (later General) Robert Morse (1743-1818) of the Corps of Engineers, and later first Inspector-General of Fortifications; their surviving daughter Harriett Morse married the military engineer James Carmichael-Smyth (later Major General and 1st Baronet).

== Career ==
Godin practised with great success as a marine insurance broker in the City of London. He was known for his philanthropy and the role he played in public life. In 1760 he was a steward of the London Hospital, Mile End Road, a member of the committee of the Society for the British Troops, and a steward of Magdalen House for Reception of Penitent Prostitutes in Prescot Street, Goodman's Fields (opened 1758). He was a member of the Incorporated Society for Promoting English Protestant Schools in Ireland and a director of the French Hospital (La Providence) in London in 1769.

In the mid-18th century, possibly in 1754, Godin bought the woodland known as Gullands Grove, later Cullands Grove, Southgate, in the county of Middlesex, from Walter Henshaw and Henry Hadley. He greatly improved it and owned it until his death by which time Cullands Grove house was in existence. The house and estate were sold after his death to Sir William Curtis, 1st Baronet, who made improvements to the house.

== Death ==
Godin died on 15 March 1787 at Southgate and was buried at St Peter le Poer church in Broad Street in the City of London. His will is held by the British National Archives at Kew.
