= The Walkers of Southgate =

English cricketing family

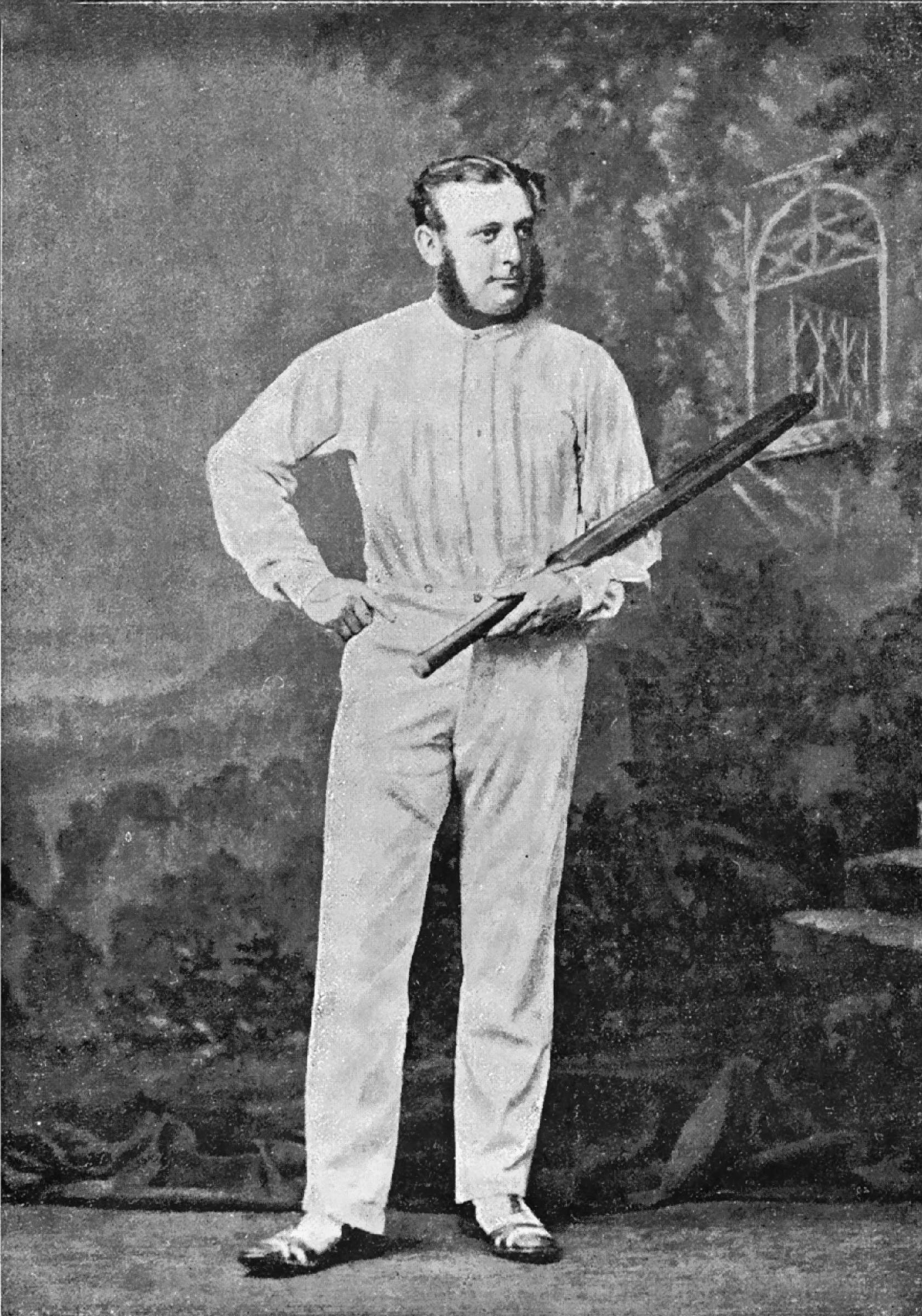
V.E. Walker

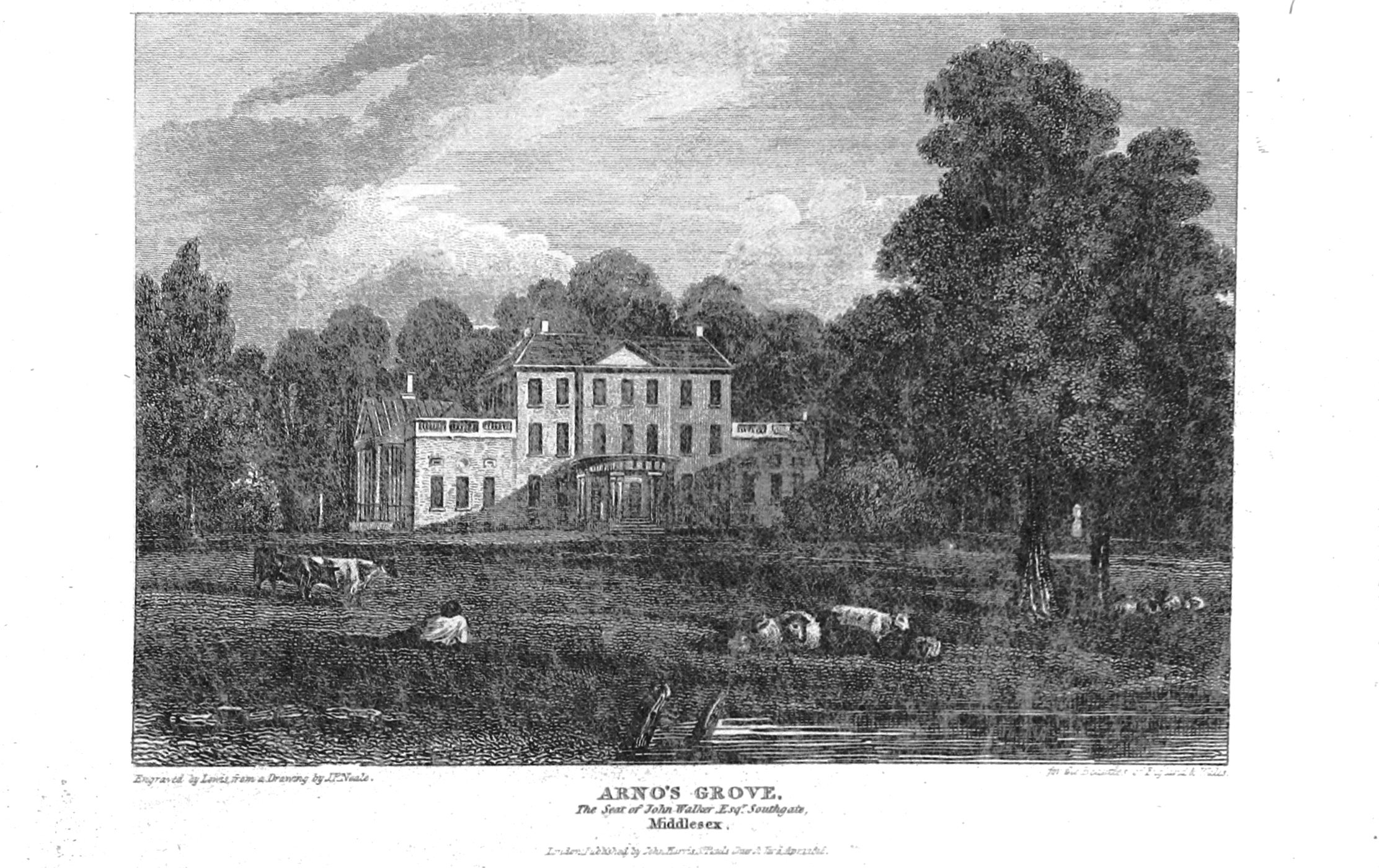
Arno's Grove house in 1816, home of the Walker brothers.

The Walkers of Southgate were an English cricketing family who lived at Arnos Grove house in Southgate, Middlesex, England. The family fortune was partly built through the brewing company Taylor Walker, and the Walker brothers – seven of the twelve children of brewer Isaac Walker (1794–1853) and Sarah Sophia Taylor (1801–1864) – were all sent to Harrow School and Trinity College, Cambridge, where they became keen cricketers. The brothers were the nephews of cricketer Henry Walker and the great-grandchildren of merchant Isaac Walker.

== Cricket ==
The three eldest brothers originally played for the Southgate Albert, the village team, on the bumpy Chapel Fields wicket until John had the ground re-turfed in the early 1850s. The brothers founded the Southgate Cricket Club in 1855, a Middlesex team in 1859, the official Middlesex County Cricket Club in 1864, and were instrumental in establishing the home of the county at Lords in 1877. In 1859, the first match played by the Middlesex team was held in Southgate against Kent, who were defeated by 78 runs.

Although Test cricket only started in 1877, four of the brothers played in the United All-England Eleven prior to that date. Both the United All-England team and the Marylebone Cricket Club (MCC) would visit Southgate to take on the brothers and their team, attended by crowds of up to 10,000.

Their cricket ground Chapel Fields in Waterfall Road, Southgate became the Walker Cricket Ground in 1907 and is maintained by the Walker Trust to this day.

== The brothers ==
- The seven Walker brothers were:
  - John Walker (1826–1885)
  - Alfred Walker (1827–1870)
  - Frederic Walker (1829–1889)
  - Arthur Henry Walker (1833–1878)
  - Vyell Edward Walker (1837–1906)
  - Russell Donnithorne Walker (1842–1922)
  - Isaac Donnithorne Walker (1844–1898)
- The brothers had an uncle who also was a cricketer:
  - Henry Walker (1807–1872)

The entomologist Francis Walker was another uncle.

The brothers are all buried in the family vault in the churchyard of Christ Church, Southgate.
