= Southgate, London =

Area of north London, England

Coordinates: 51.6316°N 0.1265°W

Southgate
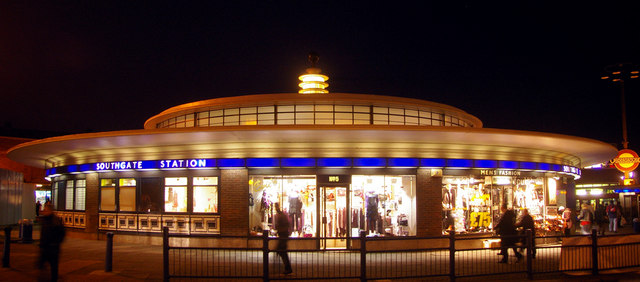
- Southgate underground station

- Location within Greater London
- Population: 14,454 (2011)
- OS grid reference: TQ296942
- London borough: Enfield
- Ceremonial county: Greater London
- Region: London
- Country: England
- Sovereign state: United Kingdom
- Post town: LONDON
- Postcode district: N14
- Dialling code: 020
- Police: Metropolitan
- Fire: London
- Ambulance: London
- UK Parliament: Southgate and Wood Green
- London Assembly: Enfield and Haringey

Southgate is a suburban area of north London, England, in the London Borough of Enfield, 8 miles (13 km) north of Charing Cross.

== History ==
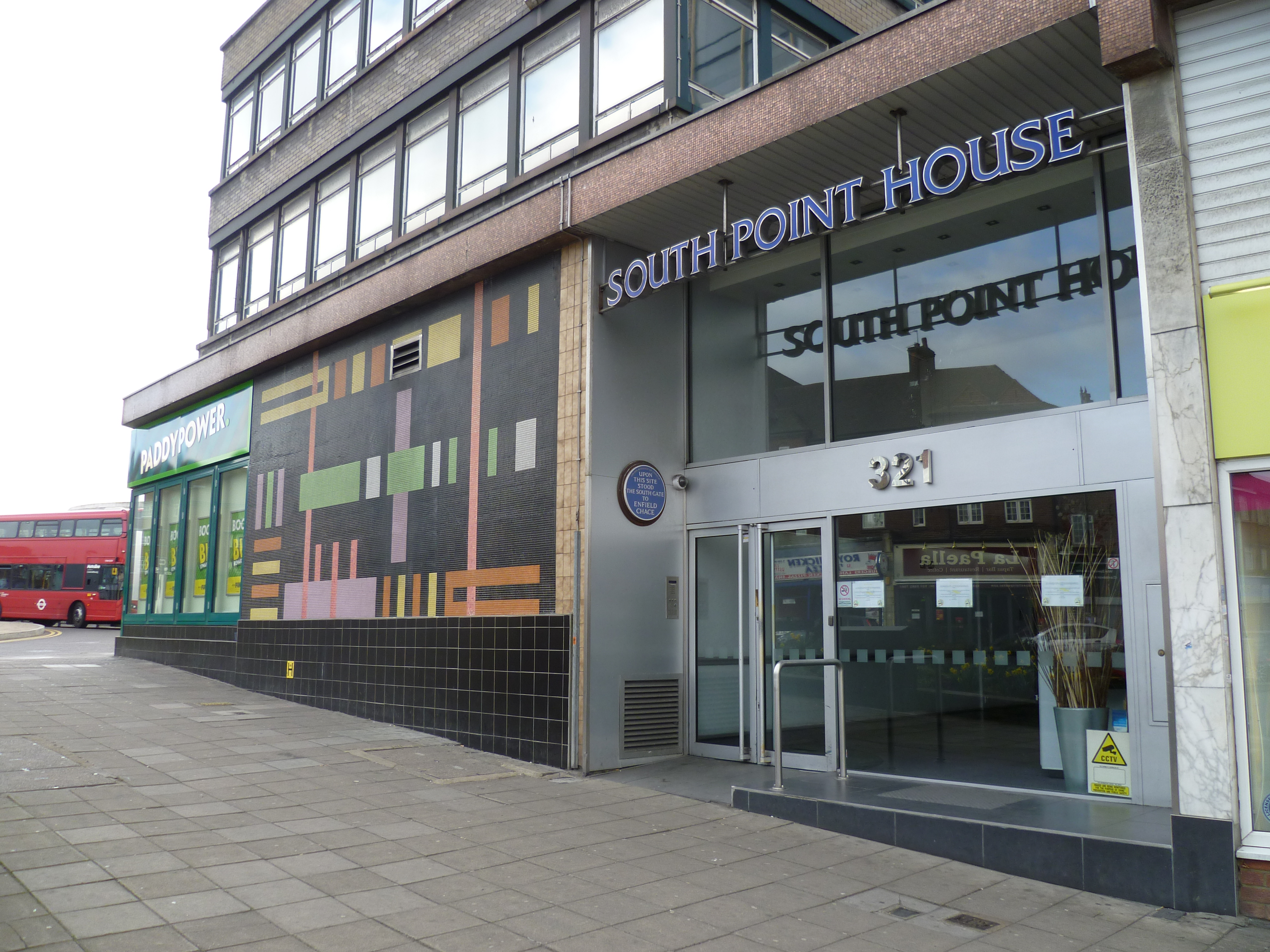
South Point House, where the South Gate once stood.

Southgate was originally the south gate of Enfield Chase, the King's hunting grounds. This is reflected in the street names Chase Road (which leads due north from the station to Oakwood, and was formerly the avenue into the Chase) and Chase Side. There is a blue plaque on a building on the site of the south gate. A little further to the south was another small medieval settlement called South Street which had grown up around a village green; by 1829 the two settlements had merged and the village green became today's Southgate Green.

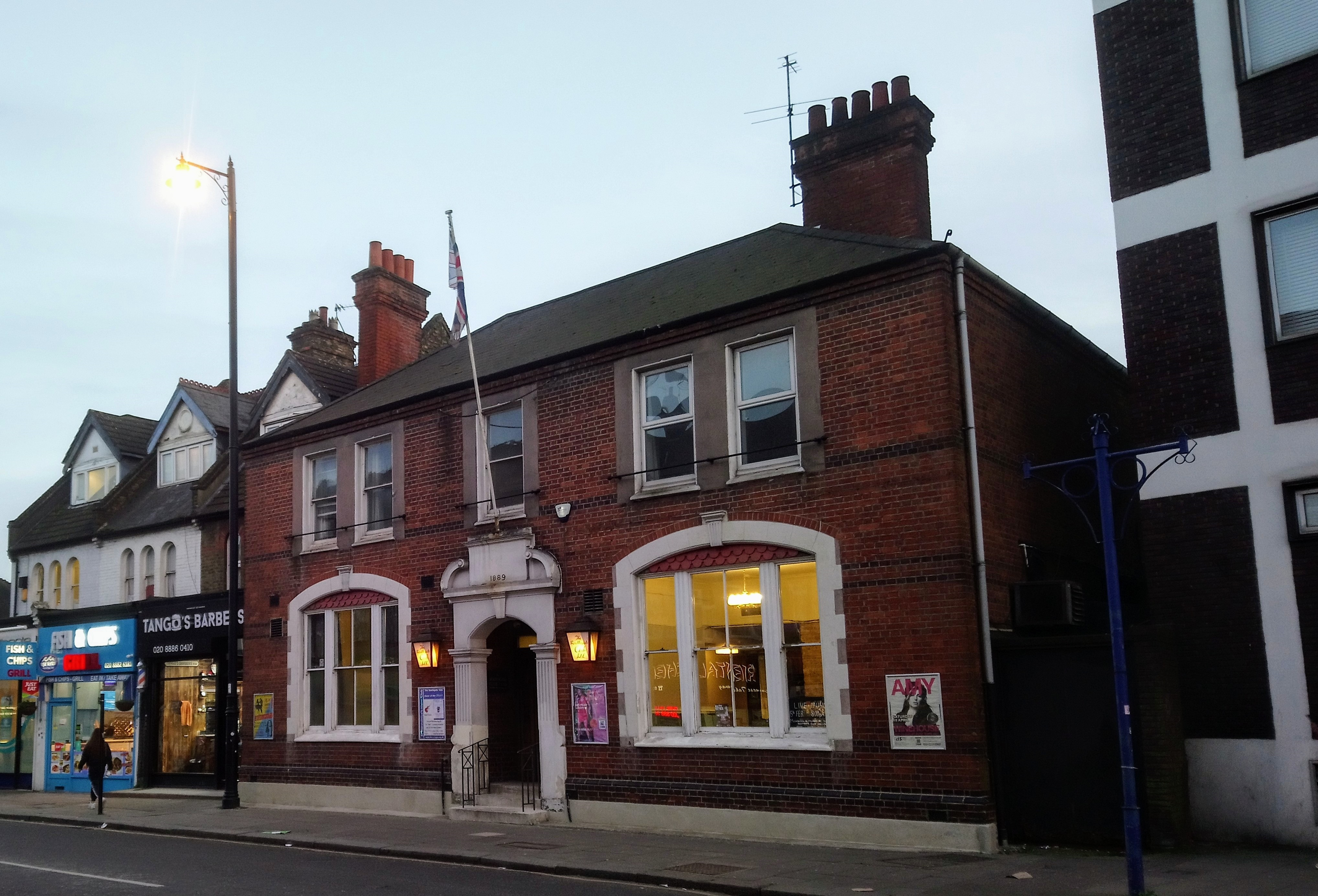
Rare survivors of 1930s development: The Southgate Club (built 1889) and adjacent Victorian terrace in Chase Side.

Southgate was predominantly developed in the 1930s: largish semi-detached houses were built on the hilly former estates (Walker, Osidge, Monkfrith, etc.) following increased transport development. In 1933, the North Circular Road was completed through Edmonton and Southgate, and also in 1933, the London Underground Piccadilly line was extended from Arnos Grove (where it had reached the previous year), through Southgate tube station, on to Enfield West (now known as Oakwood). This unleashed a building boom, and by 1939 the area had become almost fully developed.

=== Governance ===
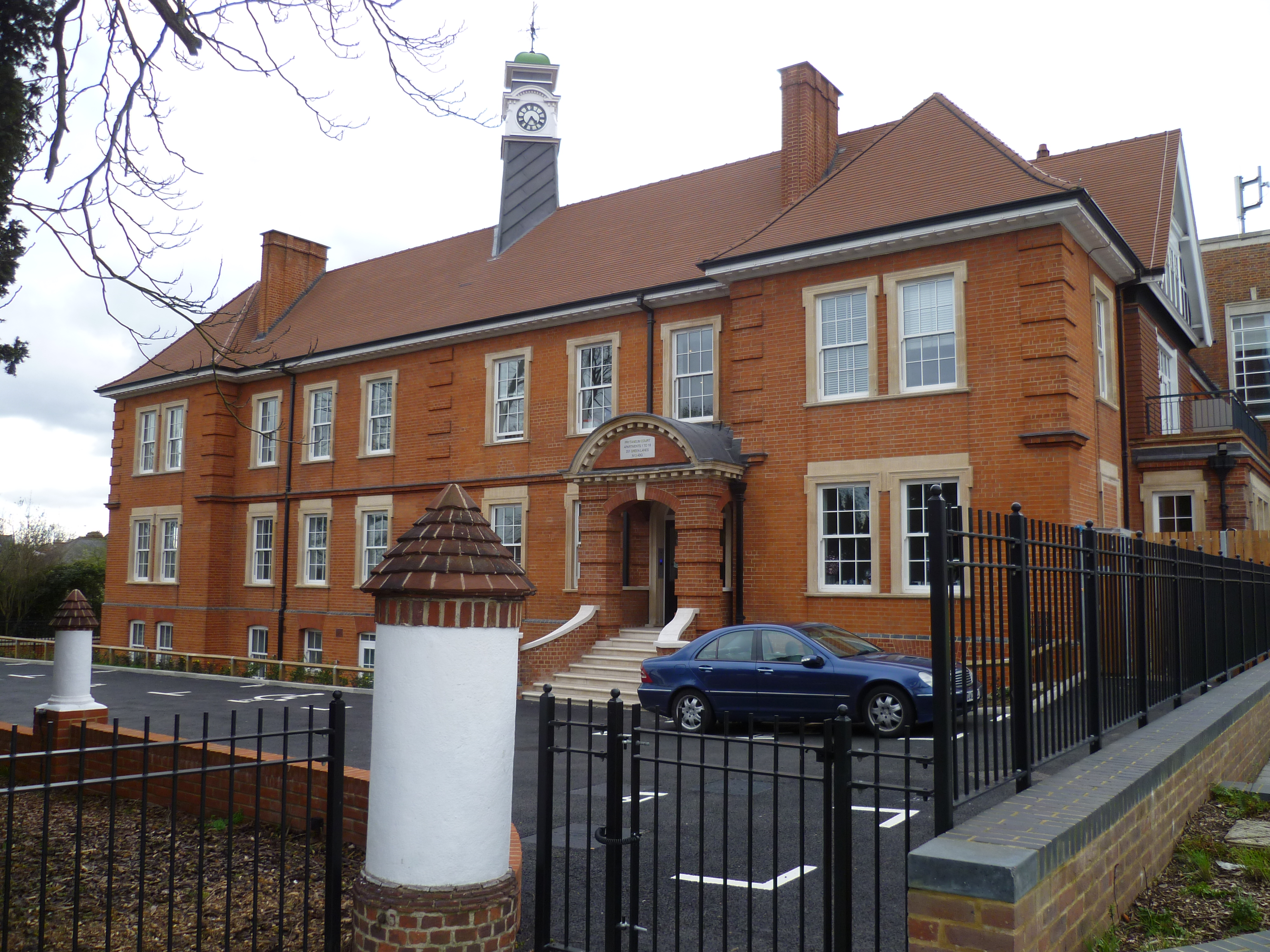
The former Southgate Town Hall, now a housing development

In 1894 an urban district of Middlesex, called Southgate, was created by the Local Government Act 1894. In 1933 the Municipal Borough of Southgate was created. The borough, which had its headquarters at Southgate Town Hall, was abolished in 1965 by the London Government Act 1963. Its area then came within the newly created London Borough of Enfield, which also included the areas that had been within the Municipal Borough of Enfield and the Municipal Borough of Edmonton.

The parliamentary constituency covering the part of Southgate in the London Borough of Enfield is Southgate and Wood Green. Until his death in the Brighton bombing in 1984, the constituency was represented by Sir Anthony Berry. In 1997, Michael Portillo, who succeeded Berry, lost the seat to Stephen Twigg, who after two terms lost in his turn to David Burrowes in May 2005. In the 2017 general election, Bambos Charalambous defeated Burrowes and became the new representative of the constituency.

== Local features ==
Within the area is the art deco Grade II* Southgate tube station designed by Charles Holden. The area has several large green parks such as Grovelands Park which covers ninety-two acres and contains the seven-acre former boating lake and adjoining woodland of the adjacent Grade I listed Grovelands House (formerly 'Southgate Grove'). In Waterfall Road is Christ Church, built in 1862 by Sir Gilbert Scott; adjacent to its grounds, in Minchenden Oak Garden, stands the Minchenden Oak. Across the road from the church lies the Walker Cricket Ground; a regular Middlesex venue which was first used in 1859 and is named after the cricketer John Walker.

The Southgate Green conservation area contains several notable Grade II listed buildings such as Arnoside House and Essex House, Sandford House & Norbury House, Old House & Essex Coach House, 40 The Green and the Valentine Poole houses. The adjoining Cannon Hill features the early-18th century Arnos Grove House and the High Street features Southgate House.

Southgate station on the Piccadilly line is the nearest tube stop to most of Southgate's residential area. Other stations are at Oakwood (to the north) and Arnos Grove (to the south west).

== Demography ==
Southgate is a cosmopolitan district. There has been a prominent Jewish community since the early 20th century. There are also many Greek, Greek Cypriot, Japanese, and Turkish families living in the district. As of the 2011 census, the White British demographic makes up 45% of the population, followed by Other White at 20%.

== Notable people ==
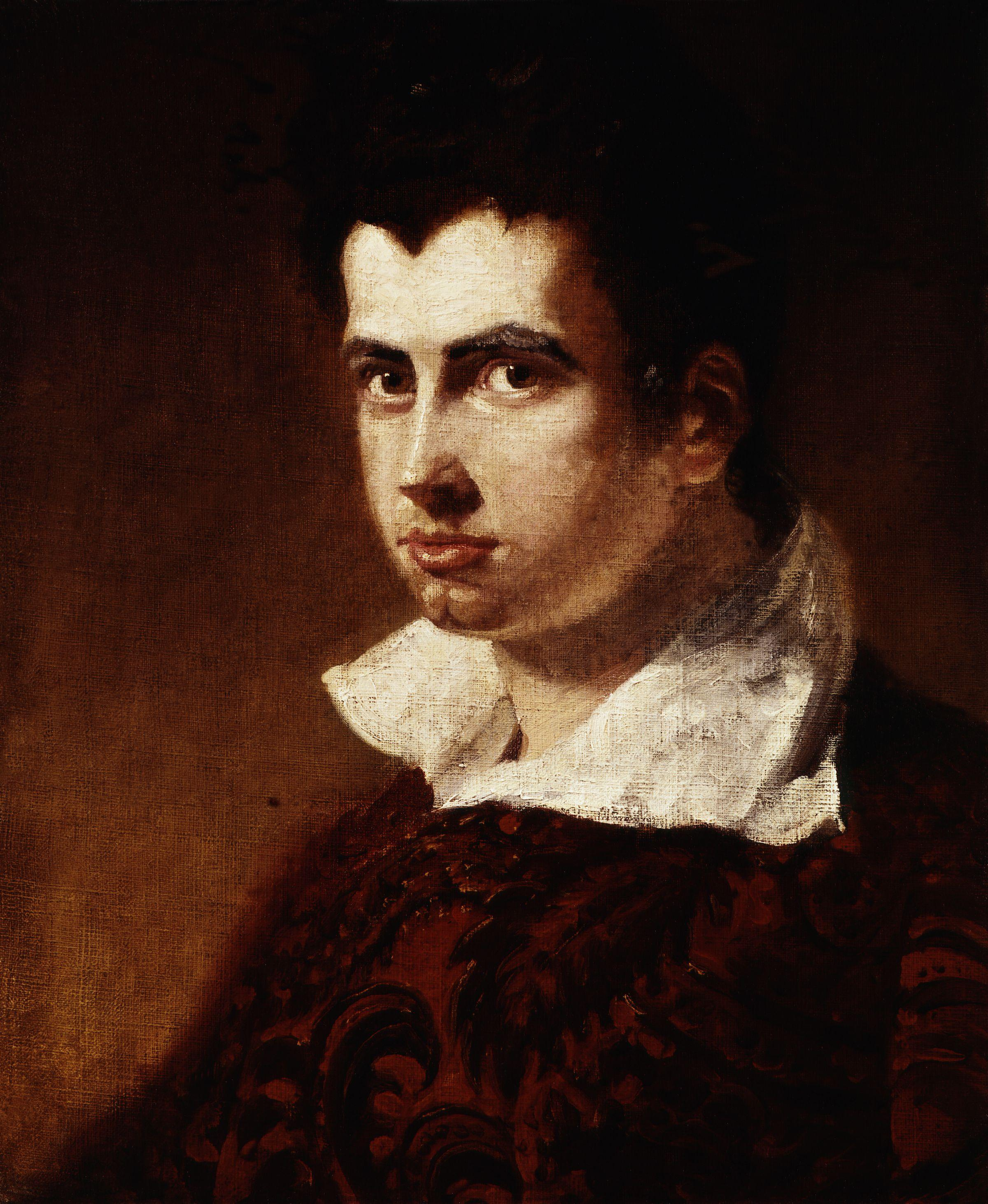
Leigh Hunt

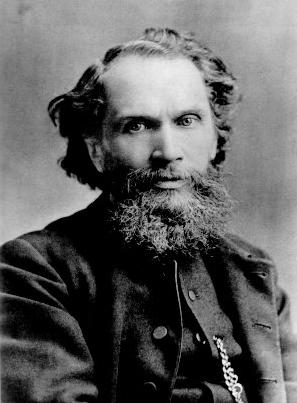
Benjamin Waugh

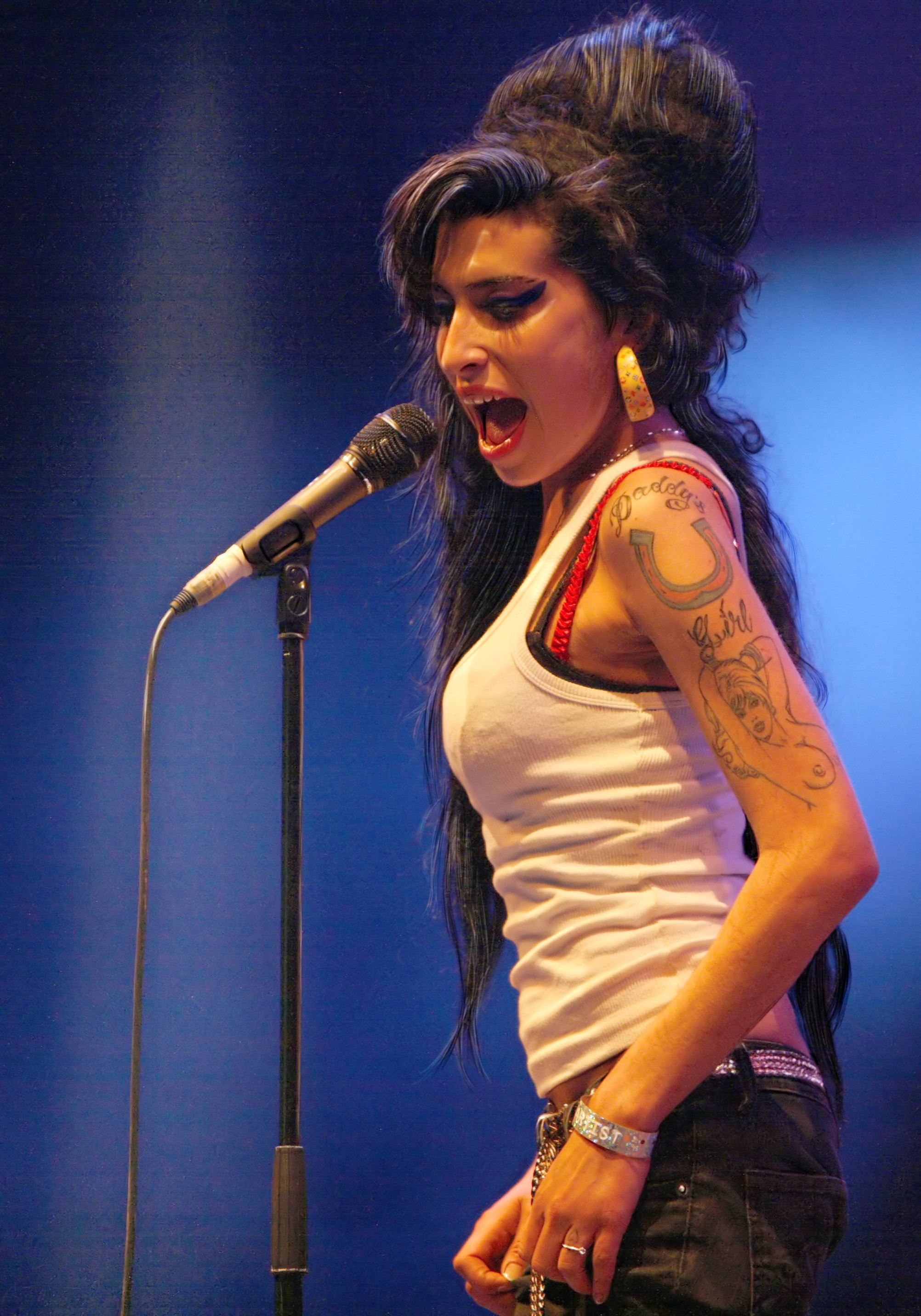
Amy Winehouse

- William Acton, owned Arnolds estate.
- Neville Brody, graphic designer, born in Southgate in 1957.
- Errol Brown, singer.
- James Brydges, 3rd Duke of Chandos, lived at Minchington Hall.
- Raymond Wilson Chambers, writer, lived in Selborne Road, Southgate Green.
- Dave Clark, lived in Chase Side.
- James Colebrooke and George Colebrooke, first owners of Arnos Grove house.
- William Curtis; MP, Sheriff and Lord Mayor, lived at Cullands Grove.
- Dave Davies, musician.
- Alan Dumayne, local historian.
- Lynne Franks, communications strategist and writer.
- Stephen Godin, 18th century broker, lived at Cullands Grove.
- Augustus Hare, writer.
- David Hepworth, journalist and writer.
- David Hechstetter, merchant, lived at Minchington Hall.
- Frederick Hitch, awarded the Victoria Cross.
- Abraham Hume, owned Arnos Grove house.
- Leigh Hunt, essayist and writer, born in Southgate in 1784.
- Ashley Hutchings, musician, born 1945.
- Peter Jay, drummer, born 1944.
- Jay1, rapper, born in Southgate
- Selin Kiazim, chef and restaurateur.
- John Lawrence, 1st Baron Lawrence, lived in Southgate House in the 1860s.
- Patrick Linstead, English chemist, born in Southgate in 1902.
- Thomas Lipton, came to Southgate in 1892, and lived in Osidge House (in East Barnet, but within the parish of Southgate) until his death in 1931.
- Robert Lowe, 19th century politician.
- Linda Lusardi, grew up in Palmers Green (at that time in Southgate).
- Allastair McReady-Diarmid, awarded the Victoria Cross.
- William Mayne, 1st Baron Newhaven, owned Arnos Grove house.
- Simon Mayo was born in Southgate, 1958.
- Ron Moody, actor, lived in Southgate in his later years.
- John Moore, Lord Mayor, circa 1674.
- David Puttnam, film producer, born in Southgate in 1941.
- Ted Ray and Andrew Ray.
- Rob Rinder, barrister and TV judge.
- Henry Crabb Robinson, diarist, circa 1812.
- Dame Flora Robson, star of stage and cinema, lived at 65 The Mall between 1910 and 1921.
- Sarbel, pop singer, born 1981.
- John Henry Powell Schneider and Henry Schneider, lived at Beaver Hall.
- Paul Scott, lived at various addresses in Southgate and Palmers Green.
- Alan Sinfield, writer and theorist, born 1941.
- Rachel Stevens, S Club 7 star, was born and raised in Southgate; she attended Osidge Primary and Ashmole School.
- Samuel Sugden, 19th century merchant, lived at Oak Lodge.
- Richard Temple-Nugent-Brydges-Chandos-Grenville and Anne Temple-Nugent-Brydges-Chandos-Grenville, lived at Minchington Hall.
- Joseph Thornton, railway contractor, lived at Beaver Hall.
- Isaac Walker, and The Walkers of Southgate.
- Benjamin Waugh, founder of the NSPCC, lived at Southgate Green in the 1880s.
- Andrew Weir, owned Arnos Grove house.
- John Weld, 17th century merchant, owned Arnolds estate.
- Thomas Whitmore and William Whitmore, owned Arnolds estate.
- Amy Winehouse, singer-songwriter, born in the Southgate area, was raised at her home on Osidge Lane. She attended Osidge Primary and Ashmole School.
- Thomas Wolstenholme, John Wolstenholme and Nicholas Wolstenholme of Minchington Hall.

== Education ==
=== College ===
- Southgate College
- Oak Hill College (in the London Borough of Barnet)

=== Schools ===
==== Primary ====
- De Bohun Primary School
- St Andrew's CE Primary
- St Monica's RC Primary
- Salcombe Preparatory School (Independent)
- Vita et Pax School (Independent)
- Walker Primary
- West Grove Primary
- Wolfson Hillel Primary
- Osidge Primary School (in the London Borough of Barnet)

==== Secondary ====
- Southgate School
- Ashmole Academy (in the London Borough of Barnet)

== Religious facilities ==
=== Synagogues ===
There are four synagogues with Southgate in their name: Cockfosters and North Southgate, Palmers Green and Southgate Synagogue (both part of the United Synagogue), Southgate Progressive Synagogue in Oakwood, and Chabad Southgate. The former Southgate and District Reform Synagogue has now moved to Whetstone, and changed its name in February 2010 to Sha'arei Tsedek: North London Reform Synagogue.

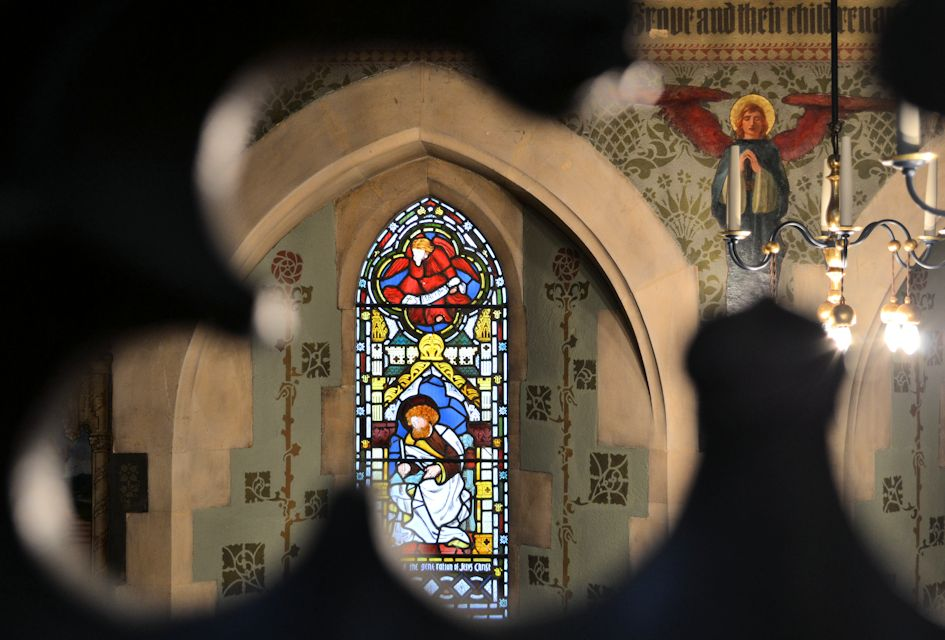
Morris & Co. stained glass at Christ Church, Waterfall Road

=== Churches ===
Christ Church stands near Southgate Green. This was built on the site of Weld Chapel, which was built in 1615 and demolished in 1863. The clock on the church was placed there to celebrate Queen Victoria's diamond jubilee. The church contains London's largest collection of pre-raphaelite stained glass by Morris, Marshall Faulkner & Co (later Morris & Co). The parish church of St Andrew is on Chase Side. Emmanuel Evangelical Church meets in Ashmole School. Southgate Methodist Church is on The Bourne, near Southgate Underground station. It was built in 1929, replacing a building on Chase Side. It is an active community hub.

=== Southgate Masonic Centre ===
The Southgate Masonic Centre is home to 160 Lodges of which 15 are from Middlesex, along with 5 Chapters. The Centre, a converted church hall, was opened in 1968. The Middlesex Lodges that joined had been meeting in pubs and similar venues and welcomed the opportunity to have their own Centre.

=== Oak Hill College ===
Oak Hill College is a theological college located on Chase Side. It trains both Anglican and Independent students for Church ministry in the UK and overseas.

=== Southgate Mosque ===
Southgate Mosque is located at Southgate House, Southgate High Street. It was founded in 2021 as a non-profit organisation dedicated to providing prayer facilities to the local Muslim community.

== Taverns, inns and public houses ==
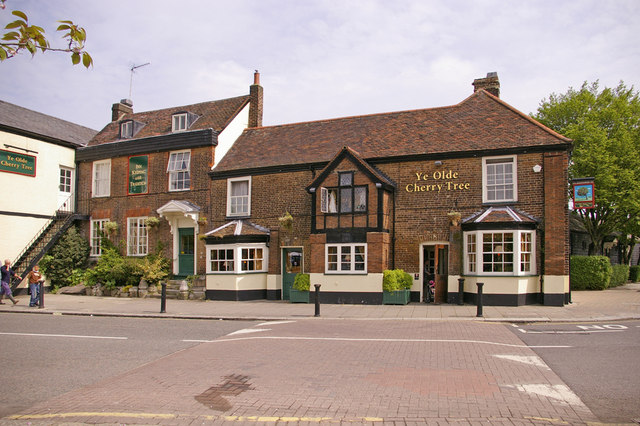
Ye Olde Cherry Tree, The Green.

Because of the age of the former village and its position in a ring of villages one day's travel by coach from London, Southgate had many pubs: within the village centre there were six local licensed premises.

Many were located on Chase Side but some, such as The Bell, The Crown and the Chase Gate Tavern, were demolished as part of 20th Century redevelopment and others have closed more recently; The Waggon (formerly Waggon and Horses) became an Anatolian restaurant in 2013. The Rising Sun was the terminus for a local horse-drawn omnibus service to Colney Hatch (and there to Kings Cross) before the arrival of the railways, whereupon the service switched to the new station in Palmers Green. It was rebuilt in 1932, and substantially renovated in 2008, changing its name to The Sun and later The Maze Inn but was subsequently closed in 2016 and demolished in 2019. The Crown is commemorated in the name of The New Crown on Chase Side. The Hart (formerly The White Hart) is the last long-standing pub in the immediate area, located on the adjoining Chase Road, near Southgate Circus roundabout.

Other notable local pubs are Ye Olde Cherry Tree which overlooks Southgate Green, and The Woodman on Bourne Hill. Former public house The Woolpack on the nearby High Street is now a restaurant.

== Local newspapers ==
The local newspapers are, as of 2018:

Newspaper	Link
Enfield Independent	

== See also ==
- Osidge
