= List of churches in the London Borough of Enfield =

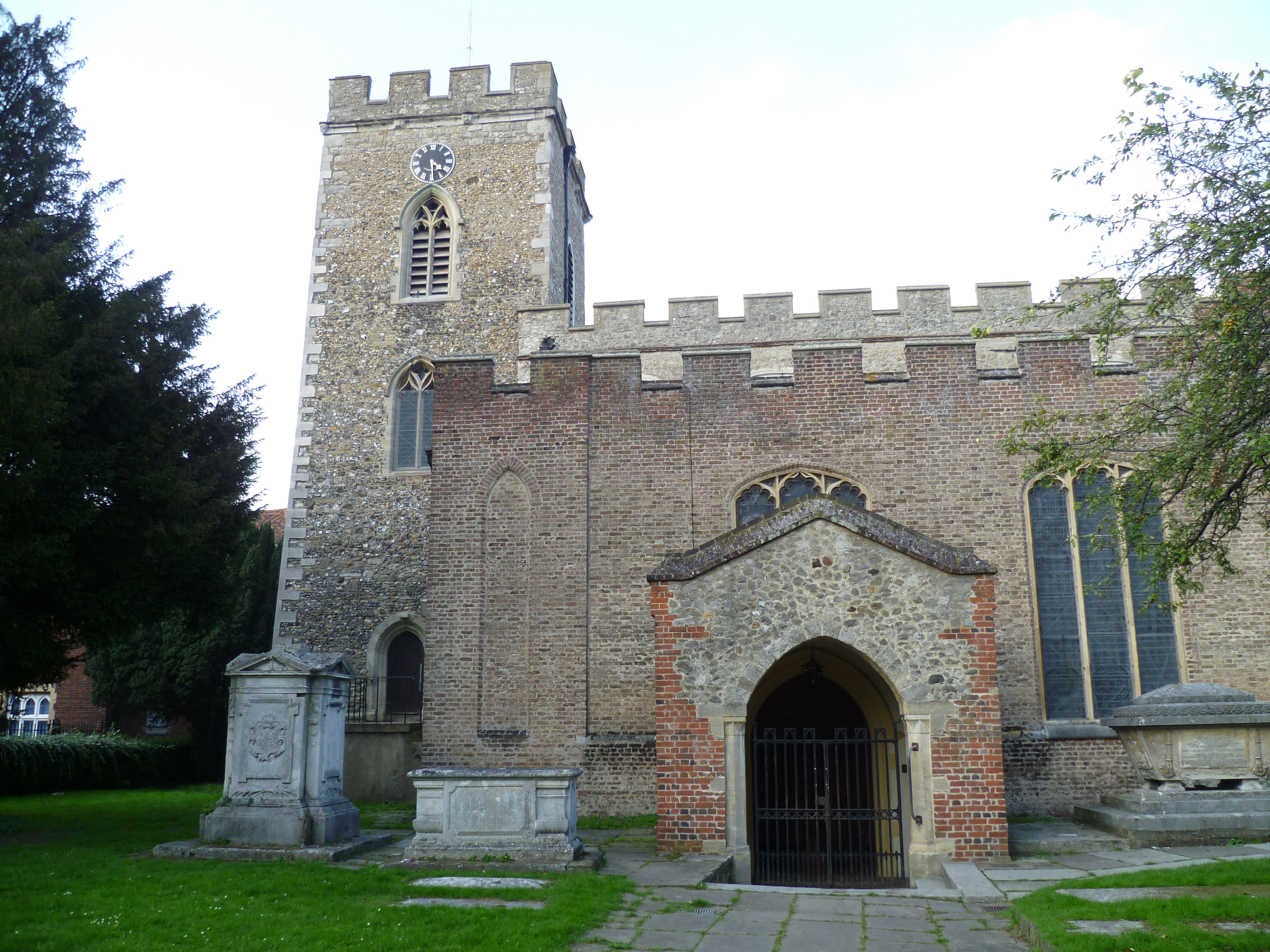
St Andrew's Enfield

This is a list of cathedrals, churches and chapels in the London Borough of Enfield within the Greater London. The list focuses on the more permanent churches and buildings which identify themselves as places of Christian worship. The denominations appended are those by which they self-identify.

== History ==
London's churches and chapels are numerous and diverse. Anglican and nonconformist churches and chapels are most numerous, but there are also many Catholic churches as well as places of worship for non-Christian religions.

Churches in this list belong to various denominations, as indicated.

== List of churches ==
The borough has an estimated 101 active churches for 331,400 inhabitants, a ratio of one church to every 3,281 people.

General resource:

=== Active churches ===
Church Name	Neighbourhood	Dedication	Web	Founded	Denom./Affiliation	Notes
All Saints, Edmonton	Edmonton	All Saints		C12th	Anglican	Rebuilt C15th
St Andrew, Enfield	Enfield	Andrew		C12th	Anglican	
St Paul, Winchmore Hill	Winchmore Hill	Paul		1828	Anglican	
St James, Enfield Highway	Enfield Highway	James		1831–1832	Anglican	
Jesus Church, Forty Hill	Forty Hill	Jesus		1835	Anglican	
Christ Church, Cockfosters	Cockfosters	Jesus		1839	Anglican	
St John the Baptist, Clay Hill	Clay Hill	John the Baptist		1856	Anglican	United with St Luke Clay Hill 1987
Christ Church, Southgate	Southgate	Jesus		1862	Anglican	Earlier chapel on site dates back to 1615
St Paul, New Southgate	New Southgate	Paul		1872–1873	Anglican	
St Michael & All Angels, Gordon Hill	Gordon Hill	Michael & Angels		1874	Anglican	
St Andrew, Southgate	Southgate	Andrew		1875	Anglican	Current building 1903–1915. Own parish 1928
St Matthew, Ponders End	Ponders End	Matthew		1877	Anglican	
St Mary Magdalene, Enfield	Enfield	Mary Magdalene		1883	Anglican	
St Mark, Enfield	Bush Hill Park	Mark		1885	Anglican	Current building 1893–1915
St Luke, Clay Hill	Clay Hill	Luke		1885	Anglican	Current building 1900. United with St John Clay Hill 1987
St Aldhelm, Edmonton	Edmonton	Aldhelm		1885	Anglican	Current building 1903
St Michael at Bowes	Bowes Park	Michael		c. 1890	Anglican	Rebuilt 1988
St Peter, Edmonton	Edmonton	Peter		1902	Anglican	
St Mary with St John, Upper Edmonton	Edmonton	John the Evangelist		1905	Anglican	Closed 2004 but re-opened 2012
St George, Enfield	Freezywater	George		1900–1906	Anglican	
St Stephen, Bush Hill Park	Bush Hill Park	Stephen		1907	Anglican	Own parish 1909
Holy Trinity, Winchmore Hill	Winchmore Hill	Trinity		1907	Anglican	
St John the Evangelist, Palmers Green	Palmers Green	John the Evangelist		1903–1908	Anglican	
St Paul, Hadley Wood	Hadley Wood	Paul		1911	Anglican	Independent of Christ Church Cockfosters 2000
St Peter, Grange Park	Grange Park	Peter		1920s	Anglican	Current building 1940–1941
SS Peter & Paul, Enfield Lock	Enfield Lock	Peter & Paul		1928	Anglican	Rebuilt 1969 after war damage
St Thomas, Oakwood	Oakwood	Thomas		1939	Anglican	
St Alphege, Edmonton	Edmonton	Ælfheah of C'bury		1957	Anglican	
Grace Church Highlands	Oakwood			2007	Anglican	Church plant from Christ Church Cockfosters
Enfield Sign Church	Enfield				Anglican	Services held in Enfield Baptist Church
Mary, Mother of God, Ponders End	Ponders End	Mary		1890	Roman Catholic	Current building 1921
Our L of Walsingham & English Martyrs, Enfield	Gordon Hill	Mary & Forty Martyrs		c. 1890	Roman Catholic	New building 1987
(Most Precious Blood &) St Edmund, Edmonton	Edmonton	??		1907	Roman Catholic	
St Monica, Palmers Green	Palmers Green	Monica		1914	Roman Catholic	
Our Lady of Lourdes, New Southgate	New Southgate	Mary		1923	Roman Catholic	Current building 1935
Christ the King, Cockfosters	Cockfosters	Jesus		1936	Roman Catholic	Building 1940. Served by the Olivetans until 2012
Our Lady of Mount Carmel & St George	Enfield	Mary & George		1863	Roman Catholic	
Holy Family of Nazareth Polish Catholic Mission	Enfield	Holy Family		2011	Polish Old Catholicism	
Syro-Malabar Catholic Church of London	New Southgate			2002	Syro-Malab Catholic	
St Demetrios Greek Orthodox Church	Edmonton	Dem of Thessaloniki			Greek Orthodox	Building originally St Martin's Church of England
SS Raphael, Nicholas & Irene of Lesbos Community	Enfield	Raph, Nich, Irene			Greek Orthodox	Services held in St George's Freezywater
Winchmore Hill Baptist Church	Winchmore Hill			1654	Baptist Union	Moved to new building in Winchmore Hill 1907
Enfield Baptist Church	Enfield			1867	Baptist Union	
Totteridge Road Baptist Church	Enfield Wash			1868	Baptist Union	
Palmers Green Baptist Church & New Life Church	Palmers Green			1878	Baptist Union	Building 1905. Baptist & Ind church (2008) merge 2015
Suffolks Baptist Church	Enfield			1938	Baptist Union	Own building 1957
Edmonton Baptist Church	Edmonton				Baptist Union	Current building 1976
Oakwood Baptist Church	Oakwood				Baptist Union	
Ponders End Methodist Church	Ponders End			1849	Methodist	Current building 1931
Ordnance Road Methodist Church	Enfield Wash			1859	Methodist	Rebuilt 1879, 1904, 1957
Grange Park Methodist Church	Grange Park			1920s	Methodist	Current building 1938
Southgate Methodist Church	Southgate			1929	Methodist	
St John's Methodist Church	Enfield	John?		1960	Methodist	
Trinity at Bowes Methodist Church	Bowes Park	Trinity			Methodist	
Bush Hill Park Methodist Church	Bush Hill Park				Methodist	
Edmonton Methodist Church	Edmonton				Methodist	
Winchmore Hill Methodist Church	Winchmore Hill				Methodist	
Trinity Church Enfield	Enfield	Trinity		1890	Methodist / URC	1983 merger of Enfield Methodist and St Paul's URC (1902)
Winchmore Hill United Reformed Church	Winchmore Hill			1742	URC	New buildings 1844, 1873
Christ Church United Reformed Church	Enfield	Jesus		1780	URC	Rebuilt 1875
Lancaster Road United Reformed Church	Enfield			1885	URC	Rebuilt 1938
Bush Hill Park United Reformed Church	Bush Hill Park				URC	
Faith House United Reformed Church	Edmonton				URC	
Palmers Green United Reformed Church	Palmers Green				URC	Shares minister with Winchmore Hill, Ponders End URCs
Ponders End United Reformed Church	Ponders End				URC	
Trinity Welsh Church	Cockfosters	Trinity			Welsh Presbyterian	
Edmonton Salvation Army	Edmonton				Salvation Army	
Enfield Salvation Army	Enfield				Salvation Army	
Enfield Evangelical Free Church	Enfield			1897	FIEC	Rebuilt 1956. Building purchased 2004, new build 2012
Bush Hill Park Community Church	Bush Hill Park				FIEC	Plant from Enfield Evangelical Free, meets in Gospel Hall
Silver Street Community Church	Edmonton			2015	FIEC	Church plant from Enfield Evangelical Free Church
Brethren Meeting House	New Southgate				Exclusive Brethren	
Friends' Meeting House	Winchmore Hill			c. 1670	Quakers	Current building 1790–1791
Edmonton Seventh-day Adventist Church	Edmonton				7th-day Adventist	Current building 1939
The Church, Enfield	Enfield				7th-d Adventist	
Tramway Christian Fellowship	Edmonton				Elim	
Lincoln Road Chapel	Ponders End			1949	Assemblies of God	
Church of God of Prophecy, Enfield	Edmonton				CoG of Prophecy	
Church of God of Prophecy, New Southgate	New Southgate				CoG of Prophecy	
Jubilee Church London	Enfield				Newfrontiers	
Enfield Vineyard Church	Enfield			1859	Vineyard (2015)	Formerly Brigadier Free Church
Restore Community Church (BE Church)	Winchmore Hill				Ichthus	Meet in local school. Prev. Southgate Christian Fellowship
The Potter's House, Enfield	Enfield			2009	Potter's House	
Revival Christian Church of Enfield	Enfield			2009	RCCG	
New Covenant Church Edmonton	Edmonton				NCC Worldwide	
Bury Street Chapel	Bush Hill Park			1838	Independent	
Edmonton Baptist Chapel	Edmonton			1889	Independent	New buildings 1913, 1989
Albany Church	Enfield Wash			1898	Independent	Began as a Brethren church, left the Brethren 1996
Leighton Road Gospel Hall	Bush Hill Park			1910	Independent	
Chase Family Church	Enfield			1968	Independent	Began as Winchmore Hill Christian Fellowship
Riverside Community Church	Bowes Park				Independent	
New River @ Croyland Church	Edmonton				Independent	
Inspirational Charismatic Church – House of Prayer	Edmonton				Independent	
Tanner's End Free Church	Edmonton				Independent	May be defunct
The King's House	Edmonton				Independent	
Pentecost Covenant Chapel UK	Edmonton				Independent	Meets at the Angel Community Centre
Victory in Christ Ministries	Ponders End				Independent	

=== Defunct churches ===
Church name	Neighbourhood	Dedication	Founded	Ended	Denomination	Notes
St Mary, Edmonton	Edmonton	Mary	1884	1957	Anglican	Demolished
St Martin, Edmonton	Edmonton	Martin of Tours	1911	1977	Anglican	Now used as St Demetrios Greek Orthodox church

== Related lists ==
- List of churches in London
- List of Christopher Wren churches in London
- List of places of worship in London, 1804
- Union of Benefices Act 1860
- Commission for Building Fifty New Churches

== External links/sources ==
- Anglican Diocese of London
- Baptist Union Churches
- Church of England Parish Finder
- Church of England churches in central London
- The Church of Jesus Christ of Latter-day Saints
- The History Files Churches of the British Isles
- Congregational Churches in London
- Friends of the City Churches
- Gospel Hall Finder
- Greek Orthodox Archdiocese of Thyateira and Great Britain
- Love's Guide to the Church Bells of the City of London
- Methodist Church of Great Britain Church Search
- Roman Catholic Diocese of Brentwood Parishes A-Z
- Roman Catholic Diocese of Westminster – Virtual Diocese
- Roman Catholic Archdiocese of Southwark – Parish Directory
- Seventh-day Adventist Churches in London
- United Reformed Church Find A Church
- Redeemed Christian Church of God
