= Coat of arms of the London Borough of Enfield =

- Crest: On a Wreath Or and Azure a Stag's Head proper wreathed about the neck with a Garland of Roses Gules barbed seeded slipped and leaved proper.
- Shield: Or on a Fesse wavy Vert a Bar wavy Argent charged with a Barrulet wavy Azure over all an Enfield rampant Gules.
- Supporters: On the dexter side a Lion Gules gorged with a Collar engrailed with Chain reflexed over the back and charged with a Saltire couped Or and on the sinister side an Enfield Gules.
- Motto: 'BY INDUSTRY EVER STRONGER'

The coat of arms of the London Borough of Enfield is the official heraldic arms of the London Borough of Enfield, granted on 15 August 1966.

Coat of arms of the former Municipal Borough of Enfield

The main charge on the shield is a mythological animal sometimes used in heraldry. This beast is called an enfield, thus making the arms canting. Like many medieval mythological creatures, the enfield is composed of parts from different real animals: the enfield has the head of a fox, the forelegs of an eagle, the chest of a hound but the rest of the body like a lion and the hindlegs and tail of a wolf. An enfield was also present in the coat of arms of the former Municipal Borough of Enfield. The bars in green, silver and blue behind the red enfield represent New River, the Green Belt areas and open spaces in general.

The crest contains a stag's head with a wreath of red roses, derived from the supporters in the coat of arms of the Municipal Borough of Southgate, where the stag represented the forests of the area and the roses stood for the Duchy of Lancaster, the well-known red rose of Lancaster.

While the supporter to the right is a chained lion with a saltire, like the supporters in the coat of arms of the former Municipal Borough of Edmonton, representing courage and determination, the left supporter is the same enfield as in the coat of arms itself.

The arms can be seen in relief, in full colour, on the façade of Enfield Civic Centre.

== See also ==
- Armorial of London
