= Chace Community School =

Secondary school in north London, England

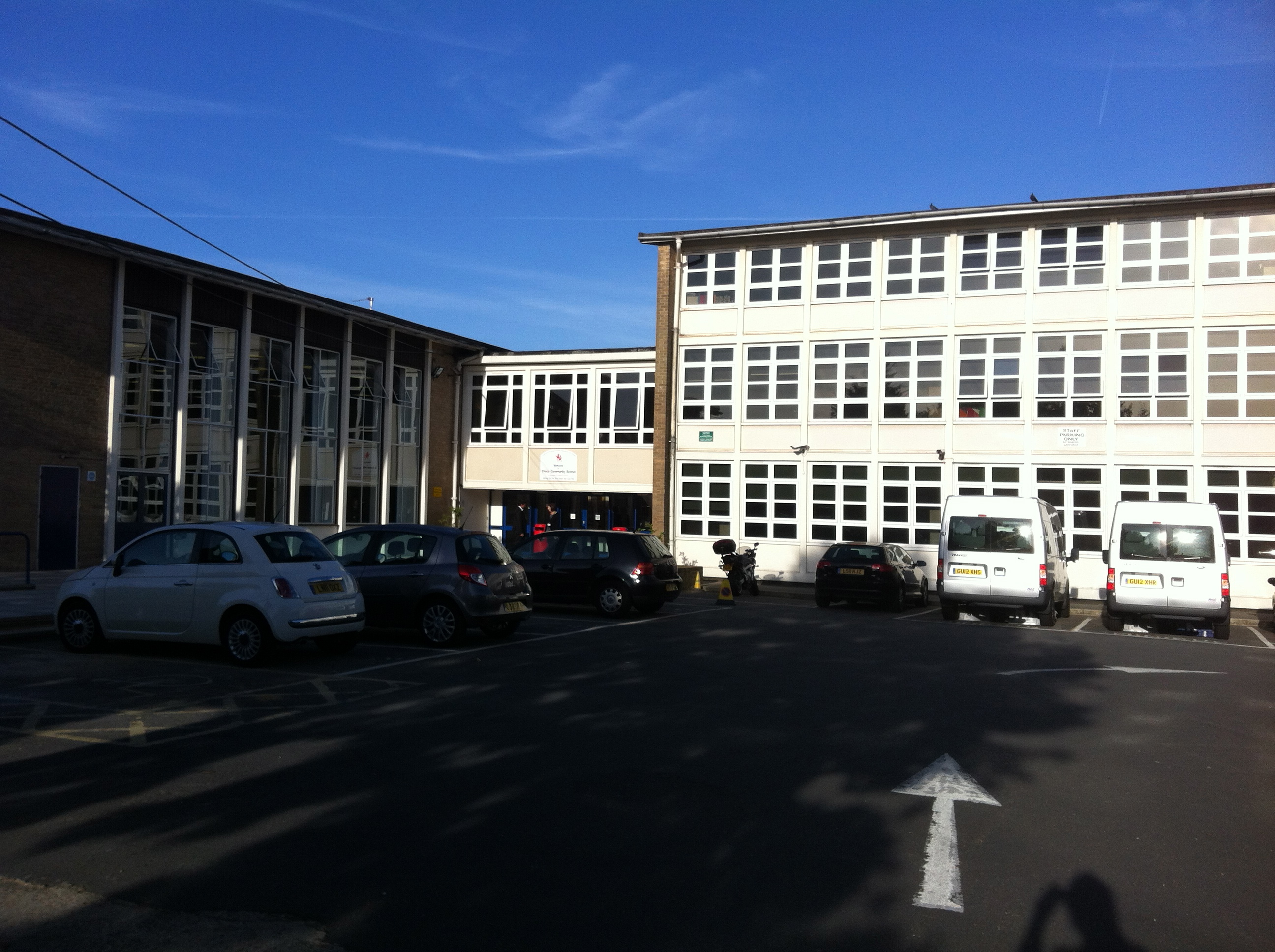
- The front entrance of Chace Community School

Location
- Churchbury Lane; Enfield Town, London, EN1 3HQ; England; 51.66126°N 0.07522°W

Information
- Type: Community school
- Established: 1956; 70 years ago
- Local authority: Enfield
- Department for Education URN: 102049 Tables
- Ofsted: Reports
- Head teacher: Tanya Douglas
- Gender: mixed
- Age: 11 to 18
- Enrolment: 1257
- Website: www.chace.enfield.sch.uk

Chace Community School is a coeducational secondary school and sixth form located in Forty Hill, Enfield Town, England. It is situated on Churchbury Lane with its fields backing on to Baker Street. Chace is spelled with a 'c' rather than a 's', despite the school being close to the Chase Side area of Enfield. The school logo is the Enfield (the same as the London Borough of Enfield logo). Its colours are navy and gold.

== Houses ==
Until September 2003, the school had four houses, named after four local large estates. These are listed below with the house colour in brackets.

- Capel (red) named after Capel Manor. Now the home of Capel Manor College for agricultural related studies
- Myddelton (green) named after Myddelton House. Now the home of Myddelton House Gardens
- Trent (blue) named after Trent House. Now within Middlesex University
- Whitewebbs (yellow) named after Whitewebbs House. Now a Toby Carvery pub.

== Performance ==
=== GCSE level (Key Stage 4) ===
The school is in the top half of the Enfield league table with 89% achieving 5 GCSEs at grade C or above in 2009.. In 2008, 44% achieved 5 GCSEs at Grade C or above (including Maths and English).Chace Community School

=== A Level (Key Stage 5) ===
In 2005, the average UCAS points score was 211.5 per student, equivalent to 3 grade B at A Level.

QCA Points

In 2006 the average points score per examination entry was 235.5, equivalent to just under a grade B at A level.Chace Community School

In 2007 the average points score per examination entry was 242.8, equivalent to just over a grade B at A level.Chace Community School

In 2008 the average points score per examination entry was 278.3, equivalent to just under a grade A at A Level.Chace Community School

== Headteachers ==
- Current: Tanya Douglas
- Past: Mrs Hill, Mr Higgins, Sue Warrington, Daniel Bruton

== Notable former pupils ==
- Will Antwi — Anglo-Ghanaian footballer
- Bambos Charalambous — Labour Party MP for Enfield Southgate
- Malcolm Needs — screenwriter
- Michelle Ryan — English actress
- Paul Whitehouse — comedian and actor
- John Wilson — angling writer and broadcaster
