= Enfield (heraldry) =

Fictiotus creature of heraldic

The Coat of arms of the London Borough of Enfield that includes the Enfield as the main charge as well as the sinister supporter

The enfield is a fictitious creature sometimes used in heraldry.

== Description ==
The enfield has the head of a fox, forelegs like an eagle's talons, the chest of a greyhound, the body of a lion, and the hindquarters and tail of a wolf. It is occasionally portrayed with wings.

== O'Kelly ==
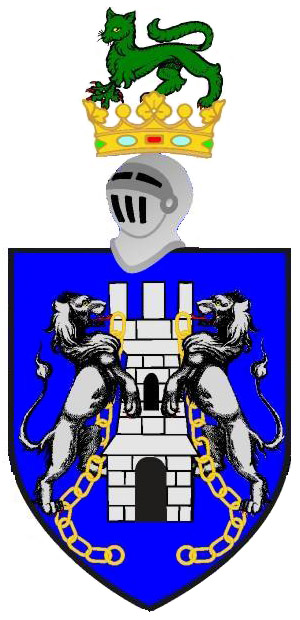
The coat of arms of the O Kelly of Ui Maine, featuring a green enfield as the crest

The earliest known example of the enfield is the crest of the Ó Cellaigh clan of Ireland. Ó Cellaigh of Uí Maine are the most documented O'Kelly sept in early Irish history and annals. The enfield appears in Leabhar Ua Maine.

The ancient tradition among the O'Kellys is that they have borne this fabulous animal since the days of King Tadhg Mór Ua Cellaigh who fell "fighting like a wolf dog" on the side of the High King of Ireland, Brian Boru, at the Battle of Clontarf in 1014. When Tadhg Mor fell this mythical beast issued from the nearby sea to protect the dead body of the chief until it was retrieved for proper burial by his kinsmen.

The animal is sculptured on many old (c. 1375–1650) tombstones of the O'Kelly family in the Abbey of Kilconnell (founded ca. 1353 by King William Buidhe Ó Cellaigh), and in the old church of Cloonkeen.

In 1859, an excavation project found a bronze 15th century O'Kelly seal 20 ft deep in a bog, prompting considerable research on the origins of the O'Kelly enfield on the seal:

I have searched in several works on heraldry for a description of the enfield, but without success. It does not appear to be a cognizance of much in use, and it does not appear to be found in Gwillam's "Display of Heraldry" folio: not even in Cap 26 of that book, which chapter treats solely of fictitious creatures, supposed to be compounded of different kinds and natures, such as Griffons, Wiverns, dragons, cockatrices, harpies, mermaids. Neither is the term enfield given or explained in Crossley's "Signification of things borne in Heraldry". To my gifted friend, Sir Bernard Burke, Ulster King of Arms, I, however am indebted for the following definition of this composite fabulous creature, viz. :— "The Enfield is a heraldic animal, having the head of a fox, the breast feathered as an eagle's, the foreclaws also of an eagle; the remainder of the body that of a wolf." It follows from such description that the enfield, being compounded of the fox, eagle, and wolf, indicated that he, by whom it was borne, was reputed to possess the subtlety and cunning of the first named beast; the magnanimity and fortitude, with the honour, labor, industry, and diligence, in great manners, of the eagle; and the fierceness of the wolf.

Williams (1989) suggests that the enfield on the crest of the O'Kelly's is derived from the onchú.

== Modern uses ==
The beast was on the coat of arms of the Municipal Borough of Enfield, which was amalgamated with the Municipal Borough of Edmonton and the Municipal Borough of Southgate to form the London Borough of Enfield. It is unclear whether the beast has any historic connection with the town, but it still makes a striking example of canting arms. It is used on the logo and the modern coat of arms of the London Borough of Enfield and as an emblem by some organisations there: for example, on the badges of Enfield County School, Chace Community School, Enfield Ignatians R.F.C. and of the football clubs Brimsdown F.C., Enfield (1893) F.C. and Enfield Town F.C., as well as Oneida FC.

In Australia, it was used in the crest of the former City of Enfield, South Australia (which was named after the London borough), and is still used by the Enfield Brass Band. It was also used as the centrepiece of the squadron crest of 38 Squadron of the Royal Australian Air Force, in Queensland.
