= Southgate Town Hall =

Municipal building in London, England

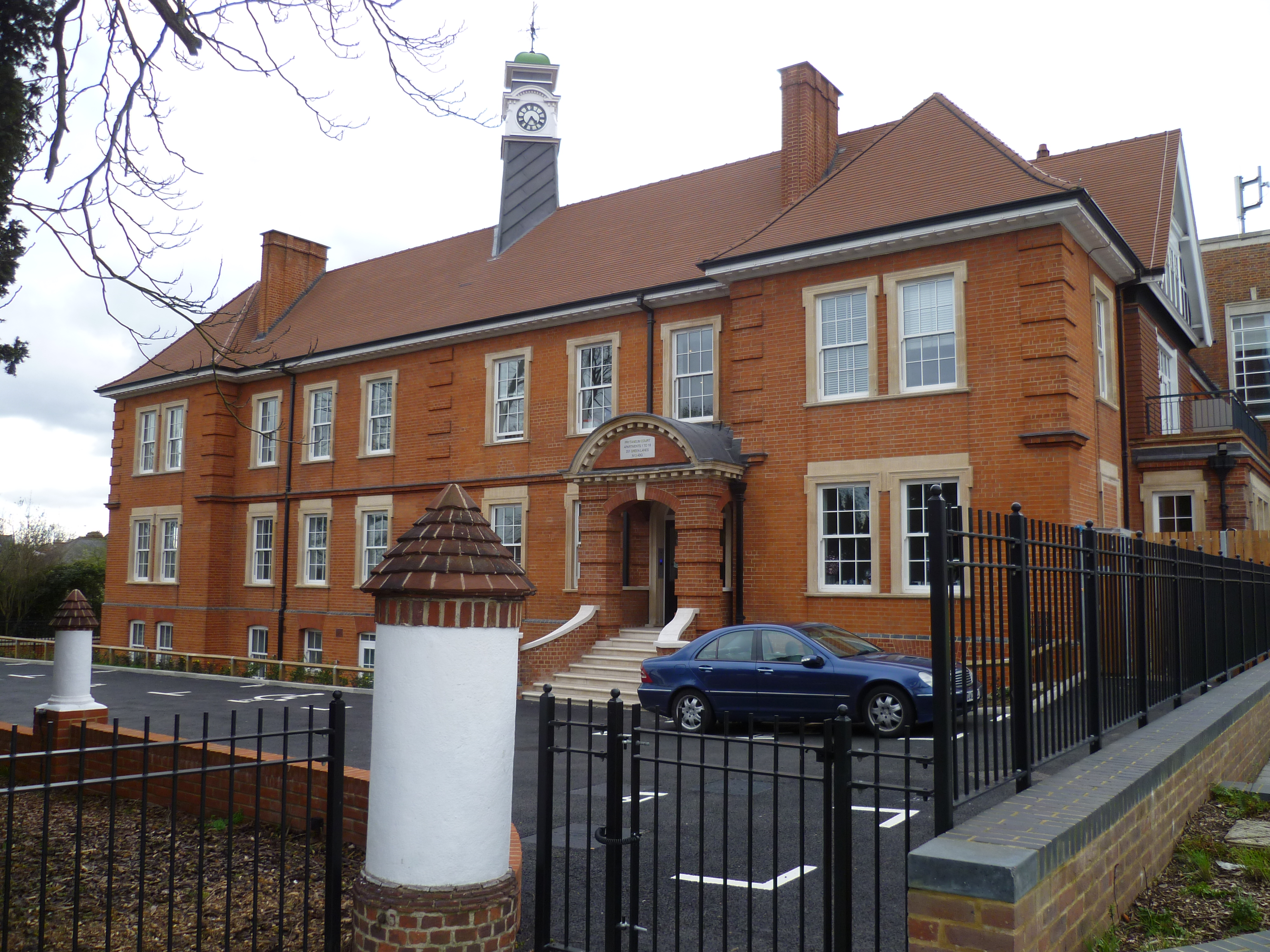
- Southgate Town Hall

- Shown in Enfield
- 51.6154°N 0.1102°W
- Location: Palmers Green

History
- Built: 1893

Site notes
- Architect: Arthur Rowland Barker
- Architectural style: Queen Anne style

Southgate Town hall is a municipal building in Green Lanes, Palmers Green, London.

== History ==
The building was commissioned by the local board of health as dedicated municipal offices in anticipation of Southgate becoming an urban district in 1894. The site they selected was agricultural land associated with Bowes Farm.

The municipal offices, the northern section of the current complex, were designed by Arthur Rowland Barker in the Queen Anne style and completed in 1893. The design involved an asymmetrical main frontage with five bays facing onto Green Lanes; there was a porch in the middle of the building and the right hand two bays projected forwards and there were rows of sash windows on the ground floor and first floor. In 1914, the building was extended southwards by adding another five bays: this time the left hand two bays projected forward to achieve a symmetrical composition, and a clock tower was added on the roof. The principal room in the extension was the new council chamber. A stone name plaque bearing the coat of arms of the borough with the words "Southgate Town Hall" below was erected on the front elevation of the building.

The building became the headquarters of the Municipal Borough of Southgate when the area was granted municipal borough status in 1933. A public library, which subsequently became known as "Palmers Green library", was erected to the north west of the main building in April 1940. The town hall served as the local Civil Defence Control Centre during the Second World War. Princess Alexandra, who had already visited the building as a child, visited it again in 1961.

The building ceased to function as the local of seat of government when the enlarged London Borough of Enfield was formed in 1965. It was subsequently used as the Local History Archive until 2009 when it was deemed surplus to requirements and marketed for sale. It was acquired by the developer, Hollybrook Homes, in November 2013 and conversion of the property for residential use as "Prytaneum Court" (Prytaneion is a Greek word meaning "seat of government") was completed in September 2015.

As part of the transaction the developer agreed to undertake a programme of refurbishment works at a cost of £4.45 million at Palmers Green Library. The memorials commemorating council employees who had died in the First and the Second World Wars had been recovered from the town hall before it was converted and rededicated at Palmers Green Library in January 2019.

== Use by media ==
The former town hall is used to represent Cowley police station in the drama series Endeavour.
