= Wolves in heraldry =

Heraldic animal

Coat of arms of Łobez, Poland

The wolf has been widely used in many forms in heraldry during the Middle Ages. Though commonly reviled as a livestock predator and man-eater, the wolf was also considered a noble and courageous animal, and frequently appeared on the arms and crests of numerous noble families. It typically symbolised the rewards of perseverance in long sieges or hard industry.

== History ==
=== British Isles and other Anglophone heraldries ===
Wolves appear frequently in English heraldry, and is found as both a charge and a supporter. Wolves' heads, without the rest of the body being depicted, are particularly common in Scottish heraldry.

Early depictions of wolves in heraldry tend to be somewhat ambiguous in appearance, and can be confused with other heraldic creatures such as lynxes and foxes.

Edward IV (1442–83) used a white wolf for one of his badges, along with a white lion, denoting his descent from the House of Mortimer.

The wolf or his head is often used for canting on names such as Videlou, de Lou (both recorded in the anonymous Great Roll of 1308–14), Lupus (in the reign of Edward III), Wolferston (in the Henry VI Roll, circa 1422–61), Wolseley, Lovett, Low, Lovell, Lupton and of course Wolfe.

Wolves are to be found

- rampant in the coat of Louth Town Council (England)
- demi in the crest of Peter John Crabtree (Canada)
- demi and winged in the crest of Walter William Roy Bradford (Canada)
- heads only in the coat of James Thomas Flood (Canada)
- as supporters in the bearings of the Corporation of the Municipality of Greenstone, Ontario
- in the Salish style in the coat of the Village of Belcarra, British Columbia

The "Enfield beast", an imaginary creature with the combined head of a fox, front talons of an eagle and legs and tail of a wolf, appears as the crest of the Irish family of Kelly and is also used in the coat and as a supporter for the former Enfield Borough Council and its successor the London Borough of Enfield (England).

=== Continental Europe ===
The wolf is also featured in the heraldry of continental European nations. Wolves feature very commonly in Spanish heraldry, where they are often represented wolves carrying the bodies of lambs in their mouths or across their backs. When in such a pose, wolves are referred to as being ravissant.

Wolves are also common in German heraldry. The town of Passau (Bavaria) bears a red wolf rampant on a white shield. In Saxony, a black wolf rampant on a yellow shield features on the crest of von Wolfersdorf family. A green wolf grasping a dead swan in its jaws on a yellow shield is depicted on the crest and Arms of the Counts von Brandenstein-Zeppelin.

In Italian heraldry, the attributed arms of Romulus and Remus were said to depict the Capitoline Wolf. An undated Milanese badge allegedly in the Biblioteca Trivulziana, Milan, shows a lamb lying on its back with a wolf standing over it.

In French heraldry, the Wolfcatcher Royal had as his official insignia two wolf heads facing frontally.

A horned, wolf-like creature called the Calopus or Chatloup was at one time connected with the Foljambe and Cathome family.

Modernly, the coat of arms of the secular separatists in Chechnya bore the wolf, because the wolf (borz) is the Chechen (or Ichkerian) nation's national embodiment. The Islamists later removed it, and the Russian-sponsored ruling regime removed it entirely, but the secular government in exile still uses. In addition, many other insignia of the Chechen nation (of all three governments) use the wolf as a heraldic symbol. Not only is it the national animal, but the Chechen people are symbolically said to be variously related to wolves (not in a serious way, but in an either symbolic or joking manner), and there are legends of their ancestors being raised by a "wolf mother". Characteristics of the wolf are also frequently compared to the Chechen people in a poetic sense, including the most famous line that members of the Chechen nation are "free and equal like wolves".

== Examples of wolves in heraldry ==
A common Basque depiction of a heraldic wolf (Salazar, Navarre).

A coat of arms of the Sipoo municipality (Finland)

A coat of arms of the Valtimo municipality (Finland)

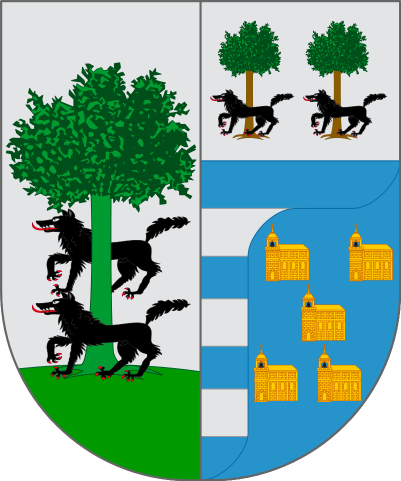
A coat of arms of the town of Busturia (Basque Country, Spain)

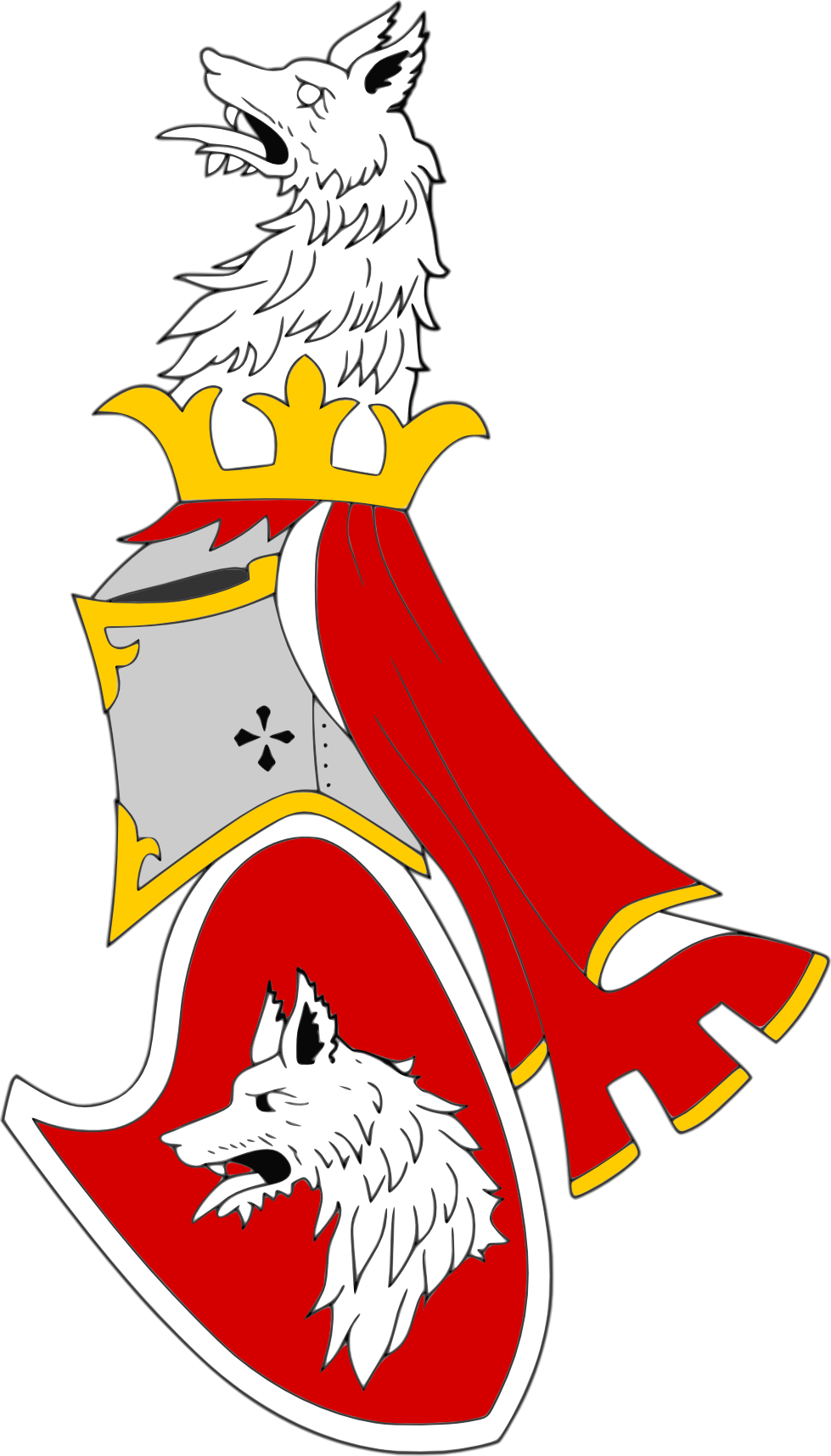
Sigil of the noble house Balšić.

Emblem of the 1st CBRN Regiment 'Valencia' (Spanish Army).

Chechen (Ichkerian) seal bearing a wolf, the nation's symbolic embodiment.

Namık İsmail's proposed coat of arms of Turkey, bearing the wolf Asena
