= List of people from the London Borough of Enfield =

The following list includes notable people associated with the London Borough of Enfield.

- Andy Abraham (b. 1964) – singer
- Abz Love (b. Richard Breen, 1979) – musician
- Adele (b. 1988) – singer/songwriter
- Kacey Barnfield (b. 1988) – actress
- Joseph Bazalgette (1819–1891) – civil engineer who rescued London's sewerage system
- Sir Anthony Berry (1925–1984) – politician
- Black the Ripper (1987–2020) - rapper, entrepreneur and cannabis activist
- James Blake (b. 1988) – musician
- Bernard Bresslaw (1934–1993) – actor
- David Burrowes (b. 1969) – politician
- Chas & Dave
- Charles Childerstone (1872-1947), tenor and actor
- Roy Chipolina (b. 1983) – footballer
- Dodie Clark (b. 1995) – musician
- Charles Cowden Clarke (1787–1877) – author
- Sharon D. Clarke (b. 1966) – actress and singer
- Benjamin Clementine - singer/songwriter
- Jim Crace (b. 1946) – writer
- Paul Dacre - former Daily Mail editor
- John Dalton (b. 1943) – musician, bassist with the Kinks
- Alfie Deyes (b. 1993) – YouTuber and businessman
- Benjamin Disraeli (1804–1881) – politician, prime minister and novelist
- Isaac D'Israeli (1766–1848) – writer
- Michael Duberry (b. 1975) – footballer
- Rick Edwards (b. 1979) – radio and television presenter
- Tim Eggar (b. 1951) – politician
- Neale Fenn (b. 1977) – football player and manager
- Caroline Flack (1979–2020) – television presenter
- Bruce Forsyth (1928–2017) – TV personality
- John French (1907–1966) – photographer
- Mike Gatting (b. 1957) – cricketer
- Anthony Giddens (b. 1938) - sociologist
- Alison Goldfrapp (b. 1966)
- Alan Hopes
- Chris Hughes (b. 1947) – quiz contestant
- Nigar Jamal
- David Jason
- Jay1 - rapper
- Hugh Jenkins, Baron Jenkins of Putney – politician
- Russell Kane – comedian
- Boris Karloff – actor
- John Keats – poet
- Joe Keyes – rugby league player
- Charles Lamb – poet and essayist
- Norman Lewis
- Terry Lightfoot
- Nikki Lilly (b. 2003) – YouTuber
- Jake Livermore
- Andy Love
- Iain Macleod – politician
- Simon Mayo
- Declan McKenna (b. 1998) – singer-songwriter, music producer, and activist
- Paul McKenna
- Julia McKenzie
- Norris McWhirter
- Ross McWhirter
- Colin Metson
- Ron Moody
- Gregory Motton – playwright
- Dave Murray – musician, guitarist for Iron Maiden
- Harrison Palmer – cricketer
- Walter Pater – writer
- Trevor Peacock – actor
- William Pitt, Earl of Chatham (1708–1778) – Prime Minister and statesman
- Lee Pluck (b. 1982) – football player with Barnet and Cambridge City
- Michael Portillo – politician
- Kathryn Prescott (b. 1991) – actress
- Megan Prescott (b. 1991) – actress
- Michelle Ryan (b. 1984) – EastEnders actress
- Scorcher (b. 1986) – rapper, actor, producer
- Sam Sloma (b. 1982) - footballer
- Nathan Smith (b. 1987) – footballer
- William Smith (1813–1893) – lexicographer
- Louie Spence (b. 1969) - dancer
- Rachel Stevens (b. 1978) – singer/songwriter, band member of S Club 7
- Derek Taunt
- Norman Tebbit, Lord Tebbit
- Alan Teulon, land surveyor
- Professor Philip Tew
- Andrew Turnbull, Baron Turnbull
- Stephen Twigg
- Chris Walker-Hebborn – swimmer, gold medallist in 100m backstroke at the 2014 European Championships and Commonwealth Games
- Murray Walker
- Jessie Wallace (b. 1971) – EastEnders actress
- Tion Wayne - rapper
- Neil 'Roberto' Williams – radio and television presenter
- Paul Whitehouse
- Amy Winehouse (1983–2011) – singer/songwriter
- Ray Winstone
- Emma D'Arcy
- Ritchie Edhouse (b. 1983) - professional darts player
