= Municipal Borough of Enfield =

Former local government district in the UK

Coordinates: 51.67°N 0.09°W

Enfield
- Enfield within Middlesex in 1961
- Area
  - 1911: 12,601 acres (50.99 km^{2})
  - 1961: 12,400 acres (50 km^{2})
- Population
  - 1901: 42,378
  - 1961: 109,542
- History
  - Created: 1850
  - Abolished: 1965
  - Succeeded by: London Borough of Enfield
- Status: Local board (1850 - 1894); Urban district (1894 - 1955); Municipal borough (from 1955)
- Government
  - HQ: Little Park, Gentleman's Row 1888 - 1961; Civic Centre, Silver Street 1961 - 1965
  - Motto: Priora Cole Meliora Sequere (Cherish the past but strive after even better things in the future)
- Coat of Arms

Enfield was a local government district in Middlesex, England from 1850 to 1965.

== History ==
The parish of Enfield adopted the Public Health Act 1848 (11 & 12 Vict. c. 63) in 1850, and formed a local board of health of 12 members to govern the area. The local board's area was reconstituted by the Local Government Act 1894, and became Enfield Urban District. Enfield Urban District Council replaced the local board, and was divided into four wards each returning three councillors: Town, Chase & Bull's Cross, Ordnance and Green Street & Ponders End. In 1909 two new wards, Bush Park and Hadley Wood & Cockfosters were formed and the UDC increased to 18 councillors.

The urban district council successfully petitioned for a charter of incorporation in 1955, becoming a municipal borough, with a corporation consisting of a mayor, ten aldermen and thirty councillors replacing the urban district council. The municipal borough was divided into ten wards, each returning three councillors: Bush Hill Park, Cambridge Road, Chase, Enfield Wash, Green Street, Ordnance, Ponders End, Town, West and Willow.

The borough was abolished under the London Government Act 1963 was merged with the Municipal Borough of Southgate and the Municipal Borough of Edmonton to form the London Borough of Enfield on 1 April 1965.

The borough included what is now known as Enfield Town, along with other settlements such as Brimsdown, Enfield Wash and Ponders End.

The urban district council was granted a coat of arms by the College of Arms in 1946. This featured an "enfield" (a rare heraldic beast) and a green chief with silver and blue wavy bars representing the New River, the Metropolitan Green Belt areas and open spaces. The crest was a stag representing Enfield Chase with a red rose for the Duchy of Lancaster. On incorporation as a borough, the council was eligible for a further grant of supporters, and a stag and an enfield were added on either side of the shield. Much of the same symbolism was carried over to the new coat of arms of the London Borough of Enfield when the London Borough was created.
