= Enfield Croquet Club =

Sports club in London, England

Enfield Croquet Club is a sports group in Greater London, England.

Following a croquet course run by Enfield London Borough Council, those completing the course were offered the chance to form a club, and in 1991 Enfield Croquet Club was established in Bush Hill Park recreation ground, between Lincoln Road and Southbury Road, in the London Borough of Enfield.

At first only Association Croquet was played, but later in 2005 Golf Croquet was introduced. The club currently has three full size lawns and its members compete in various inter-club Association Croquet and Golf Croquet competitions in the East Anglia Croquet Federation.

The club is a full member of the Croquet Association, the national governing body for the sport.

== Honours ==
- EACF AC Beds & Herts League (2000, 2003, 2012, 2015, 2024)
- EACF AC Playoff Winners (2000, 2012)
- EACF GC B-Level League (2018, 2019, 2021, 2022)
- EACF GC Handicap League (2009, 2011, 2012, 2021)
- Longman Cup (2016)
