= John Wilson (angler) =

British angler (1943–2018)

John Dennis Wilson MBE
- Wilson in 2018
- Born: 1943; Enfield, London, England
- Died: 13 November 2018 (aged 74–75); Thailand
- Known for: Television programmes on angling, author of many books on fishing

John Dennis Wilson MBE (1943 – 13 November 2018) was a British angler who had been involved with angling television production for over twenty years featuring on ITV, Channel 4 Television and more recently on the digital TV channel, Discovery Real Time. Wilson was voted 'The Greatest Angler of all Time' in a 2004 poll by readers of the Angling Times Newspaper.

== Early and personal life ==
Wilson was born in Enfield, London, where he attended the Chace Boys School. He fished on several local waters including the River Lea and later fished further afield. He had careers in hairdressing, the Merchant Navy and printing before opening his own fishing tackle shop based in Norwich in 1971.

Wilson lived at Great Witchingham, Norfolk, where he fished on his local River Wensum and owned his own lake complex before moving to Thailand in 2013. After living in Thailand for five years, Wilson announced his intention to move back to the UK.

He was appointed an MBE in the 2009 Queen's Birthday Honours.

Wilson died in Thailand on 13 November 2018 following a stroke two days previously. A service in memory of Wilson took place at Norwich Cathedral on 24 May 2019. The Field (magazine) named him as one of the ten most influential anglers of the past 160 years.

== Published works ==
Wilson was best known for his television programmes throughout the 80's and 90's, which cover coarse fishing, game fishing and sea angling. He had fished all over the world in locations such as the River Nile, Zambezi, Fraser River system and River Ebro as well as many locations within the UK. Target species were varied from coarse fish such as pike, perch and carp to exotic species such as sturgeon, shark and catfish.

Wilson's last series, John Wilson's Dream Fishing, aired in Autumn 2008 on Discovery Real Time. The series featured Wilson, his daughter Lisa Wilson and nephew Martin Bowler, going 'dream' fishing across the world including New York State, Norway, Scotland and Wales.

Wilson was also an author on the subject with several published works, and wrote a column for the Sunday Express newspaper until 2009, and continued to write within the UK angling press.

== Television series and available DVDs ==
- Go Fishing (1986–2002)
- Go Fishing Specials (?–2002)
- John Wilson's Fishing Safari (2004)
- John Wilson's Dream Fishing (2007)
- John Wilson's 20 Greatest Catches (2008)
- John Wilson's Fishing World (2009)

== Books ==
- A Specimen Fishing Year (His first book published in 1977) ISBN 0 7136 1799 3
- Where to Fish in Norfolk and Suffolk (1985)(1996) ISBN 0-7117-0183-0
- Wilson's Angle (1993)
- Catch Pike (1994)
- "Go Fishing" Year (A Channel Four book) (1991)
- The Complete Coarse Fisherman (1996) ISBN 1-85283-155-3
- John Wilson's Coarse Fishing Method Manual (1997)
- "Go Fishing": Programme Notes from the Anglia Television Series Presented by John Wilson (1997)
- Fifty Years a Fisherman (1999)
- John Wilson's Fishing Encyclopedia (2000)
- John Wilson's Book of Baits (2001)
- Catch Carp and Tench with John Wilson (2001)
- John Wilson's Little Book of Knots (2002)
- John Wilson's Greatest Fishing Adventures (2002)
- The Definitive Guide on Where to Fish in Norfolk and Suffolk (2002) ISBN 0-9531851-8-4
- John Wilson's World of Fishing (2004)
- Another Fishing Year (2006)
- John Wilson's 1001 Top Angling Tips (2007)
- Sixty years a Fisherman (2008)
- Catfishing: A Practical Guide - Foreword
- 'The Biggest Fish Of All' by The Perchfishers (2011) - Contributor

== Other ==
In addition to his television and written work, Wilson had his own branded range of fishing tackle covering everything from fishing rods and fishing reels to sunglasses.
