= Onchú =

Mythical Irish animal

An onchú is an animal in Irish mythology. It is listed in the 12th-century Cogad Gáedel re Gallaib (The War of the Irish with the Foreigners) amongst the venomous beasts.

An onchú is mentioned in Cathréim Cellaig (Cellach's Victory). It terrorised the land between Loch Con and Loch Cuilin. The hero Muiredach (brother of the murdered Cellach of Killala) chased it into a lake and killed it after it had killed several of his party.

A suggested, but uncertain, etymology of its name is that on is water and cú is dog – thus water-dog.

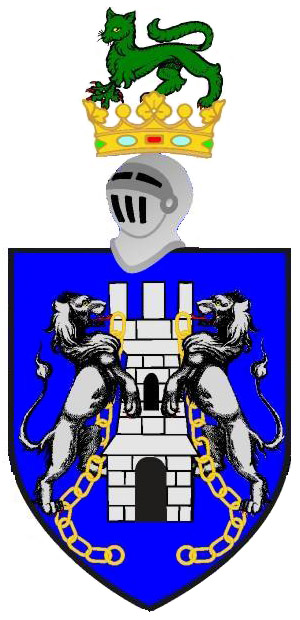
The coat of arms of the O Kelly of Ui Maine, featuring a green enfield as the crest

It has been used as a heraldic device, including on the battle flag of the Irish in 1595. Williams (1989) suggests that the enfield on the crest of the O'Kellys is derived from the onchú.
