= Bush Hill Park =

Coordinates: 51.6429°N 0.0736°W

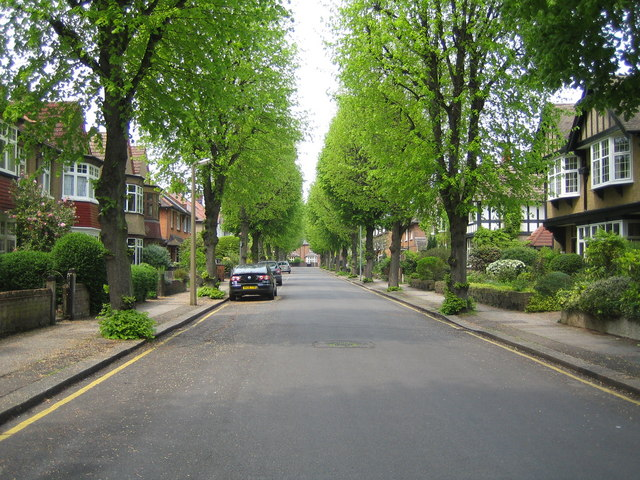
- Abbey Road

- Location within Greater London
- OS grid reference: TQ333955
  - Charing Cross: 12.9 mi (20.8 km)
- London borough: Enfield
- Ceremonial county: Greater London
- Region: London
- Country: England
- Sovereign state: United Kingdom
- Post town: ENFIELD
- Postcode district: EN1
- Dialling code: 020
- Police: Metropolitan
- Fire: London
- Ambulance: London
- UK Parliament: Edmonton and Winchmore Hill
- London Assembly: Enfield and Haringey

Bush Hill Park is an area of Enfield, located to the south-east of Enfield Town, on the outskirts of north London, and historically in Middlesex. Much of the district is a planned suburban estate, developed mainly in the late-19th and early-20th centuries, and designated a conservation area in 1986.

== History ==
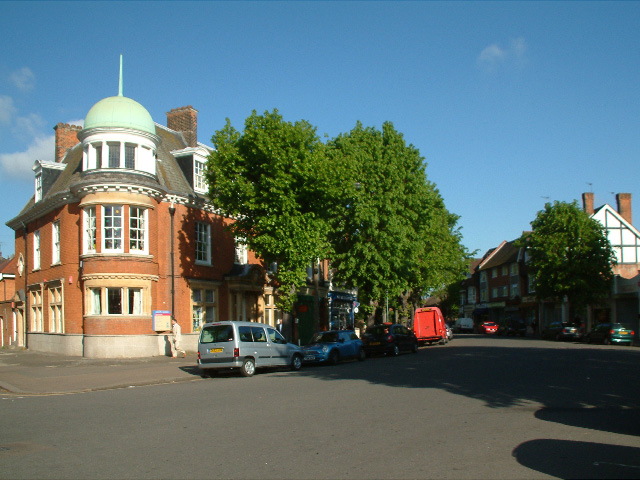
Queen Anne's Parade. In the background is the former bank now the home to a nursery school

Bush Hill Park was farmland that was part of an estate centred on Bush Hill Park House, a country house. The estate changed hands several times in the 18th century before coming under the ownership of William Mellish, a merchant and MP for Middlesex. By this time the estate covered 438 acres (177 ha) – one of the largest in the parish. The estate was broken up in 1875 with the North London Estates Company NLEC, a speculative development company buying 373 acres (151 ha) acres. Bush Hill Park House was sold separately and demolished in 1929.

Initially, the estate was slow to develop. However, with the building of Bush Hill Park station in 1880 the first phase of houses were built between 1880 and 1886. The houses were divided into a prestige development in Village Road and other substantial homes were completed in Wellington Road, Queen Anne's Place and Dryden Road. Most of these earlier houses were designed by architect, R Tayler Smith for the NLEC. By 1887, following a housing boom a ten-year decline began with NLEC going bankrupt in 1887. Demand for housing picked up due to the expansion of the Royal Small Arms Factory during the Boer War and the present form of the estate was completed by 1914. Between 1914 and 1960 development was restricted to infilling existing plots. After 1960 larger properties were demolished and replaced by blocks of flats. In 1987, much of the estate was designated as a conservation area and halted such redevelopment.

On 27 November 1975, Ross McWhirter was murdered by two Provisional IRA terrorists at his home in Village Road in Bush Hill Park.

== Architecture ==
Bush Hill Park Library (later renamed John Jackson Library) has a notable copper-clad roof. It underwent redevelopment in 2019.

The United Reformed Church on Main Avenue was built in 1910. It has a Lombard Romanesque front, round headed windows and a gabled clerestory. The adjacent hall, added in 1932, has an Arts and Crafts feel.

A former bank is adjacent to the southern exit of Bush Hill Park station which has since been repurposed as a nursery, retaining the characteristic dome and pillared entrance of the building.

The aforementioned bank is adjacent to The Old Coach House, a redeveloped coach house with Gothic architecture, such as gargoyles, atop its roofs.

== Governance ==
Bush Hill Park is one of seven wards which form the Edmonton and Winchmore Hill constituency. The three ward councilors elected in May 2018 were Will Coleshill, Jon Daniels and Clare De Silva. This was one gain for the Conservatives, who progressed from two to all three councillors. Enfield Council remains in Labour Control, as it has been since 2010.

In September 2018, William Coleshill was suspended from the Conservatives after being accused of making racist comments. Later the same month, another Conservative councillor for Bush Hill Park, Jon Daniels, resigned. A by-election to replace him was held in November 2018, which was won by the Conservative candidate, James Hockney. Coleshill, who had continued to sit as an independent councillor after being suspended from the Conservative Party, lost his seat in June 2021 after failing to attend council meetings for six months. A by-election to replace him was held in July 2021, which was won by the Conservative Peter Fallart.

The MP for Edmonton and Winchmore Hill is Kate Osamor, Labour Co-op, who polled 25,388 votes (61.4%) at the 2015 United Kingdom general election.

== Geography ==
Bush Hill Park is a popular residential suburb due to its good transport links and wide mix of quality housing. Amenities include two primary schools, several places of worship, a public house, doctor and dentist surgeries and a selection of essential retail outlets and services. Adjacent to the railway station is a parade of shops, and a small commercial area which includes the former bank now used as a nursery.

=== Conservation area ===
The conservation area can be divided into three distinct areas. Firstly, the main core of the estate to include Wellington Road (between Park Avenue and Illingworth Way), Queen Anne's Place, Queen Anne's Gardens, Dryden Road and Abbey Road. The second area, Private Road, was added to the conservation area in 1994. Bush Hill Park railway station and its immediate environs make up the third area. Two buildings of note in this area are the former bank and the Bush Hill Park Hotel, which now serves as a pub.

Contained within the area there is a wide variety of building styles from 1880 to 1960 including examples of Baroque revival, Arts and Crafts and two Grade II listed houses. Open spaces include Bush Hill Park Recreation Ground, the Enfield Cricket Club and Bush Hill Park Tennis and Bowls Club. Also, of interest are the many mature trees, hedges and well-stocked front gardens that can be found throughout the neighbourhood.

=== Watercourses ===
Saddlers Mill Stream flows mostly underground before merging with Salmons Brook. However, the stream is visible at Village Road and Wellington Road.

== Culture ==
The locality has several large areas of open space; The Bush Hill Park Recreation Ground is bounded by Lincoln and Southbury Road and was officially opened on 18 April 1911, Bush Hill Park golf club was established in 1895 on the fringe of Bush Hill Park and extends into Enfield. Enfield Cricket club and the Bush Hill Park Tennis, Bowls and Social Club are both located in the conservation area. The cricket club founded in 1856 plays in the Middlesex County Cricket League while the Bush Hill Park Bowls, Tennis & Social club was founded in its current form in 1912. Riverside Park is an informal public open space off Park Avenue. Croquet was introduced to Bush Hill Park Recreation Ground by Enfield Council in 1991 and the Enfield Croquet Club was founded in 1993.

== Transport ==
Bush Hill Park is served by Bush Hill Park railway station and London bus routes 192 and 377.

== Notable residents ==
- Ross McWhirter, founder of the Guinness Book of Records lived in Village Road until his murder on 27 November 1975.
- Diane Parish, actress who plays Denise Fox in the television programme EastEnders.
- Scorcher, grime MC, as revealed in "Scorcher's Funeral" by Frisco from Logan Sama's War Report mix-tape.
