= Lee Pluck =

English footballer

Personal information
- Date of birth: 25 March 1982 (age 44)
- Place of birth: Enfield, London, England
- Position: Defender

Senior career*
Years	Team	Apps	(Gls)
2000–2003	Barnet	48	(0)
2003–2004	Cambridge City	37	(3)
Total		85	(0)
- * Club domestic league appearances and goals

Lee Pluck (born 25 March 1982) in Enfield, London, is an English retired professional footballer who played as a defender for Barnet in the Football League.
