= Bush Hill Park railway station =

London Overground station

Bush Hill Park
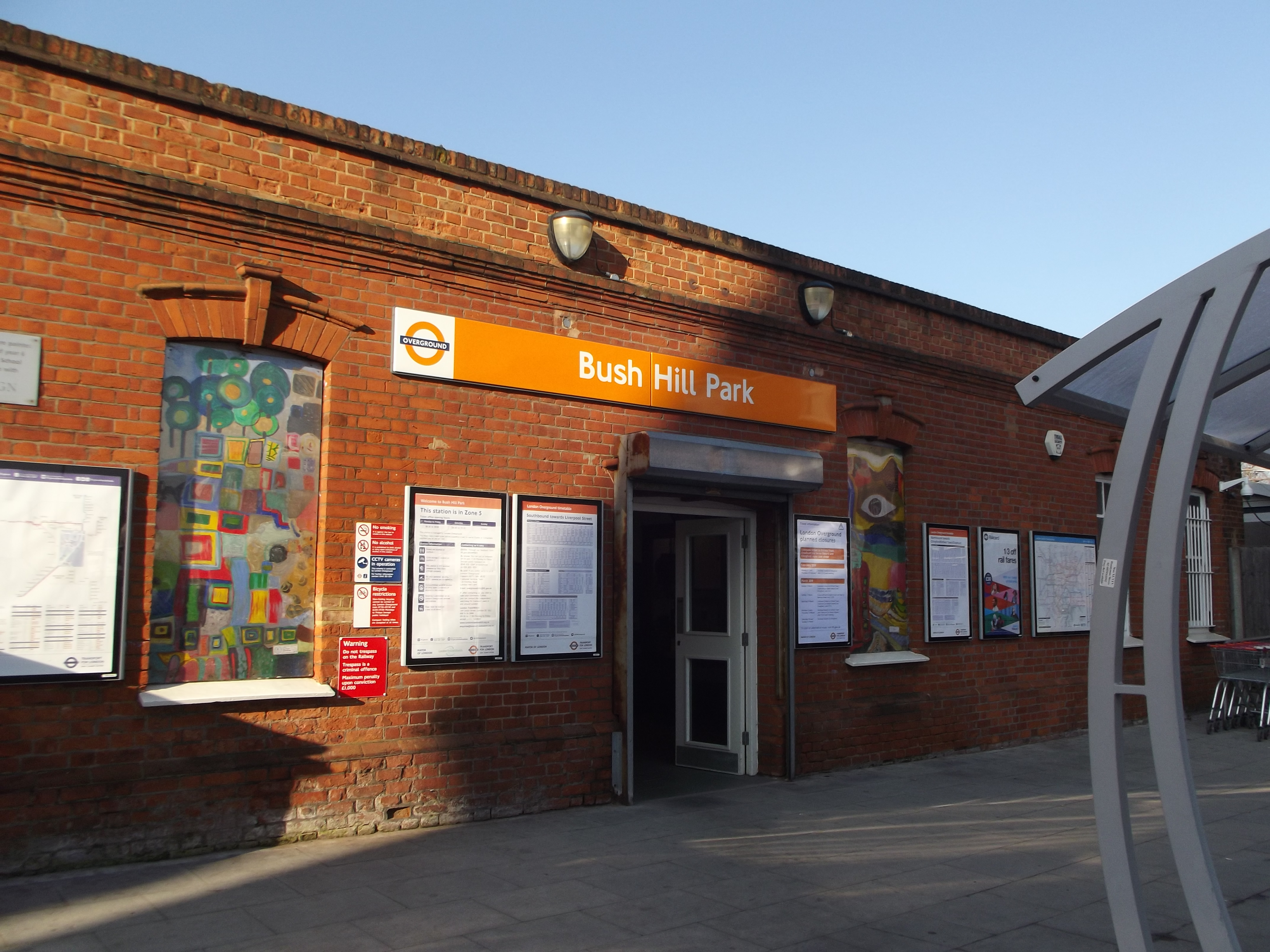
- Bush Hill Park Station
- Interactive map of Bush Hill Park

General information
- Location: Bush Hill Park
- Local authority: London Borough of Enfield
- Managed by: London Overground
- Station code: BHK
- DfT category: D
- Number of platforms: 2
- Accessible: Yes
- Fare zone: 5

National Rail annual entry and exit
- 2020–21: ▼0.283 million
- 2021–22: ▲0.692 million
- 2022–23: ▲0.894 million
- 2023–24: ▲1.144 million
- 2024–25: ▲1.188 million

Other information
- External links: Departures; Facilities
- Coordinates: 51.6418°N 0.0691°W

Bush Hill Park is a station on the Weaver line of the London Overground, serving the neighbourhood of Bush Hill Park in the London Borough of Enfield, north London. It is 9 miles 69 chains (15.9 km) down the line from London Liverpool Street and is situated between Edmonton Green and Enfield Town stations on the Enfield Town branch of the Lea Valley lines. Its three-letter station code is BHK and it is in London fare zone 5.

== History ==
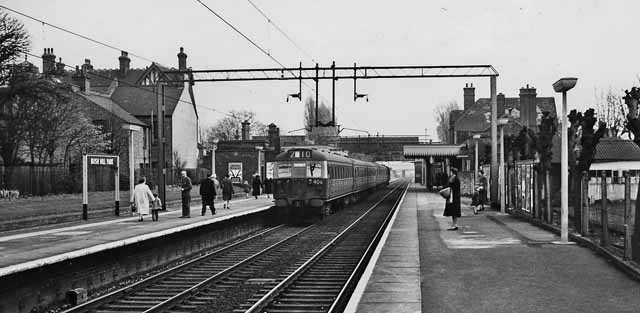
Bush Hill Park, looking south towards central London, in April 1961

The station was opened by the Great Eastern Railway in 1880 following housing development plans arranged by the North London Estates Company. Development in the area expanded after the railway station was opened.

In 2015 the line and Bush Hill Park transferred from Abellio Greater Anglia operation to become part of the London Overground network, and it was added to the Tube map.

== Services ==
All services at Bush Hill Park are operated as part of the Weaver line of the London Overground using Class 710 EMUs.

The typical off-peak service in trains per hour is:

- 2 tph to London Liverpool Street
- 2 tph to Enfield Town

This increases to 4 tph during the weekday peaks.

Preceding station	London Overground	Following station
Edmonton Green towards Liverpool Street	Weaver line Lea Valley lines	Enfield Town Terminus

== Connections ==
London Buses routes 192, 217, 231, 377 and school route 617 serve the station.
