= Angling Times =

British magazine

- Cover of 26 November 2024 issue
- Categories: Sports
- Frequency: Weekly
- Total circulation (June 2016): 25,878
- Company: Bauer Media Group
- Country: United Kingdom
- Language: English
- Website: www.anglingtimes.co.uk

The Angling Times is the UK's largest angling newspaper. It was first printed in 1953.

Angling Times has advice from nationally known names in the sport, such as Steve Ringer, Keith Arthur, John Wilson and Des Taylor.

It is available for IOS and Android.

The related Go Fishing website has instruction on where to fish, videos, and features. The also publish Improve Your Coarse Fishing and UK Carp magazine.
