= Enfield Civic Centre =

Municipal building in London, England

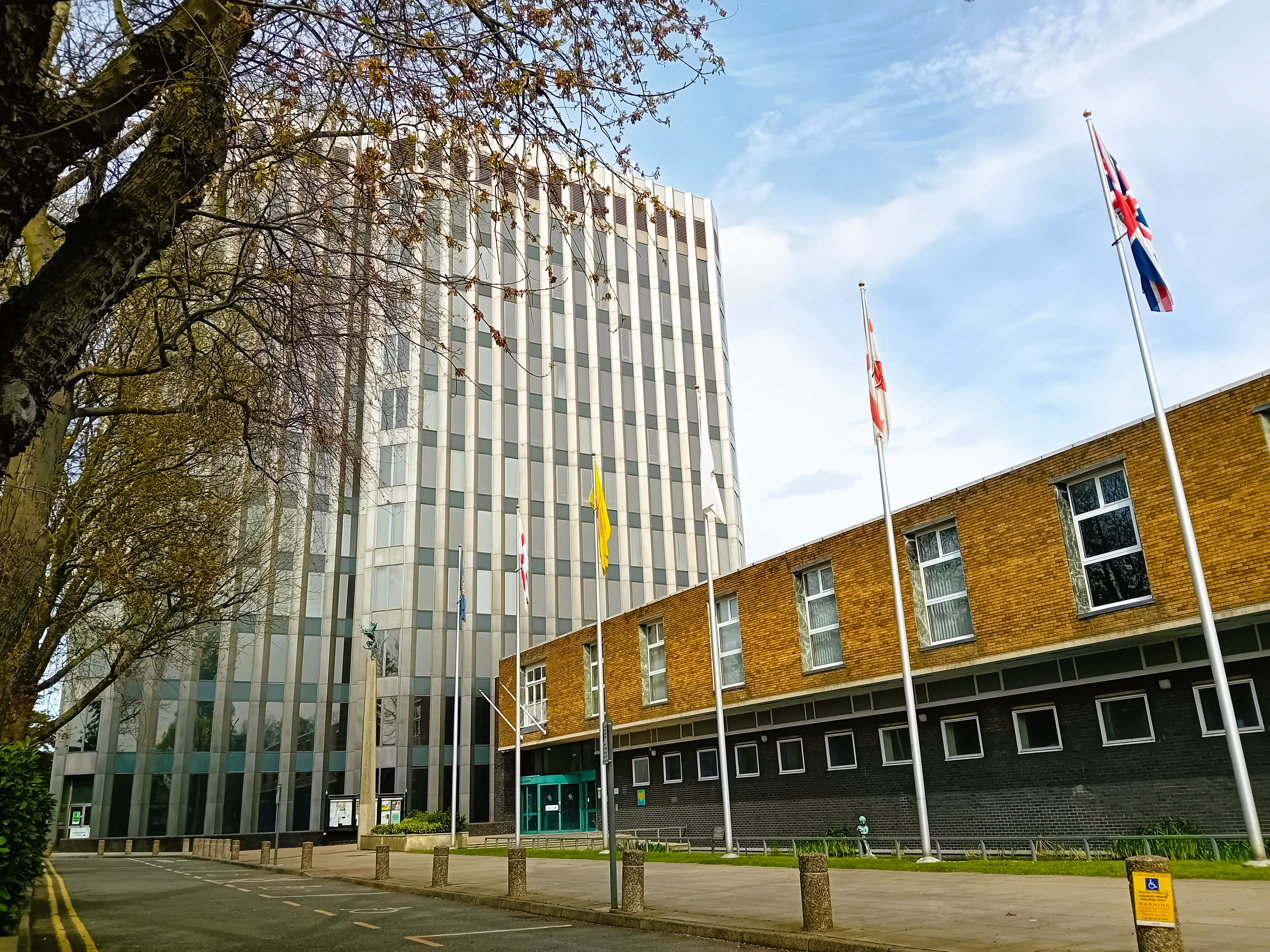
- Enfield Civic Centre

- Shown in Enfield
- 51.6547°N 0.0796°W
- Location: Enfield

History
- Built: 1961

Site notes
- Architect(s): Eric G Broughton & Associates
- Architectural style: Postmodern style

Enfield Civic Centre is a municipal building in Silver Street, Enfield, London. It is the headquarters of Enfield London Borough Council.

== History ==
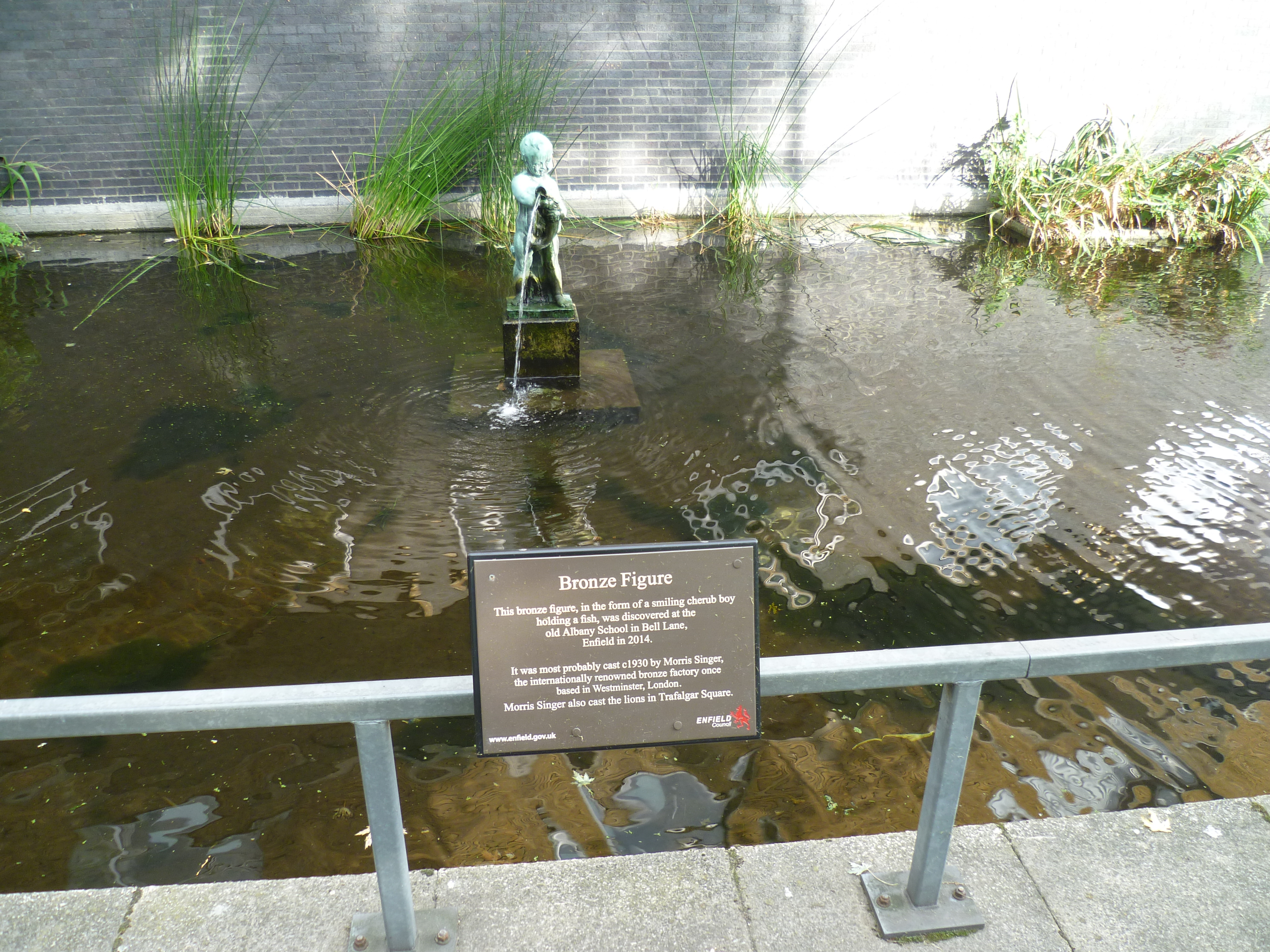
Bronze statue of a smiling cherub holding a fish

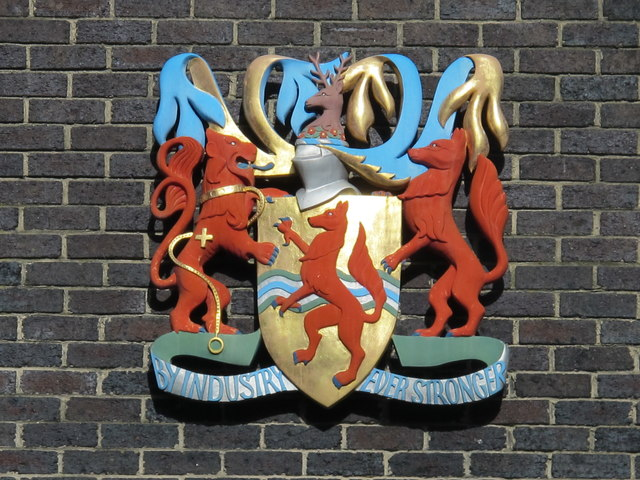
The borough's coat of arms in relief

The civic centre was commissioned to replace the aging former offices of the local board of health in Gentleman's Row. The site selected for the new building, which had previously been occupied by open land, was acquired by the Municipal Borough of Enfield in 1939.

The new building, which was designed by Eric G Broughton & Associates in the postmodern style, was completed in 1961. The design involved an asymmetrical main frontage with nine bays facing onto Silver Street; there were a series of small square windows amidst blue brickwork with a simple revolving door in the bay furthest north on the ground floor; there were nine larger windows amidst brown brickwork with two flagpoles below the window in the bay furthest north on the first floor. The New River formed a decorative feature as it flowed past the front of the building. Internally, the principal room was the council chamber on the first floor. A mural by Gerald Holtom depicting scenes from local history was installed on the staircase and a bronze statue designed by Richard Bentley Claughton depicting the Enfield Beast was erected on top of a tall pillar in front of the entrance.

The civic centre continued to serve as the local of seat of government when the enlarged London Borough of Enfield was formed in 1965. It was substantially expanded by the addition of a 48.5 metres (159 ft) high, twelve-storey stainless steel tower, designed by the same firm of architects, which was erected by Costain Group at the north end of the original structure. A bridge structure, displaying the borough coat of arms, connected the original structure with the extension: the expanded complex was opened by the Queen Mother on 6 May 1975. A plaque was placed on the building to commemorate the occasion.

In December 2014, a bronze statue of a smiling cherub holding a fish, which had been cast at the Singer Art Foundry and had been found abandoned at a local school, was given a new home at the civic centre. An extensive refurbishment of the complex, which included asbestos removal, a change to open plan working and new timber grill ceilings, was completed at a cost of £7 million in 2017.
