= Trinity Church, Enfield =

Church in Enfield, London, England

Coordinates: 51.6529°N 0.0868°W

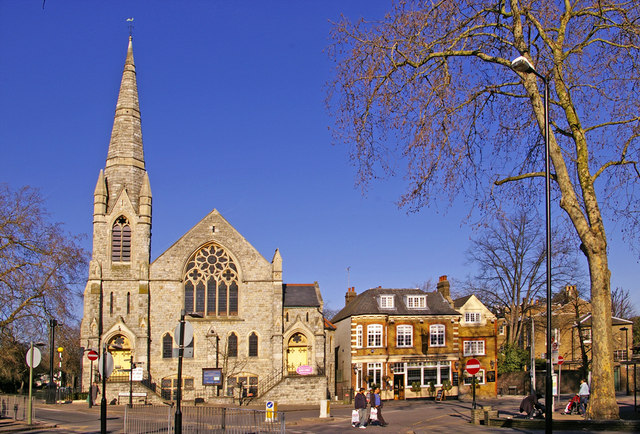
Trinity Church

Trinity Church, Enfield is located at Church Street, Enfield, London. The church was formed in 1983 by the union of Enfield Methodist Church (formed 1890) and St Paul's United Reformed Church (formed 1902).

The Methodist church was built in 1889 to the design of Frederick Boreham on a prominent position at the corner of Church Street and Gentlemen's Row. The building is faced with Kentish ragstone and features a tall spire. It was badly damaged by a fire in 1919, but was restored by the original builders and reopened in the following year. During the Second World War, the basement rooms were used as an Air Raid Precautions control centre. It lies within the Enfield Town Conservation Area, and is a locally listed building.
