= Municipal Borough of Edmonton =

Local government district in Middlesex, England, 1850–1965

Coordinates: 51.62°N 0.07°W

Edmonton
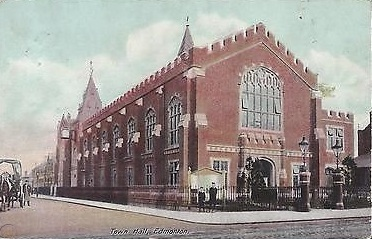
- Edmonton Town Hall c.1908

- Edmonton within Middlesex in 1961
- Area
  - 1894: 3,894 acres (15.8 km^{2})
  - 1965: 3,896 acres (15.8 km^{2})
- Population
  - 1901: 46,899
  - 1961: 91,956
- History
  - Created: 1894
  - Abolished: 1965
  - Succeeded by: London Borough of Enfield
- Status: Local board (1850–1894); Urban district (1894–1937); Municipal borough (from 1937)
- Government
  - HQ: Edmonton
  - Motto: Faith in Industry
- Coat of arms of the borough council

Edmonton was a local government district in north-east Middlesex, England, from 1850 to 1965.

== History ==
Edmonton local board was formed in 1850 for the parish of Edmonton All Saints. In 1881 Southgate was separated from the Edmonton local board's district, gaining its own local board. Edmonton became an urban district in 1894 under the Local Government Act of that year. In 1937 the urban district was granted a charter of incorporation as a municipal borough.

In 1965 the municipal borough was abolished and its area transferred to Greater London, to be combined with that of the Municipal Borough of Southgate and the Municipal Borough of Enfield to form the London Borough of Enfield.

== Town Hall ==
A town hall was built in Fore Street in 1884–5, to house the local board, vestry and magistrates. In brick with stone embellishments, it was in Perpendicular Gothic style with large traceried windows to the public hall on its first floor, which could seat 675. Between 1899 and 1902 the building was extended for the urban district council in the same style, to provide a new council chamber, committee rooms and offices; there was also a separate public swimming baths.

The baths were replaced in 1970 by Edmonton Green swimming pool. The post-1965 borough council, based at Enfield Civic Centre, had no use for the old town hall and it was demolished in 1989.

== Coat of arms ==
The Municipal Borough of Edmonton was granted a coat of arms on 2 October 1937. It was as follows:

Per pale wavy sable and azure on a saltire or between two cogwheels in fess argent an open book proper bound gules edged or.

Crest: On a Wreath or and azure issuant from flames of fire proper a demi-lion per bend sinister sable and or holding in the dexter paw a sledgehammer also proper and resting the sinister paw upon a cinquefoil gules.

Supporters: On either side a lion gules gorged with a collar engrailed with the chain reflexed over the back and charged on the shoulder with a saltire couped or supporting a staff or flying therefrom a banner the dexter azure charged with an oak tree eradicated and fructed proper and the sinister gules charged with two seaxes in saltire argent pomelled and hilted or.

The black and blue background represents the division of the ancient parish of Edmonton, the western portion being the district of Southgate. The saltire (St Alban's Cross) refers to the Abbey of St Albans which held the Manor of Edmonton and the book alludes to the borough's literary associations, especially with Lamb and Keats. The lion is from the arms of the old local family of Francis, while the cinquefoil stands for the family of Charlton, sometime Lords of the Manor. The lion holds a sledgehammer symbolizing the vigour of Edmonton's industries, to which the cogwheels also refer. The flames allude in particular to the gas industry. The supporting lions are taken to typify courage and determination. One banner alludes to the ancient forests of the neighbourhood, and the other contains the seaxes from the arms of the Middlesex County Council. The saltires repeat that on the shield.
