= Christ Church United Reformed Church, Enfield =

Church in Enfield, London, England

Coordinates: 51.65805°N 0.08860°W

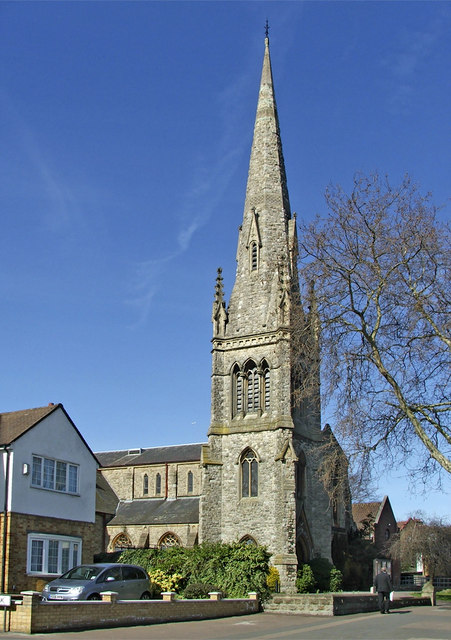
Christ Church United Reformed Church

Christ Church United Reformed Church is a grade II listed United Reformed Church at Chase Side, Enfield, London.
