= Municipal Borough of Southgate =

Local government district

Coordinates: 51.6155°N 0.1106°W

Southgate
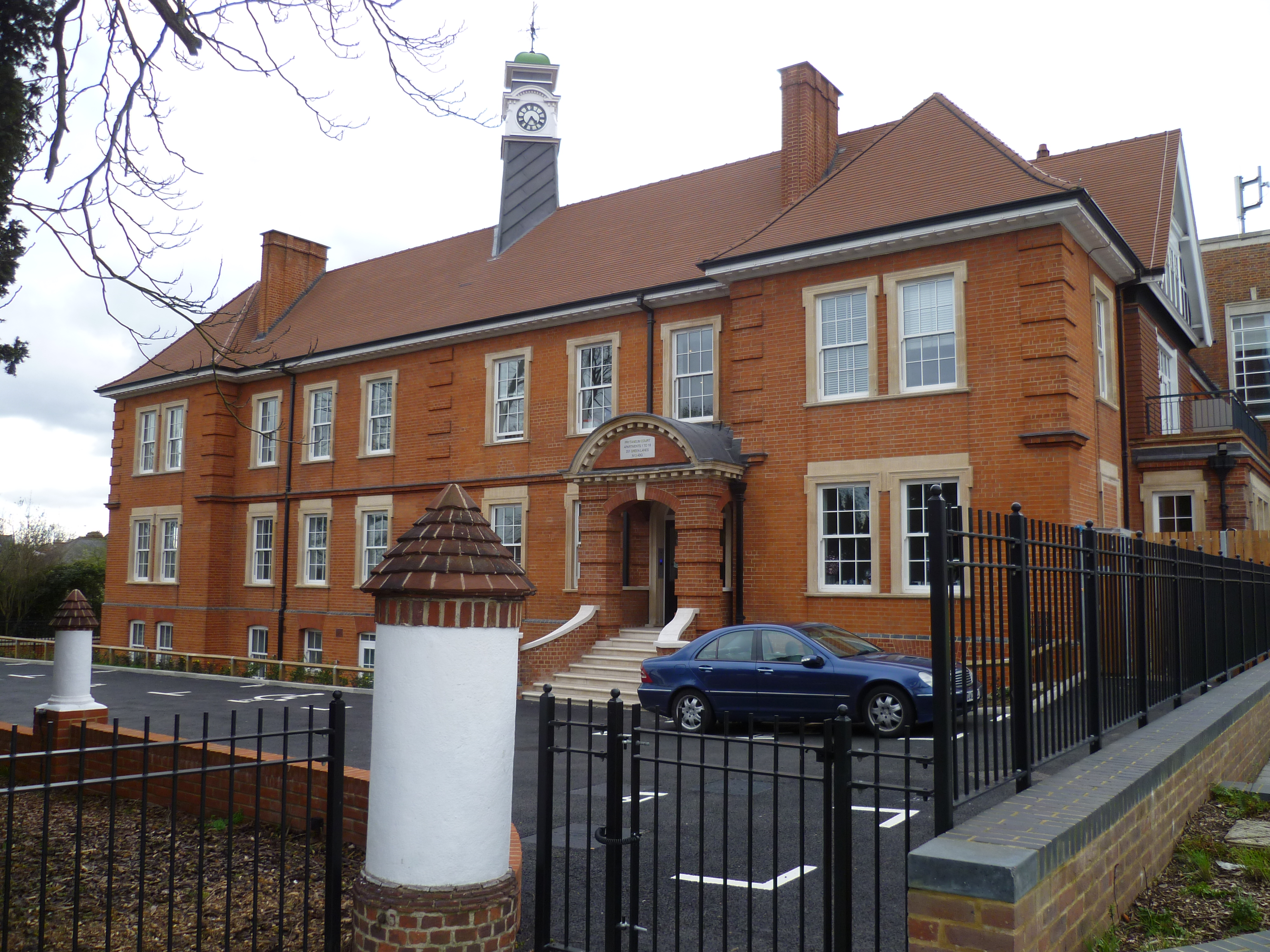
- Southgate Town Hall

- Southgate within Middlesex in 1961
- History
  - Created: 1881
  - Abolished: 1965
  - Succeeded by: London Borough of Enfield
- Status: Local board (1881–1894); Urban district (1894–1933); Municipal borough (1933–1965)
- Government
  - HQ: Southgate Town Hall, Palmers Green
  - Motto: Ex glande, quercus (From the acorn, the oak)
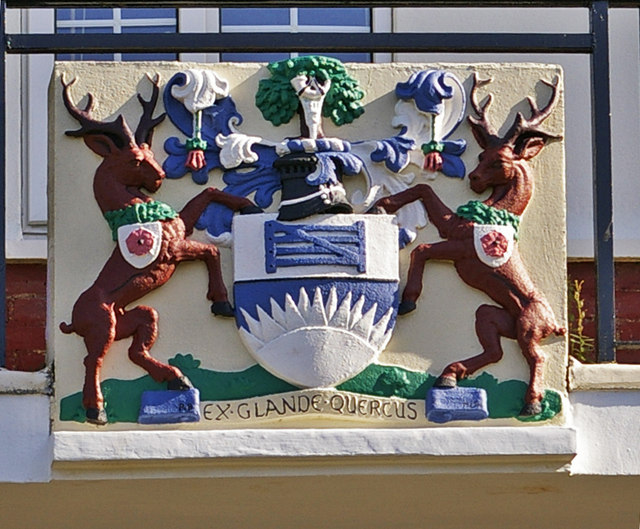
- Coat of arms of the Municipal Borough of Southgate

Southgate was a local government district of Middlesex from 1881 to 1965. It was part of the London postal district and Metropolitan Police District.

A map showing the wards of Southgate Municipal Borough

== Incorporation and development ==
The area was historically part of the parish of Edmonton, which adopted the Public Health Act 1848 (11 & 12 Vict. c. 63) and formed a local board of health to govern the area in 1850. In 1879 the ratepayers of Southgate petitioned for their area to be separated from Edmonton, and in 1881 Southgate Local Board was established, with nine members.

It was created an urban district in 1894, under the Local Government Act 1894. The urban district council was increased in size to 12 councillors in 1900. In 1933 Southgate was granted a charter of incorporation and became a municipal borough. The corporation of the borough consisted of a mayor, seven aldermen and twenty-one councillors.

In 1965, the municipal borough was abolished and its former area transferred to Greater London under the London Government Act 1963. Its former area was combined with that of the Municipal Borough of Enfield and the Municipal Borough of Edmonton to form the present-day London Borough of Enfield.

The borough included Southgate itself as well as neighbouring areas Palmers Green, Winchmore Hill, Arnos Grove, New Southgate, and parts of Oakwood, Cockfosters, Bounds Green and Bowes Park. The borough was administered from Southgate Town Hall, which is situated on Green Lanes in Palmers Green, close to the junction with Broomfield Lane.

== Coat of arms ==
The town was granted a coat of arms on 15 September 1933, when it was incorporated as a municipal borough. The arms was: "Azure issuant from the base a sun in splendour on a chief Or a four-barred gate of the first". The crest was: "On a wreath of the colours an oak tree fructed proper pendent therefrom a bugle-horn and a quiver of arrows Or". The supporters were: "On either side a stag each gorged with a chaplet of oak proper pendent therefrom an escutcheon Or charged with a rose gules". The motto was the Latin for: "From the acorn, the oak."

The arms was canting: the sun was said to represent the south, which, together with the gate, made up the name "Southgate". The oak and stags recalled the former oak forests of the area and the red roses indicated that Southgate was in the Duchy of Lancaster.

The arms can still be seen in relief on the façade of a block of flats in Reservoir Road, near Oakwood tube station.
