= London Borough of Enfield =

- London borough
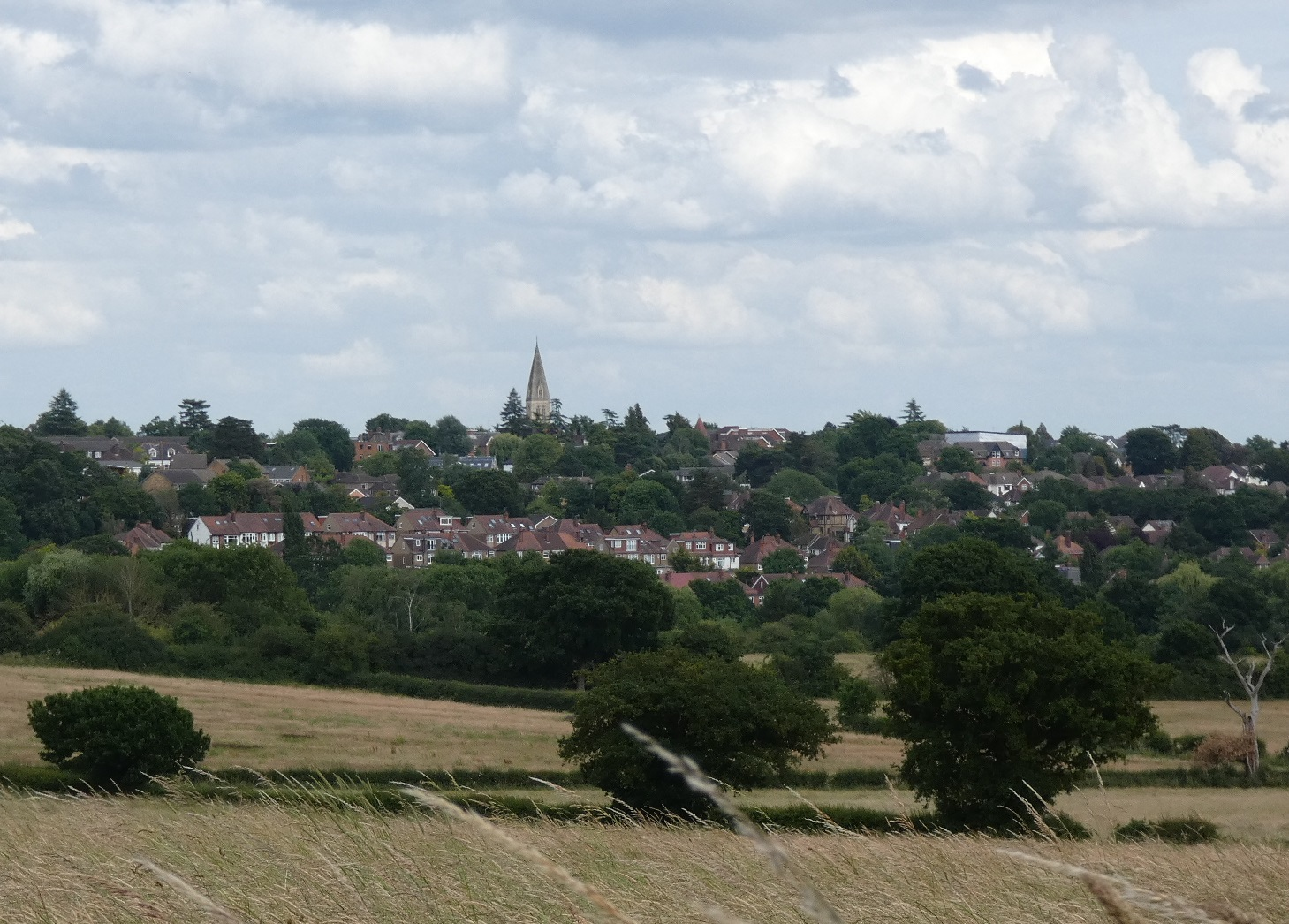
- A view of Enfield from Vicarage Farm

- Coat of arms Council logo
- Motto: By Industry Ever Stronger
- Enfield shown within Greater London
- Coordinates: 51.645°N 0.060°W
- Sovereign state: United Kingdom
- Constituent country: England
- Region: London
- Ceremonial county: Greater London
- Created: 1 April 1965
- Admin HQ: Civic Centre, Enfield Town

Government
  - Type: London borough council
  - Body: Enfield London Borough Council
  - London Assembly: Joanne McCartney AM for Enfield and Haringey
  - MPs: Feryal Clark (Labour); Bambos Charalambous (Labour); Kate Osamor (Labour)

Area
  - Total: 31.74 sq mi (82.20 km^{2})
  - Rank: 213th (of 296)

Population (2025)
  - Total: 329,400
  - Rank: 39th (of 296)
  - Density: 10,380/sq mi (4,007/km^{2})
- Time zone: UTC (GMT)
  - Summer (DST): UTC+1 (BST)
- Postcodes: EN, N,
- Area codes: 01992, 020
- ISO 3166 code: GB-ENF
- ONS code: 00AK
- GSS code: E09000010
- Police: Metropolitan Police
- Website: new.enfield.gov.uk
- The main towns in the borough are Edmonton, Enfield, and Southgate.

The London Borough of Enfield is a London borough in Greater London, England. The main communities in the borough are Edmonton, Enfield, Southgate and Palmers Green. Enfield is an Outer London borough and forms part of North London, being the northernmost borough and bordering Hertfordshire to the north and Essex to the northeast. The local authority is Enfield London Borough Council, based at Enfield Civic Centre. The borough's population is estimated to be 333,794.

It borders the London boroughs of Barnet to the west, Haringey to the south, and Waltham Forest to the southeast. To the north are the districts of Hertsmere, Welwyn Hatfield and Broxbourne (in Hertfordshire), and to the east is Epping Forest District in Essex.

== Etymology ==
Enfield was recorded in Domesday Book in 1086 as Enefelde, and as Einefeld in 1214, Enfeld in 1293, and Enfild in 1564: that is 'open land of a man called Ēana', or 'where lambs are reared', from the Old English feld with an Old English personal name or with Old English ēan 'lamb'. The feld would have been a reference to an area cleared of trees within woodland that would later become known as Enfield Chase.

== History ==
In Roman times, Enfield was connected to Londinium by Ermine Street, the great Roman road which stretched all the way up to York. Artefacts found in the early 1900s reveal that there were Roman settlements in the areas that are now Edmonton and Bush Hill Park.

In 790 King Offa of Mercia was recorded as giving the lands of Edmonton to St Albans Abbey. The area became strategically important as East Anglia was taken over by the Danes. In the 890s strongholds were built by men loyal to King Alfred the Great, in order to keep the Danes to the east of the River Lea.

Following the Norman Conquest, both Enfield and Edmonton were mentioned in Domesday Book. Both had churches, and Enfield had 400 inhabitants, Edmonton 300. Enfield is also described as having a "parc". This parc—a heavily forested area for hunting—was key to Enfield's existence in the Middle Ages (see Enfield Old Park). Wealthy Londoners came to Enfield first to hunt, and then to build houses in the green, wooded surroundings. In 1303, Edward I of England granted Enfield a charter to hold a weekly market, which has continued up to this day. The old market cross was removed in the early 20th century to make way for a monument to the coronation of King Edward VII, but was preserved by the horticulturalist E. A. Bowles for his garden at nearby Myddelton House, where it remains today.

Enfield Grammar School with its Tudor Old Hall stands next to the Enfield Town Market Place and St. Andrew's Church, the school having been extended several times since 1586. A new hall and further additions were completed shortly before World War II.

Nearby historically was the palace of Edward VI, where Elizabeth I lived while a princess, including during the final illness of Henry VIII. Edward was taken there to join her, so that in the company of his sister, Edward Seymour, 1st Earl of Hertford could break the news to Edward, formally announcing the death of their royal father in the presence chamber at Enfield, on his knees to make formal obeisance to the boy as King. Later Elizabeth held court there when she was queen (this was remembered in the name Palace Gardens that was a street running behind Pearsons department store and is still recalled in the name of Enfield's shopping centre).

=== Industry ===
Enfield has a history of armaments manufacture—see Royal Small Arms Factory. The Lee–Enfield .303 rifle was standard issue for the British Army until 1957, although its usage carried on afterwards for some time. Other firearms manufactured there include the Bren and Sten machine guns—the "en" in both cases denoting the place of manufacture.

The world's first solid state circuitry colour televisions were manufactured by Ferguson at their now closed plant in Enfield.

The first mass-produced dishwasher was manufactured in Hotpoint's now closed Enfield plant.

The Barclays Bank branch in Enfield was the first place in the world to have an ATM or cash machine; it was officially opened in June 1967 by Reg Varney, a television actor and personality most famous for his lead role in the comedy series On the Buses. This historical event was marked by a silver plaque on the wall of the bank, and later by an English Heritage Blue plaque.

A fine example of a grade II listed art deco factory building can be found along Southbury Road, with the former Ripaults Factory, now an office building for Travis Perkins.

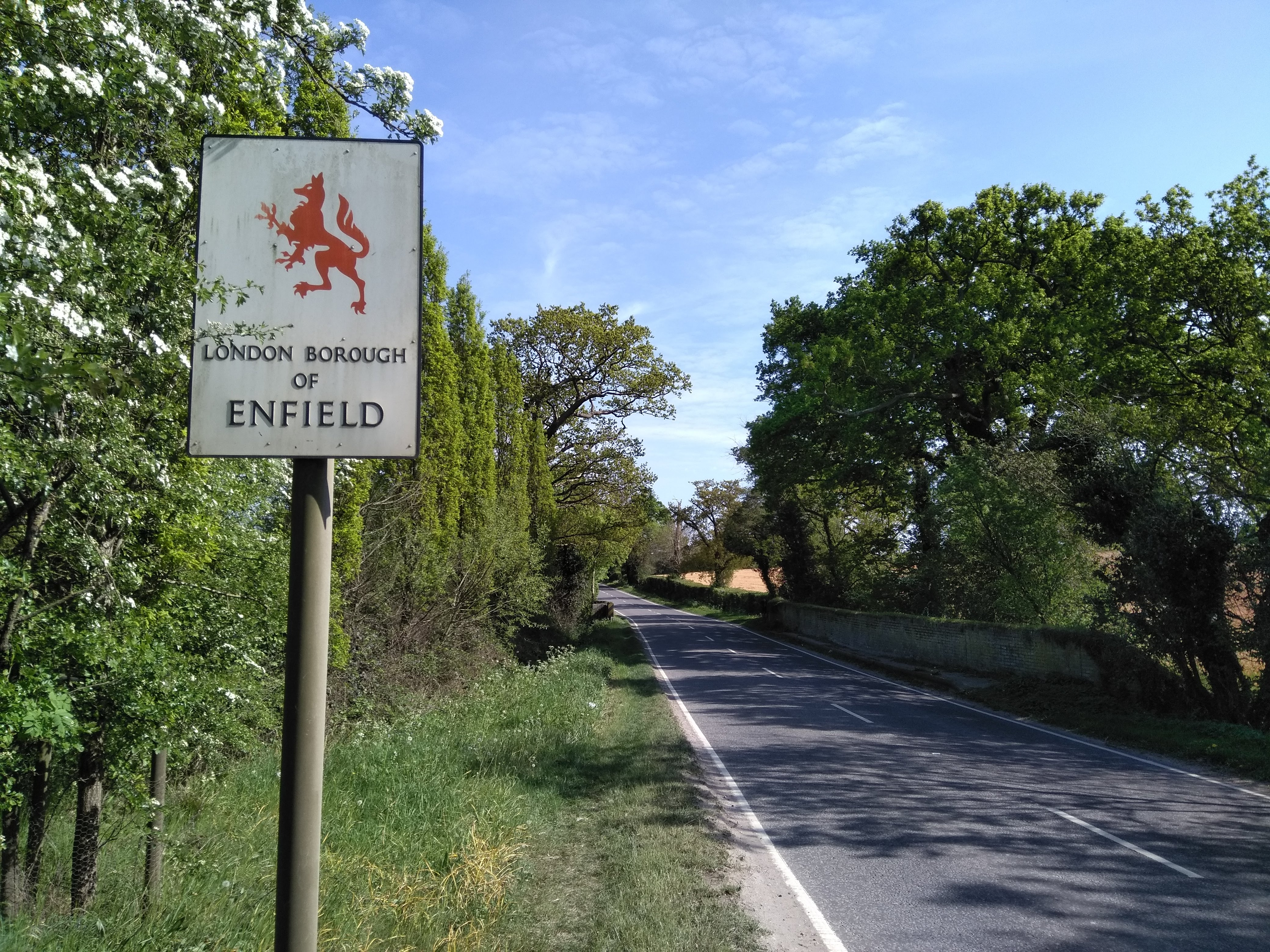
A London Borough of Enfield welcome sign at the border with Hertfordshire

=== Administrative history ===
The area of the modern borough broadly corresponds to the two ancient parishes of Enfield and Edmonton, and was historically part of the county of Middlesex. Both parishes were made local board districts in 1850, each with an elected board overseeing public health and responsible for the provision of infrastructure. The Edmonton district was divided in 1881, when its western part was made a separate district called Southgate. Such districts were reconstituted as urban districts under the Local Government Act 1894.

Each of the three urban districts was later raised to the status of a municipal borough: Southgate in 1933, Edmonton in 1937, and Enfield in 1955.

The modern borough was created in 1965 under the London Government Act 1963, covering the combined area of the former boroughs of Enfield, Edmonton and Southgate, which were all abolished at the same time. The area was transferred from Middlesex to Greater London to become one of the 32 London Boroughs.

The armorial bearings of these three boroughs were also merged. The heraldic beast on the shield of the Enfield coat of arms is known in heraldry as an "Enfield" (or colloquially as the Enfield beast), and is used extensively as a logo representing Enfield, particularly by the borough council.

== Enfield today ==
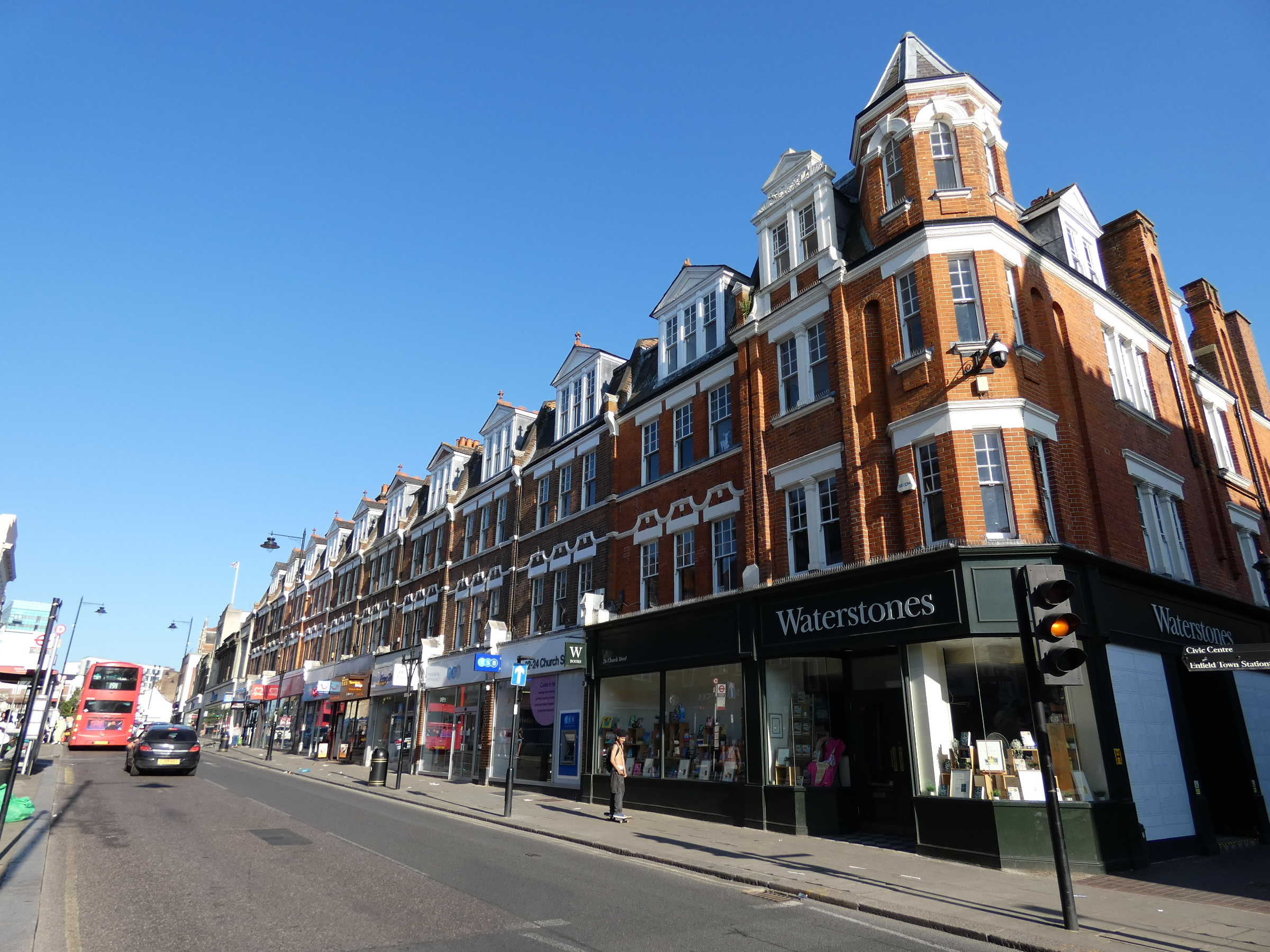
Church Street in Enfield Town

The borough's Civic Centre is in Silver Street, Enfield Town, and is home to the council. Enfield Town is also home to the local credit union, North London Credit Union.

In 2007, Enfield Town centre completed a major redevelopment project under the name PalaceXchange while retaining the Palace Gardens Shopping Centre. An extension was added to the existing retail area with many new shops, and a second multi-storey car park was built along with a new road layout.

A major redevelopment of Edmonton Green including the shopping centre, and adjacent municipal housing over a wide area, started in 1999. This is still on-going, and provides new housing, health facilities, a new leisure centre, a supermarket, and many other civic features.

Many local activities are located around the A10 road, on the sites of former industrial enterprises, which has a number of large retail outlets and a large multiplex Cineworld cinema. The cinema also hosts Jubilee Church on a Sunday morning; whilst cinemagoers continue to watch films in the other screens, a charismatic church which draws its worshippers from a wide area.

The western part of Enfield is largely residential, with shopping centres in Southgate, Palmers Green and Cockfosters.

Parts of Enfield experienced rioting in August 2011, in which a private car and a van were set alight and completely destroyed, a police car vandalised (smashed windows) and a number of shops in Enfield Town Centre as well as others in the Enfield Retail Park being broken into and looted. The Sony Distribution Centre in the Innova Business Park, near Waltham Cross, was burnt to the ground. In September 2012, a year after the attack, a rebuilt Sony Distribution Centre was opened by the prime minister, David Cameron.

== Governance ==
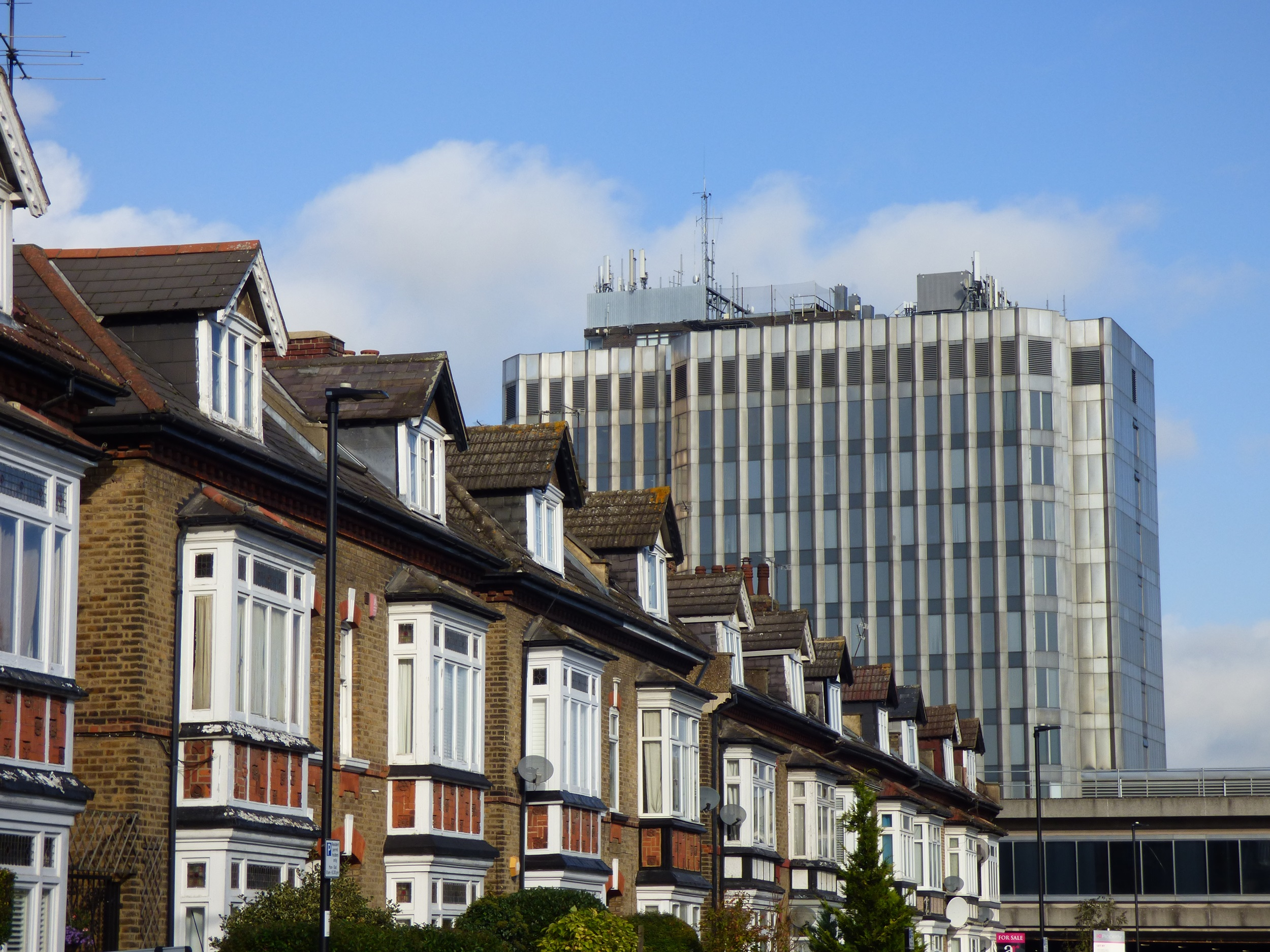
Enfield Civic Centre seen from St Andrew's Road

The local authority is Enfield Council, based at the Civic Centre on Silver Street in Enfield. The council has been controlled by a Labour Party majority since 2010.

=== Greater London representation ===
Since 2000, for elections to the London Assembly, the borough forms part of the Enfield and Haringey constituency.

=== Members of parliament ===
The borough has three members of parliament (MPs) representing Enfield North, Edmonton and Winchmore Hill and Southgate and Wood Green constituencies. The latter is a cross-borough constituency with neighbouring Haringey.

== Demographics ==
Population
Year	Pop.	±%
1801	10,789	—
1811	13,249	+22.8%
1821	15,876	+19.8%
1831	16,745	+5.5%
1841	18,111	+8.2%
1851	18,854	+4.1%
1861	26,819	+42.2%
1871	34,784	+29.7%
1881	42,750	+22.9%
1891	68,557	+60.4%
1901	103,049	+50.3%
1911	154,907	+50.3%
1921	177,309	+14.5%
1931	202,969	+14.5%
1941	243,489	+20.0%
1951	292,100	+20.0%
1961	279,907	−4.2%
1971	268,239	−4.2%
1981	257,169	−4.1%
1991	263,096	+2.3%
2001	273,563	+4.0%
2011	312,466	+14.2%
2021	329,601	+5.5%
2024 estimate	327,434	−0.7%
Source: A Vision of Britain through time, citing Census population 2024 estimate

Population pyramid of Enfield in 2021

Ethnic makeup of Enfield by single year ages in 2021

Religion in London Borough of Enfield (2021)
1. Christianity (46.4%)
2. Islam (18.6%)
3. Hinduism (3.10%)
4. Other religions (5.10%)
5. Non-religious (19.8%)
6. Not Stated (7.00%)

Ethnic Group	Year											
Ethnic Group	1971 estimations		1981 estimations		1991 census		2001 census		2011 census		2021 census	
Ethnic Group	Number	%	Number	%	Number	%	Number	%	Number	%	Number	%
White: Total	–	94.6%	243,578	92.1%	225,590	85.7%	210,949	77.1%	190,640	61.0%	171,884	52.1%
White: British	–	–	–	–	–	–	167,394	61.2%	126,450	40.5%	103,140	31.3%
White: Irish	–	–	–	–	–	–	8,398	3.1%	6,899	2.2%	5,969	1.8%
White: Gypsy or Irish Traveller	–	–	–	–	–	–	–	–	344	0.1%	374	0.1%
White: Roma	–	–	–	–	–	–	–	–	–	–	1,121	0.3%
White: Other	–	–	–	–	–	–	35,157	12.8%	56,947	18.2%	61,280	18.6%
Asian or Asian British: Total	–	–	8,923	3.4%	17,428	6.6%	23,260	8.5%	34,893	11.1%	40,058	11.5%
Asian or Asian British: Indian	–	–	5,244	2%	9,390		10,887	4.0%	11,648	3.7%	11,870	3.6%
Asian or Asian British: Pakistani	–	–	638		1,083		1,717	0.6%	2,594	0.8%	3,674	1.1%
Asian or Asian British: Bangladeshi	–	–	981		2,194		3,524	1.3%	5,599	1.8%	8,123	2.5%
Asian or Asian British: Chinese	–	–	696		1,179		2,011	0.7%	2,588	0.8%	2,691	0.8%
Asian or Asian British: Other Asian	–	–	1,364		3,582		5,121	1.9%	12,464	4.0%	11,615	3.5%
Black or Black British: Total	–	–	9,778	3.7%	16,488	6.3%	28,591	10.4%	53,687	17.1%	60,512	18.2%
Black or Black British: African	–	–	2,280		4,281		11,884	4.3%	28,222	9.0%	36,463	11.0%
Black or Black British: Caribbean	–	–	5,854	2.2%	9,730	3.7%	14,590	5.3%	17,334	5.5%	16,990	5.1%
Black or Black British: Other Black	–	–	1,644		2,477		2,117	0.8%	8,131	2.6%	7,059	2.1%
Mixed or British Mixed: Total	–	–	–	–	–	–	9,089	3.0%	17,183	5.5%	19,558	6%
Mixed: White and Black Caribbean	–	–	–	–	–	–	2,303	1.0%	4,852	1.6%	5,165	1.6%
Mixed: White and Black African	–	–	–	–	–	–	1,316	0.4%	2,384	0.8%	2,994	0.9%
Mixed: White and Asian	–	–	–	–	–	–	1,911	0.8%	4,189	1.3%	3,818	1.2%
Mixed: Other Mixed	–	–	–	–	–	–	3,559	0.8%	5,758	1.8%	7,581	2.3%
Other: Total	–	–	2,143		3,693		4,595	0.9%	16,063	5.3%	40,058	12.2%
Other: Arab	–	–	–	–	–	–	–	–	1,930	0.7%	2,535	0.8%
Other: Any other ethnic group	–	–	–	–	–	–	4,595	0.9%	14,133	4.6%	37,523	11.4%
Ethnic minority: Total	–	5.4%	20,844	7.9%	37,609	14.3%	65,535	22.9%	121,826	39.0%	160,186	47.9%
Total	–	100%	264,422	100%	263,199	100%	276,484	100.00%	312,466	100.00%	329,985	100%

=== Immigration ===
This list includes top-15 sources of immigration to Borough of Enfield for 2021 census:

#	Country	Number
1	Turkiye	17,053
2	Cyprus	9,972
3	Bulgaria	8,264
4	Romania	6,812
5	Poland	5,894
6	Albania	4,921
7	Ghana	4,738
8	Jamaica	4,072
9	Nigeria	3,861
10	Somalia	3,807
11	India	3,730
12	Bangladesh	3,537
13	Ireland	3,283
14	Italy	3,167
15	Mauritius	2,839

== Public services ==
=== Health ===
Two major NHS hospitals, Chase Farm Hospital operated by the Royal Free London NHS Foundation Trust and North Middlesex Hospital operated by the North Middlesex University Hospital NHS Trust, are located in the borough. NHS Enfield Clinical Commissioning Group is responsible for local primary health care, taking over this role from Enfield Primary Care NHS Trust in 2013. Former hospitals in the borough include Highlands, which closed in 1993, and Greentrees, which closed in 1988.

=== Education ===
==== Schools ====
The London Borough of Enfield is the education authority for the district. Education is provided in a mix of community, voluntary aided and state schools. A number of private schools are also located in the borough.

The borough is home to the well-renowned Enfield Grammar School, founded in 1558, which still uses its Tudor building which is now often referred to as the Old Hall. Enfield Grammar School is based in the centre of Enfield Town. St Ignatius' College is the borough's largest Catholic school and one of the best-performing non-selective schools in the borough, at both GCSE and A-Level. Bishop Stopford's School is Enfield's largest school, and The College of Haringey, Enfield and North East London also has a campus in the borough.

In 2007 a new school named Oasis Academy Enfield was opened, following the takeover of Albany by the Oasis Company as Oasis Academy Hadley. The Latymer School is another Grammar school in the borough, and is based in the Edmonton area.

Enfield County School is an all girls comprehensive school which sits opposite Enfield Grammar Boys school in Enfield town.

==== University ====
Middlesex University, the former polytechnic, used to have two campuses in Enfield: Cat Hill and Trent Park. These sites both closed in 2011 and courses were relocated to the Hendon campus.

Oak Hill Theological College, an associate college of Middlesex University, is located in the borough.

Capel Manor College also offers various courses.

=== London Fire Brigade ===
The London Borough of Enfield has three fire stations; Edmonton, Enfield and Southgate. However, if an incident requires a higher attendance, appliances from throughout London can be mobilised to meet the needs of the area if required.

The three fire stations operate a total of five pumping appliances, one rescue tender, a command unit and a USAR unit.

Of the three fire stations within the borough, Enfield is mobilised to the most incidents and has the largest station ground (the area of which Enfield is the first appliance to attend).

=== Museums ===
The borough's museums include Forty Hall and the garden exhibitions at Capel Manor, Myddleton House (part of the Lee Valley Park) and the Whitewebbs Museum of Transport.

The Borough's own museum is based in Thomas Hardy House, 39 London Road.

=== Youth activities ===
There are 15 scout groups in Enfield.

== Media ==
Enfield Dispatch and Enfield Independent provide local news.

== Sport and recreation ==
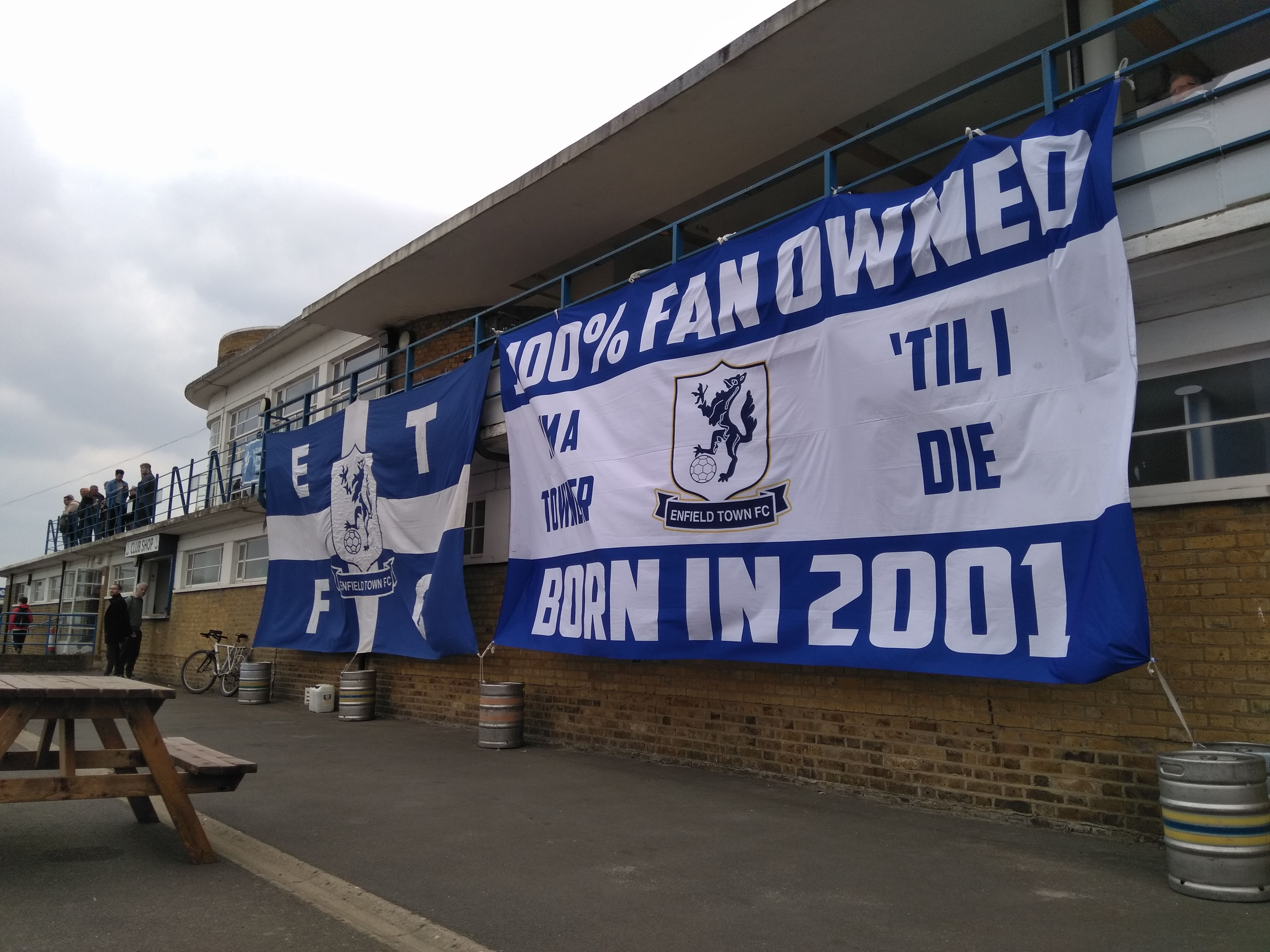
QE2 Stadium, home to the country's first fan-owned football club, Enfield Town FC

Enfield's King George's Field, named in memory of King George V, includes the Queen Elizabeth II athletics stadium, the Enfield Ignatians Rugby Club and numerous football, rugby and baseball diamonds. The playing fields were used as a POW camp for Italians during World War II.

The second largest playing fields are at Firs Farm on Firs Lane. There are a handful of rugby pitches along with more than a dozen football pitches. These are used by local amateur football clubs including Winchmore Hill Football Club.

Many sports teams and clubs are located in Enfield; Winchmore Hill Sports Club, Winchmore Hill Football Club, Enfield Town F.C., Enfield 1893 F.C., Cockfosters F.C., Enfield Borough F.C. and Futsal Club Enfield are the most prominent. The once successful football club, Enfield FC, were forced into a nomadic existence after the sale of their Southbury Road ground and became defunct at the end of the 2006/2007 season after years of ground sharing at many Hertfordshire based clubs. Enfield 1893 were formed after Enfield FC's demise and have spent time groundsharing at Ware FC and Broxbourne Borough FC. They finally found a ground in the borough when they merged with Brimsdown Rovers for the start of the 2011/2012 season.

The principal cricket clubs in the area are Enfield, Winchmore Hill Cricket Club, Edmonton and Southgate, with many others playing cricket in and around the borough such as, Enfield Invicta, Mayfield CC, Myddleton House, North Enfield CC, Botany Bay and Holtwhites Trinibis CC. Many clubs play in either the Middlesex Cricket League or the Hertfordshire League. Enfield, Southgate, and Winchmore Hill have long been the area's most successful cricket clubs, regularly competing in the Middlesex Premier League. Enfield (in 1988) and Southgate (in 1977) are both past winners of the ECB National Club Cricket Championship.

Gaelic Football is also played in the area.

Enfield Phoenix is the local basketball club with teams playing in the National League and the Central London League.

Theatre goers are catered for by the Intimate Theatre, the Millfield Theatre, the Dugdale Centre and the Chickenshed Theatre Company, with amateur and professional shows, dance pieces, musicals and live music on show. Amateur dramatic companies include Saint Monica's Players, The Capel Players and The London Pantomimers. Talkies Community Cinema screens British Independent and specialist films in a range of venues across the borough.

Tottenham Hotspur Football Club's new training ground is located in Enfield at Bulls Cross.

Enfield is the home to the annual Livestock Music Festival.

Croquet is played at Enfield Croquet Club in Bush Hill Park.

The first international branch of the WWE Performance Center was opened in Enfield's Great Cambridge Industrial Estate on 11 January 2019. The center is used by the WWE as a professional wrestling school to train potential future wrestlers from across the globe, as well as a training centre for current WWE wrestlers.

== Transport ==
In 1840 the first section of the Northern and Eastern Railway was opened from Stratford to Broxbourne, with stations at Water Lane (Angel Road) and Ponders End. Further stations were added in 1855 at Enfield Lock (Royal Small Arms Factory) and 1884 at Brimsdown. A branch line from Water Lane to Enfield Town was opened in 1849 serving Edmonton Low Level and Enfield Town. A further station was added in 1880 at Bush Hill Park. The direct line from London to Enfield Town was opened in 1872 with stations at Silver Street and Lower Edmonton (now called Edmonton Green). In 1891, a loop from Edmonton serving Southbury (Churchbury) and Turkey Street (Forty Hill) to Cheshunt on the main line was added. The Cheshunt and Enfield Town services are currently served by London Overground.

In 1871 the Great Northern Railway opened its station on Windmill Hill. This was later replaced in 1910 when the line was extended to Cuffley. This section of railway is now part of the line commonly known as the Hertford Loop.

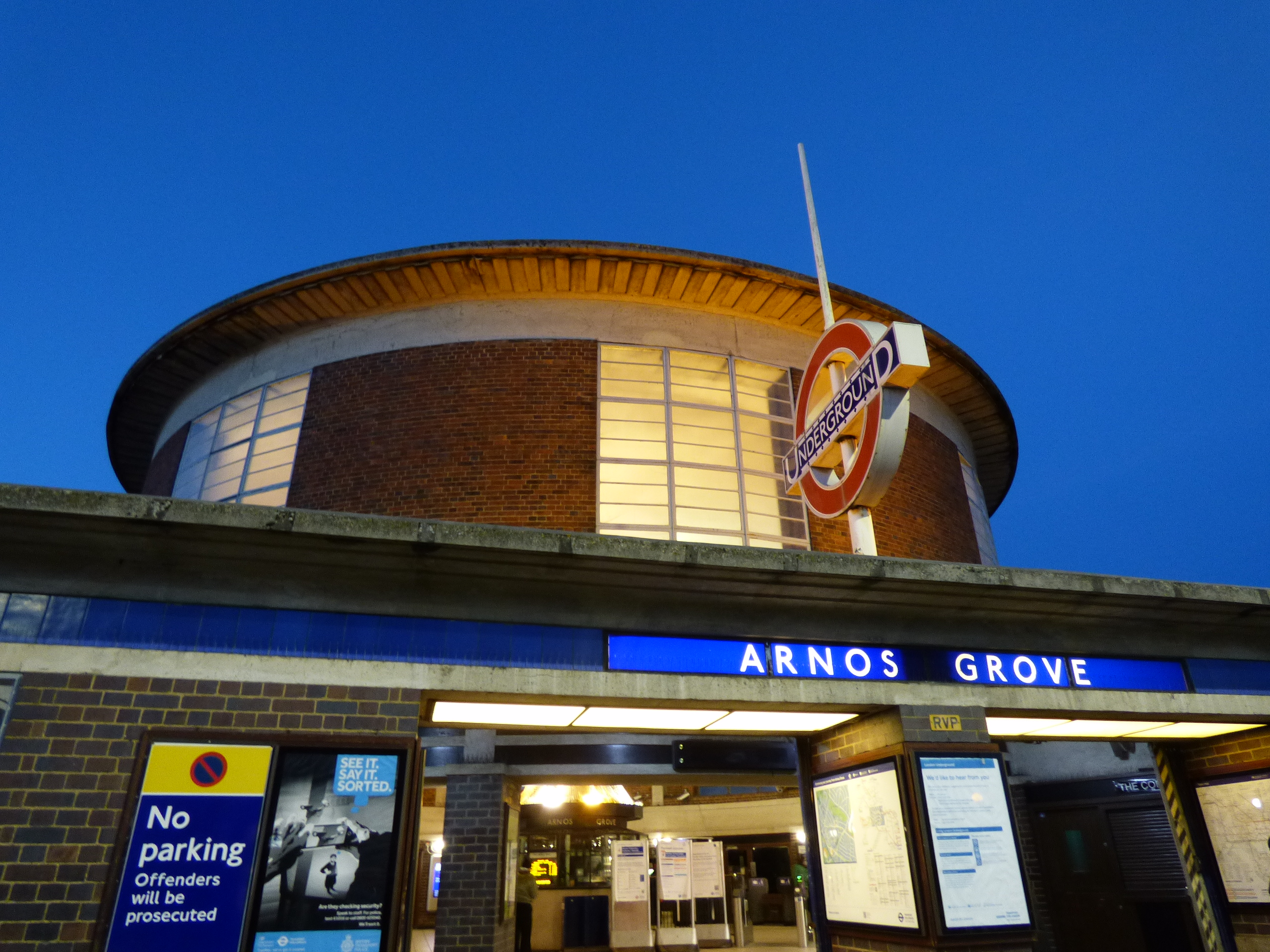
Arnos Grove station on the Piccadilly line

Enfield is served by the Piccadilly line of the London Underground with stations at Arnos Grove, Southgate, Oakwood (named as Enfield West when it first opened) and Cockfosters (where the line terminates). Suburban London Overground and National Rail Great Northern services also run within the borough.

There are numerous bus services throughout the borough run by Transport for London.

The main roads running through the borough include the North Circular Road, the M25, Green Lanes, the A10 and the old Hertford Road (A1010).

In March 2011, the main forms of transport that residents used to travel to work were: driving a car or van, 26.1% of all residents aged 16–74; underground, metro, light rail, tram, 8.2%; bus, minibus or coach, 8.2%; train, 7.3%; on foot, 4.0%; work mainly at or from home, 2.7%; passenger in a car or van, 1.6%.

== Town twinning ==
Enfield is twinned with:

- Courbevoie, Hauts-de-Seine, Île-de-France, France
- Gladbeck, North Rhine-Westphalia, Germany
- Halandri, Greece
- Sarıyer, Turkey
- Schwechat, Lower Austria, Austria
- Wandlitz, Brandenburg, Germany
- Freudenstadt, Baden-Württemberg, Germany

== See also ==
- Enfield parks and open spaces
- List of churches in the London Borough of Enfield
- List of districts in Enfield
- List of people from Enfield
