= Arthur Hiscoe =

English architect (1848–1912)

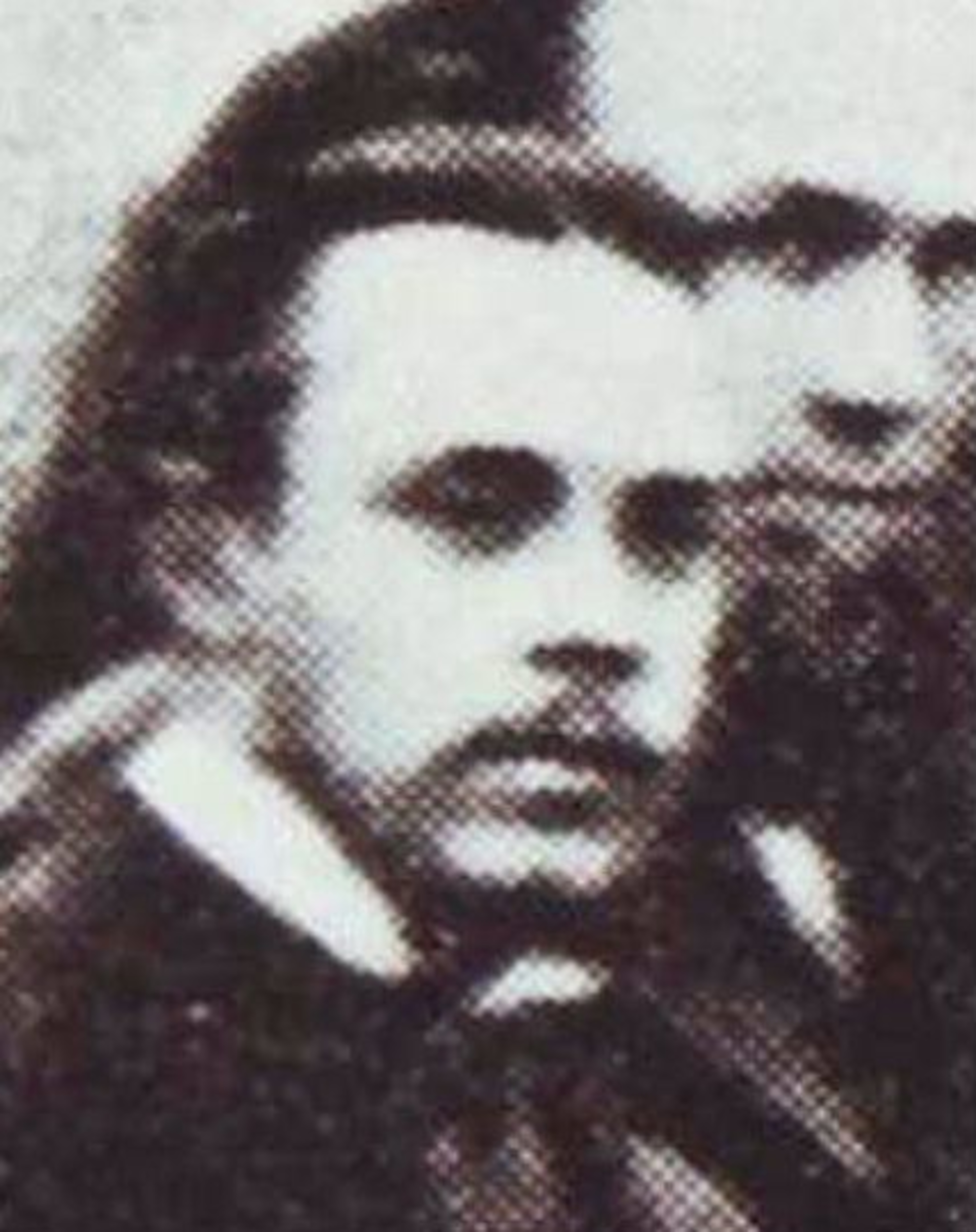
- Hiscoe in 1874
- Born: Arthur Hiscox; 17 June 1848; Leeds, West Riding of Yorkshire
- Died: 22 November 1912 (aged 64); Beeston Hill, Leeds
- Cause of death: Alcohol poisoning
- Resting place: Holbeck Cemetery, Leeds
- Occupations: Architect; photographer
- Years active: 1870–1912
- Children: 14
- Buildings: In Harrogate: Former Primitive Methodist Chapel, (now Cardomom Black); Former Station Hotel (now Zizzi); Former Public Market; Former St James' Hall; Façade and interior of the Former Promenade Rooms, Harrogate

Signature
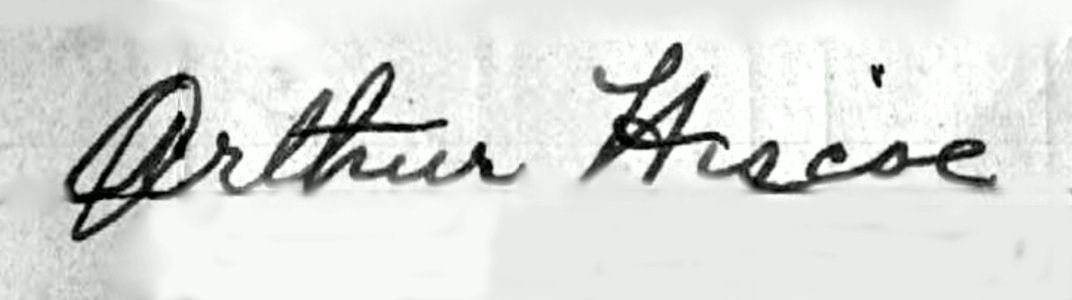

Arthur Hiscoe (born Arthur Hiscox; 17 June 1848 – 22 November 1912) was an English architect based in Leeds, who created his most noted works in Harrogate in the West Riding of Yorkshire. He was described by historian Malcolm Neesam as one of the "most eminent local architects" of Harrogate, where he created some major buildings. Most of his public buildings have been destroyed or suffered change of use, although his villas survive in the suburbs of the town. He remodelled the Promenade Room, which later became the Mercer Art Gallery in Harrogate. It is now a Grade II listed building.

The height of Hiscoe's career was in the 1870s and 1880s when he produced religious and civic buildings in Harrogate, including the former Primitive Methodist Chapel (uninhabited as of 2026) in Mount Parade, the former Wesleyan Day and Sunday Schools (now Jinnah restaurant), the Station Hotel in Station Parade (now Zizzi restaurant), and the former St James' Hall building (since demolished) in Station Parade, where the Victoria Shopping Centre now stands. His greatest public moment was 28 February 1874 when the foundation stone of Harrogate's former Public Market, or Old Market Buildings, was laid by the chairman of the Harrogate Improvement Commissioners (HIC). On that day, as the celebrated architect of the building, he took part in the civic procession which marched from Harrogate Town Hall to the market site, was photographed alongside Harrogate's great men of the day, presented the chairman with the traditional silver trowel for the laying of the foundation stone, and was invited to the HIC celebration dinner afterwards.

In the 1890s, after experiencing a shortage of commissions, Hiscoe suffered two bankruptcies, and moved house many times, mostly in Leeds. He was imprisoned for seven days at HM Prison Wakefield for drunkenness in 1906. He continued to work until 1912 when he died of alcohol poisoning at home in the presence of his family, after being carried home by friends.

== Background ==
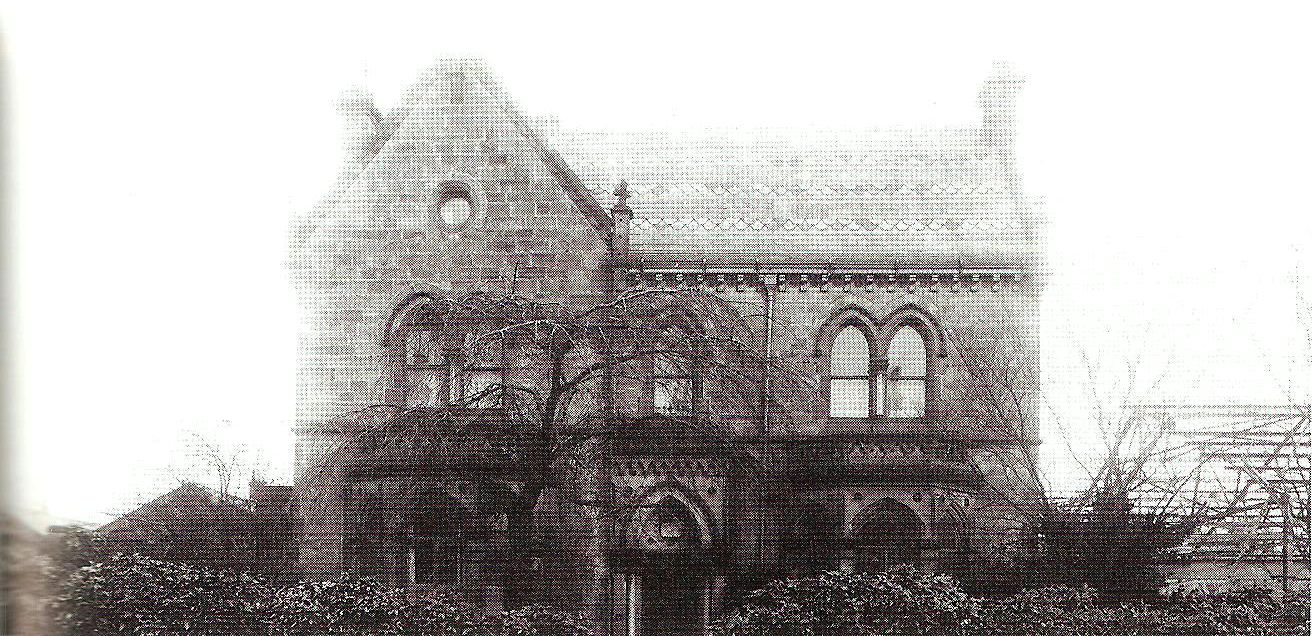
Holyrood House, before 1914

Hiscoe's father and siblings used the surname "Hiscox", and Hiscoe himself used the name, "Hiscox", at least until his marriage. Most of his children were registered with the name, "Hiscox". However he used the name, "Hiscoe", professionally and he and his wife were using that name in later life. Hiscoe's father was cloth finisher and property owner John Hiscox. (Note: John Hiscox (Frome c.1816 – Knaresborough 17 January 1875), a cloth finisher or dresser. GRO index: Deaths Mar 1875 Hiscox John 59 Knaresbro' 9a 94.) Between at least 1869 and his death in January 1875, John Hiscox owned Holyrood House, "a commodious, handsome residence" in Harrogate. He also erected and ran the former Station Hotel, Harrogate in 1873, and owned other plots of land. Hiscoe's mother was Elizabeth Hudson. They were married on 22 December 1834 at St Peter's Church, Leeds, and had eight children, of whom Arthur Hiscox was the fifth, and the younger of two sons. (Note: Elizabeth Hudson (Leeds 1813 – Middlesex 27 July 1883).)

Hiscoe was born on 17 June 1848 at Low Barr, Whitehall Road, Wortley, Leeds. His mother, as the informant on his birth certificate, signed with an "X", revealing her illiteracy at that time. Hiscoe was baptised on 16 July 1848 at St John the Evangelist Church in Wortley. (Note: Arthur Hiscoe or Hiscox (Wortley, Leeds 17 June 1848 – Holbeck 22 November 1912). GRO index: Births Sep 1848 Hiscox Arthur Hunslet XXIII 347. Deaths Dec 1912 Hiscoe Arthur 64 Holbeck 9b 632. Baptised as Arthur Hiscox at St John the Evangelist, Wortley, 16 July 1848, birth 17 June 1848, parents cloth dresser John Hiscox and Elizabeth Hiscox. Source - Church of England Births and Baptisms 1813–1910, P111.1.1B, Leeds Chapelry of Wortley p.84, His birth certificate says: "Seventeenth of June 1848, Low Barr, Whitehall Road, Wortley. Arthur son of cloth dresser John Hiscox and Elizabeth Hiscox formerly Hudson". In the informant's signature box, it says: "X the mark of Elizabeth Hiscox mother, of Low Barr, Whitehall Road, Wortley. Twentieth of July 1848". Note: under the Births and Deaths Registration Act 1953, section 34, certified copies of bmd entries carrying the General Register Office seal are evidence of the birth or death to which they relate. For verification, anyone can purchase such a certified copy of the certificate from the General Record Office. The above information is taken from the certified birth certificate.) The 1851 Census finds him living with his parents and five of his siblings. His elder brother, then aged 15, was working, like their father, as a cloth dresser in a textile mill. (Note: 1851 England Census. Wortley, Leeds. HO.107.2314. P.23. Schedule 87.) Hiscoe achieved standard 4 at school, so his schooling probably ended when he was around 11 years old.

On 25 March 1869, Hiscoe married by licence Sarah Elizabeth Sykes, daughter of farmer John Coleman Sykes, at St Oswald's Church, Methley. (Note: Sarah Elizabeth Sykes (Pollington 1848 – Leeds 24 March 1931). GRO index: Births Sep 1848 Sykes Sarah Elizabeth Howden XXIII 59. Marriages Mar 1869 Hiscox Arthur and Sykes Sarah Elizabeth Pontefract 9c 111. Deaths Sep 1931 Hiscoe Sarah E. 83 Leeds South 9b 485. The marriage certificate says: 25 March 1869, Parish Church, Methley, Yorkshire, by licence. Arthur Hiscox of Leeds, 20, architect, son of John Hiscox, cloth finisher. Sarah Elizabeth Sykes of Methley, of full age, daughter of John Coleman Sykes, farmer. Hiscoe was still spelling his name as "Hiscox" at this point.) Hiscoe's address at the time of his marriage was his parents' residence: Holyrood House, Harrogate. They had fourteen children surnamed Hiscox, of whom four had died by 1911. (Note: 1911 England census for 1 West View, Beeston Hill, Leeds.) The couple moved house at least nine times during their married life. By 1871 the couple were living at Beech Grove Terrace, Starbeck, with their one-year-old son, Ernest Coulman Hiscox, and a servant. (Note: 1871 England Census. RG10/4286. P.7/35. Schedule 33.) By 1885 Hiscoe had a drawing office at 4, Albert Avenue, Starbeck. From at least 1881 he lived at Grosvenor Chambers, or Grosvenor House, East Parade, Harrogate, with his wife, six of his children, and a servant, (Note: 1881 England Census. Grosvenor House, East Parade, Harrogate. RG11/43/28. p.1/43. schedule 2. Hiscoe's residence, Grosvenor House, was, according to the 1881 Census, "at the bottom of East Parade, adjoining Grosvenor Terrace".) and he had an office at 11 Albert Street, Starbeck. By 1891, following his first bankruptcy, he, his wife and nine of his children were living at 15 Greenmount Terrace in Hunslet, Leeds, and he was working from home. (Note: 1891 England Census RG12/3666. p.13. Schedule 114.) Between 1891 and 1893 he and his family lived at Harlow Terrace, Harrogate, and various Leeds addresses, including Linden Road, 9 Camberley Street, 9 Sunbeam Street and 12 Sunbeam Avenue. The 1901 census finds Hiscoe, his wife, and seven of his children, living at 57 Holdforth Street, Wortley. (Note: 1901 England Census 57 Holdforth Street, Wortley, Leeds. RG13/4209 p.12. Schedule 69.) From at least 1911 until his death, his home address was 1 West View, Beeston Hill, Leeds, where the 1911 census finds him with his wife, two of his daughters, and a grandchild. (Note: 1911 England Census 1 West View, Beeston Hill, Leeds. Schedule 243.)

== Career ==
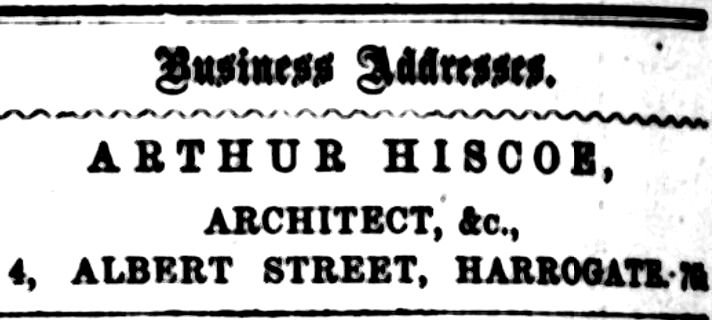
Hiscoe's business address, 1873

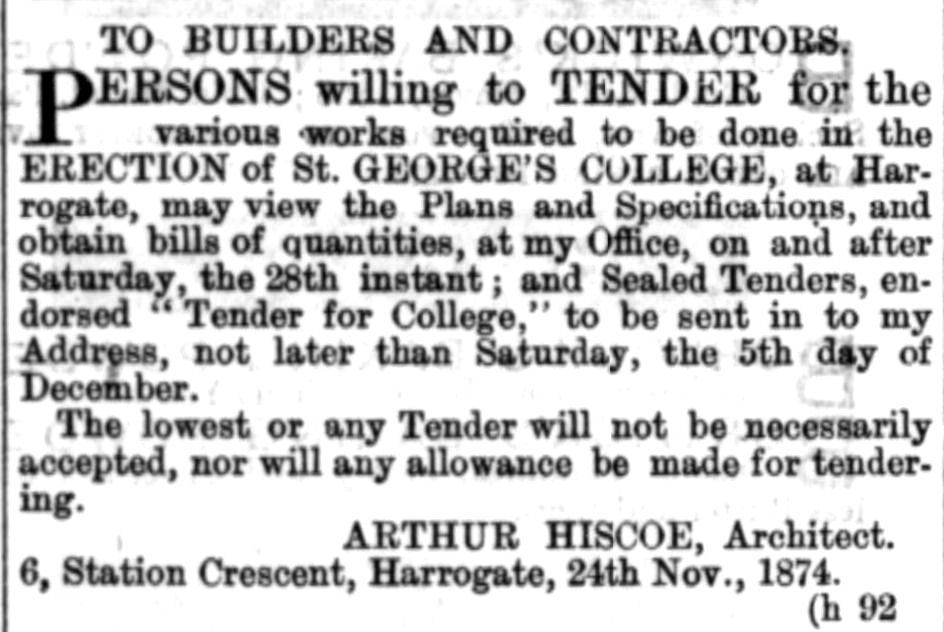
Hiscoe's business address, 1874

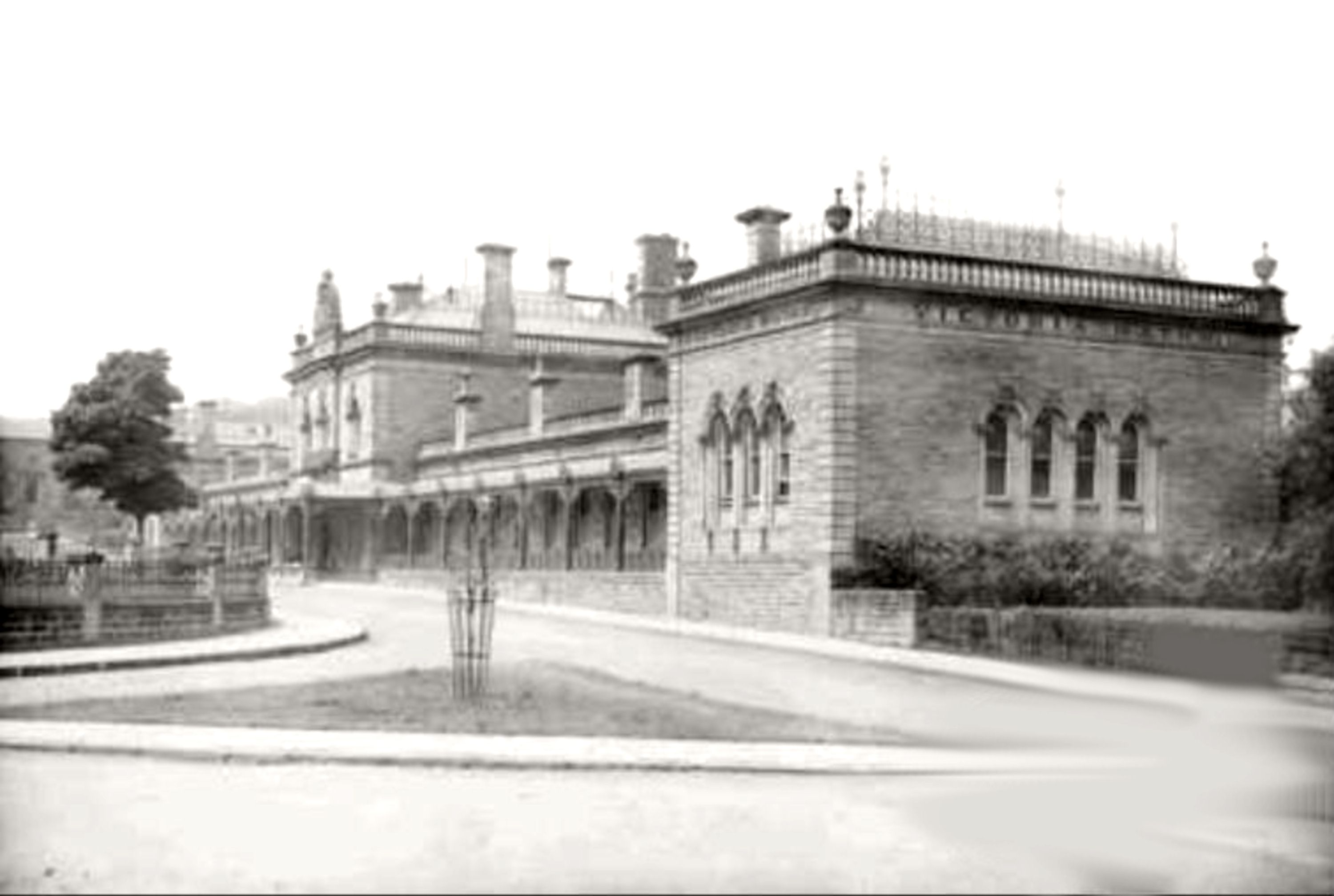
New Victoria Baths by James Richardson, 1871, possibly with features by Hiscoe

Hiscoe was an architect, surveyor, and photographer. According to the historian Malcolm Neesam, he was one of the "most eminent local architects" of Harrogate, the others being William Perkin, (Note: William Perkin (1809 – Harrogate 1874). Perkin & Backhouse flourished between c.1839 and 1865, working from offices in Leeds. After 1865 the practice continued under Perkin and his sons. Perkin designed Belvedere in Victoria Avenue for John Smith.) H. E. and A. Bown, and John Henry Hirst. Their designs were employed by the Victoria Park Company to construct much of central Harrogate in the mid 19th century.

The New Victoria Baths building was first discussed as a project in 1870 by Harrogate Borough Council, following the expansion of the town. In due course designs by Hiscoe, H. E. and A. Bown with Messrs Nelson of Leeds, and the brothers R. and H. Dyson were received and awarded premiums. However the council chose to appoint its surveyor James Richardson as architect. According to Malcolm Neesam, "an odour of shabby behaviour clings to the whole affair, as it was rumoured that Richardson had copied the best ideas from each design". The baths were opened on 26 August 1871, and Richardson was credited for the work. The building was later converted for use as Harrogate Borough Council's offices, then was sold for commercial use after the council moved to new premises. In 2010, the council associated Hiscoe with the design.

In March 1871, still under the name Hiscox, he was calling for tenders for a new school at Doghouse, Heckmondwike, in association with the Upper Chapel Schools in the same area. In April of that year he was celebrating at the Royal Hotel, Harrogate, with his contractors and workmen, the erection of "four handsome villas" in Station Parade, Harrogate, which he had designed for Mrs Pearson.

Hiscoe designed the South Park Hydro in South Park Road in 1872, (Note: The South Park Hydro was on South Park Road, Harrogate, not to be confused with the Cairn Hydro, which building was and is on the Ripon Road (A61), Harrogate.) although that venture did not survive for long as a business. In 1874 he was calling for builders' tenders for two villas in Lofthouse, West Yorkshire, for the Leeds and Yorkshire Cooperative Mining Company. In 1875 he designed a large riding school on East Park Road, Harrogate, for Charles Burgess, and two semi-detached villas for James Lomas in Victoria Park. In 1878 he designed six residences for the Alexandra Park estate, Harrogate.

Hiscoe ran a drawing office at 4 Albert Street, Harrogate, from at least September 1873. By 1874 he was also using a second office at 6 Station Crescent, Harrogate. He became bankrupt in 1885. He moved from Harrogate to Leeds around 1888, and according to the Harrogate Advertiser he "had plenty of work until the beginning of 1891". Thereafter, less work was available to him, and in 1893 he was bankrupted again – due, he said, to "inability to obtain work and to sickness in his family". By that time he had no assets, and his liabilities were £107 5s 2d (equivalent to £11,915.51 in 2025). (Note: See Press cutting: Bankruptcy acts 1883 and 1890, receiving orders", Harrogate Herald, 9 February 1893) but he continued to work afterwards.

== Designs ==
=== Former Wesleyan Day School, Ripon, 1871 ===
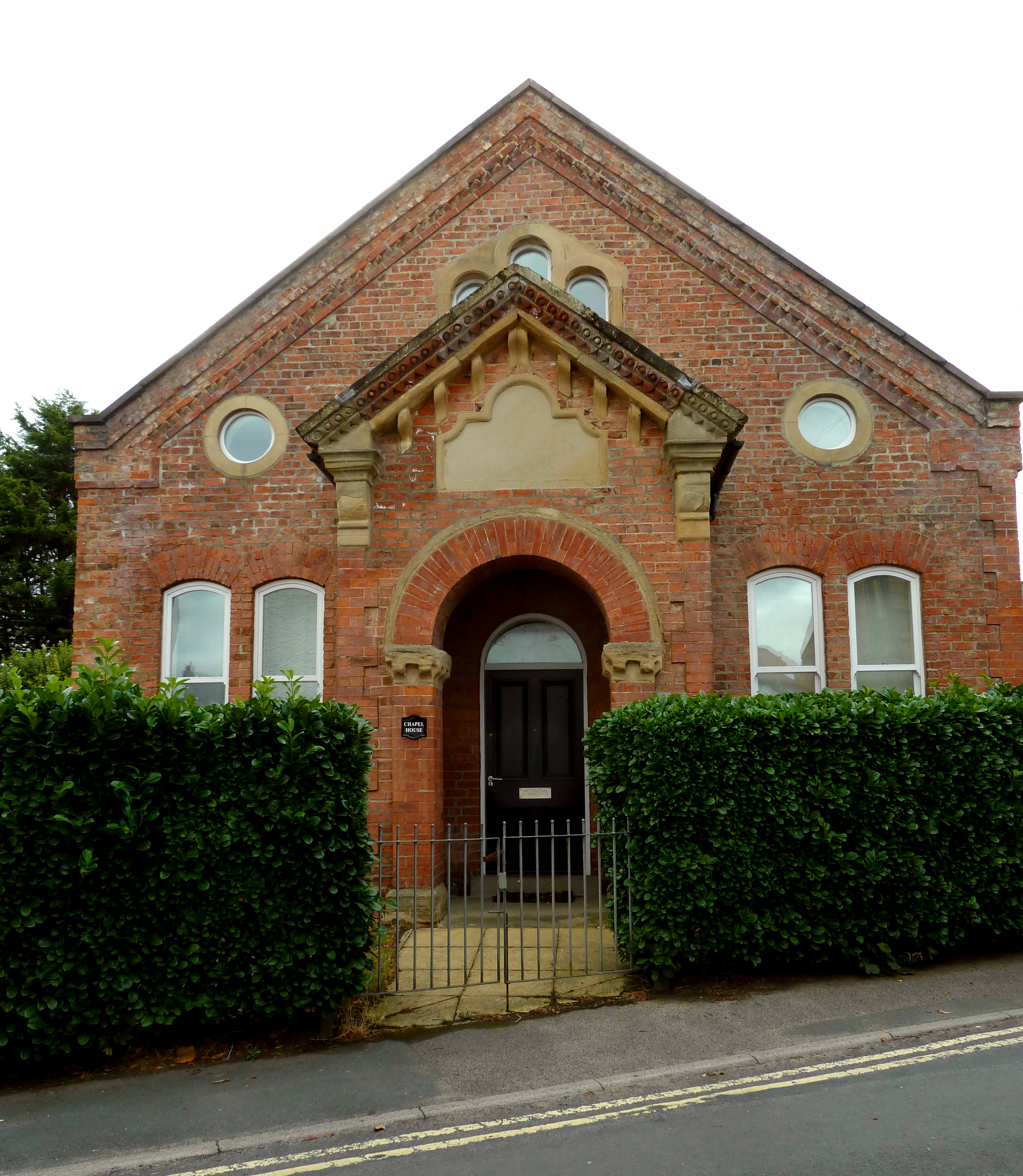
Former Wesleyan Day School, in 2026

Hiscoe, at 22 years old and still under the name Hiscox, was working on his own account from an office in James Street, Harrogate, from at least 9 July 1870, when he was calling for tenders for the Ripon Wesleyan School building. This "substantial" school building at 1 St Wilfrid's Road, (Note: See image of the Wesleyan School Building, St Wilfrid's Road, here.) was erected opposite The Old Chapel, Ripon on Coltsgate Hill. The school was opened on 2 June 1871. The occasion was celebrated with a sermon by Rev. Peter McKenzie of Sunderland, a public tea in the schoolroom, and an evening lecture on David to raise funds for the building. The school was closed in 1934 by West Riding Education Committee, and in due course was converted into flats. Of Hiscoe's design, only the façade and part of one side wall were retained.

=== Former Primitive Methodist Chapel, Mount Parade, Harrogate, 1872 ===
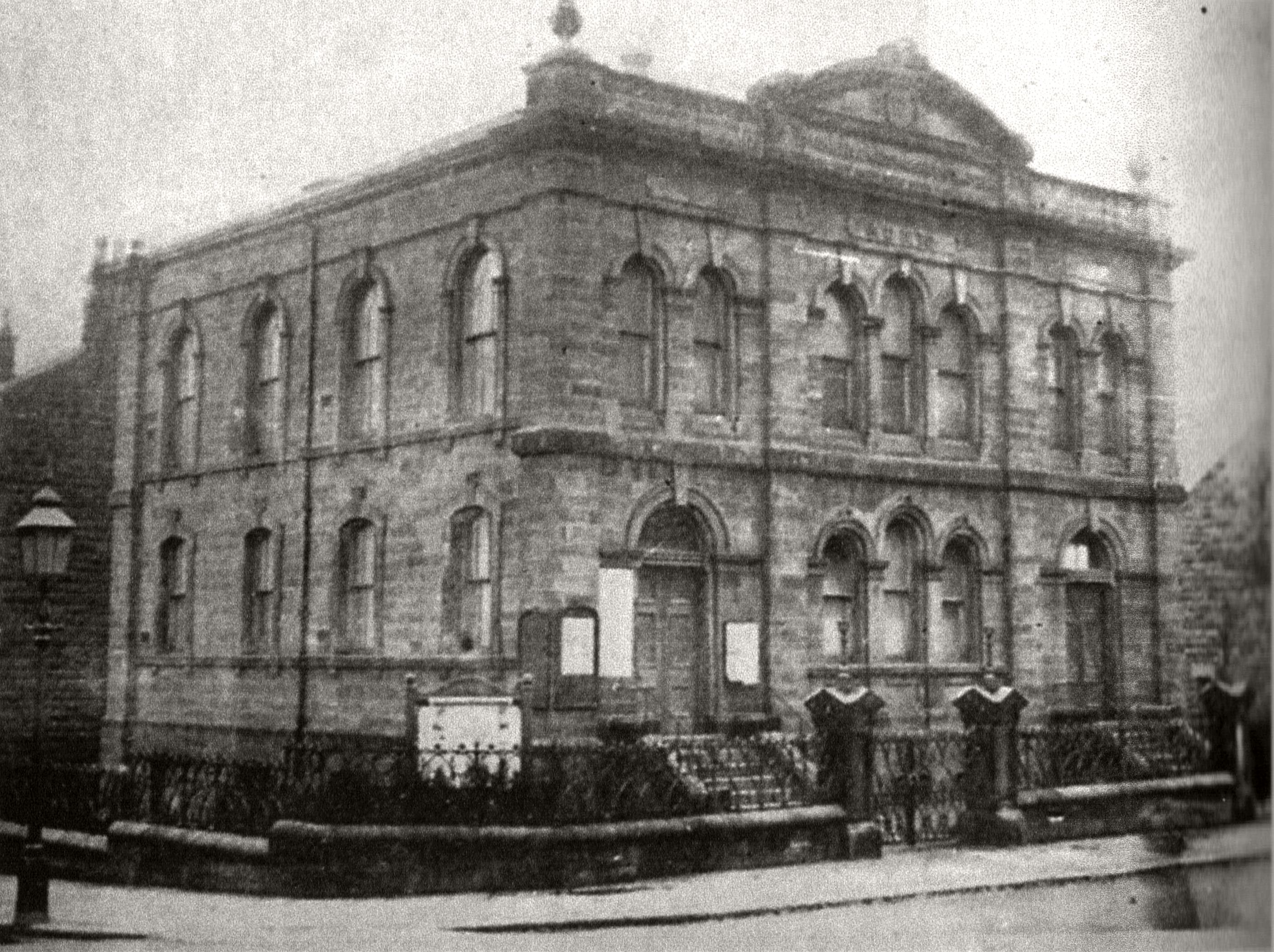
Former Primitive Methodist Chapel, before 1914

The Primitive Methodist Chapel on the corner of Cheltenham Parade and Mount Street in Harrogate was designed by Hiscoe. John Spoor of Bebside laid the foundation stone on 28 September 1871. The chapel was opened on 1 October 1872, on land which then belonged to the Victoria Park Company. Malcolm Neesam describes it as a "strong, box-shaped structure with overtones of the Italian Renaissance beloved of the architect". The chapel was built for a congregation of 450. Besides the main hall, it included a chapel-keeper's house, a minister's vestry and a schoolroom. The Primitive Methodists later moved to Dragon Parade Church, which was opened on 18 September 1900. In 1910 the Mount Parade chapel was converted into the Empire Theatre, a music hall run by the puppeteer Thomas Holden junior until 1931. It was a cinema in the 1930s. In the 1950s it was a pram shop, run by Fridel Dalling-Hay née Meyer. From the 1970s it has been a restaurant, converted again in 1986-1987 for Pinocchio's. It was fire-damaged in 1994, but reopened the same year. It was occupied by the restaurant Cardamom Black until 2026, when it closed. Of Hiscoe's original front and side elevations, only the façades of the top storeys remain.

=== Former Wesleyan Day and Sunday Schools, Harrogate, 1873 ===
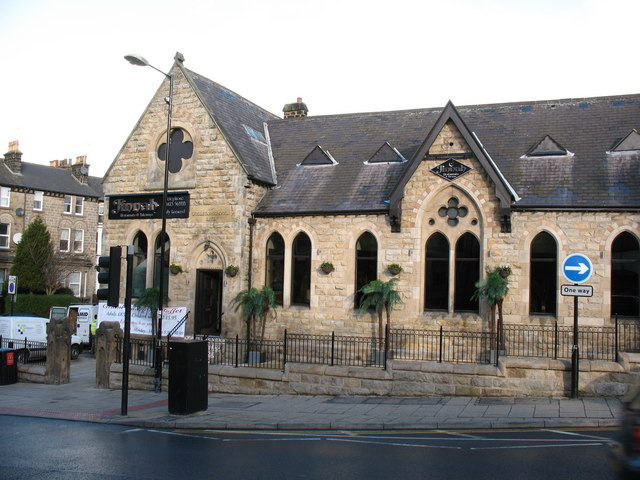
Former Wesleyan schools, Harrogate

The foundation stone of the Wesleyan Day and Sunday Schools (also known as the Wesley Chapel School Room) on the corner of Cheltenham Parade and Cheltenham Mount, Harrogate, was laid by William Farrar Smith of Leeds on 25 June 1873, (Note: William Farrar Smith (1817– 18 August 1891) was a cloth manufacturer, magistrate and nonconformist based in Leeds, West Yorkshire. See: "Death of a Leeds magistrate", Yorkshire Evening Post, 19 August 1891, p.4 col.2 Note that Neesam reports a different foundation date and cost for the Wesley Chapel School Room.) attended by a "large and fashionable gathering".. A commemorative bottle containing a document relating the proceedings was laid under the stone. It named the trustees, including the merchant Samuel Sugden, George Dawson, and Hiscoe (spelled as "Hiscox") the architect of the schools. Farrar Smith described the building as "a protest against cry that was being made to exclude the Bible from the [secular] day schools". This Gothic Revival building was designed for 300 children, and to include a large, main school room with a gable wing at each end. One wing was to accommodate the teacher, and the other contained a kitchen, classroom and basement for the boiler. Also included were two more ground-floor classrooms, with an infants' classroom above. The exterior was built of pitch-faced Birk Crag wall-stone, and the windows had gothic arches of red and white stone. Outside was an iron-fenced playground. The total cost of the school was about £6,233 (equivalent to £585,951.90 in 2025). The building was opened on 1 May 1874. As of 2026, the building was occupied by the Jinnah restaurant.

=== Former Station Hotel, Harrogate, 1873 ===
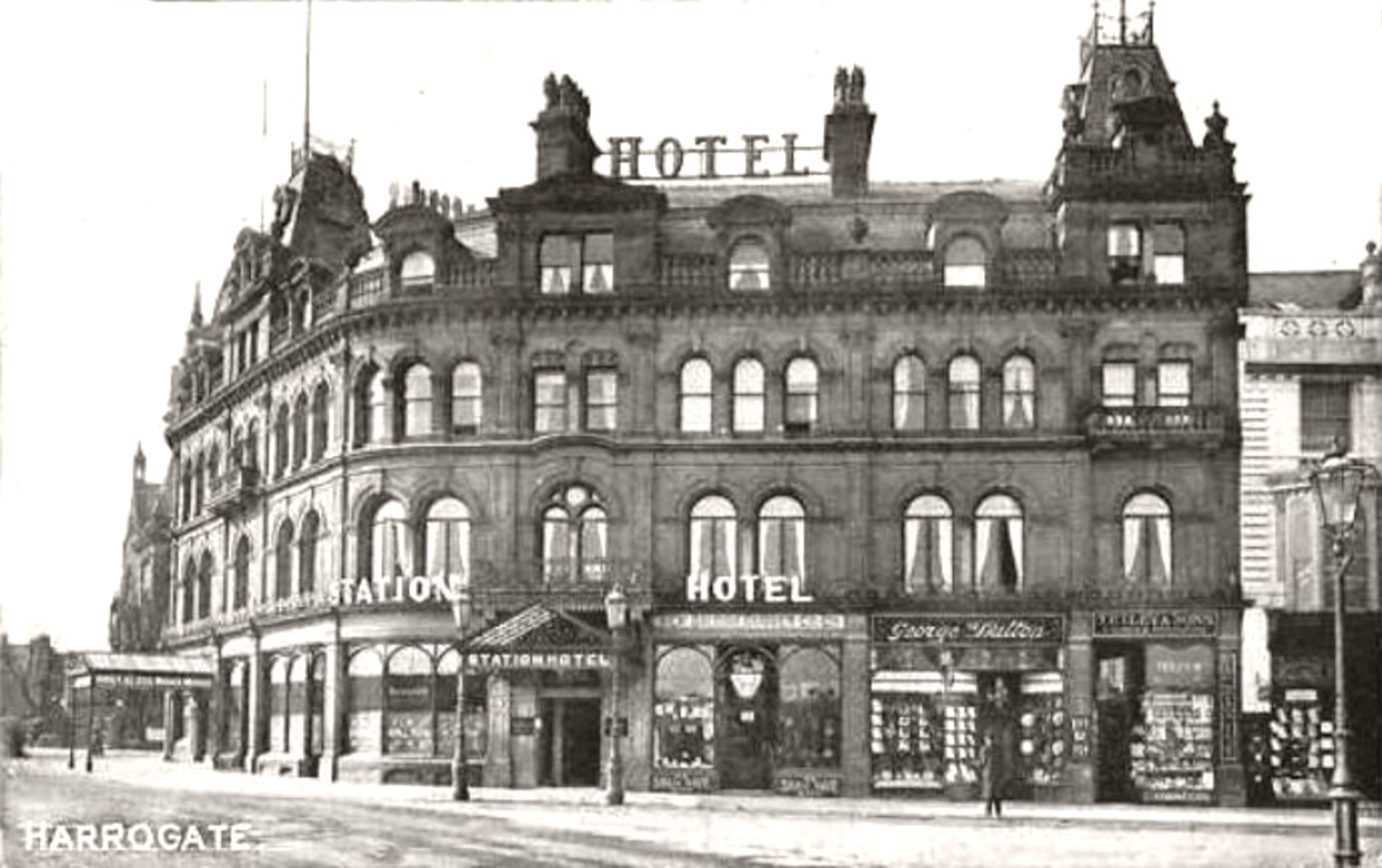
Former Station Hotel, before 1914

The former Station Hotel was originally a commercial hotel, designed for commercial travellers who required short stays. It is situated at 1 Station Square, on the corner of James Street and Station Parade, Harrogate, and was designed by Hiscoe for his father John Hiscoe, the proprietor, at a cost of £9,000 (equivalent to £846,072.06 in 2025). It was topped out in October 1873, when Hiscoe was 24 years old. The building was described in the Pateley Bridge and Nidderdale Herald as follows:

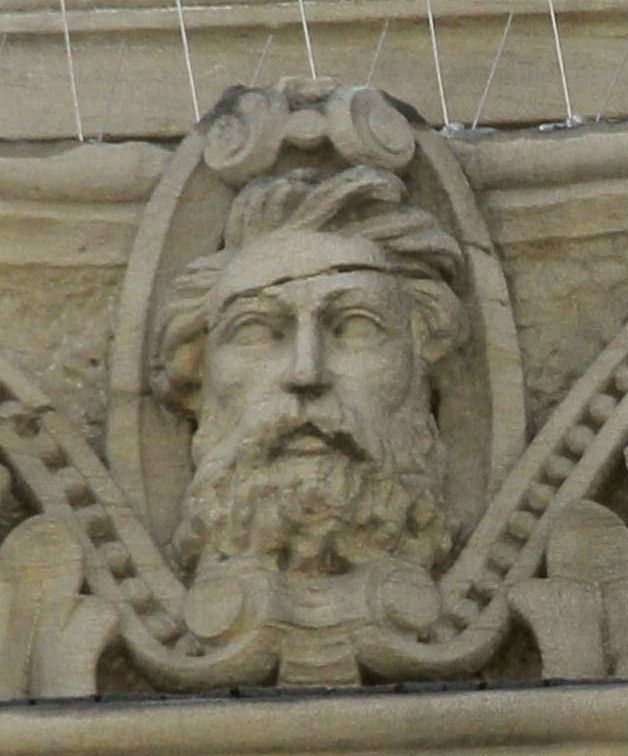
Head on a capital, by Benjamin Payler

It [is] somewhat after the American fashion, but in a modern and most perfect system. The kitchens [are] at the top of the house, and there [is] no nuisance arising therefrom to the visitors in the house. The house itself [consists] of a large dining and coffee room, a large drawing room, a commercial room, smoke room, 24 bedrooms, bath rooms, two splendid kitchens, suitable for the proper carrying on of a large hotel, lavatories, and all necessary closets, &c. – altogether 31 rooms ... The basement of the hotel [is] let off for shops and offices. [John Hiscoe is] bound not to allow any of these shops to sell liquors [and no dram shop is permitted there].

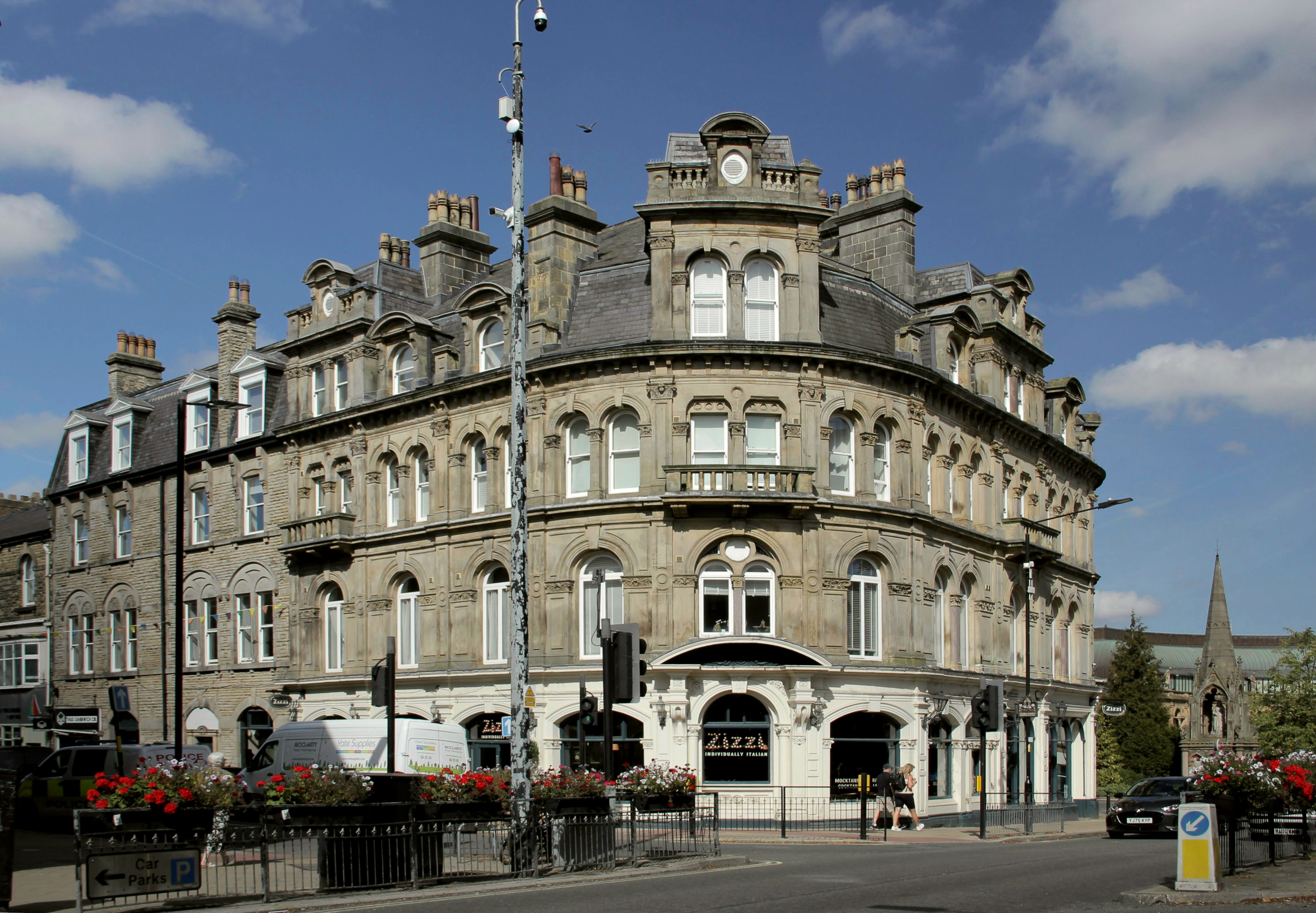
Zizzi restaurant, 2026

A celebration dinner was organised by John Hiscoe for the 70 workmen at the George Hotel, Harrogate on Friday 31 October 1873. Arthur Hiscoe took the chair for the toasts, and Mr Place was the vice chairman. Place gave a speech in which he "noticed some of the peculiar architectural beauties which characterise all the buildings which have been designed by Mr A. Hiscoe". He expressed "the high esteem he entertained for [Hiscoe's] character and talents; and the pleasure it gave him to see a young man of so much promise, occupying the chair on that occasion, with the earnest wish that he might live to attend as many roaring suppers as he (the speaker) had done, and also that as an architect he might always have the pleasure of seeing his plans and specifications well and faithfully carried out". In August 1874, Hiscoe applied for a premises licence for alcohol on behalf of his father John Hiscoe, who owned the Station Hotel. The application was opposed at Knaresborough Court House by representatives of the Licensed Victuallers' Association, which feared competition. After much interrogation of Hiscoe, the licence was permitted. The building was later reopened as the Harlow Gate pub, and as of 2026 the premises were occupied by the restaurant Zizzi.

=== Former Public Market, Harrogate (Old Market Building), 1874 ===
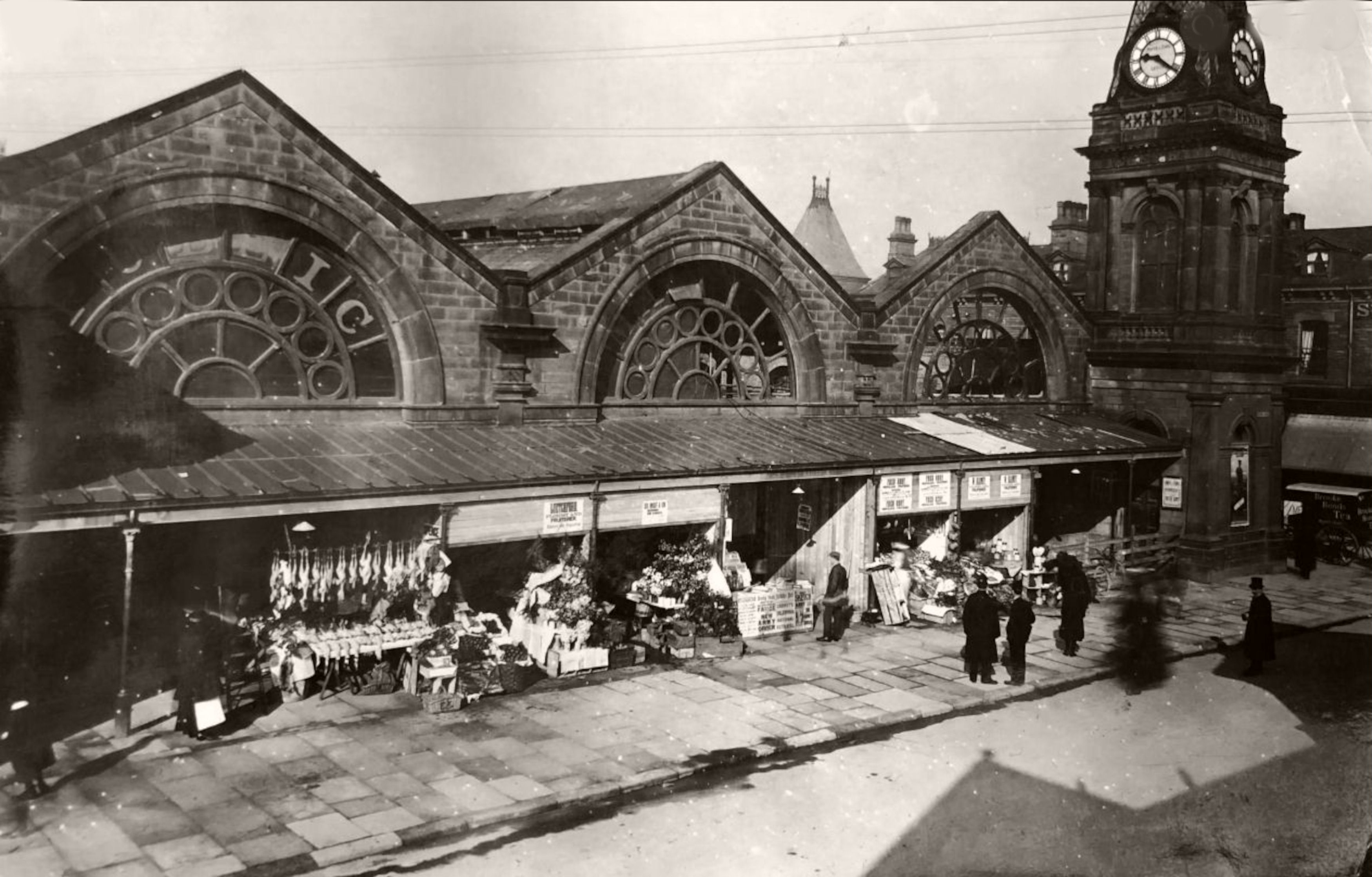
Public Market, early 1930s

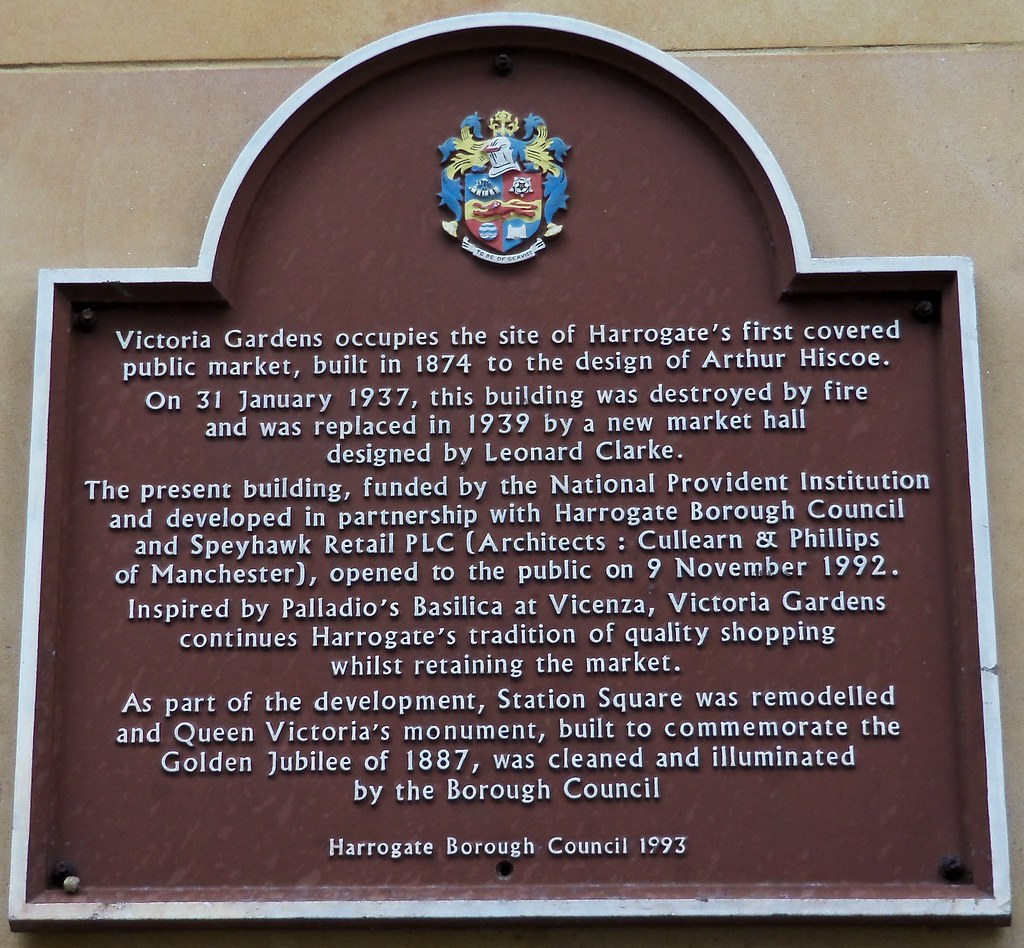
Brown plaque for first Harrogate market building

A need for a dedicated Harrogate market was first mooted in 1840, but the expanding town had to wait. The Harrogate Improvement Commissioners (HIC) discussed the issue between 1863 and 1873, "when for that purpose [they] purchased a plot of land at the top of Cambridge Street from Messrs R. and N. Carter, a plot which had been specially set apart for the purpose by those gentlemen so long ago as when they were laying out the Victoria Park Estate". On 22 December 1873 Hiscoe won a competition for the design of the market. It was to be Harrogate's first covered public market, on the site which is now Victoria Gardens, Station Parade, opposite Harrogate railway station. In January 1874 he was calling for contractors to build a new public market and weigh house on that site, for the HIC and the Local Board of Health.

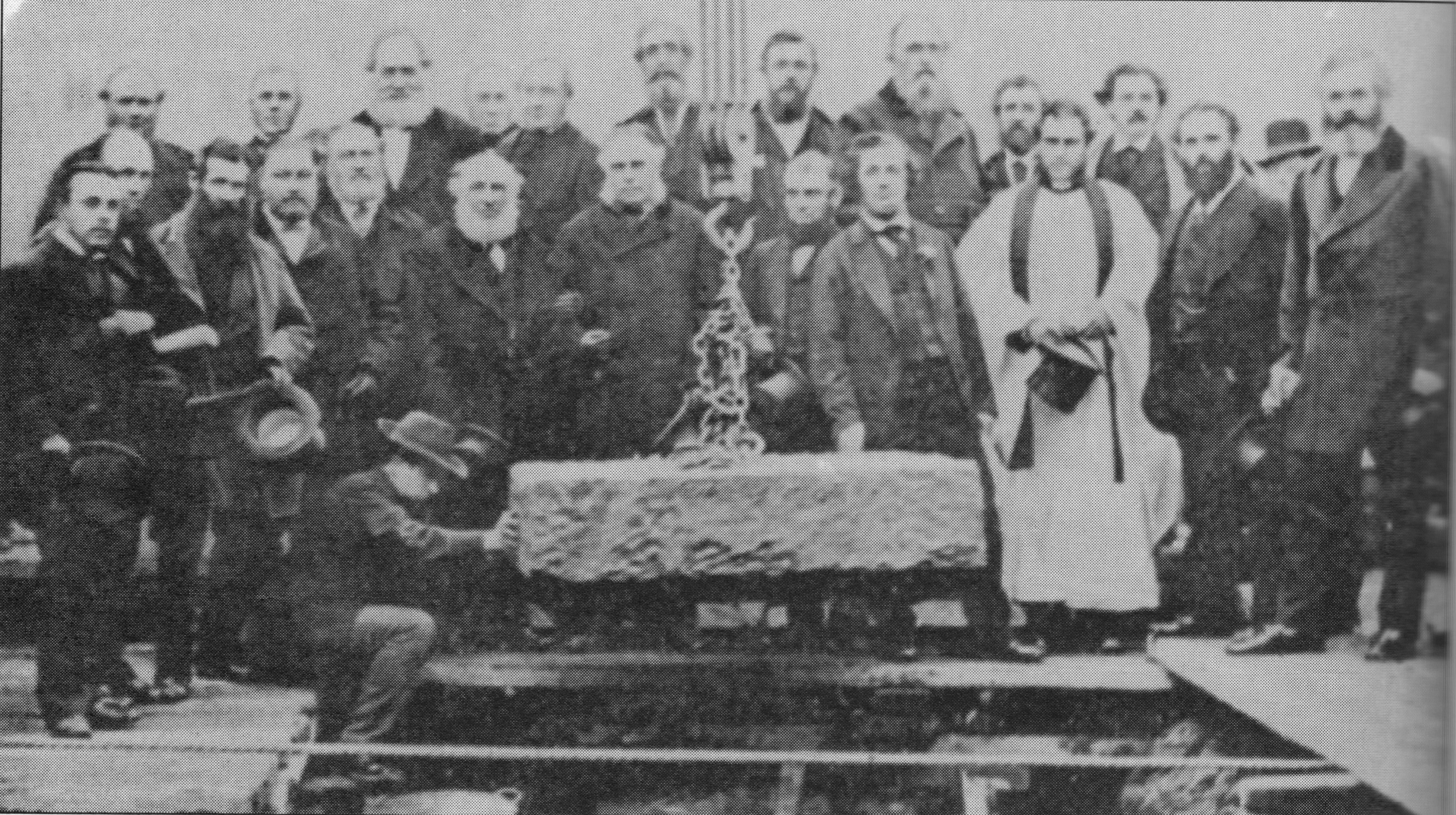
Public Market: foundation stone, 1874

The foundation stone was laid on 28 February 1874 by John Barber, chairman of the HIC, and founder of Harrogate Markets. (Note: John Barber, J.P. (born Harrogate 17 October 1822). Chairman of Harrogate Gas Company. See his portrait here.) The commissioners, headed by the Rifle Band and followed by the architect and contractors, proceeded to the site from the board room at the New Baths. Flags were raised, crowds lined the streets, and the bells of Old St Mary's Church rang. The ceremonial mallet and trowel for the laying of the stone was presented to Barber by Hiscoe and the contractors. The trowel was of silver with an ivory handle, and the mallet was of polished walnut. The inscription on the trowel blade said: "This trowel was presented to John Barber, Esq., Chairman of the Harrogate Improvement Commissioners and Local Board of Health by the contractors, on the occasion of his laying the chief corner stone of the New Public Market, February 28th, 1874. Arthur Hiscoe, architect. Ed Winterburn, R.A. Rayworth, William Leek, John Exelby, Waldby & Shepherd, Geo[rge] Dent, contractors". To commemorate the occasion, Hiscoe, the HIC and other great men of Harrogate including George Dawson, Richard Ellis and Isaac Thomas Shutt were photographed together (pictured, right). Of this group portrait, historian Malcolm Neesam commented: "Harrogate's debt to these men is too great to be calculated". Following the ceremony, the local board members and officers dined with Barber and Hiscoe at the George Hotel, Harrogate.

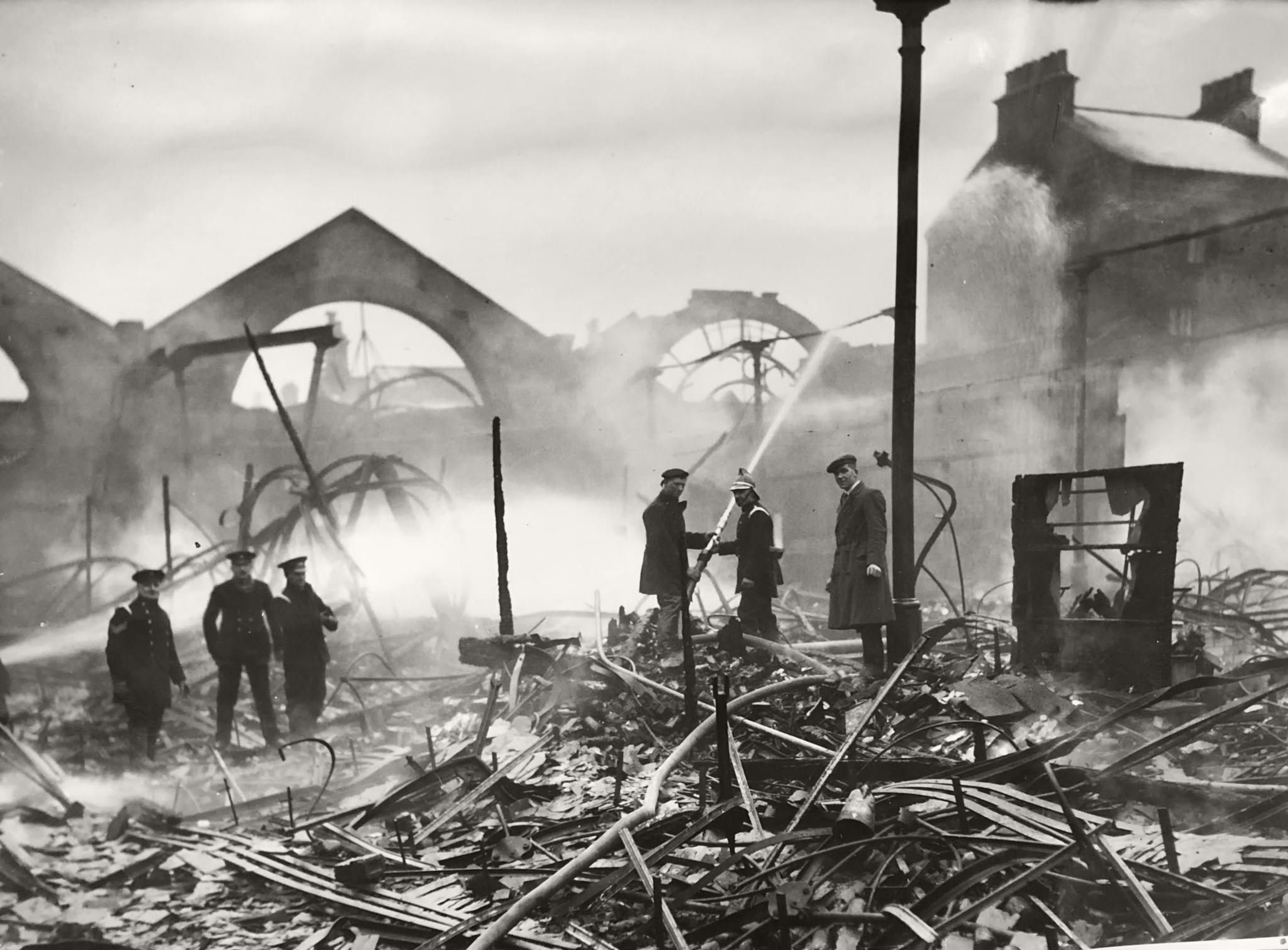
Public Market fire, 1937

The building cost around £3,600,(equivalent to £351,965.98 in 2025). and was opened on 29 August 1874 by Henry Greensmith, the succeeding chairman of the HIC, in the presence of a crowd of around 2,000. The building was described by the York Herald as, "a very handsome and convenient edifice". Greensmith was presented with an illuminated address bound in crimson morocco. As at the foundation ceremony, the board, officers and Greensmith were treated to dinner at the George Hotel. A woman died when exiting the covered market into its yard in October 1874, after walking through a sliding door which fell on her head. At the inquest, Hiscoe presented his plans for the market doors and said that the cause of the accident was a missing pin, and Raworth the contractor said he had forgotten or misunderstood the plans. The jury said that the doors should be repaired with the missing pins, and Hiscoe confirmed that he would attend to it at once.

A clock tower was added as a gift from Angela Burdett-Coutts following discussions in 1875, when the council struggled to pay for it. The clock was designed by Sir Edmund Beckett, completed in 1877, and contained a clock with four faces by William Potts. The market caught fire in 1914 but was saved. It finally burned down on 31 January 1937, leaving only its clock tower standing. The clock tower was demolished in the 1980s. The building was succeeded by a 1939 build by Leonard Clarke, then by the Victoria Shopping Centre of 1992.

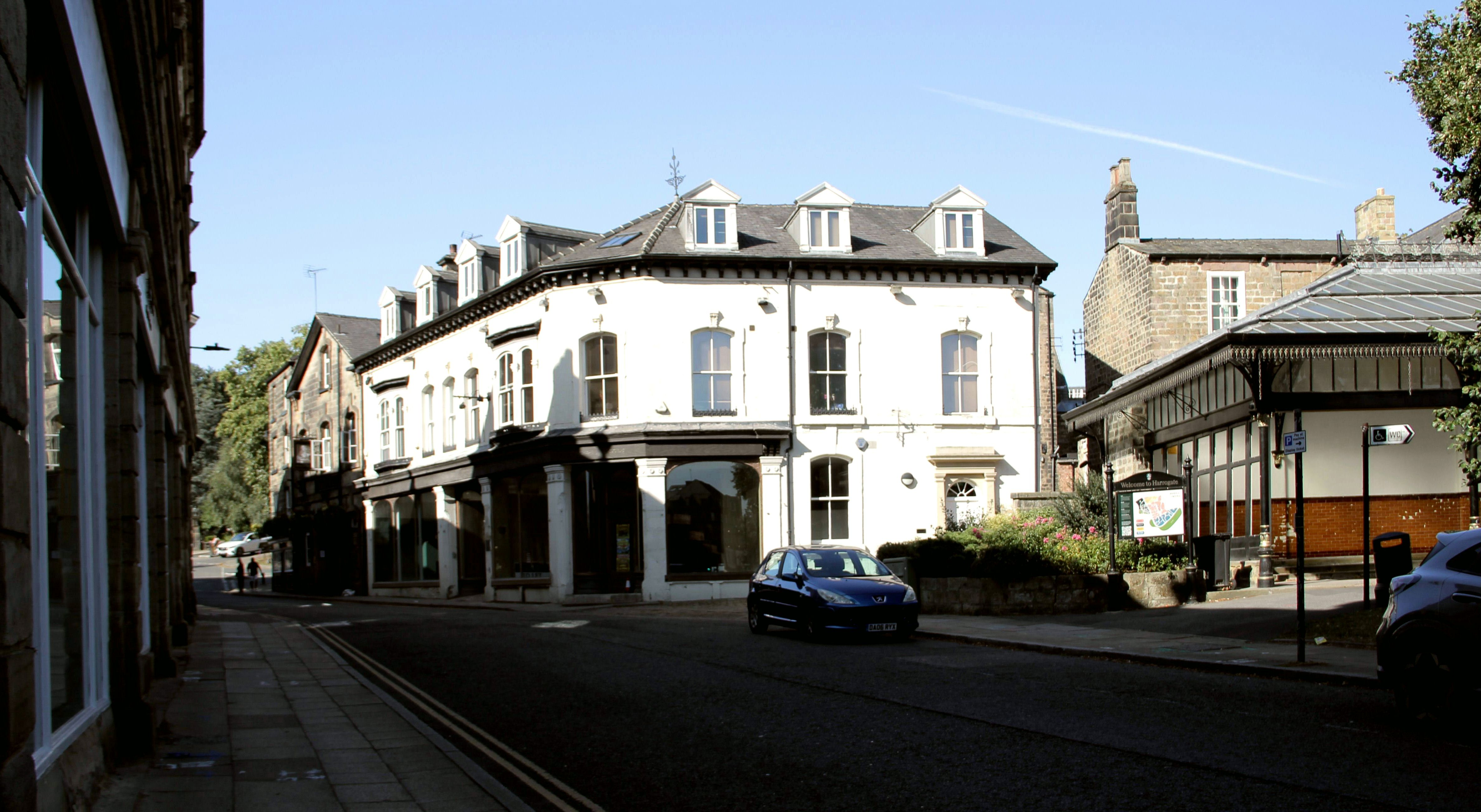
Farrah's former toffee shop

=== John Farrah's former toffee shop, Harrogate, 1875 ===
The design by Hiscoe for John Farrah's former toffee shop at 3 and 4 Crescent Road, Harrogate, was commissioned in 1875 by Hodgeson's inn (later Hales) and John Farrah. It was built on the space between the former Crescent Hotel and Promenade Inn. (Note: John Farrah's former toffee shop, built 1875. See: File:Farrah's grocery shop Harrogate (1).jpg.)

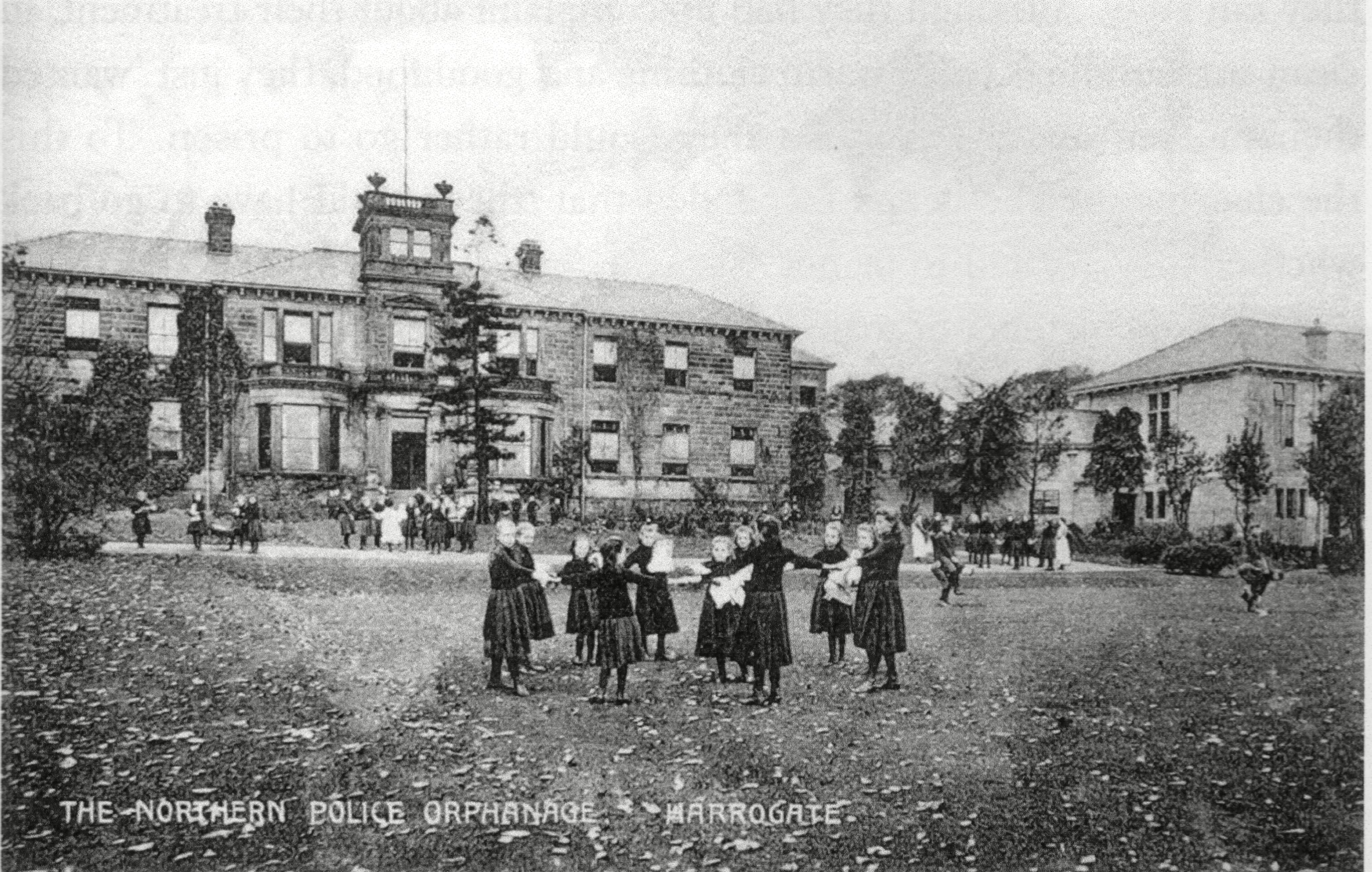
Former St George's College

=== Former St George's College, Harrogate, 1870s ===
In the 1870s Hiscoe designed St George's College, which was built on the corner of Otley Road and Harlow Hill Road, Harlow Hill, Harrogate. The school closed some time before 1898, when the building was converted to become the Northern Police Orphanage. The structure was demolished in 1976, and housing was erected on the site.

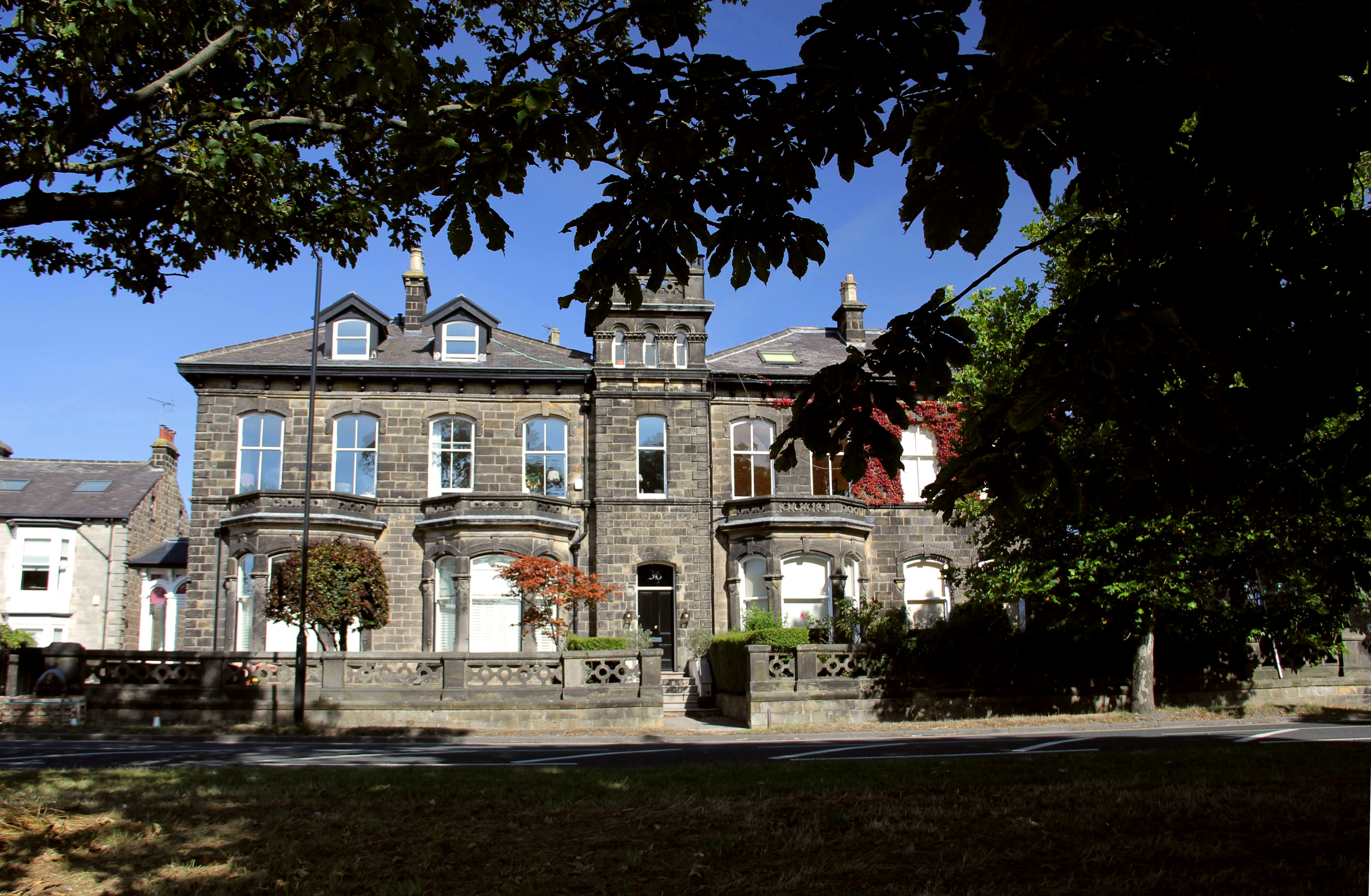
36–37 York Place, in 2026

=== 36–37 York Place, Harrogate, 1870s ===
Hiscoe designed two large, stone, semi-detached houses, one of which is named Princes Villa, at 36–37 York Place, Harrogate. (Note: Princes Villa can be seen on Google Street View.)

=== Former St James' Hall, Harrogate, 1882 ===
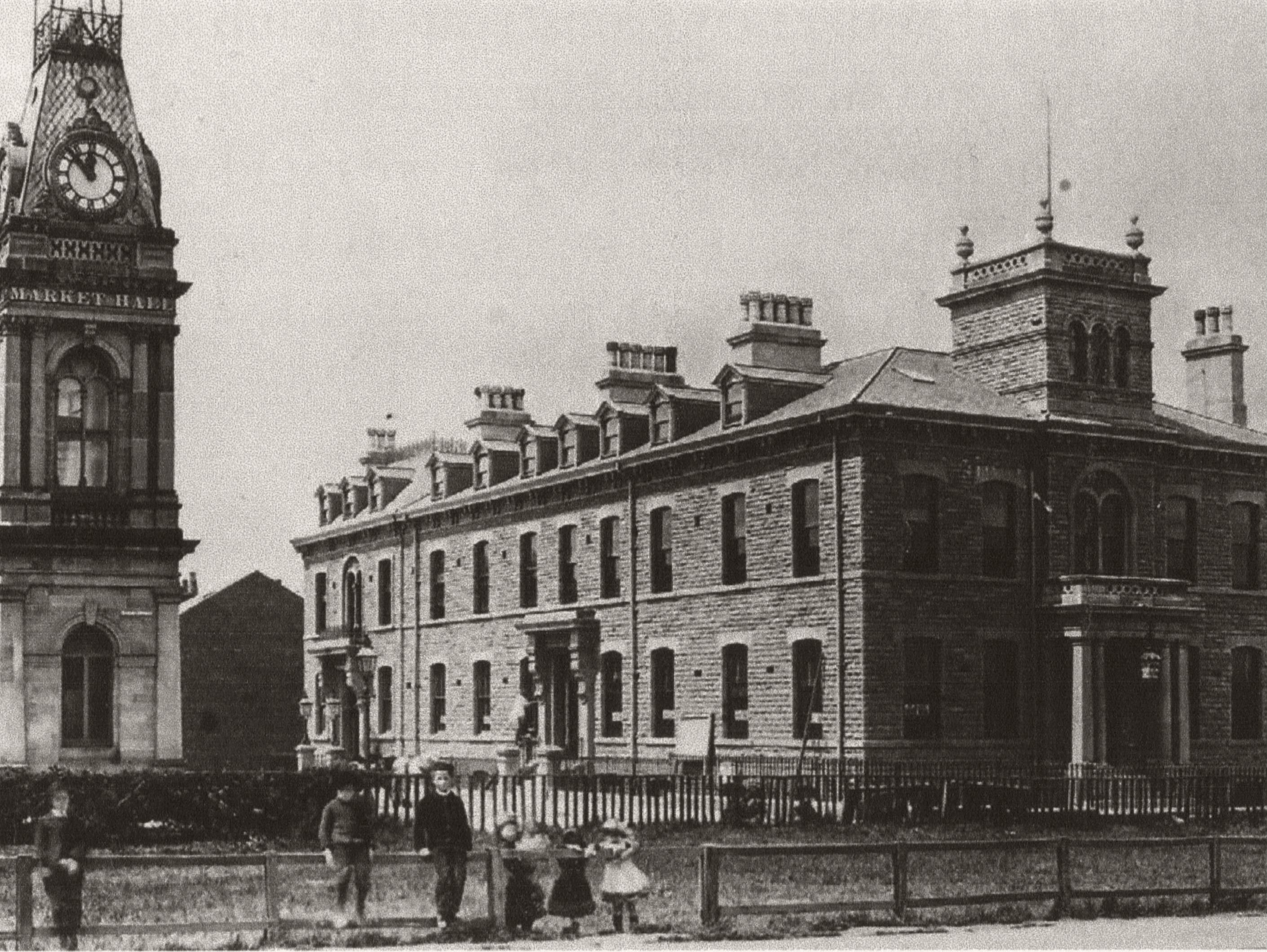
St James' Hall, before 1914

The former St James' Hall, first mooted in 1880, stood on the corner of Beulah Street and Cambridge Street, Harrogate, and was part of a larger building designed by Hiscoe and opened on 27 May 1882 by Dr Andrew Scott Myrtle J.P. (Note: Dr Andrew Scott Myrtle (c.1826 – Knaresborough 1907) GRO index: Deaths Jun 1907 Myrtle Andrew Scott 81 Knaresbro' 9a 73. He was the owner of an Italianate mansion in Harrogate, a spa doctor, a councillor, president of Harrogate Medical Society, and president of Harrogate Cricket Club.) The building included a cocoa house with billiard room and hotel facilities in the centre, St James' Hall on the left, and Harrogate Gentleman's Club on the right. It faced the tower of the Old Market Building. St James' Hall functioned as a galleried theatre seating a total of 650, with windows and lighting for day and night use. The stage could be removed to convert the hall to a ballroom or large dining room. The gentleman's club (which as of 2026 occupies The Harrogate Club) had a grand, porticoed entrance facing the railway station. The structure was described by the Harrogate Advertiser and Knaresborough Post as "a fine piece of architecture, having a bold stone portico in the Tuscan order and a very neat balcony". Malcolm Neesam says in his 2022 book, Wells and Swells, that the building had "expensive and artistic fittings and furnishings, which included stained glass windows on the gently rising staircase".

== Alterations and extensions ==
=== Former Industrial Home, Ripon, 1873 ===
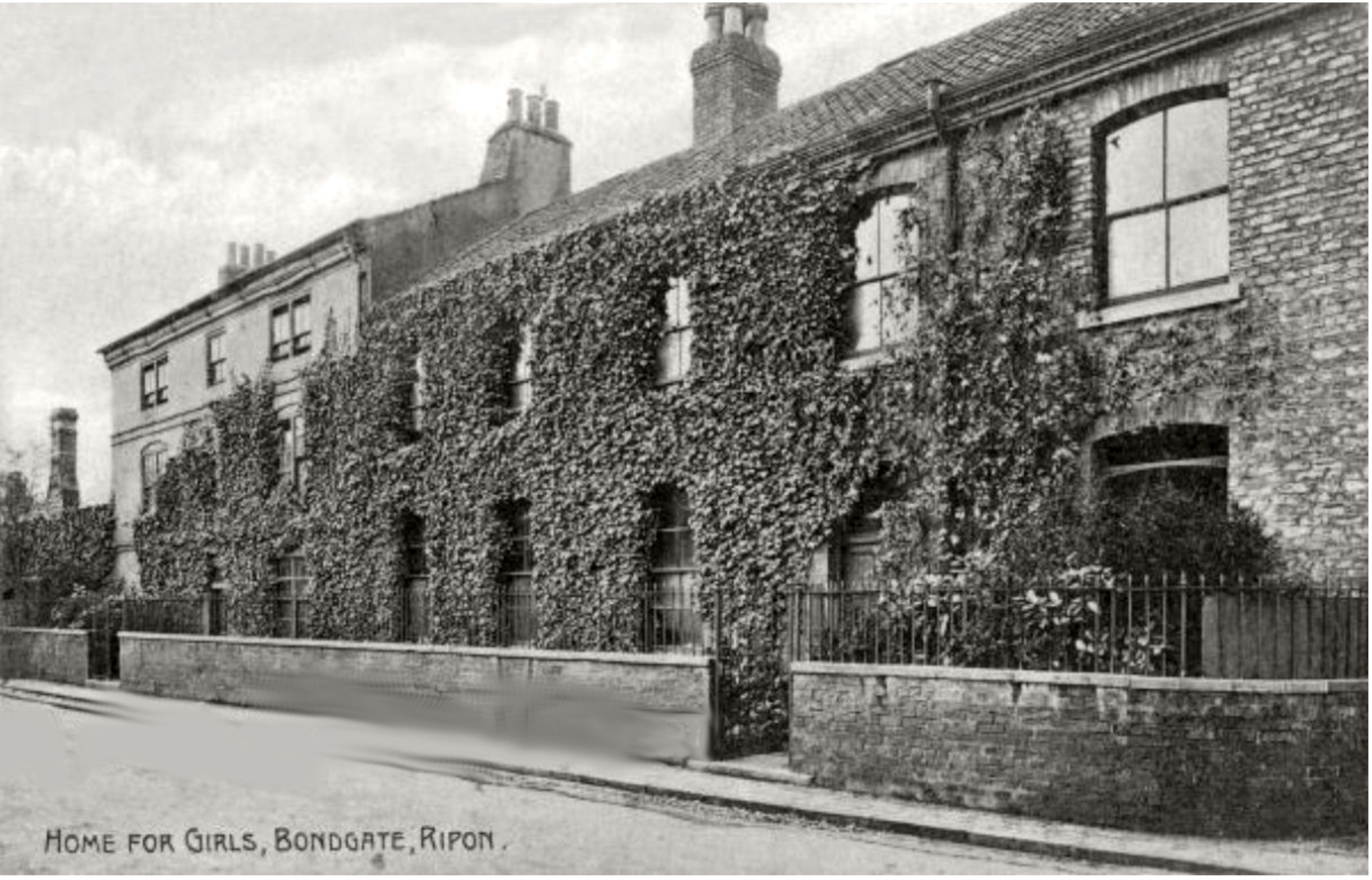
Industrial Home, Ripon

The 1862 Industrial Home for Girls, at 33 Bondgate, Ripon, was a home for motherless girls aged between nine and sixteen years. In 1873 Hiscoe enlarged and altered the building. In the 1920s the institution moved to West Mount, Kirkby Road, Ripon, and was renamed, "West Mount". It became a Barnardo's home in 1935, and both buildings were later demolished.

=== Former Promenade Room and Old Victoria Baths, 1874–1876 ===
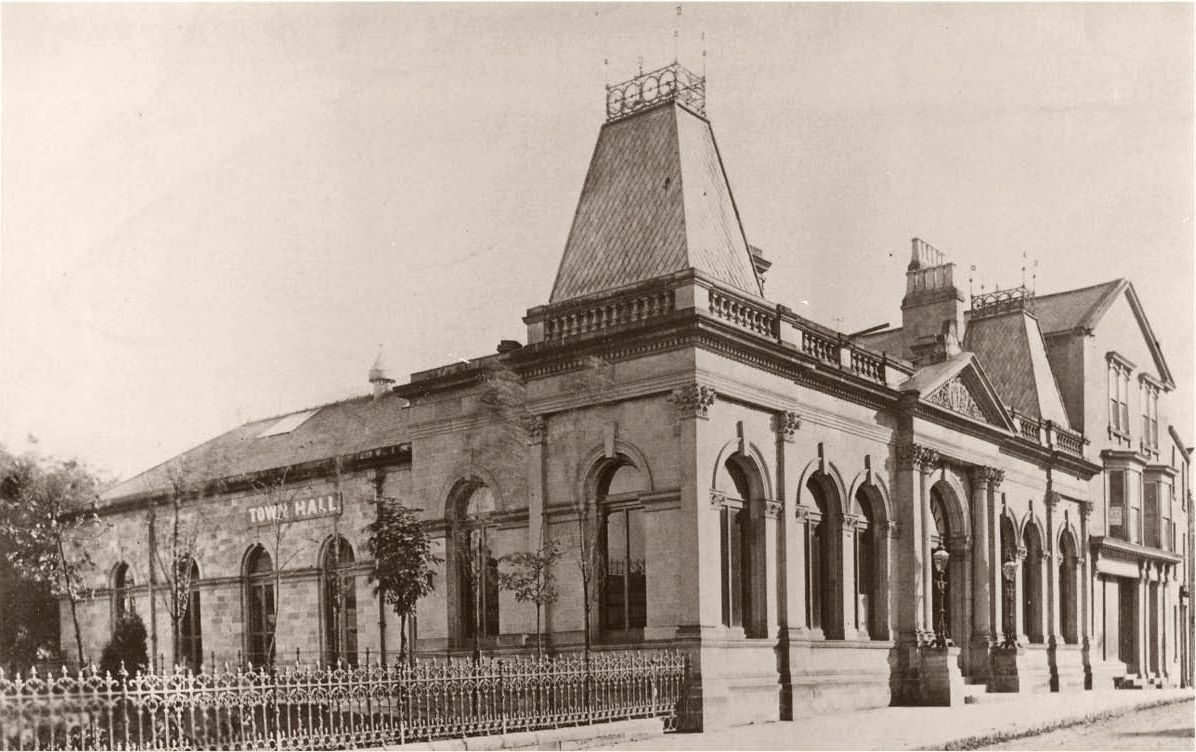
The Old Town Hall building, in 1890

The Promenade Room (now the Mercer Art Gallery) is a Grade II listed building. It was founded in 1805 and was remodelled by Hiscoe at a cost of £3,500 (equivalent to £9,976.36 in 2025) between 1874 and 1876. The commission was awarded by competition, and Hiscoe was chosen by the Harrogate Improvement Commissioners (HIC) from among four entrants on 30 October 1874. In November 1874 he was calling for builders' tenders for "the erection of a covered promenade, pump room, storage reservoirs, &c., additional baths and sanitary accommodation" on behalf of the HIC. Hiscoe added the western façade on Swan Road, along with a general rebuild. (Note: English Heritage names the 1870s architect of the rebuild of the Mercer Art Gallery as J. Hiscox.) The entrance is "flanked by attached columns and a handsome entablature enriched with symbols of the locality". Hiscoe's interior refurbishment included an internal hall with coffered ceiling, and two new rooms either side of the front door. English Heritage now describes the hall as a "5-bay assembly room with coved cornice and arched windows"; the coffered ceiling is now gone. Although Hiscoe had been chosen by the commissioners to rebuild the Old Victoria Baths, they were dismantled and the material used to build a new pump room according to Hiscoe's plans. The pump room was later dismantled. The building later became the Old Town Hall, and has been occupied by the Mercer Art Gallery since 2001.

=== Former Spa Rooms Skating Rink extension, Harrogate, 1876 ===
This was an outdoor asphalt skating rink for roller skating. The extended rink was used by newspaper proprietor William Hammond Breare for the organisation of masquerades and ice carnivals. After Prince Arthur (later Duke of Connaught) visited the rink, it became Prince Arthur's Skating Rink.

== Death ==
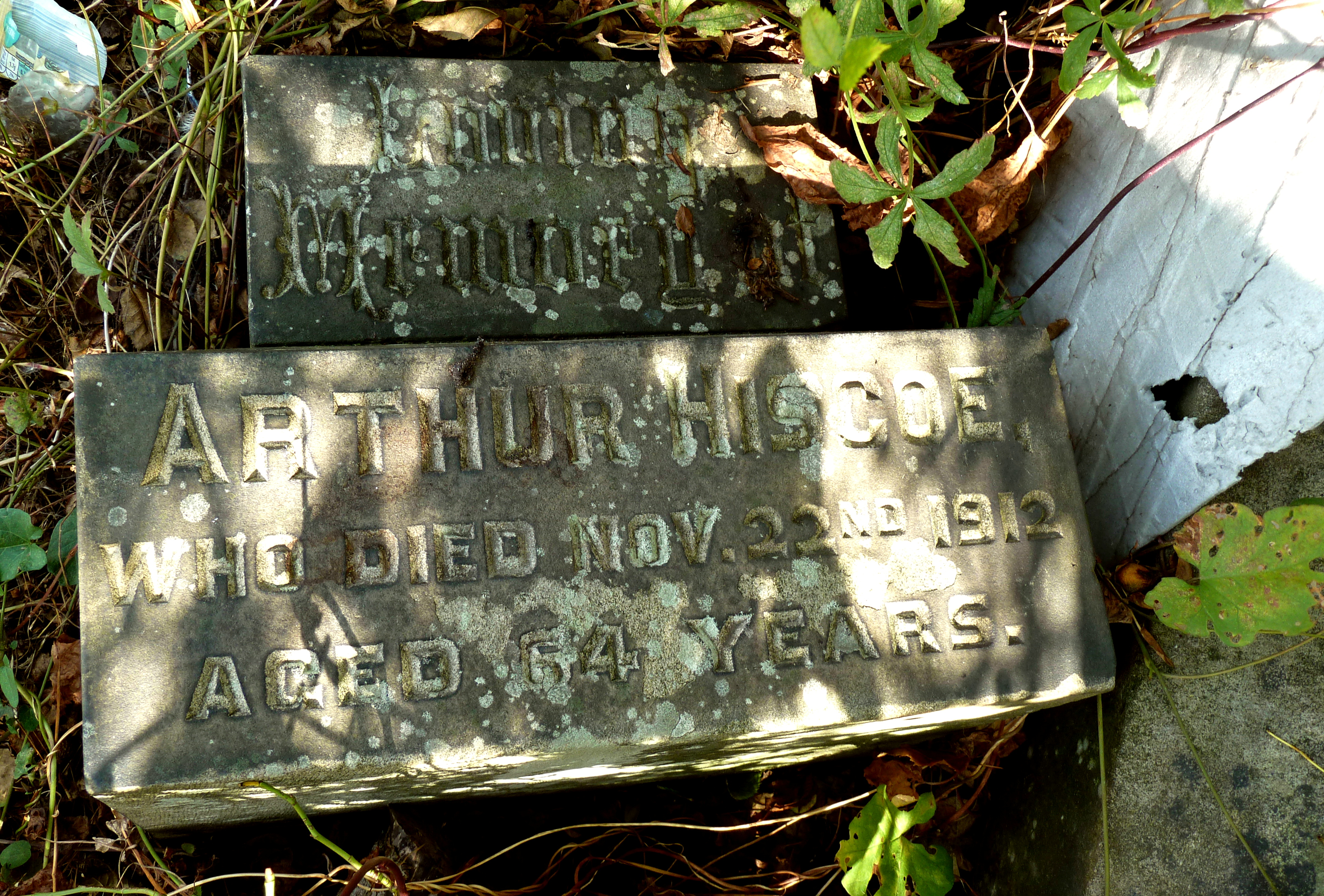
Hiscoe's gravestone in Holbeck Cemetery, broken up and lying under a bush, in 2026

By 1906 Hiscoe's alcohol issues were affecting his life. He was sentenced to seven days' hard labour at HM Prison Wakefield and fined for drunkenness on 4 February 1906. He was described at his committal as one who was educated up to standard 4, 57 years old, and 5 ft 1.5in (156.21 cm) tall, with "brown hair going grey". He continued to work until at least August 1912, when he designed alterations to one house and conversions of a second building into a house for Norman Elliott at Flanshaw Lane, Leeds. He died at his home at 1 West View, Beeston Hill, Leeds, (Note: 1 West View, Beeston Hill, Leeds, was demolished shortly after 1964. See 1964 image here. No. 1 is second from left in the picture. (The house on the extreme left is a corner house in the next road. The houses in the middle and right are numbers 3 and 5 West View).) on 22 November 1912. (Note: Arthur Hiscoe died at 1 West View, Beeston, Leeds. The death certificate says: "Twenty-second November 1912, 1 West View, Holbeck, Leeds. Arthur Hiscoe, 64 years, an architect, alcoholic poisoning and asphyxia due to the filling up of lungs with vomited material. Certificate received from C. Haleshaw coroner for Leeds, inquest held 25th November 1912". Note: under the Births and Deaths Registration Act 1953, section 34, certified copies of bmd entries carrying the General Register Office seal are evidence of the birth or death to which they relate. For verification, anyone can purchase such a certified copy of the certificate from the General Record Office. The above quotation is taken from the certified death certificate. Hiscoe was buried in Holbeck Cemetery. plot no.11953.) The inquest into his death was held on 25 November 1912.

According to the evidence, Hiscoe was brought home on Friday [22 November] by two unknown men, who left him lying on the garden path, where he was found by members of his family, and taken inside the house. Medical assistance was immediately summoned, but death took place before the arrival of the doctor. Hiscoe had an abrasion on his face ... Dr Rock ... said that when he was called in, the deceased smelled strongly of spirits. Death was due to suffocation and to alcoholic poisoning ... The Coroner pointed out that [Hiscoe] had evidently [been] laid down on the hearthrug in such a way as to induce suffocation, which showed that the family had not known what to do in the circumstances. Leeds Mercury, 26 November 1912.

The coroner concluded that as the two men brought him home, "the gate flew open and [Hiscoe] fell on his face", causing bruising, and the two men withheld their names, fearing blame for that injury. Hiscoe's wife asserted that Hiscoe "had many times been brought home drugged", but the coroner dismissed the idea of drugging. The jury concurred with the medical evidence, and said that "no blame [was] attached to any one". The coroner found that Hiscoe had died of alcoholic poisoning.
