= Oakwood Park =

Oakwood Park may refer to:

- Oakwood Park, Enfield, a park located in Oakwood, London, United Kingdom
- Oakwood Park, Missouri
- Oakwood Theme Park, Pembrokeshire
- Flitch Green, Essex, England (formerly known as Oakwood Park)
