= Victoria Shopping Centre =

Shopping centre in Harrogate, North Yorkshire, England

Coordinates: 53.993°N 1.539°W

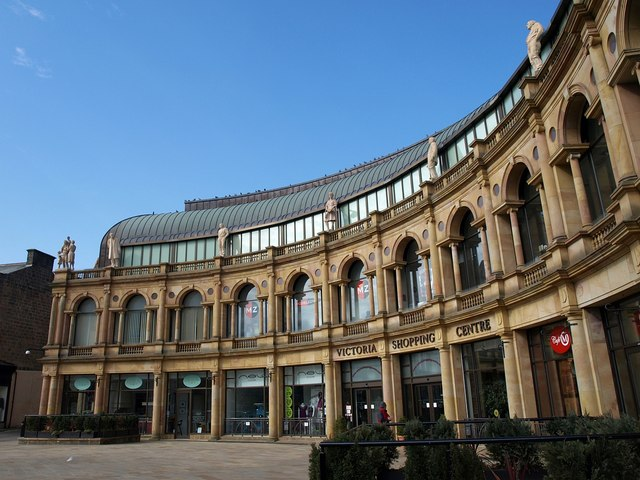
The centre, in 2009

The Victoria Shopping Centre is an indoor shopping centre, in the town centre of Harrogate, in England.

The centre replaced the town's indoor market, which dated from 1938. A competition was held to design the replacement centre, which was won by Cullearn and Philips with a concept inspired by the Basilica Palladiana. It was completed in 1991. The building was sold for £23 million in 1998, and was altered the following year. The southern piazza was filled in, the southern ground floor arcade covered over, and the top floor retail space extended into an area formerly occupied by a terrace cafe. The freehold was later purchased by Harrogate Borough Council. In 2023, the council put it up for sale for £6 million. At the time, tenants included Sports Direct, Next and TK Maxx.

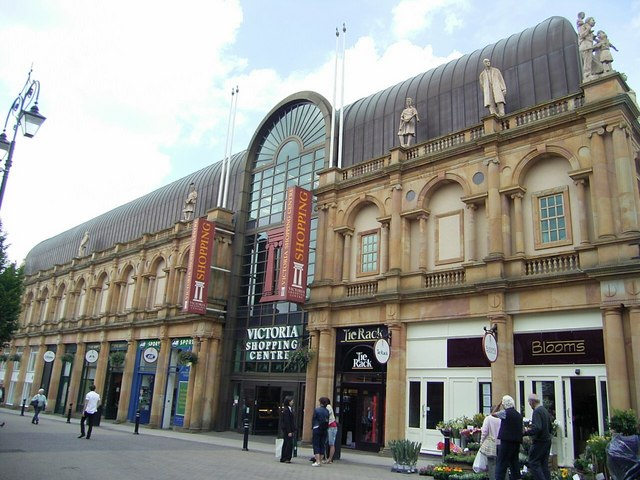
Rear entrance, in 2007

The building's facades are in the neoclassical style. It is built of sandstone, with a green copper roof. There are statues on the roofline; they were originally intended to depict classical subjects, but ultimately, contemporary subjects were selected.
