= Samuel Sugden (merchant) =

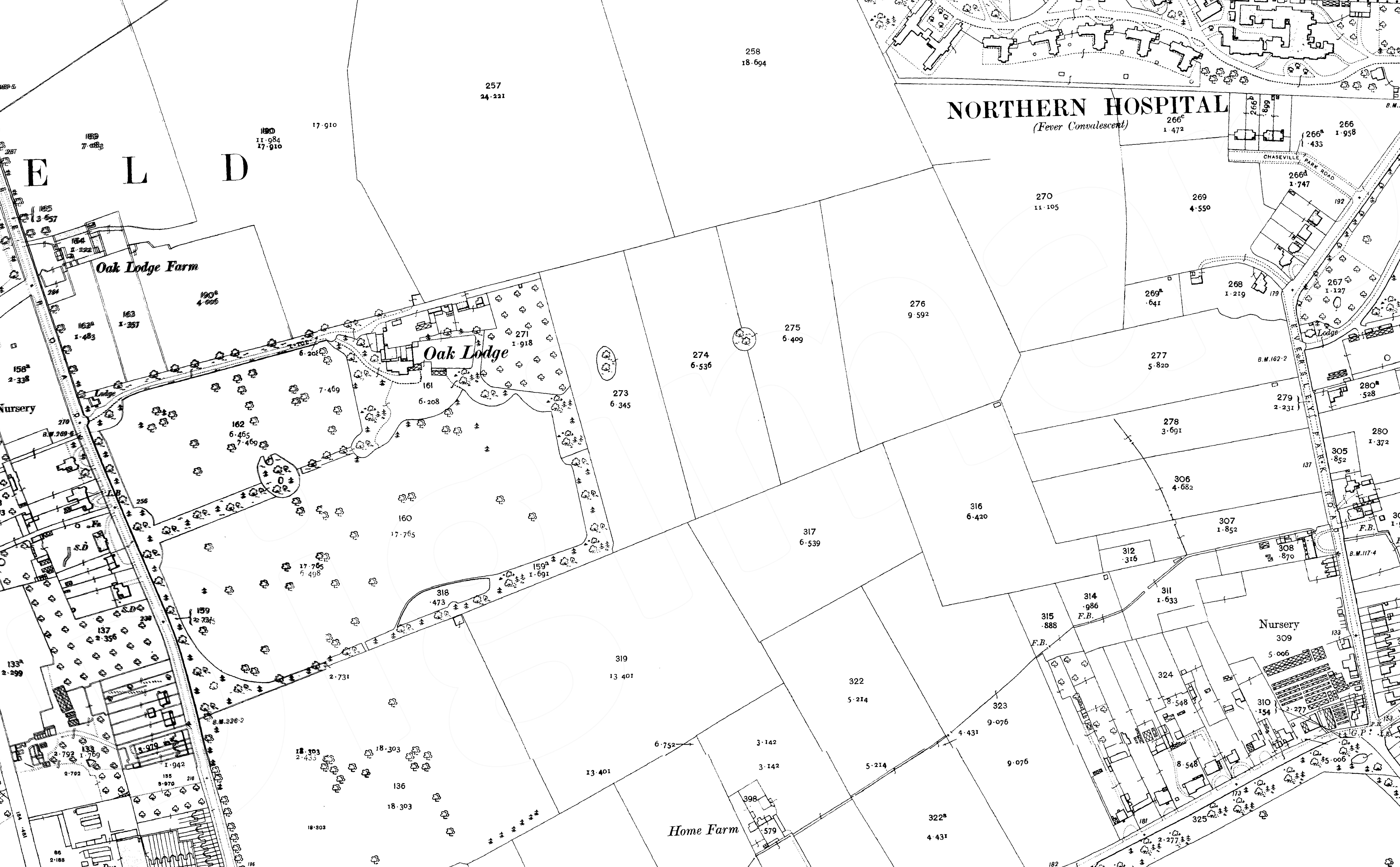
Samuel Sugden's Oak Lodge house and estate on a 1910s Ordnance Survey map.

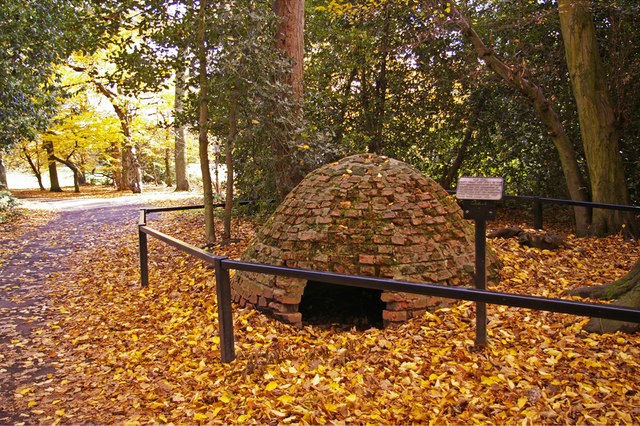
Samuel Sugden's ice well in Oakwood Park.

Samuel Sugden (16 April 1798 – 12 October 1896) was an English merchant from Leeds who built Oak Lodge in north London, after which the district of Oakwood is named.

== Early life and family ==
Samuel Sugden was born on 16 April 1798 in Leeds, Yorkshire. At the time of his birth, his father, Samuel Sugden (the elder) was living on Park Lane, Leeds. In 1819 Samuel (the younger) married Elizabeth Morse and they had seven children. Only three survived. Elizabeth Morse died in 1843. In 1848, Samuel married Emma Elizabeth Linsell (died 1874) at the Weld Chapel, Southgate. They had daughters, Elizabeth, Emily, Emma, Annie, Clara, and Florence, and sons Charles, Henry, Albert and Edwin. In 1851 the family lived at Oakfield Villa in Crouch End. From at least as early as 1855, they were at Oak Lodge, Southgate, where they lived until Samuel's death.

His wife Emma died in 1874 and is remembered in a 3-light window in the Lady Chapel at St Paul's Church, Winchmore Hill. His daughter Annie, who died in 1939, also has a window to her memory in the chapel.

== Career ==
In both the 1851 and 1861 censuses, Sugden's occupation was recorded as "warehouseman". This was a term widely used to describe those who owned, managed or worked in a warehouse. He was able to support a large family with four servants and in 1861 employed a governess. So he was clearly financially very comfortable by this point. In 1857, he established Sugden, Son and Nephew at Aldermanbury in the City. The company dealt in fur, feathers and artificial flowers, probably related to clothes manufacture. The firm had run for the previous ten years as Sugden Borras & co. At the time of the 1871 census he was described as a "Merchant of Feathers at Aldermanbury".

In the late 1860s he purchased a farm and farmhouse on land that was formerly part of Enfield Chase, the royal hunting ground. An Oak Farm is mentioned on an 1822 Ordnance Survey map in that location. Using the services of local builder John Wilkinson, whose office was near the Cherry Tree pub in Southgate, he rebuilt the house into a much more substantial residence known as Oak Lodge with a walled garden, orchard, ice well, and a collection of outbuildings. He made his own gas in an outbuilding at the lodge and a gasometer is shown on contemporary Ordnance Survey maps.

He ran Chase Farm in Chase Road, approximately where the modern Merrivale road is, that was later known as Oak Lodge Farm.

== Death and legacy ==
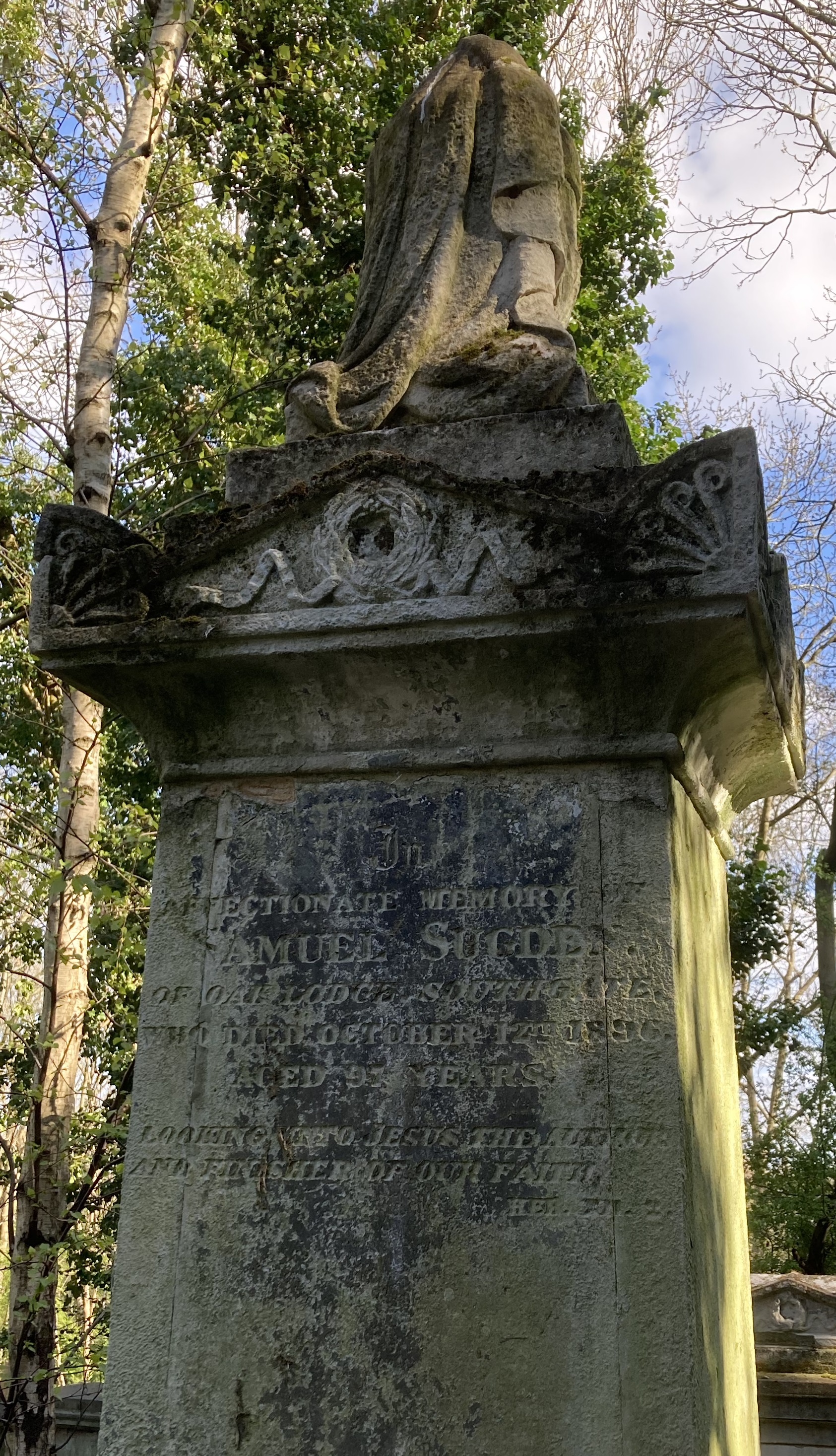
Grave of Samuel Sugden in Highgate Cemetery

Sugden died on 12 October 1896, aged 97, leaving his estate to trustees. By that time he was known as Samuel Sugden the elder. Probate was granted in London to "Samuel Sugden gentleman, Charles Alfred Sugden merchant and Charles Eustace-Wilson gentleman" on an estate of £140,034, resworn in 1898 in the amount of £139,005. Charles Alfred Sugden was Samuel's son from his second marriage, Charles Eustace-Wilson was a solicitor, and the living Samuel Sugden was his son from his first marriage. In July 1897, Oak Lodge was advertised for sale by auction in The Times. He is buried on the west side of Highgate Cemetery.

Oak Lodge and its outbuildings were demolished just after the end of the First World War and in 1927 Southgate Urban District Council purchased 50 acres from Sugden's executors which it combined with 8.5 acres it purchased from the Vicar of Enfield to form Oakwood Park. Sugden's ice well still exists in the park.
