= Oakwood Park, Enfield =

Coordinates: 51.641°N 0.121°W

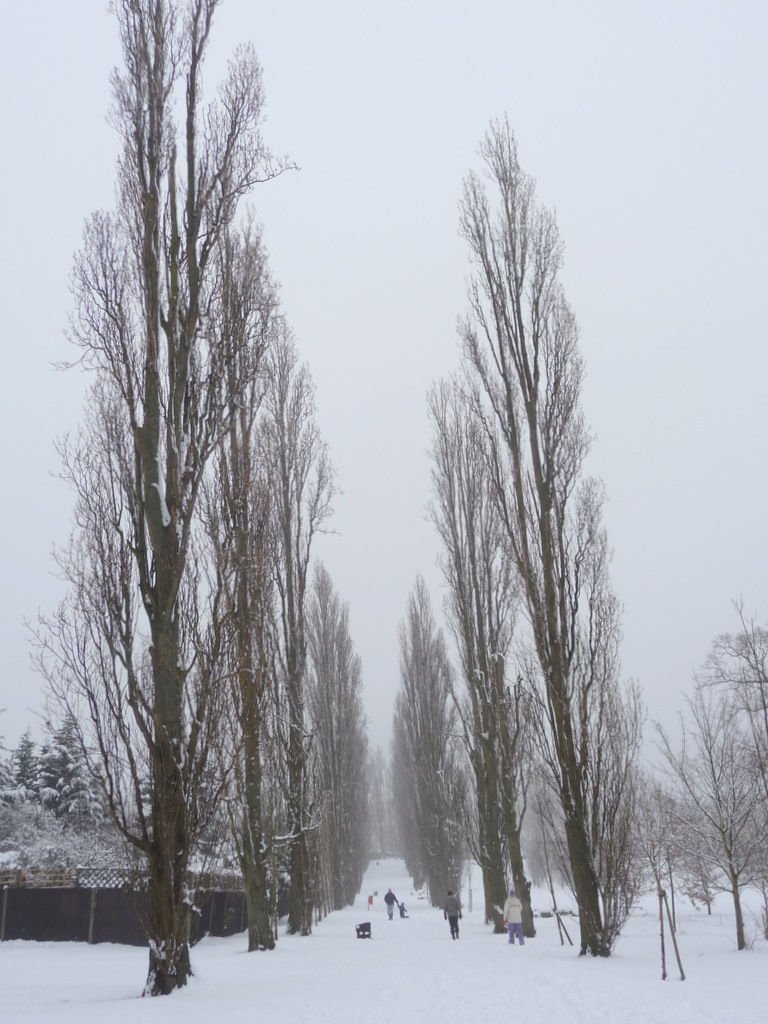
The park in February 2012

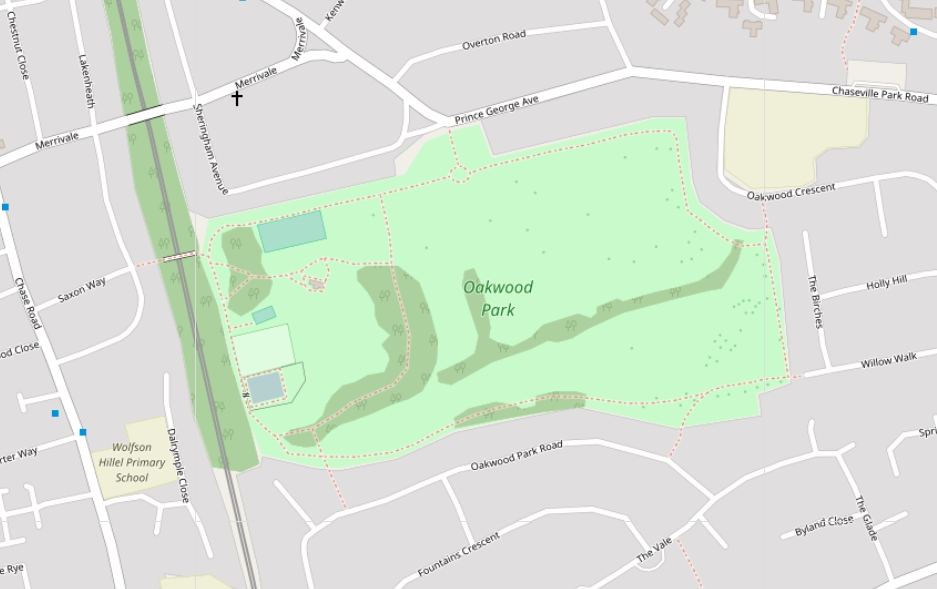
Oakwood Park area map

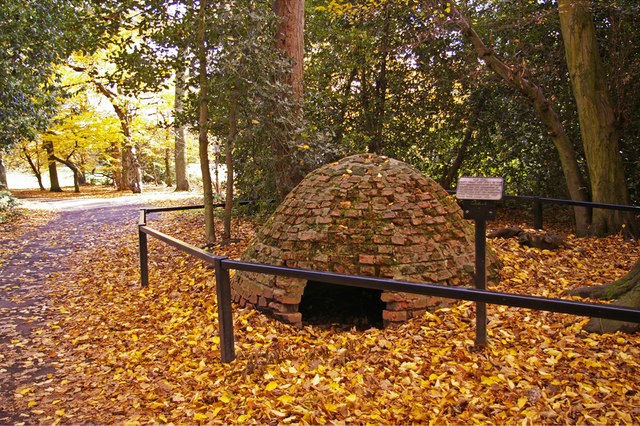
Samuel Sugden's ice well in Oakwood Park

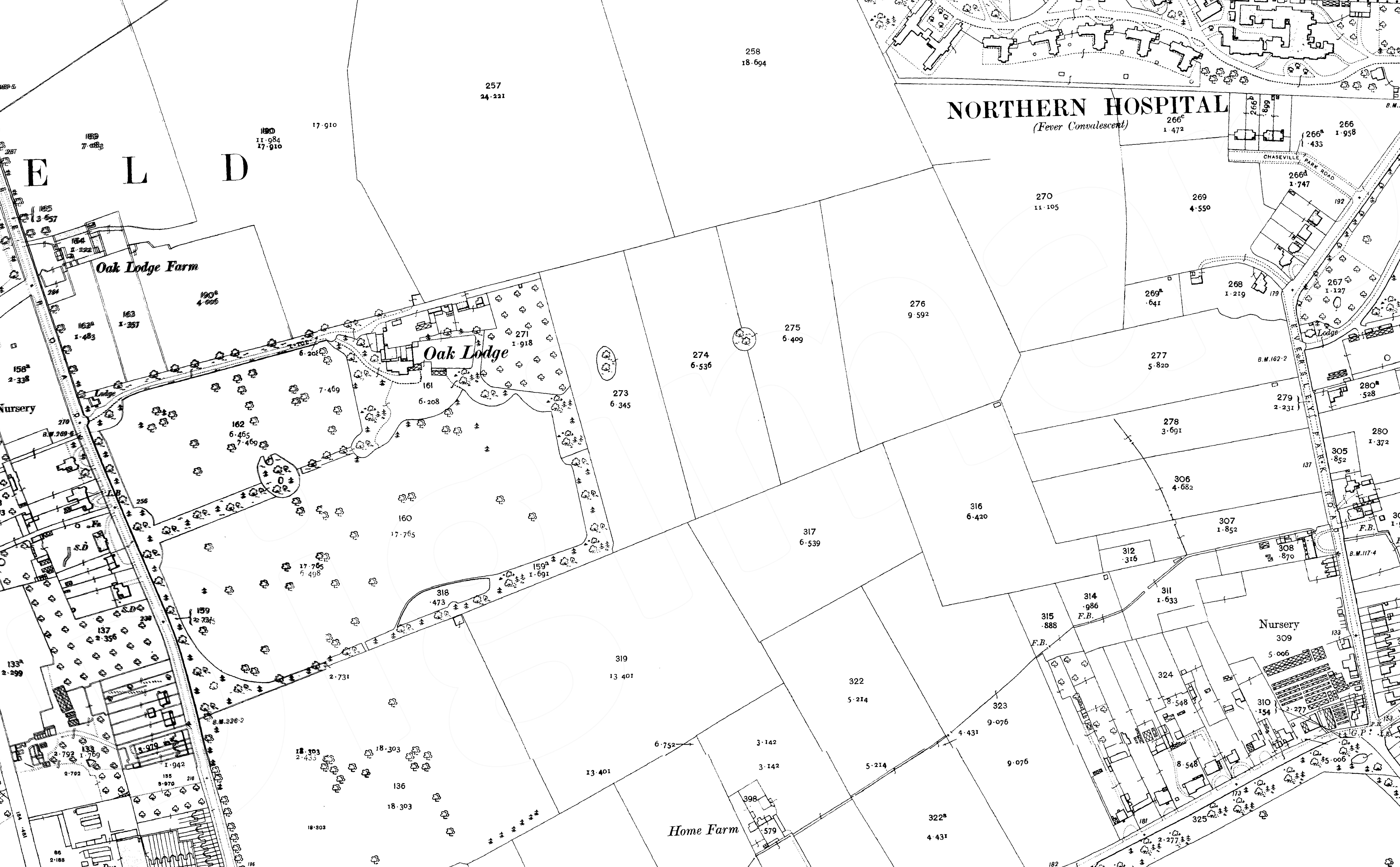
Samuel Sugden's Oak Lodge house and estate on a 1910s Ordnance Survey map.

Oakwood Park is a public park in Oakwood, in the London Borough of Enfield, on land that was formerly part of Enfield Chase. It opened in 1929 and comprises 64 acres of land. It is notable for its commemorative avenue of poplar trees, an avenue of scarlet oaks planted by mayors of Enfield, and an ice well that was built by Samuel Sugden, on whose estate of Oak Lodge the park was largely built and after which it was named.

== Location ==
Oakwood Park is located immediately to the east of the Piccadilly Line between Oakwood and Southgate stations. There are entrances from Saxon Way, Prince George Avenue, Oakwood Crescent, Willow Walk, Oakwood Avenue and Oakwood Park Road.

== Creation ==
The park is on land that was formerly part of Enfield Chase, a royal hunting ground. The Chase was enclosed in 1777 and subsequently divided between the King and the freeholders of the neighbouring parishes with the land now occupied by the park allocated to Edmonton parish, of which Southgate was then a part.

In the late 1860s, the merchant Samuel Sugden (c.1800-1896) purchased a farm and farmhouse in the area, probably the one marked on an 1822 Ordnance Survey map as Oak Farm. He rebuilt the house into a much more substantial residence known as Oak Lodge with a walled garden, orchard, ice well, and a collection of outbuildings. The Lodge and outbuildings were demolished just after the end of the First World War and in 1927 Southgate Urban District Council purchased 50 acres from Sugden's estate which it combined with 8.5 acres it purchased from the Vicar of Enfield to form Oakwood Park. The park opened in 1929 and after further adjustments caused by the construction of the Piccadilly Line northern extension (1932) now comprises 64 acres of land. The ice well still exists as do some of the original field boundaries dating from Sugden's time.

== Features ==
The park features a grove of poplar trees planted to mark the coronation of King George VI and an avenue of scarlet oak trees which was planted by successive mayors of the Borough of Enfield since 1945.

As with other parks of the time, such as that were The Chickenshed Theatre in Cockfosters now stands, there was an aviary. Some paving can be found among trees where it probably once stood, when leaf litter is brushed away. It was vandalised in around the 70's or 80's and some of the birds were killed, the aviary was removed and not replaced. A surface WW2 air raid shelter, brick built with concrete slab roof survives. Both of these located just south of the tennis courts.

There is a tea room or cafe.

== Gallery ==
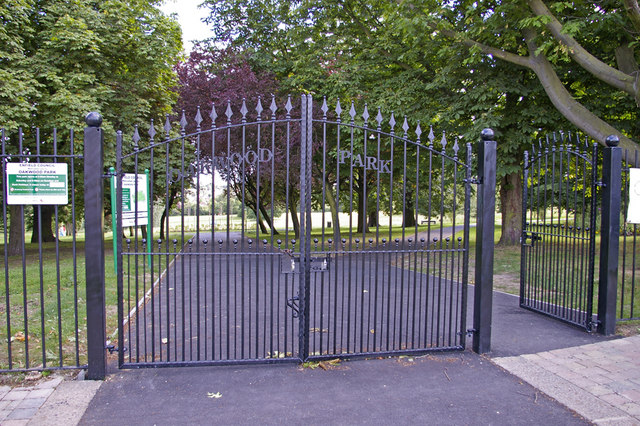
Entrance from Prince George Avenue

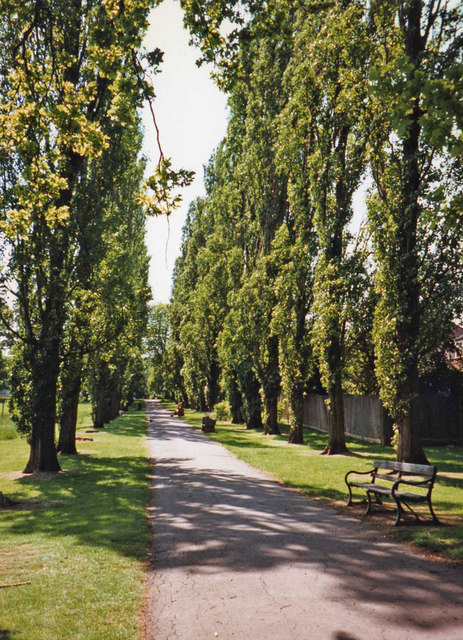
Avenue of poplar trees

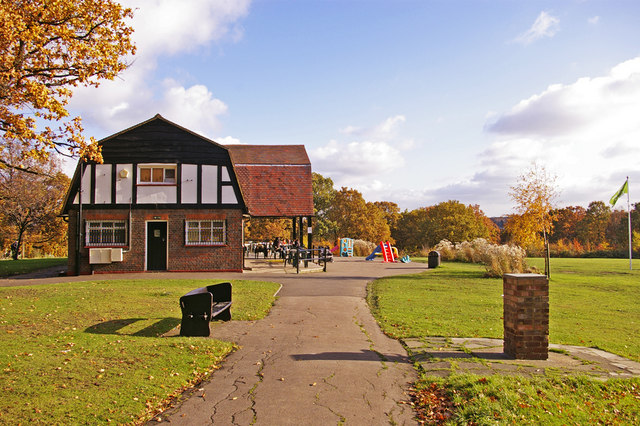
Tea room

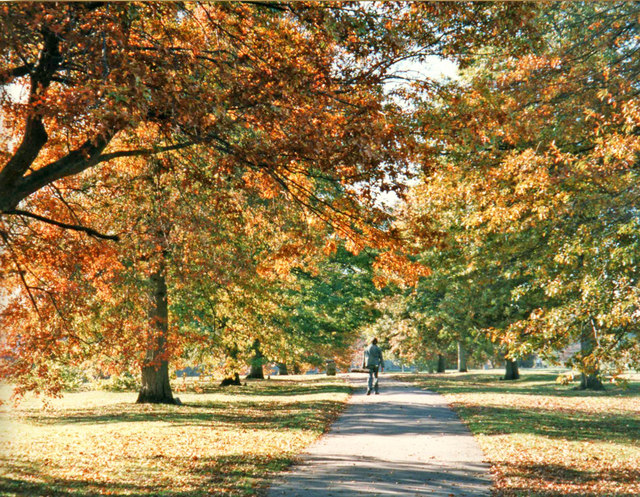
Avenue of scarlet oaks

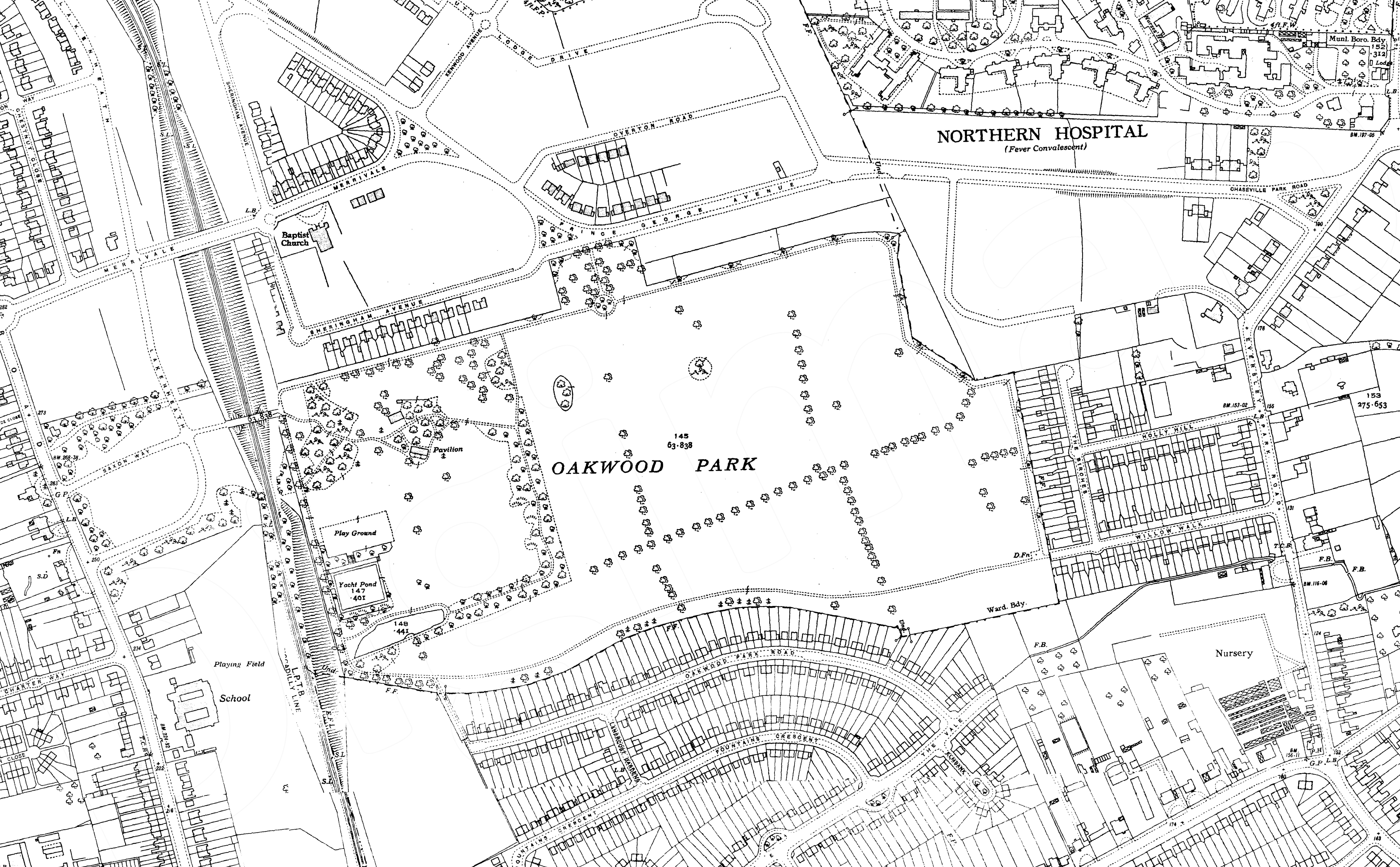
Oakwood Park on a 1930s Ordnance Survey map, not long after it was laid out
