= David Hechstetter =

18th-century British businessman

- Born: c. 1659
- Died: 14 June 1721 (aged 61–62)
- Occupation: Merchant
- Board member of: Company of Merchant Adventurers of London (the Hamburg Company)

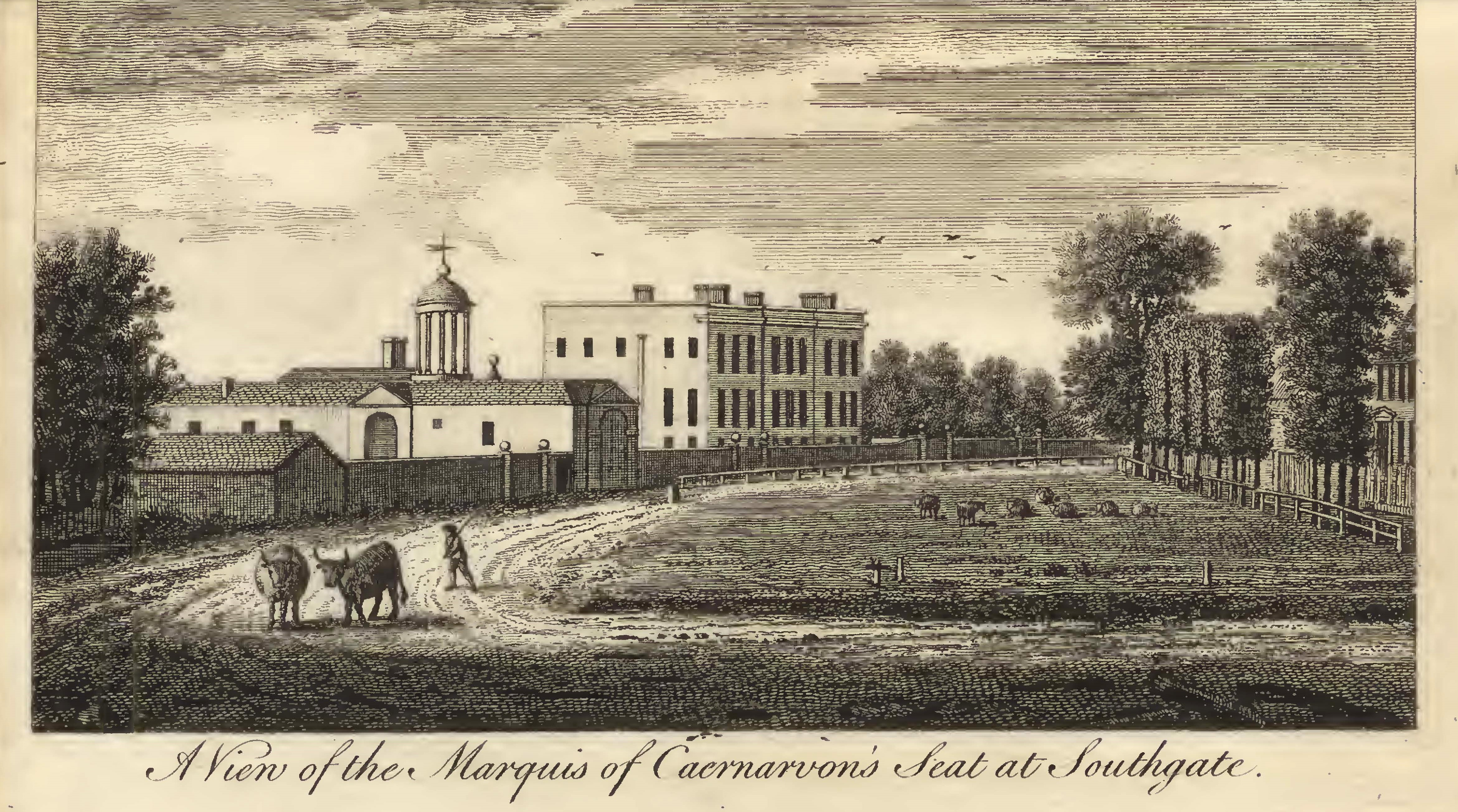
Minchington Hall shown in A View of the Marquis of Caernarvon's Seat at Southgate from Robert Goadby's A New Display of the Beauties of England (1776).

Sir David Hechstetter (or Heckstetter, Hetchetter, Hochstetter, or Hockstetter; c. 1659 – 14 June 1721) was a director of the Company of Merchant Adventurers of London (the Hamburg Company) and a land-owner in Hertfordshire and Middlesex. He was a justice of the peace for Middlesex and was knighted in 1714.

== Early life ==
David Hechstetter was born around 1659. His place of birth is unknown. According to John Burke, he changed his name from Hockstetter (see Höchstetter) to Hechstetter and his family were accorded great honour in Germany by Emperor Maximilian of the Holy Roman Empire.

== Career ==
David Hechstetter was a director of the Company of Merchant Adventurers of London (the Hamburg Company). He was an investor in the Bank, the old East India Company, and the South Sea Company in which he had four votes. In 1704, he acquired land at Dancers Hill in Hertfordshire from Thomas Andrews on which the current Dancers Hill House was built around 1750–60.

He was a justice of the peace for Middlesex and was knighted in 1714. He resided at Minchington Hall in Southgate, Middlesex, as lessee from 1714 and purchased land that was part of the Minchington estate from Sir Nicholas Wolstenholme in 1716.

== Family ==
Hechstetter married Mary Watkinson in Leeds in 1696 and they had four children. Mary (bapt. 1697 Walthamstow). David, who succeeded him (bapt. 1699 Walthamstow - 1757). Christopher, (bapt. 1701 Walthamstow), and Anne (bapt. 1703 Southgate). His daughter Mary's son was David Michel (c. 1735 – 1805), the member of Parliament for Lyme Regis in the 1780s.

Hechstetter's wife was treated by the naturalist and physician Martin Lister when she fell ill and Hechstetter wrote to Lister in 1699 when she recovered.

== Death and legacy ==
Hechstetter died on 14 June 1721. His 1720 will is held by the British National Archives at Kew and left his estate principally to his wife, Dame Mary Hechstetter, and their children, with legacies of £200 to Christchurch Hospital and £300 to his cousin John Lister. He directed that his body be buried in the vault of the chapel of St Arnold's without any "pompous ostentation".

A marble memorial to Hechstetter stood in the nave of the Weld Chapel, Southgate. It was removed to Christ Church, Southgate, when the chapel was demolished in the mid-nineteenth century. It includes Hechstetter's coat of arms.
