= John Wolstenholme (disambiguation) =

John Wolstenholme is an English cricketer.

John Wolstenholme may also refer to:

- John Wolstenholme (merchant) (1562–1639)
- Sir John Wolstenholme, 1st Baronet (c. 1596–1670)
- Sir John Wolstenholme, 3rd Baronet (1649–1709), MP for Middlesex (UK Parliament constituency)
- Jack Wolstenholme (1851–1914), New Zealand cricketer
- John Wolstenholme (footballer) (1880-1938), English footballer, see List of Bury F.C. players (1–24 appearances)
