= Sir Nicholas Wolstenholme, 4th Baronet =

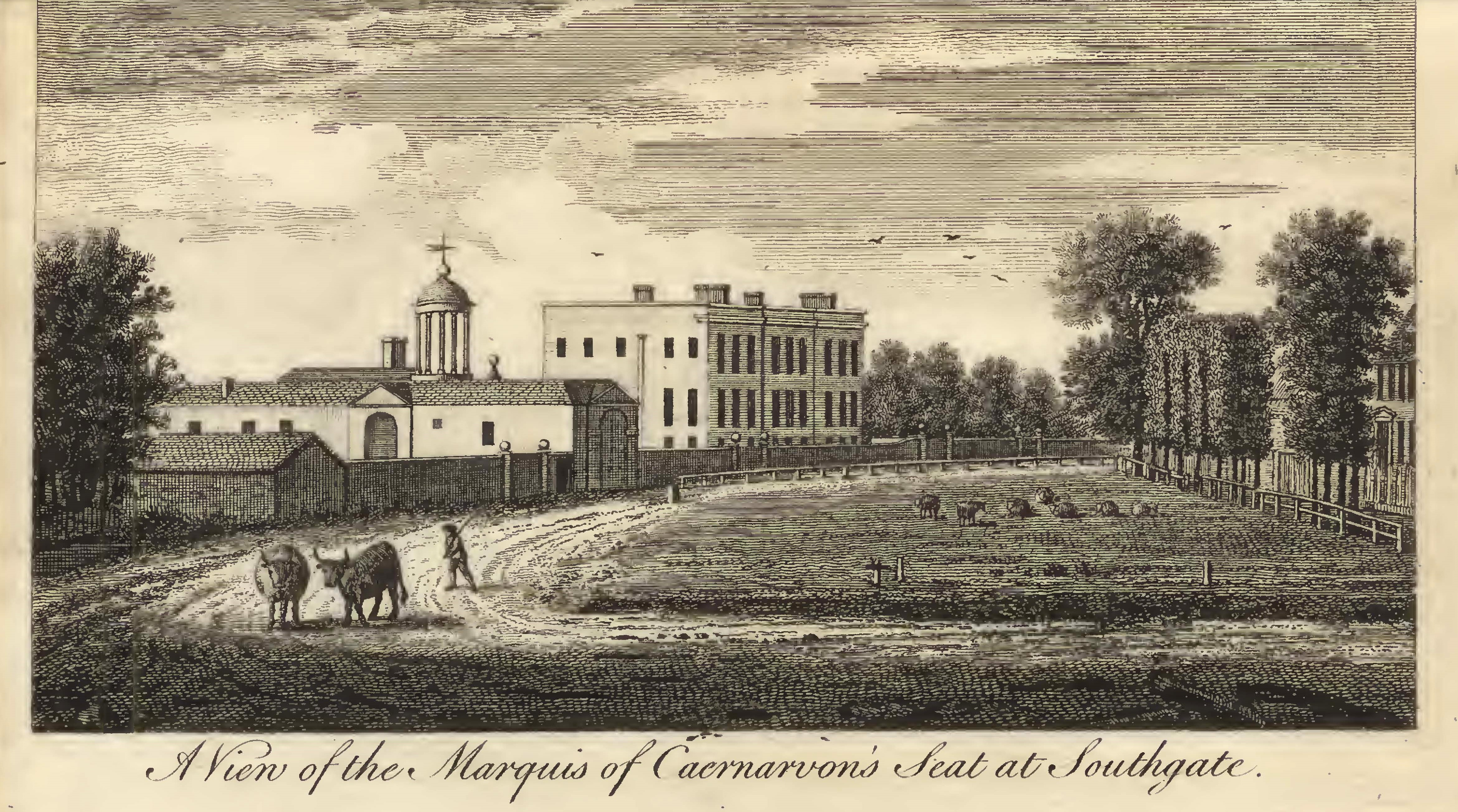
Minchington Hall as it appeared around 1776 in Robert Goadby's A New Display of the Beauties of England (1776).

Sir Nicholas Wolstenholme, 4th Baronet (1676–1717) was an English baronet and land-owner in Middlesex. He was the son of Sir John Wolstenholme, 3rd Baronet, a member of Parliament for Middlesex.

He was heavily in debt for much of his adult life: his estate was in the hands of trustees, and he was incarcerated in the Fleet Prison. He married Grace Waldo, daughter of Sir Edward Waldo and his third wife Elizabeth Shuckburgh. They had no children. After his death, she remarried William Ferdinand Cary, 8th Baron Hundson. They had no children and the title became extinct upon his death. Grace died in 1729 aged about 46.

The Wolstenholme family originally acquired wealth and social position in Middlesex through service in the customs office. The second baronet built Minchington Hall in Southgate, Middlesex, after 1664.

In 1716, the 4th baronet sold part of the Minchington estate to Sir David Hechstetter.

== See also ==
- Wolstenholme baronets

Baronetage of England
Preceded by John Wolstenholme	Baronet (of London); 1709–1717	Succeeded by William Wolstenholme
