= Minchenden Oak Garden =

Public park in Southgate, London, England

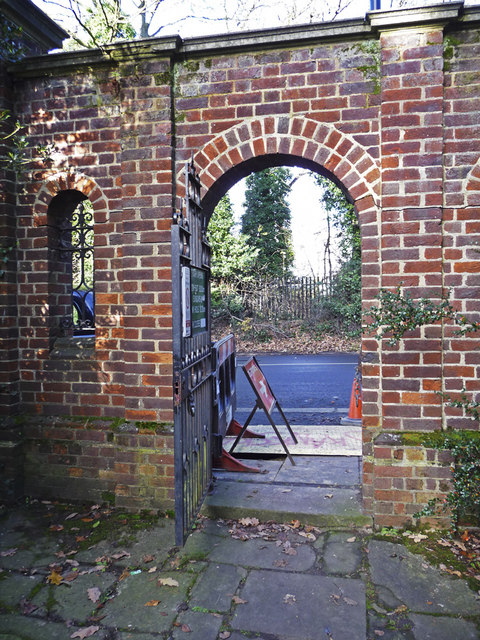
- Entrance, looking out towards Waterfall Road

- Location within Greater London
- Type: Public park
- Location: Southgate, London
- Coordinates: 51.6243°N 0.1291°W
- Created: 12 May 1934
- Operator: London Borough of Enfield
- Status: Open daily

Minchenden Oak Garden is a public park in Southgate, London owned by the London Borough of Enfield.

It was formerly part of the estate of Minchenden House, demolished in 1853, and opened as a garden of remembrance in 1934. The park is just 0.17 hectares (2,000 yd^{2}) in size and is accessed by a gate from Waterfall Road. A key feature of the park is the Minchenden Oak, an 800-year-old tree that is one of the oldest in London. The canopy of the tree was described as the largest in England in 1873.

== History ==
Minchenden House (also known as Minchington Hall), a large brick structure, was built by John Nicholl in 1741 on part of Sir John Weld's former estate of Arnos Grove. Nicholl died shortly after completing the house and it was inherited by his daughter Margaret. She married James Brydges, Marquis of Carnarvon who later became the third Duke of Chandos. Minchenden served as their country house (the main estate being Cannons in Little Stanmore).

Chandos died childless and the estate passed to the Marquis of Buckingham, it was left to deteriorate and the house was demolished in 1853. It was replaced by a smaller building, Minchenden Lodge (which still stands), and the estate, together with that of Beaver Hall, which once extended to 300 acres (120 ha) was rejoined to Arnos Grove.

== Minchenden Oak Garden ==
A surviving portion of the original Minchenden House estate was redeveloped by the local authority (the Municipal Borough of Southgate which is now the London Borough of Enfield) into a remembrance garden. The 0.17 hectares (2,000 yd^{2}) garden was opened by the Mayor of Southgate and the local vicar on 12 May 1934. The garden contains lawns, hedges, shrubs and trees with flagstone paths and seating; fragments of the former 17th-century Weld Chapel are visible. The garden is entered via an iron gate in a red-brick wall on Waterfall Road, Southgate and is open daily until dusk. It is currently owned by the London Borough of Enfield.

== Minchenden Oak ==
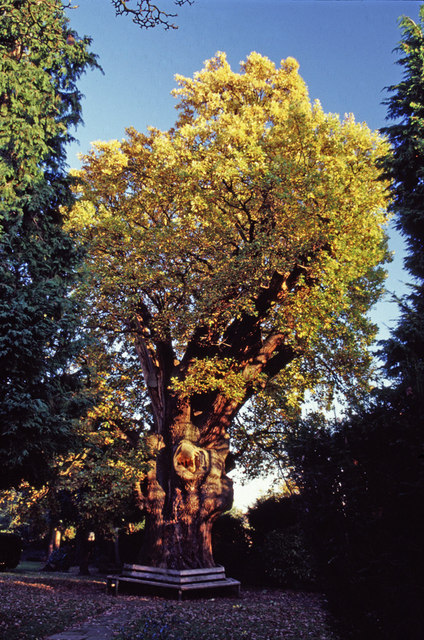
Michenden Oak in 1999

One of the key features of the garden, for which it is named, is the Minchenden Oak. The tree is thought to be 800 years old and a survivor of the ancient Forest of Middlesex. The oak had previously been pollarded for timber, and was already substantial by the time Nicholl's house was built.

Because of its association with the estate it became known as the Chandos Oak and was featured in Jacob George Strutt's 1826 Sylva Britannica, by which time it measured 15 feet 9 inches (4.80 m) in girth at a height of 3 feet (0.91 m) off the ground. In 1873 Edward Walford described it as having the largest canopy of any tree in England at 126 feet (38 m) in diameter and "still growing". It lost two limbs to a gale in 1899 but by the following year still boasted a canopy of 136 feet (41 m) in spread; its girth was measured at 21 feet 3 inches (6.48 m).

Minchenden Grammar School was renamed after the tree in 1924 and featured it on their school badge.

In 1971, some of the oak's major branches were trimmed, but Country Life magazine described the tree afterwards as still being "magnificent". It was found to have a cracked trunk and internal decay in 2013, and was then described as being "perilously close to death". Works were quickly carried out to reduce the load on the trunk by removing 6 tonnes (6.6 short tons) from the crown and the tree was treated with beneficial fungi. The timber created from the pruning was slated for noticeboards and seating for the garden.

A renovation of the gardens followed, which included the planting of a sapling grown from an acorn of the oak. The gardens reopened in May 2015 at a formal ceremony presided over by Richard Chartres, Bishop of London.
