= Joseph Thornton =

Joseph Thornton may refer to:

- Joseph Thornton (bookseller) (1808–1891), founder of Thornton's Bookshop in Oxford, England
- Joseph William Thornton, founder of the British chocolate brand Thorntons
- Joseph Thornton (biologist) (born 1965), American evolutionary biologist
- Joseph Thornton (contractor) (1804–1889), railway contractor in England
- Joe Thornton (born 1979), Canadian ice hockey centre
- Joe Thornton (archer), Cherokee archer
