= Sir John Wolstenholme, 3rd Baronet =

Sir John Wolstenholme, 3rd Baronet (1649–1709), of Forty Hall, Enfield, and Denmark Street, St. Giles-in-the-Fields, Middlesex, was an English landowner and Whig politician who sat in the English and British House of Commons between 1695 and 1709.

== Early life ==
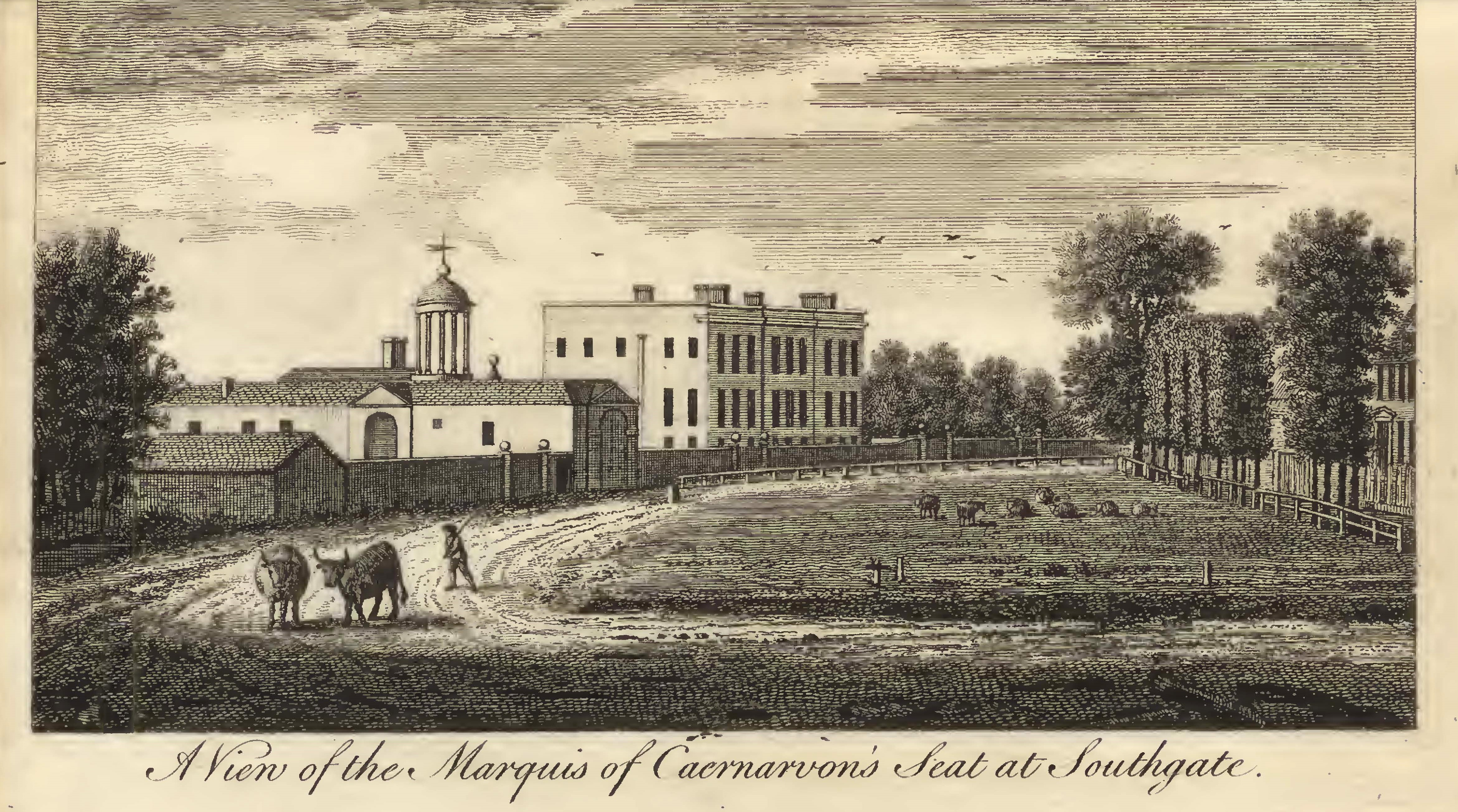
Minchington Hall as it appeared around 1776 in Robert Goadby's A New Display of the Beauties of England (1776).

Wolstenholme was baptized on 19 October 1649, the eldest son of Sir Thomas Wolstenholme, 2nd Baronet, of Minchendon, Edmonton, Middlesex, and his wife, Elizabeth Andrews, daughter of Phineas Andrews of St Olave's, Hart Street, London.

The Wolstenholme family acquired wealth and social position in Middlesex through service in the customs office. The second baronet built Minchington Hall in Southgate, Middlesex, after 1664.

Wolstenholme was admitted at Trinity College, Cambridge in 1665, and at Inner Temple in 1668. He married on 27 May 1675, aged 25, Mary Raynton (died 1691), daughter of Nicholas Raynton, MP, of Forty Hall, Enfield, when he had £2,000 pa in lands settled on him by his father.

However, his father's financial circumstances worsened. In 1690, the younger Wolstenholme had to petition Parliament for a bill to allow him to sell property to pay his father's debts. A year later, in November 1691, he succeeded his father in the baronetcy and to the encumbered property.

== Career ==
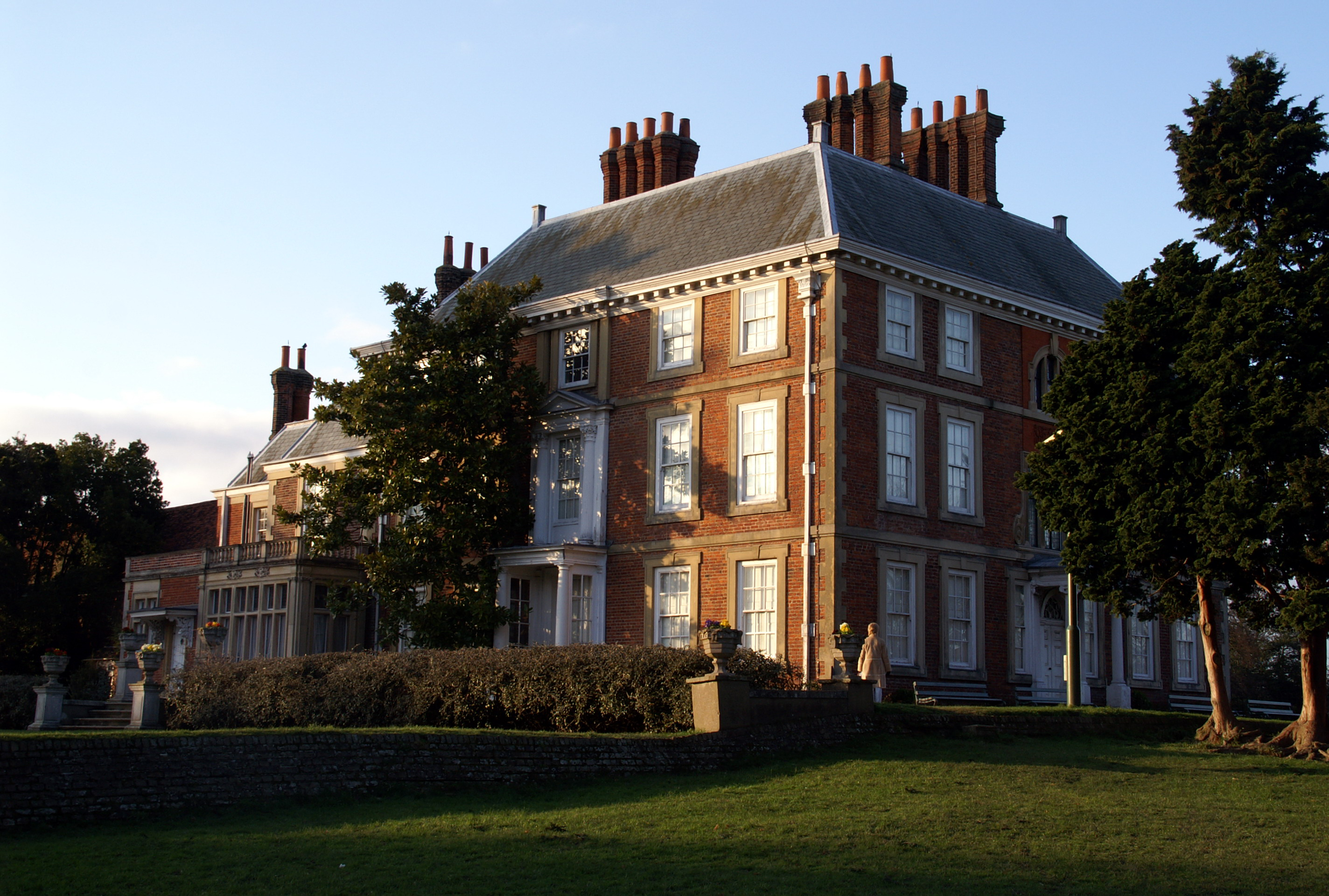
Forty Hall from the South East

Wolstenholme was returned as Member of Parliament for Middlesex at the 1695 English general election. He signed the Association, and voted to fix the price of guineas at 22 shillings in March 1696. He was active in promoting local issues in Parliament. In 1696, he succeeded to his father-in-law's estate at Forty Hall. Though this inheritance helped his financial situation, he was still in difficulties and was keen to recover nearly £10,000 in arrears owed by the crown from a patent granted to his father by Charles II as collector for the port of London. He was returned again at the 1698 English general election and reported on a bill to improve river and harbour navigation in May 1698. He became actively engaged in trying to recover the money owed to his father by petitioning both the Treasury and Parliament. He married on 7 February 1700, as his second wife, Temperance Alston, widow of Sir Rowland Alston, 2nd Baronet and daughter of Thomas Crew, 2nd Baron Crew of Stene. He was defeated in the first general election of 1701 and decided not to stand at the second general election of 1701, putting forward his son Nicholas instead.

Wolstenholme next stood for Middlesex at the 1705 English general election and was returned as Whig MP. He voted for the Court candidate for Speaker on 25 October 1705, and supported the ministry over the 'place clause' in the regency bill on 18 February 1706. He was returned unopposed as a Whig at the 1708 British general election and became involved in further efforts to recover money owed him from historical situations. He was rewarded for his persistence when the Lords ruled in his favour on 4 February 1709 after a 70-year battle in the courts, said to have cost his family over £10,000.

== Death and legacy ==
Wolstenholme died in May 1709 leaving four sons and four daughters by his first wife. He was succeeded in the baronetcy by his son Nicholas who was in such straitened circumstances by then that his estates were in the hands of trustees and in 1712 he was incarcerated in the Fleet Prison by his creditors. His daughter Rebecca married Michael Harvey of Combe, Surrey.

Parliament of England
Preceded by Sir Charles Gerard, Bt; Ralph Hawtrey	Member of Parliament for Middlesex; 1695–1700; With: Edward Russell; Sir John Bucknall 1696; Warwick Lake1698	Succeeded by Warwick Lake; Hugh Smithson
Preceded by Warwick Lake; Hugh Smithson	Member of Parliament for Middlesex; 1705–1707; With: Scorie Barker	Succeeded by Parliament of Great Britain
Parliament of Great Britain
Preceded by Parliament of England	Member of Parliament for Middlesex; 1707–1709; With: Scorie Barker	Succeeded by Scorie Barker; John Austen
Baronetage of England
Preceded by Thomas Wolstenholme	Baronet (of London); 1691–1709	Succeeded by Nicholas Wolstenholme
