= Sir Thomas Wolstenholme, 2nd Baronet =

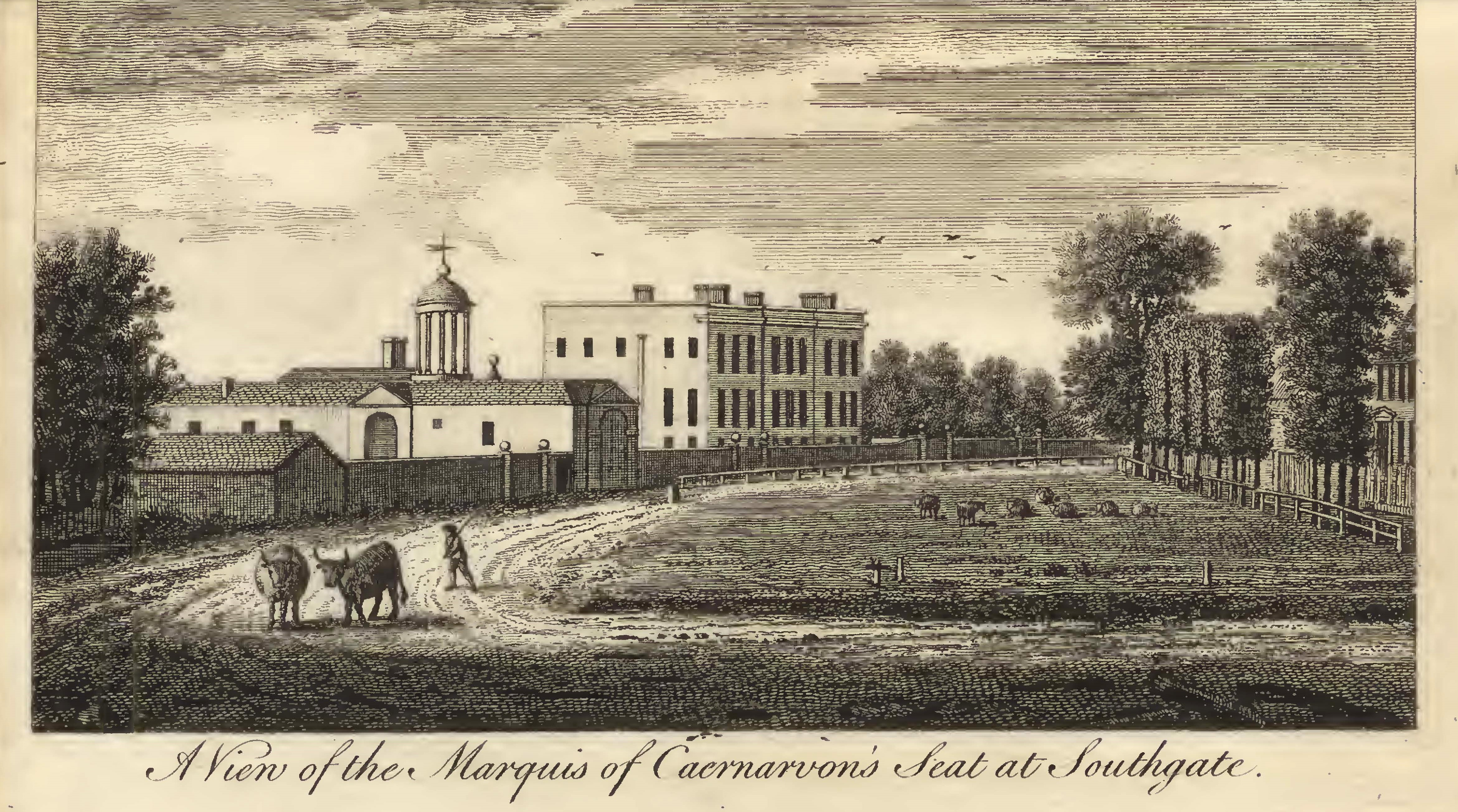
Minchington Hall as it appeared around 1776 in Robert Goadby's A New Display of the Beauties of England (1776).

Sir Thomas Wolstenholme, 2nd Baronet (c. 1622–1691) was an English baronet.

The Wolstenholme family acquired wealth and social position in Middlesex through service in the customs office. The second baronet built Minchington Hall in Southgate, Middlesex, after 1664. In 1672, he was assessed to taxation on 35 hearths, the greatest amount in the parish.

In 1675, he settled £2,000 PA in lands on his son, the future 3rd baronet, when the younger Wolstenholme married into the powerful Raynton family.

By 1690, the 3rd baronet, by then a member of Parliament for Middlesex, petitioned Parliament for a bill to sell several properties to pay the debts of his father, who it was claimed was almost bankrupt.

== See also ==
- Wolstenholme baronets

Baronetage of England
Preceded by John Wolstenholme	Baronet (of London); 1670–1691	Succeeded by John Wolstenholme
