= John Henry Powell Schneider =

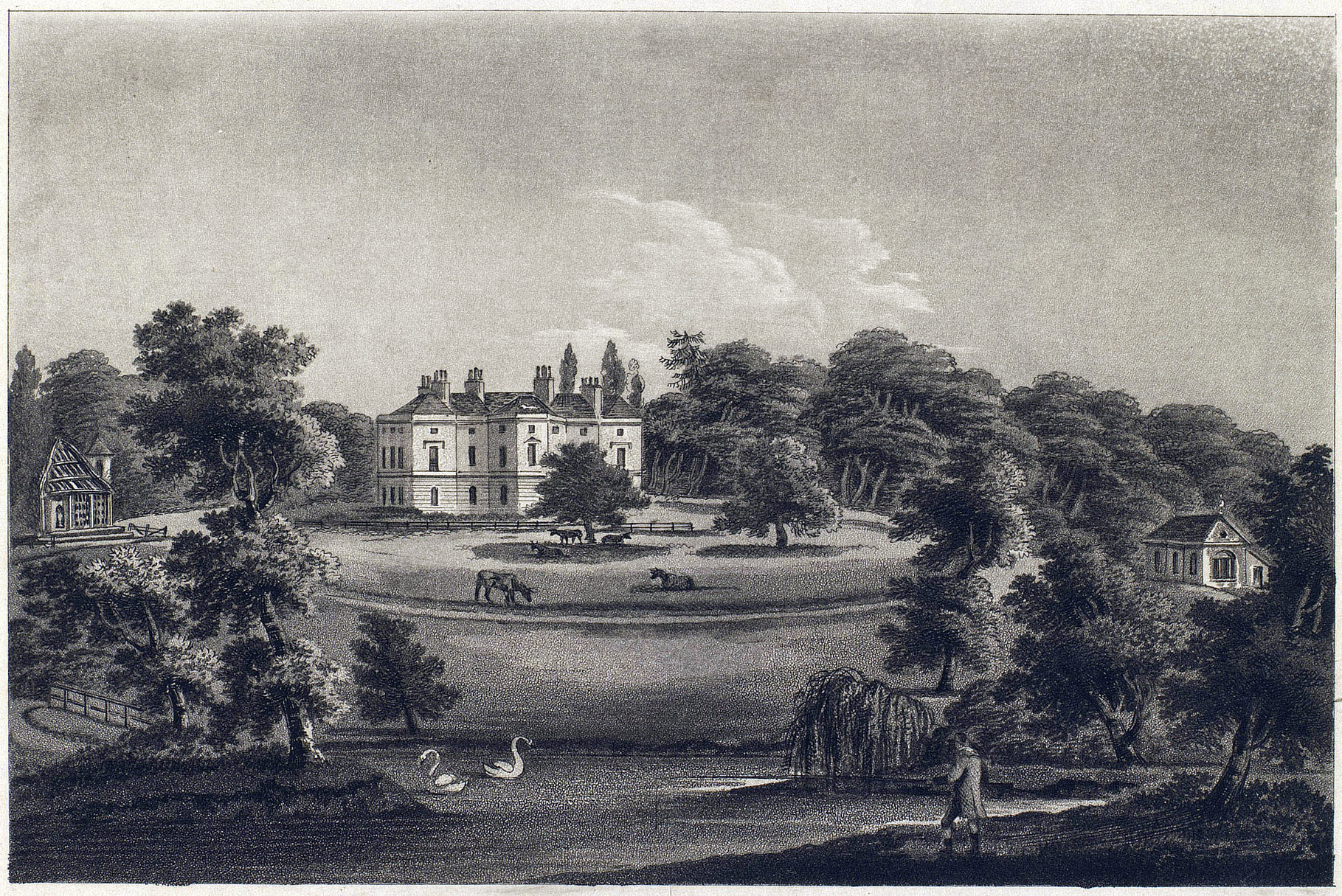
Beaver Hall The Seat of John Locke Esq. Southgate Middlesex. John Hassell, London, 1804.

John Henry Powell Schneider (c. 1768 – 1861) was a merchant in London of Swiss origins.

== Early life and family ==
John Schneider was born around 1768, into a family that had moved to England from Switzerland earlier in the century. He became head of John Schneider & Co., London merchants. He resided at Beaver Hall, near Southgate, London. His son Henry Schneider, industrialist and politician, was born there in 1817 to him and his second wife, Elizabeth Moul.

== John Schneider & Co. ==
The firm of John Schneider & Co. imported goods from the Russian Empire, and Schneider was a furrier. He was also involved with the scandal over Mexican debt.

== Death ==
Schneider died at Brighton in 1851, at age 83. His will is held by the British National Archives.
