= Wolstenholme baronets =

Baronetcy in the Baronetage of England

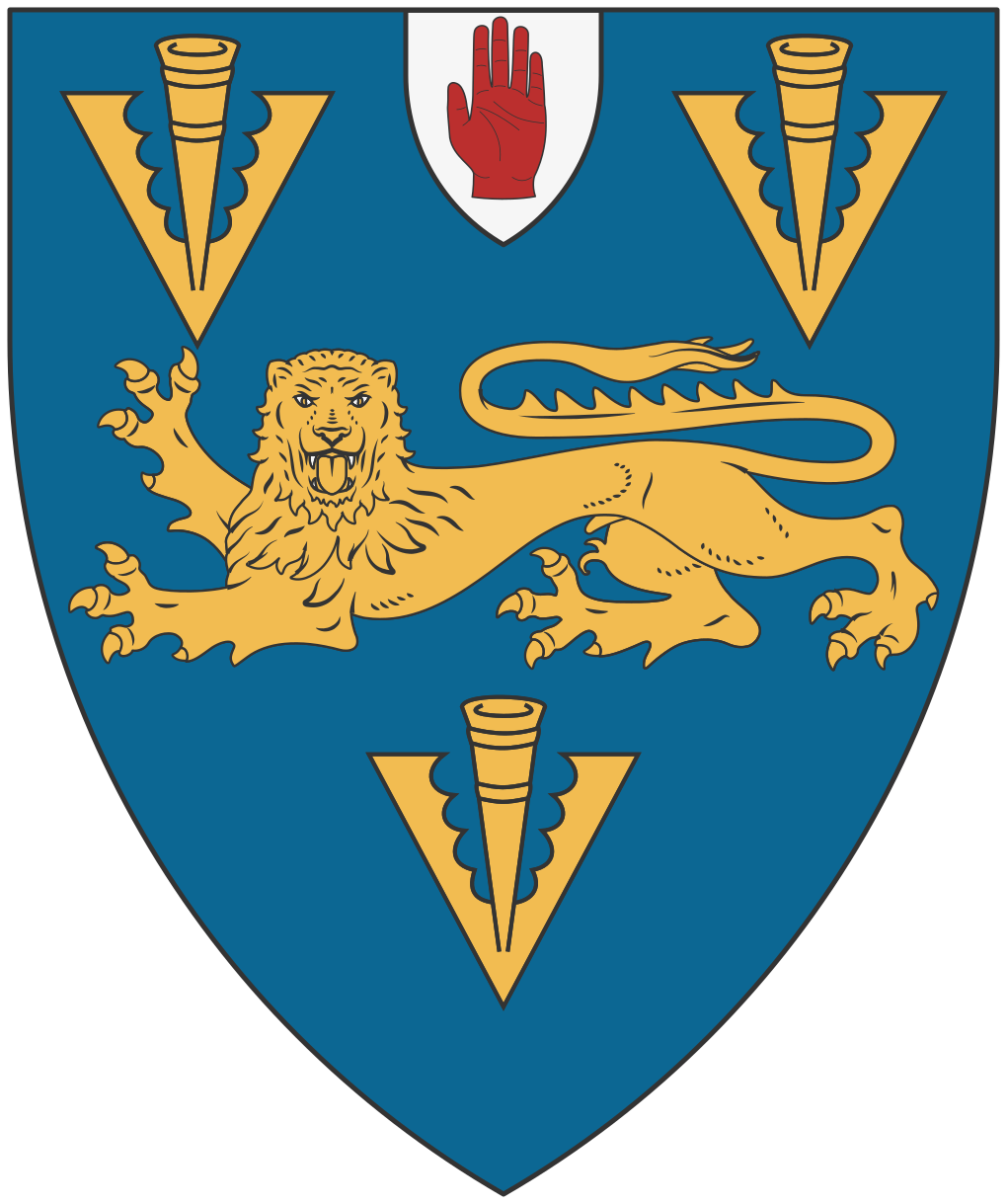
Arms of Wolstenholme of London

The Wolstenholme Baronetcy, of London, was a title in the Baronetage of England. It was created on 10 January 1665 for John Wolstenholme, who had previously represented West Looe, Newport and Queenborough in Parliament. He had been heavily fined by the Parliamentarians for supporting the Royal cause during the Civil War. The third Baronet sat as Member of Parliament for Middlesex. The title became extinct on the death of the seventh Baronet in 1762.

== Wolstenholme baronets, of London (1665) ==
- Sir John Wolstenholme, 1st Baronet (c. 1596–1670)
  - John Wolstenholme
- Sir Thomas Wolstenholme, 2nd Baronet (c. 1622–1691)
- Sir John Wolstenholme, 3rd Baronet (1649–1709)
- Sir Nicholas Wolstenholme, 4th Baronet (1676–1717)
- Sir William Wolstenholme, 5th Baronet (1689–1724)
- Sir Thomas Wolstenholme, 6th Baronet (c. 1660–1738)
- Sir Francis Wolstenholme, 7th Baronet (died 1762)
