= Beaver Hall =

Coordinates: 51.6231°N 0.1324°W

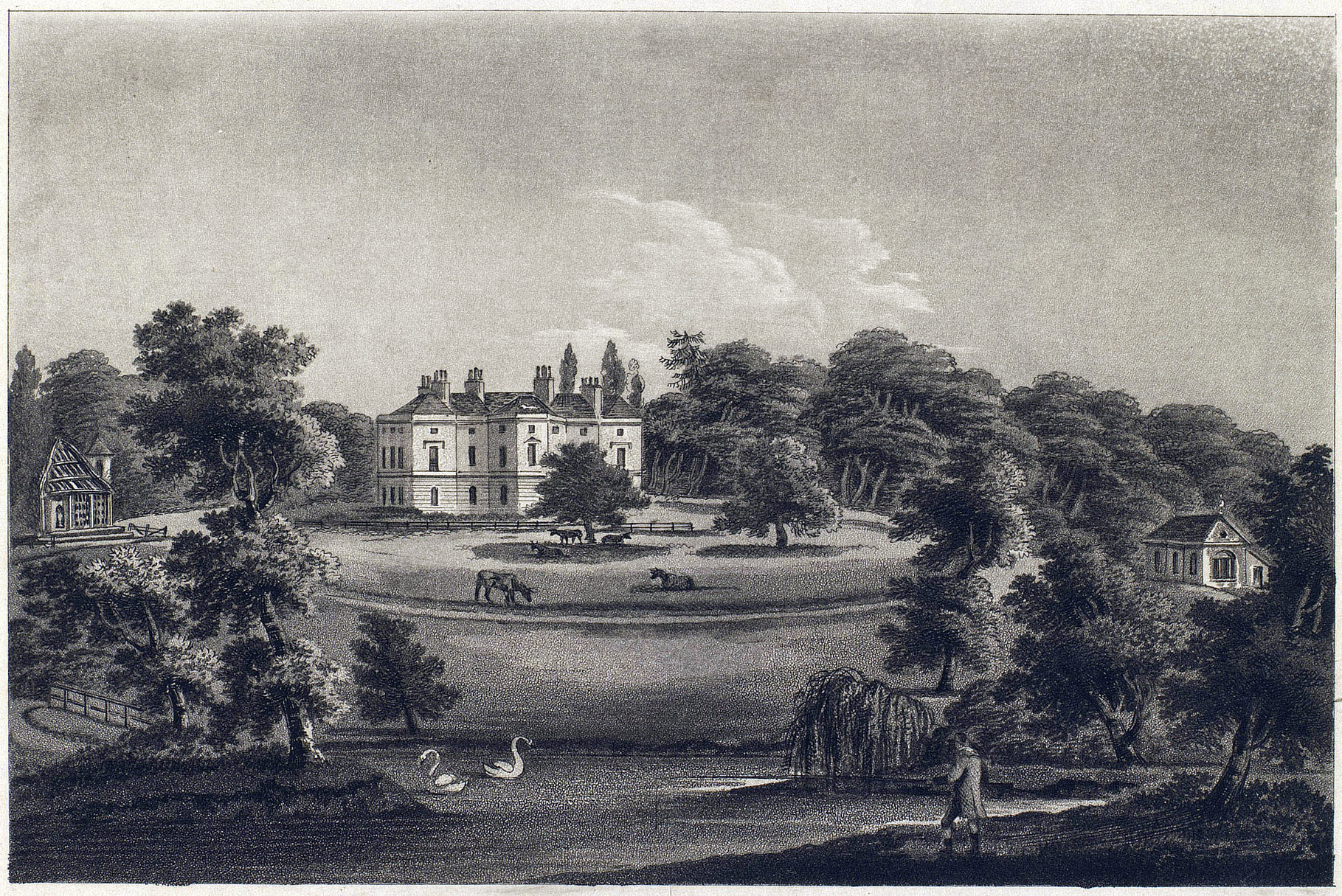
Beaver Hall The Seat of John Locke Esq. Southgate Middlesex. John Hassell, London, 1804.

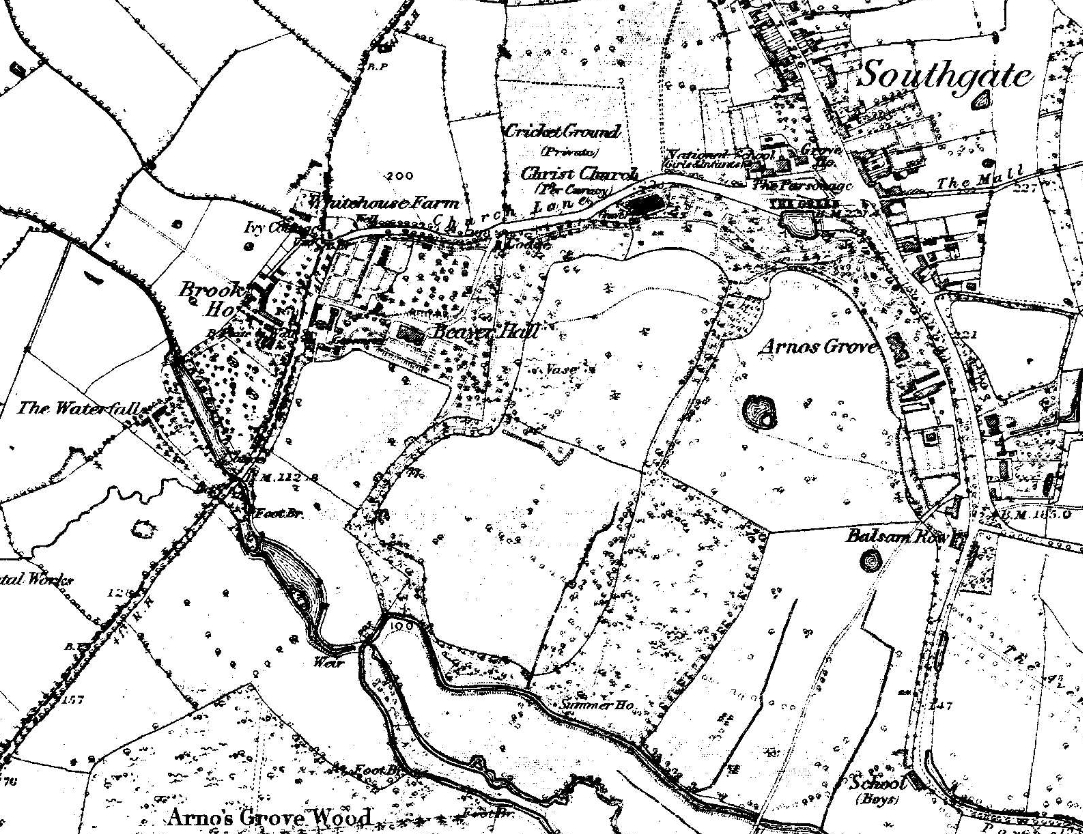
Beaver Hall (centre) and Arnos Grove on a mid 19th-century Ordnance Survey map

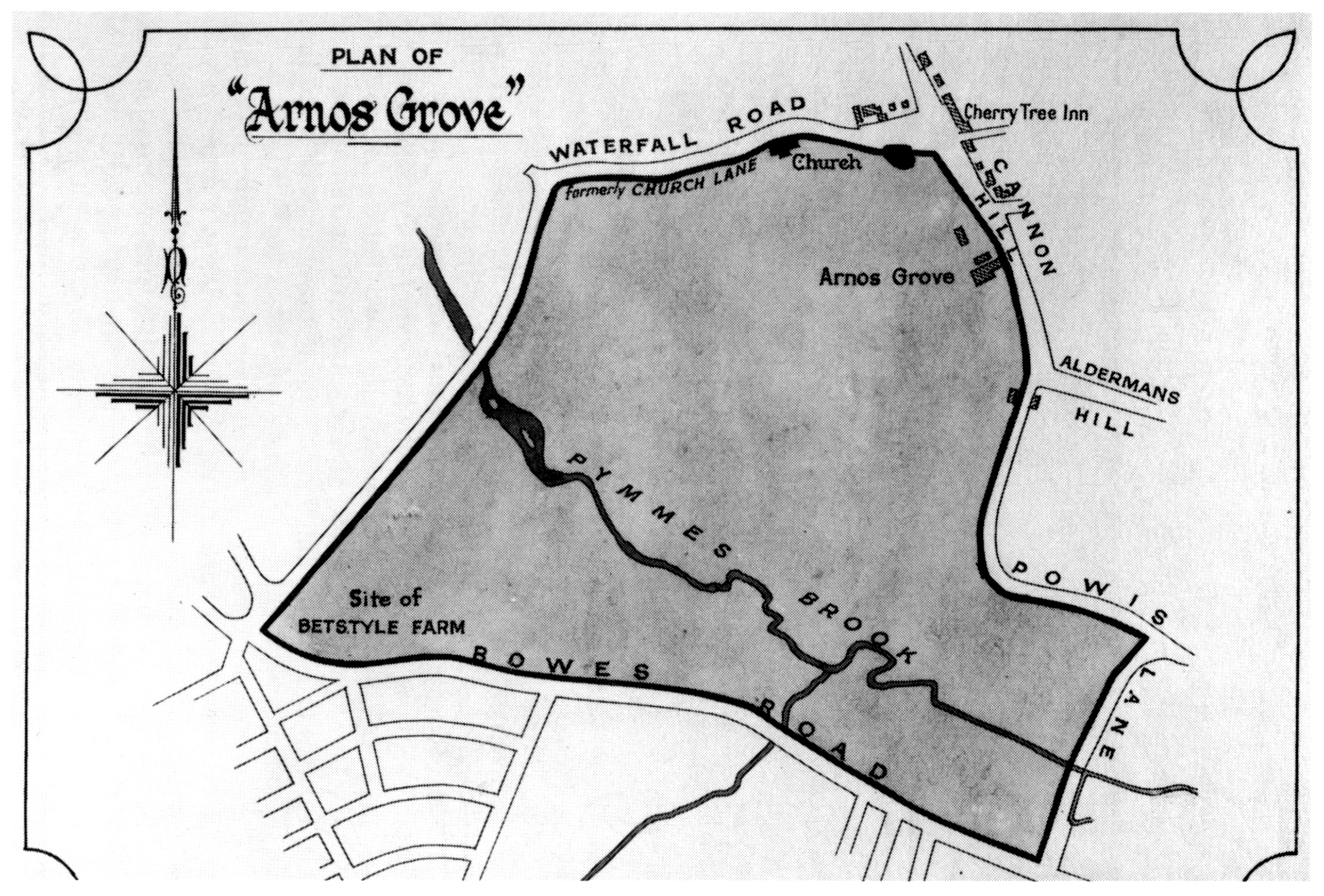
Plan of Arnos Grove from 1918 sale particulars incorporating the former Beaver Hall and Minchington Hall estates

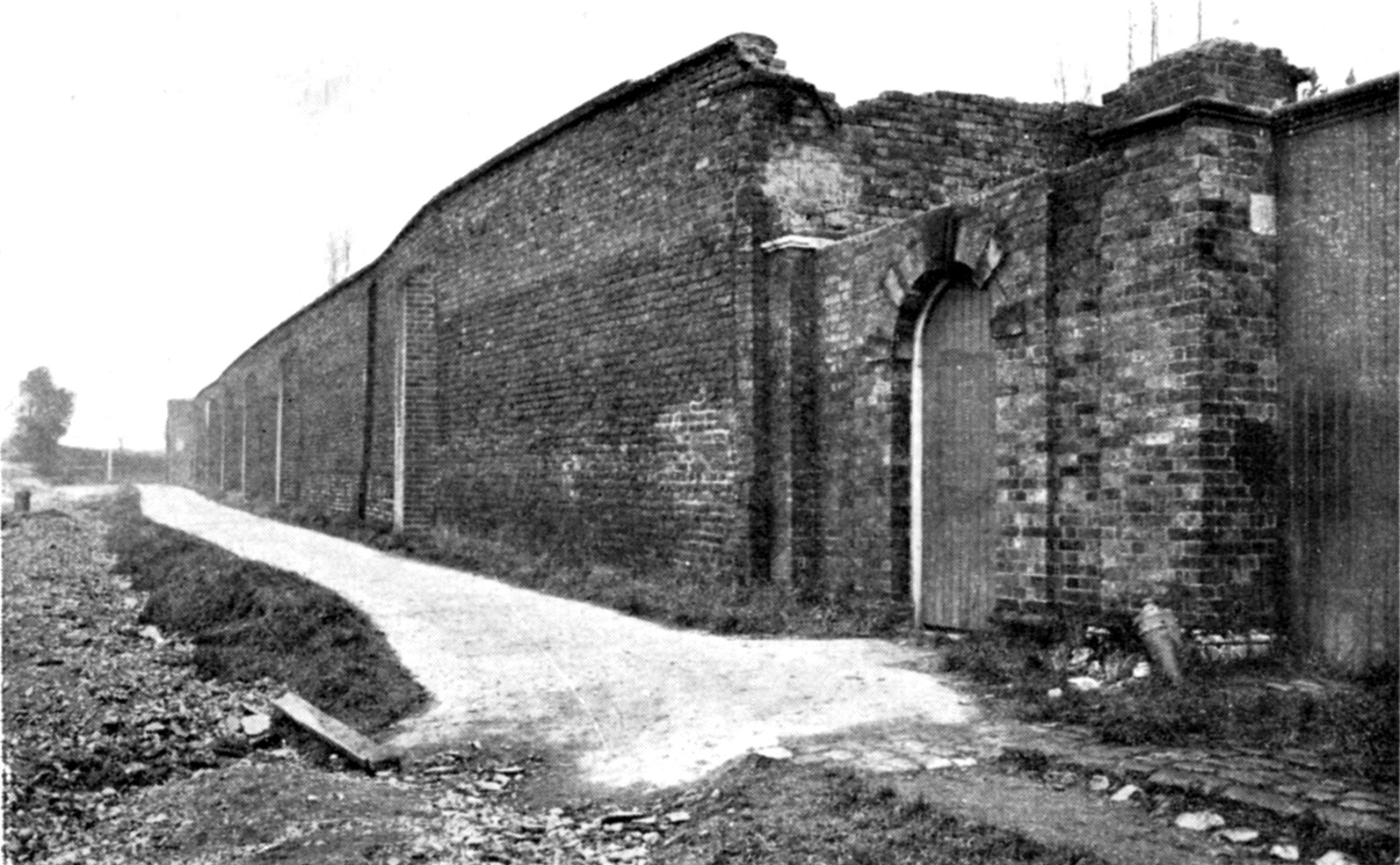
Remains of Beaver Hall stables, Waterfall Road. They were demolished in 1924.

Beaver Hall was a country house in Middlesex, England. It was set in grounds of around 40 acres (16 ha) that stood to the east and south of the current Waterfall Road, then known as Waterfall Lane and Church Hill, near the old centre of Southgate. The grounds stretched as far south as the Pymmes Brook where Arnos Park was later built. Beaver Hall was acquired by John Walker of the Taylor-Walker brewing family in 1870. The house was demolished in 1871 and the grounds merged into the adjacent Arnos Grove estate.

== The house ==
According to Nikolaus Pevsner's The Buildings of England, the house was built in the 1760s, possibly to a design by the architect Sir Robert Taylor who also worked on Arnos Grove house. It stood near the corner of the modern Waterfall Road and Chandos Avenue.

It was drawn and engraved by John Hassell in 1804 at which time it was the home of the merchant and shipowner John Locke. Subsequently, it was the home of the Schneider family, who moved to England from Switzerland in the eighteenth century. Henry Schneider, industrialist and politician, was born there in 1817 to the merchant John Henry Powell Schneider (c. 1768 – 1861) and his second wife, Elizabeth Moule.

The house was occupied by the railway contractor Joseph Thornton (1804–1889) and his family from at least 1858. The 1861 census shows him there with his wife Amelia and six children (one visiting with her husband), a governess, lady's maid, nurse, cook, butler, footman, and four other maids.

== Demolition ==
The house and its grounds were acquired by John Walker of the Taylor-Walker brewing family in 1870. The house was demolished in May 1871 and the grounds merged into the adjacent Arnos Grove estate as part of what Alan Dumayne called a "private green belt" policy of the Walkers of acquiring neighbouring estates and demolishing the house in order to prevent local development. The Walkers had done the same with the adjacent Minchington Hall in the 1850s.

The stone from the house and many of the fittings were used in the construction of Stone Hall in Church Hill, Winchmore Hill, in 1872.
