= Sherborne Mercury =

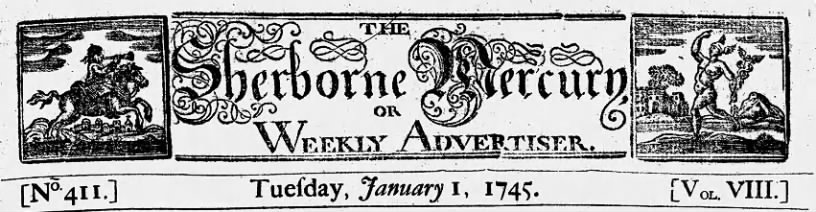
Masthead of the 1 January 1745 edition of the Sherborne Mercury

The Sherborne Mercury is a defunct regional newspaper, published in Sherborne, Dorset, United Kingdom. It began publication in 1737, predating the national Times by nearly a half century, and, after merging with the Western Flying Post in 1749, was published as late as 1867, when it further merged into the Western Gazette.

== History ==
The Sherborne Mercury was first issued in February 1737, (Note: The initial publication of the Sherborne Mercury was in February 173 6/7, which fell between New Year's Day (January 1) and the start of the British civil year (March 25)—see discussion at Old Style and New Style dates#Start of year adjustment. The Western Gazette began noting the founding year of the Sherborne Mercury as 1737 rather than 1736 at some point during 1986–1987.) published by Henry Bettinson in Sherborne, a town in Dorset. Another newspaper, the Western Flying Post, was first issued issue in 1743, founded by Robert Goadby in Yeovil, a town in Somerset. In 1749, the publications merged, with the resulting newspaper printed in Sherborne—the first combined issue was dated January 30. Subsequently, it was published under a series of names, as outlined in a below section.

In 1867, the newspaper (then operating under Western Flying Post naming) merged with the Western Gazette, which had been founded in 1863 in Yeovil. The merged result was initially known as The Western Gazette and Flying Post, but eventually came to be known simply as the Western Gazette again.

The Sherborne Mercury’s news coverage and distribution went beyond the boundaries of Dorset. Before any newspaper was published in Cornwall, the Sherborne Mercury had subscribers and distribution throughout Cornwall, as far west as Penzance. It covered Cornish news items, and was read by businessmen and members of the professional class in the county.

The hawkers, news boys and news carriers were known as Sherbornes. This name was also applied to hawkers and carriers of other regional and local newspapers in the West Country.

Archive copies of this local paper can be found in the County Archives offices of the aforementioned Dorset and Cornwall, along with Wiltshire and Devon, testament to its historical importance as a newspaper of record in the West Country. It remains a popular source for genealogists and local historians. The Newspapers.com archive site also includes many editions of the paper.

== Naming ==
Names of the newspaper, starting in 1749 when the Sherborne Mercury and Western Flying Post merged, included the following (bold text indicates prominent wording of the masthead):

- The **Western Flying-Post**; or, Sherborne and Yeovil Mercury (1749, Mondays)
- The Western Flying-Post; or, Sherborne and Yeovil Mercury: and General Advertiser (1765, Mondays)
- **The Sherborne Journal** (1774, Thursdays)
- **The Sherborne Journal**, and **Western Advertiser** (1780, Thursdays)
- **The Dorchester and Sherborne Journal**, and Western Advertiser (1791, Fridays)
- The Western Flying Post, **Sherborne and Yeovil Mercury**, and General Advertiser for Dorset, Somerset, Devon, and Cornwall (1827, Saturdays)
- The Western Flying Post, **Sherborne Mercury and Yeovil Times**. General Advertiser for Somerset, Dorset, Wilts, Devon, and Cornwall (1851, Tuesdays)
- The Western Flying Post, **Yeovil Times and Sherborne Mercury**. General Advertiser for Somerset, Dorset, Wilts, Devon, and Cornwall (1856, Tuesdays)
- The **Western Flying Post**, Yeovil. — flanked by Yeovil and Somerset Times. and Sherborne and Dorset Mercury. (1857, Tuesdays)
- **Western Flying Post**, Yeovil. — flanked by Yeovil and Somerset Times. and Sherborne and Dorset Mercury. (1859, Tuesdays)
- **The Western Flying Post**, Yeovil and Somerset Times, Sherborne and Dorset Mercury, Yeovil (1860, Tuesdays)
