= Joseph Thornton (contractor) =

English railway contractor (1804–1889)

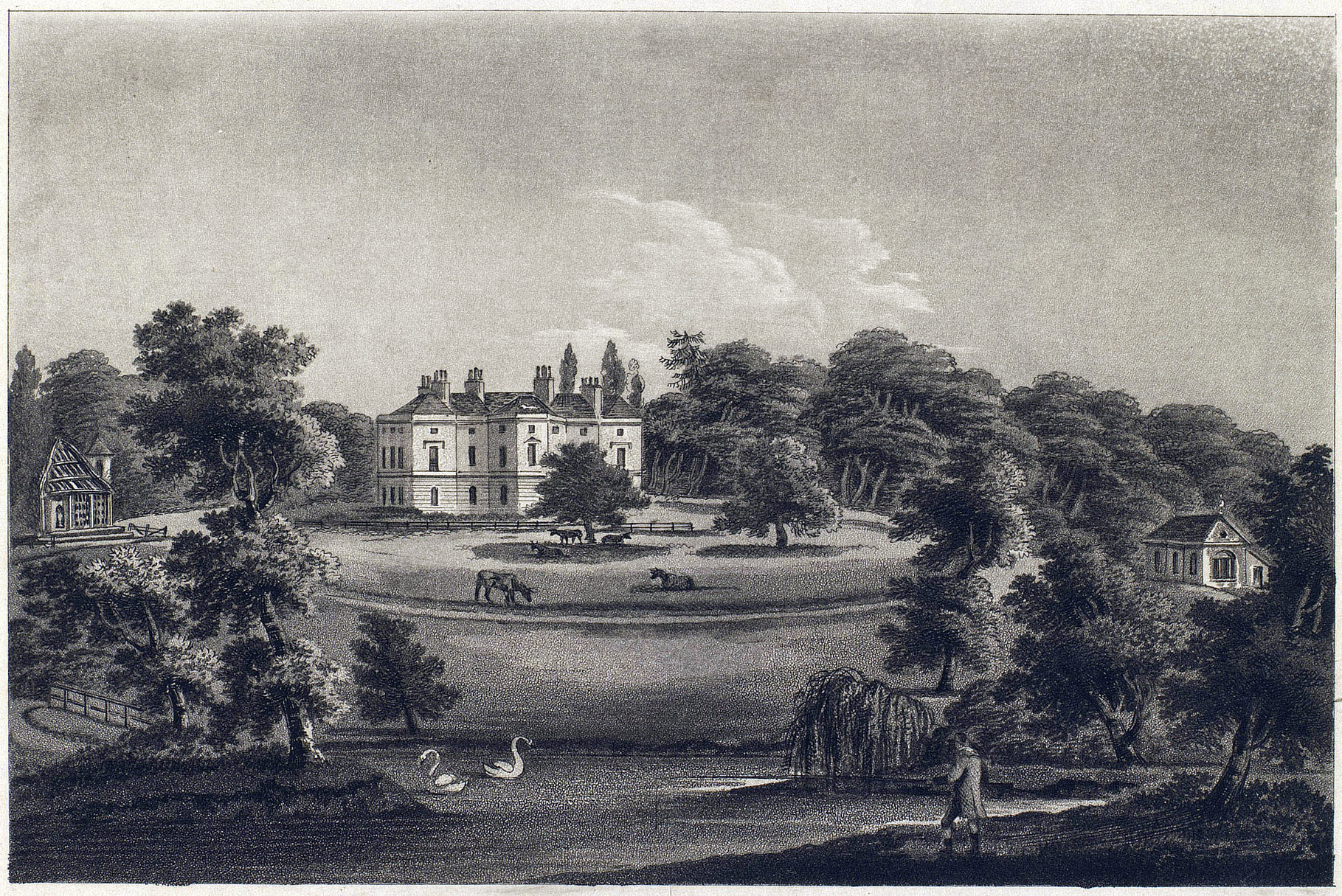
Beaver Hall The Seat of John Locke Esq. Southgate Middlesex. John Hassell, London, 1804.

Joseph Thornton (1804 – 9 May 1889) was a railway contractor in England in the mid-nineteenth century. He was in business building railway lines for the many railway companies in Victorian Britain and was a director of a number of companies connected to his profession. He lived at Beaver Hall in Southgate near London with his large family and servants but left an estate of only £545.

== Early life and family ==
Joseph Thornton was born in 1804 in Snaith, in the West Riding of Yorkshire. He married Amelia with whom he had at least six children.

== Career ==
Thornton was in business building railway lines for the many railway companies in Victorian Britain. He was also a director of companies such as the Water-Works Company for Madrid (1852), the Ambergate, Nottingham, Boston and Eastern Junction Railway (1856) and the Mercantile Credit Association (Limited) (1864).

He and his family lived at Beaver Hall, Southgate, from at least 1858. The 1861 census shows him there with his wife Amelia and six children (one visiting with her husband), a governess, lady's maid, nurse, cook, butler, footman, and four other maids. In 1871, he was shown as widowed and living in Kensington but the family still had four servants.

== Later life ==
By 1881, Thornton was retired and lodging with the Newman family at Kensington Park Road, London. He died there, at number 98, on 9 May 1889. Probate was granted to his son, Frederic William Thornton, a mechanical engineer of 100 Palace Chambers, Bridge Street, in the City of Westminster. He left an estate of £545.
