= Minchington Hall =

Country house and estate in London

Coordinates: 51°37′28″N 0°07′33″W

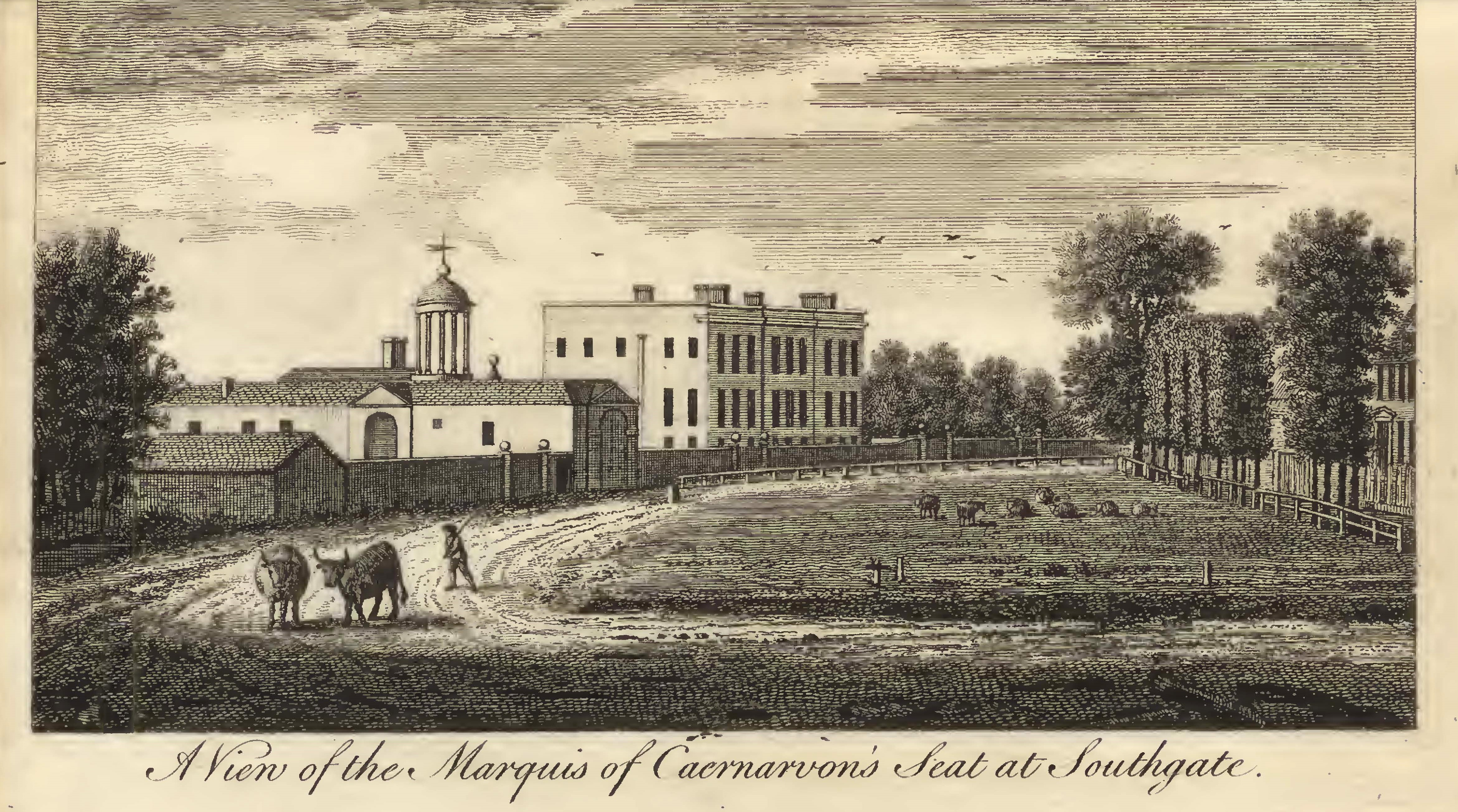
A View of the Marquis of Caernarvon's Seat at Southgate from Robert Goadby's A New Display of the Beauties of England (1776)

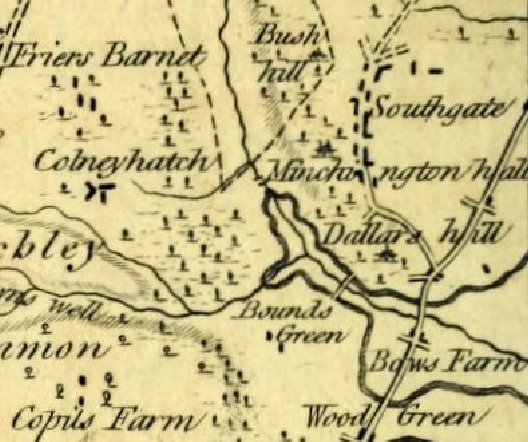
Minchington Hall within Middlesex, 1783

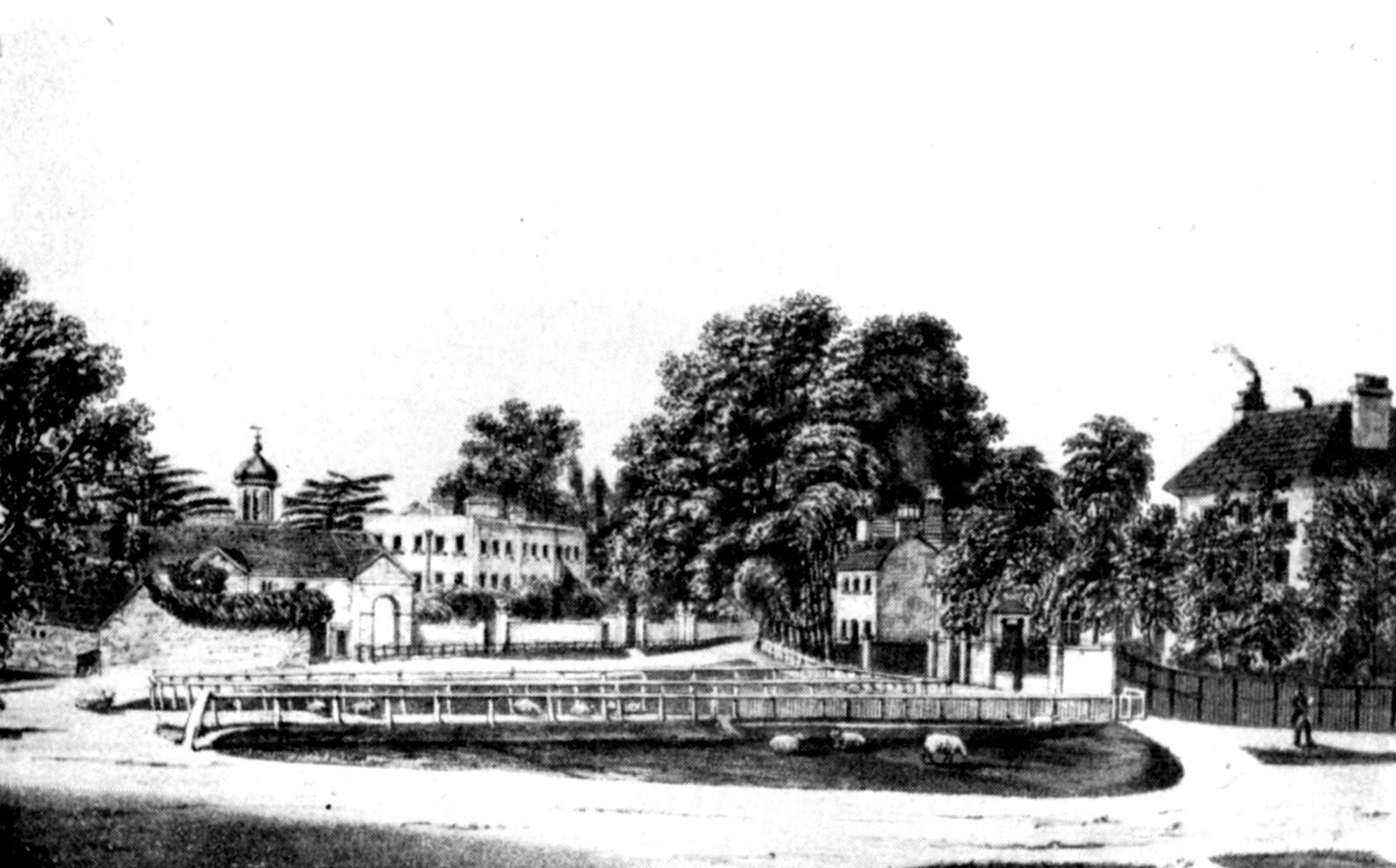
Minchington Hall and Southgate Green in the 19th century

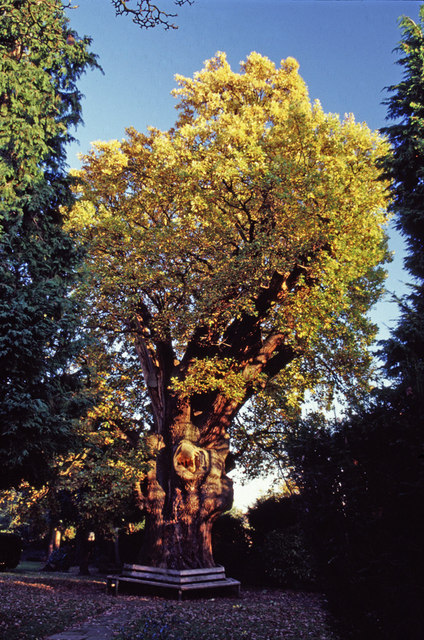
The Minchenden Oak

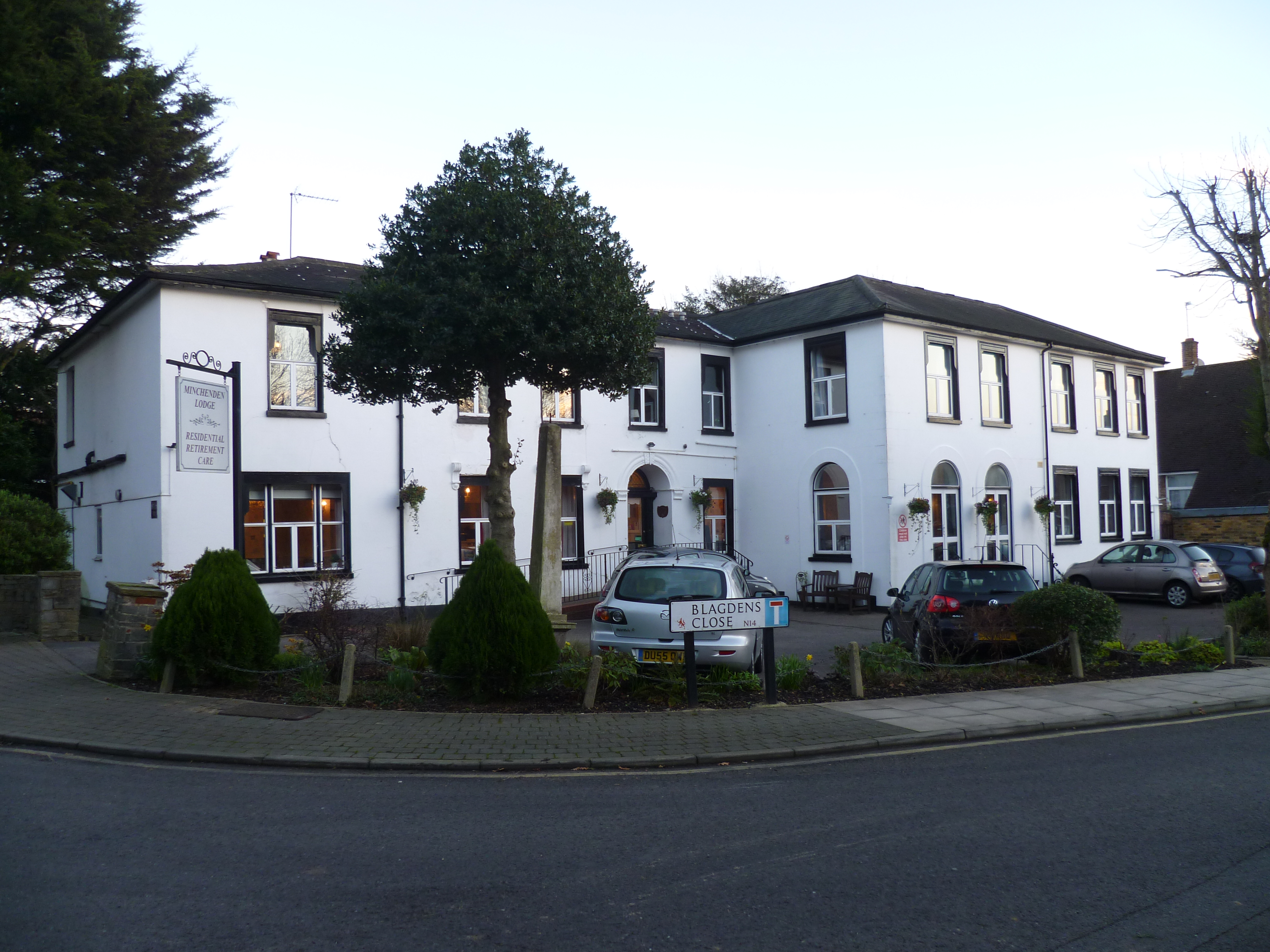
Minchenden Lodge, Blagdens Close, partly built with materials from the demolished Minchington Hall

Minchington Hall, Mincington Hall, or Minchenden House was a country house and estate in Southgate, then in the county of Middlesex in England, and now in Greater London. It was on Southgate Green and the south side of Waterfall Road, and adjoined Arnolds (Arnos Grove) slightly further east, which was originally less significant than Minchington. The estate was merged into Arnos Grove in 1853 and the house demolished.

== History ==
The estate is believed to have acquired its name from the nuns (Old English: myncen) who occupied a nunnery where Broomfield House is now. Before the Dissolution, the Augustinian priory of Clerkenwell owned land in the area.

The estate was part of the Cecil lands and in 1614 it was sold by the Earl of Salisbury to John Weld of Arnolds when it was described as a wood of 50 acres (20 ha). It was later owned by Sir Thomas Stringer who sold it to Sir Thomas Wolstenholme before 1672. In 1716, Sir David Hechstetter, Hamburg merchant and justice of the peace, purchased the land.

Minchington Hall was built on the south side of Waterfall Road after 1664 by Sir Thomas Wolstenholme. From 1714 until his death in 1721, it was leased to Sir David Hechstetter. The building was altered in 1738 or 1747 by the merchant John Nicholl but he died not long after. It was said by local people that the house had one window for every week of the year.

It was mentioned in England's Gazetteer (1751), Mostyn Armstrong's An Actual Survey of the Great Post-roads between London and Edinburgh (1783) and The Universal Gazetteer (1798), although none of those sources mention Arnolds.

In 1753 the estate became part of the Brydges estate in Middlesex when Margaret Nicholl, daughter of John Nicholl, married James Brydges, Marquess of Carnarvon and later Duke of Chandos. He had been appointed Ranger of Enfield Chase. After his death in 1789, his widow Anne Eliza, Dowager Duchess of Chandos (died 1813), received Minchington Hall and 105 acres (42 ha) of the estate for life. The remainder of the estate went to the duke's daughter and heir, Anne Elizabeth Brydges and, through her marriage, to the Marquis of Buckingham.

The estate was sold to Isaac Walker in 1853. He merged it into Arnos Grove and demolished the house, in line with what Alan Dumayne calls a "private green belt" policy of acquiring neighbouring estates and demolishing the house in order to expand Arnos Grove and prevent local development. John Walker did the same in 1870 with the Beaver Hall estate.

== Legacy ==
Materials from the demolished Minchington Hall were used when Henry Eaton, landlord of The Cherry Tree extended the nearby Albert Cottage, which he renamed Minchenden Lodge. It became a care home.

The estate is also remembered in the Minchenden Oak Garden, opened 1934, in Waterfall Road which contains the Minchenden Oak, also known as the Chandos Oak, which is said to have once had the largest canopy spread of any tree in England. It featured in Jacob Strutt's Sylva Britannica (1821) and was originally part of the Minchington estate.

Minchenden Grammar School was established in 1919 and was later merged into Arnos School, which became Broomfield School. It was named after the Minchenden Oak which featured in the school's badge.

A plaque at 18 The Green, Southgate Green, marks the former location of the house. Minchenden Crescent runs between Chandos Avenue in the west and Forestdale in the east over ground that was once part of Minchington estate.

== See also ==
- Cullands Grove
- Grace baronets
