= Green Dragon, Dancers Hill =

Pub in Hertfordshire, England

Coordinates: 51°40′29″N 0°12′59″W

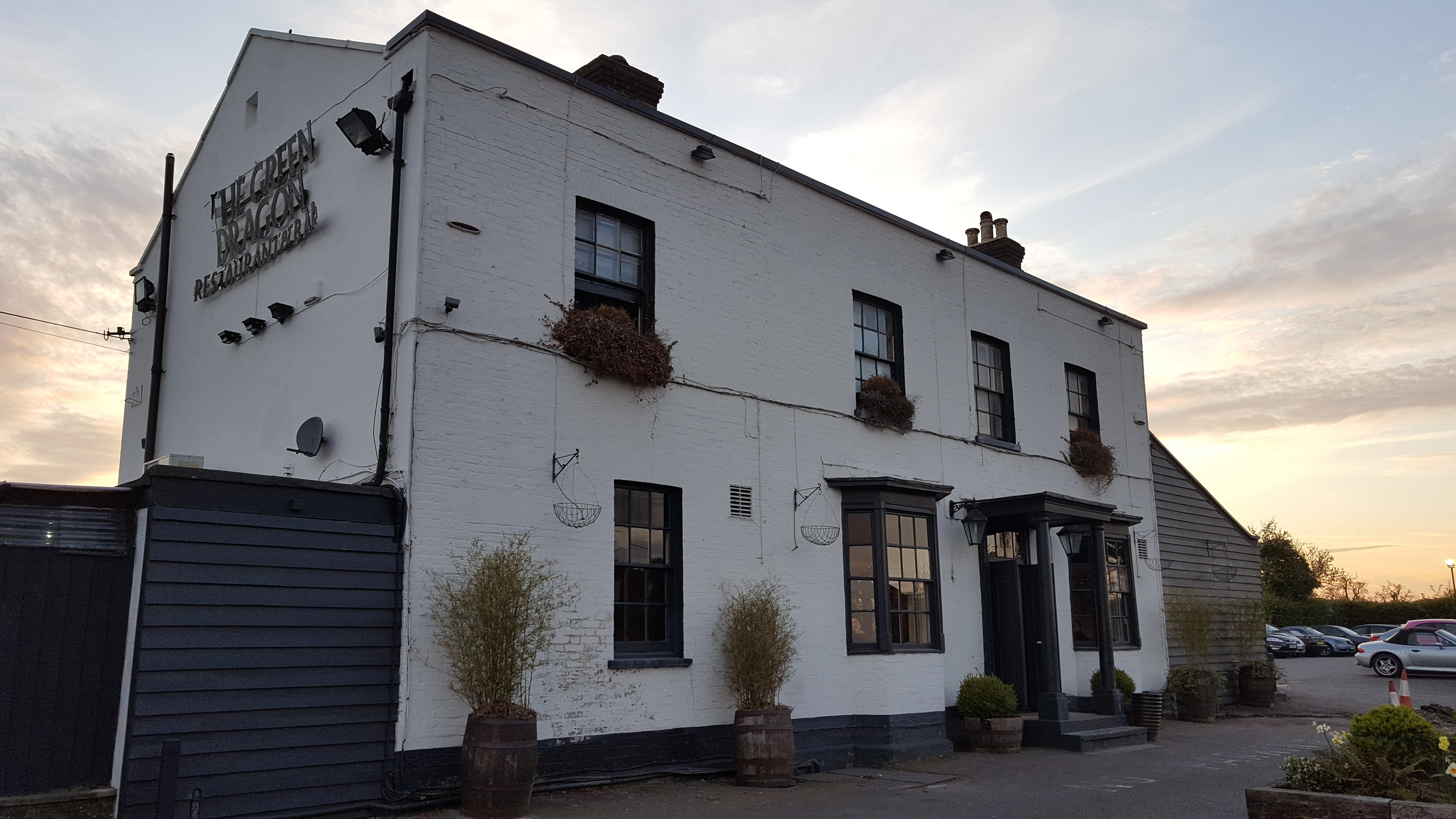
The Green Dragon

The Green Dragon is a Grade II listed public house in St Albans Road, Dancers Hill, Hertfordshire, England, on the road north from Chipping Barnet. It dates from around 1830 and is built of brick with a slate roof.
