= Dancers Hill =

Hill in Hertfordshire, England

Coordinates: 51°40′46″N 0°12′57″W

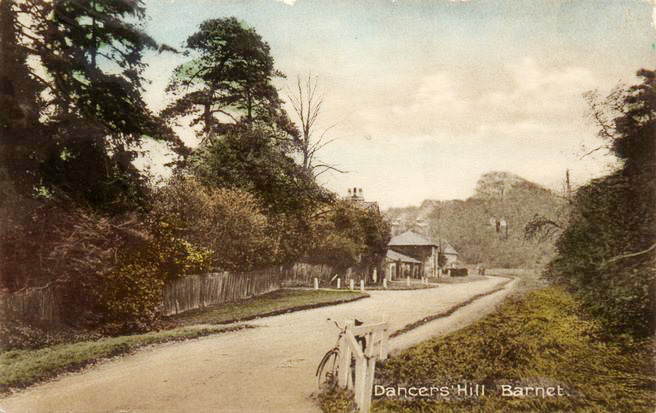
Dancers Hill in an old postcard

Dancers Hill is a hamlet in Hertfordshire, England, immediately south of the route of the M25 motorway. It was formerly in the historic county of Middlesex.

The disputed manor of Mandeville was said to lie on the hill and to be part of the manor of South Mimms.

It is now best known for the Grade II listed Dancers Hill House (c. 1750–1760) and for Dancers Hill Road, which runs between St Albans Road in the west and Ganwick Corner in the west via Bentley Heath. The road is joined by Baker Street on its north side and Kitts End Road on its south side. Dancers Lane runs north from Dancers Hill Road past Dancers Hill House before joining Wash Lane.

Dancers Hill Farmhouse, in Dancers Lane, is also Grade II listed, as are the Green Dragon public house (c. 1830) in St Albans Road and the nearby bridge over the Mimmshall Brook.

Just to the southwest of Dancers Hill is Dyrham Park, with its Grade II listed mansion.
