= John Wolstenholme (merchant) =

English financier and merchant

Sir John Wolstenholme
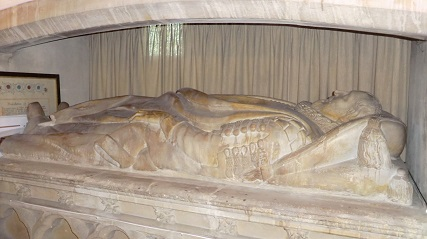
- Funeral effigy carved by Nicholas Stone
- Born: 1562
- Died: 25 November 1639 (aged 76–77)
- Buried: Great Stanmore church
- Spouse: Catherine Fanshawe (m.)
- Issue: Sir John Wolstenholme, 1st Baronet

Sir John Wolstenholme (1562 – 25 November 1639) was an English financier and merchant-adventurer.

== Life ==
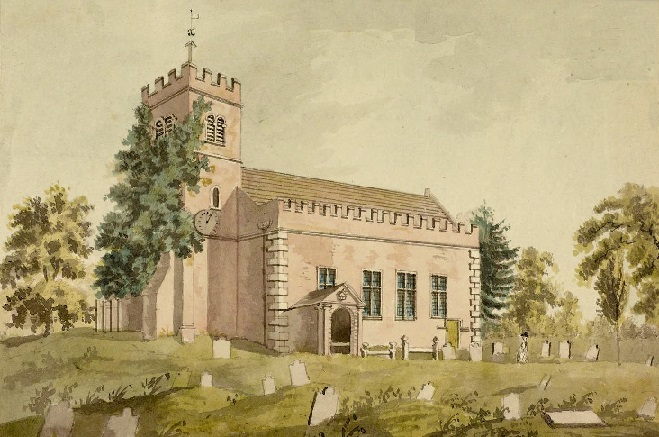
Old St. John the Evangelist, Great Stanmore (c. 1800)

John Wolstenholme, of an old Derbyshire family, was the second son of John Wolstenholme, who came to London in the reign of Edward VI and obtained a post in the customs. The son at an early age became one of the richest merchants in London, and during the last half of his life took a prominent part in the extension of English commerce, in colonisation, and in maritime discovery. In December 1600, he was one of the incorporators of the East India Company; in 1609 he was a member of council for the Virginia Company; he took a lively interest in the attempts to discover a Northwest Passage; was one of those who fitted out the expeditions of Henry Hudson (died 1611) (who named Cape Wolstenholme after him) in 1610; of (Sir) Thomas Button in 1612, of Robert Bylot and William Baffin in 1615 (when his name was given to Wolstenholme Island and Wolstenholme Sound), and of Luke Fox in 1631. Together with Sir Thomas Smith (Smythe) (c. 1558–1625) he engaged Edward Wright (c. 1558–1615) to give lectures on navigation. On 12 March 1617 he was knighted. Wolstenholme bought the manor of Clayhall around this time.

In February 1619 he was a Commissioner of the Navy, but in December 1619 he was confined to his house by the King's command "for muttering against a patent and newly erected office in the customs house". As he was one of the Farmers of the Customs, the innovation presumably threatened to affect his interests. On 15 July 1624, he was appointed a commissioner for winding up the affairs of the Virginia Company; for several years afterwards he was a member of the King's Council for Virginia; in 1631 he was a Commissioner for the Plantation of Virginia. In 1635–1637, he was on a commission to inquire into the administration of the Chest at Chatham.

Wolstenholme died on 25 November 1639, and was buried in Great Stanmore church, where there is a handsome monument to his memory by Nicholas Stone. He married Catherine Fanshawe, and had issue two sons and two daughters. Of the daughters, the elder, Joan, married Sir Robert Knollys; the other, Catherine, married William Fanshawe, a nephew of Sir Thomas Smythe, and half-brother of Sir Henry Fanshawe; see also Thomas Fanshawe.

== Bibliography ==
- Laughton, J. K.; Bowen, H. V. (2004). "Wolstenholme, Sir John". In Oxford Dictionary of National Biography. Oxford: Oxford University Press. n.p.
- Laughton, John Knox (1900). "Wolstenholme, John" . In Lee, Sidney (ed.). Dictionary of National Biography. Vol. 62. London: Smith, Elder & Co. p. 344.
- Thrush, Andrew; Ferris, John P., eds. (2010). "Wolstenholme (Worsnam), Sir John". In The History of Parliament: the House of Commons 1604-1629. Cambridge: Cambridge University Press. n.p.
