= Dancers Hill House =

Listed house in Hertfordshire, England

Coordinates: 51°40′47″N 0°12′54″W

Dancers Hill House is a Grade II listed house in Dancers Hill, Hertfordshire, England. The current house dates from c. 1750–1760, with later additions, and was probably built for Charles Ross, a Westminster builder, who leased 10 acres from David Hechstetter Jr. for 80 years in 1750. The grotto north-east of the house is also Grade II listed.

The house has been used as a school, and during the Second World War it was part of Camp 33, which housed Italian prisoners of war.

The house was used as a filming location for a number of episodes of the children's comedy series Chucklevision.

In 2018, the owners, Nigel and Melanie Walsh, who bought the house in 1992, offered it for sale by raffle, with a winner being drawn in January 2020.
