= Mostyn Armstrong =

English publisher (died 1791)

Mostyn John Armstrong
- Died: 11 December 1791
- Occupations: Map publisher, surveyor
- Known for: Publishing maps and county surveys in Britain
- Notable work: An actual survey of the great post-roads between London and Edinburgh; The History and Antiquities of the County of Norfolk; A Scotch atlas; or, Description of the Kingdom of Scotland

Mostyn John Armstrong (died 11 December 1791) was an English publisher of maps who worked at first with his father Andrew Armstrong and later on his own.

== Selected publications ==
- An actual survey of the great post-roads between London and Edinburgh: with the country three miles, on each side, drawn on a scale of half an inch to a mile
- An essay on the contour of the coast of Norfolk: but more particularly as it relates to the marum-banks & sea-breaches, so loudly and so justly complained of!
- The History and antiquities of the county of Norfolk
- A Scotch atlas; or, Description of the Kingdom of Scotland: divided into counties
- Thirty-miles round Boston
- A map of the county of Northumberland with that part of the county of Durham that is north of the River Tyne also the town of Berwick and its bounds. Taken from an actual survey and laid down from a scale of an inch to a mile.
