= Sir John Wolstenholme, 1st Baronet =

Sir John Wolstenholme, 1st Baronet (died 1670) was an English politician who sat in the House of Commons in 1640. He supported the Royalist side in the English Civil War.

== Biography ==
Wolstenholme was the son of Sir John Wolstenholme (died 1639) and his wife Catherine Fanshaw, daughter of John Fanshawe of Fanshawe Gate Hall. He became a customs farmer with his father and was knighted by King Charles I. In 1620, Wolstenholme bought a house called Clay Hall from Christopher Hatton's widow, Alice Fanshawe.

He was a Virginia commissioner before the government and lobbied for a return to the original charter.

In April 1640, he was elected Member of Parliament for Queenborough in the Short Parliament. He supported the king in the Civil War, selling property and incurring debts to provide finance for the Royalist cause. As a result, he was then fined by Parliament. He and his father's partners in the customs farming business were required to pay £150,000 which led to the sale of his estates. His son Henry and brother-in-law Sir Thomas Dallison were both killed in the Civil War. After the Restoration, he became a farmer of customs again and was given a patent for collecting taxes on outbound goods in the Port of London. He was created a baronet, of London, by King Charles II in 1664.

== Death ==
Wolstenholme died in 1670 and was buried on 15 July at Stanmore in St John's Church, which had been built by his father.

Wolstenholme married Ann Dallison of Laughton, Lincolnshire. His son, Thomas, succeeded to the baronetcy.

Parliament of England
Vacant Parliament suspended since 1629	Member of Parliament for Queenborough; 1640; With: Sir Edward Hales, Bt	Succeeded by Sir Edward Hales, Bt; William Harrison
Baronetage of England
New creation	Baronet (of London); 1665–1670	Succeeded by Thomas Wolstenholme
