= John Hassell =

British artist

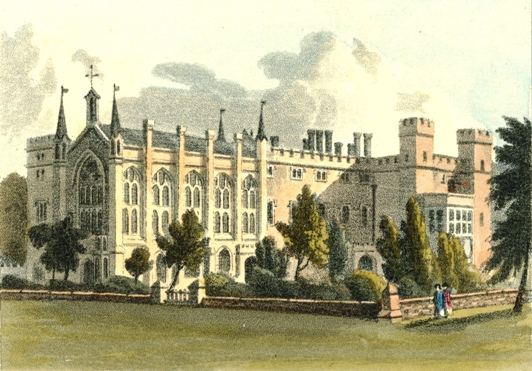
Cassiobury House (from "Picturesque rides and walks", 1818)

John Hassell (c. 1767 – 1825) was an English watercolour landscape painter, engraver, illustrator, writer, publisher and drawing-master. He wrote a biography of fellow artist George Morland.

Hassell first appeared as an exhibitor at the Royal Academy, in London, in 1789 with a 'View of Stonehenge on Salisbury Plain.' He drew many views of local scenery, which he engraved himself in aquatint, most of them coloured. They were published in various topographical works. He had a large practice as a drawing-master and published some books on water-colour painting and drawing. Hassell was a friend of George Morland and wrote his biography (published in 1800); he also engraved Morland's drawing of 'Conway Castle' in aquatint.

His son Edward Hassell (d. 1852) was also a watercolourist, and exhibited for a number of years at the Society of British Artists, of which he became a member in 1841, and was also secretary. He occasionally exhibited at the Royal Academy and British Institution.

== Published works ==
Hassell published the following works, all illustrated with engravings in aquatint by the artist himself:

- A Tour of the Isle of Wight (1790 - 2 vols).
- A Picturesque Guide to Bath, Bristol Hot-Wells, the River Avon and the Adjacent Country (1793). Co-authored with J C Ibbetson & John Laporte (1761–1839).
- Views of Noblemen's and Gentlemen's Seats [...] in the Counties Adjoining London (1804).
- Beauties of Antiquity (1806).
- Memoirs of the life of the late George Morland (London: J. Cunee, 1806).
- The Speculum or Art of Drawing in Water-colours (1809).
- Calcographia, or the Art of Multiplying Drawings (1811)
- Aqua Pictura; Illustrated by a Series of Original Specimens from the Works of Messrs. Payne, Munn, Francis, and Others (1813).
- Picturesque Rides and Walks, with Excursions by Water, Thirty Miles Round the British Metropolis (1818; 2 vols.).
- Tour of the Grand Junction Canal (1819)
- Rides and Walks Round London (1820; 2 vols)
- The Camera; or Art of Drawing in Water-colours (1823).
- Excursions of Pleasure and Sports on the Thames (1823)
- Graphic Delineation: a Practical Treatise on the Art of Etching (1830).
