= Robert Goadby =

English printer and publisher

Robert Goadby (1721–1778) was an English printer and publisher in Sherborne, Dorset. He was a Whig supporter, and influential through his newspaper, the Sherborne Mercury. He also made available the standard version of the supposed autobiography of the rogue Bampfylde Moore Carew. Goadby, his wife and others have been given credit for this popular work that gave Carew the status of folk hero.

== Life ==
Goadby was the son of Samuel Goadby of the Founders' Company in London. In 1740, he set up a bookseller's business in Bath, Somerset, in Wade's Passage, a central location in an alley recently constructed by George Wade. In 1744, he was in Yeovil, and published there the Western Flying Post, or, Yeovil Mercury.

In 1749, Goadby merged his Yeovil title with the existing Sherborne Mercury, or, Weekly Advertiser, and the resulting Western Flying Post, or, Sherborne and Yeovil Mercury was generally known as the Sherborne Mercury. Sherborne was well placed, on a post road from London to Penryn, Cornwall, and lying between Bristol and Weymouth. Demand for news had been increased by the 1745 Jacobite rebellion, as well as commerce, and Goadby gained access to significant distribution networks.

In 1753, Goadby inserted the following in his newspaper:

"This is to inform all....in the counties of Wilts, Dorset, Somerset, Devonshire and Cornwall, that the proprietor is ever willing to oblige every single person; but that it is impossible to contrive the circuit of the news carriers, as to take in every house or place; but if the inhabitants of any such parishes were this paper is not at present carried, would be so kind as to send a messenger to any place where it is brought in its usual circuit, for as many papers as are wanted in the parish, the proprietor will allow the person who comes for them a halfpenny on each paper he takes, besides a further allowance upon all the pamphlets, book &c. which he can sell in the said parishes."

According to John Nichols, Goadby made enemies as well as friends by his plain speaking and views. He died after a long illness on 12 August 1778, and was buried in Oborne. He was a religious man and naturalist, and bequeathed an endowment providing for the preaching of a sermon on the first Sunday of May in every year in Sherborne Church on the beauties of nature. As the endowment became too valuable for its purposes, provision for the poor was made with the surplus.

The printing business was continued, by Goadby's wife Rachel to her death in 1790. It was then taken over by Samuel Goadby, Robert's brother.

== Printer and publisher ==
Goadby's major production was the Illustration of the Holy Scriptures, in three large folio volumes (1759).

Other publications were:

- Two Humorous Novels (1741), free translations from Miguel de Cervantes in the prose satire genre. The translations, attributed to Goadby himself, are from the Novelas ejemplares, and follow earlier work in English by Samuel Croxall and John Ozell, and at points are selective or reticent.
- The Christian's Instructor and Pocket Companion, extracted from the Holy Scriptures, compiled by Goadby, and approved by Bishop Thomas Sherlock.
- Apology for the Life of Bamfylde Moore Carew (1749), often reprinted. This book was a joint publication with the London printer William Owen, and was based on Carew's memoirs that had been published in 1745 at Exeter. A preface fabricated a controversy with Henry Fielding over a "gipsy king" scene in Tom Jones. The preface has been attributed to William Douglas the physician and satirist, and 19th-century sources claimed that Rachel Goadby, Robert's wife, had taken down Carew's dictated memoirs. Authorship of the Apology has been attributed to Goadby and Owen.
- The Universe Displayed.
- A Rational Catechism on the Principles of Religion drawn from the Mind itself
- Goadby's British Biography.
- A new display of the beauties of England; or A description of the most elegant or magnificent public edifices, royal palaces, noblemen's and gentlemen's seats, and other curiosities, natural or artificial, 1773-1776, two volumes with three editions published between 1773 and 1777, followed by a new and enlarged edition in 1787
