= Osidge =

Area in London, England

Coordinates: 51.6345°N 0.1423°W

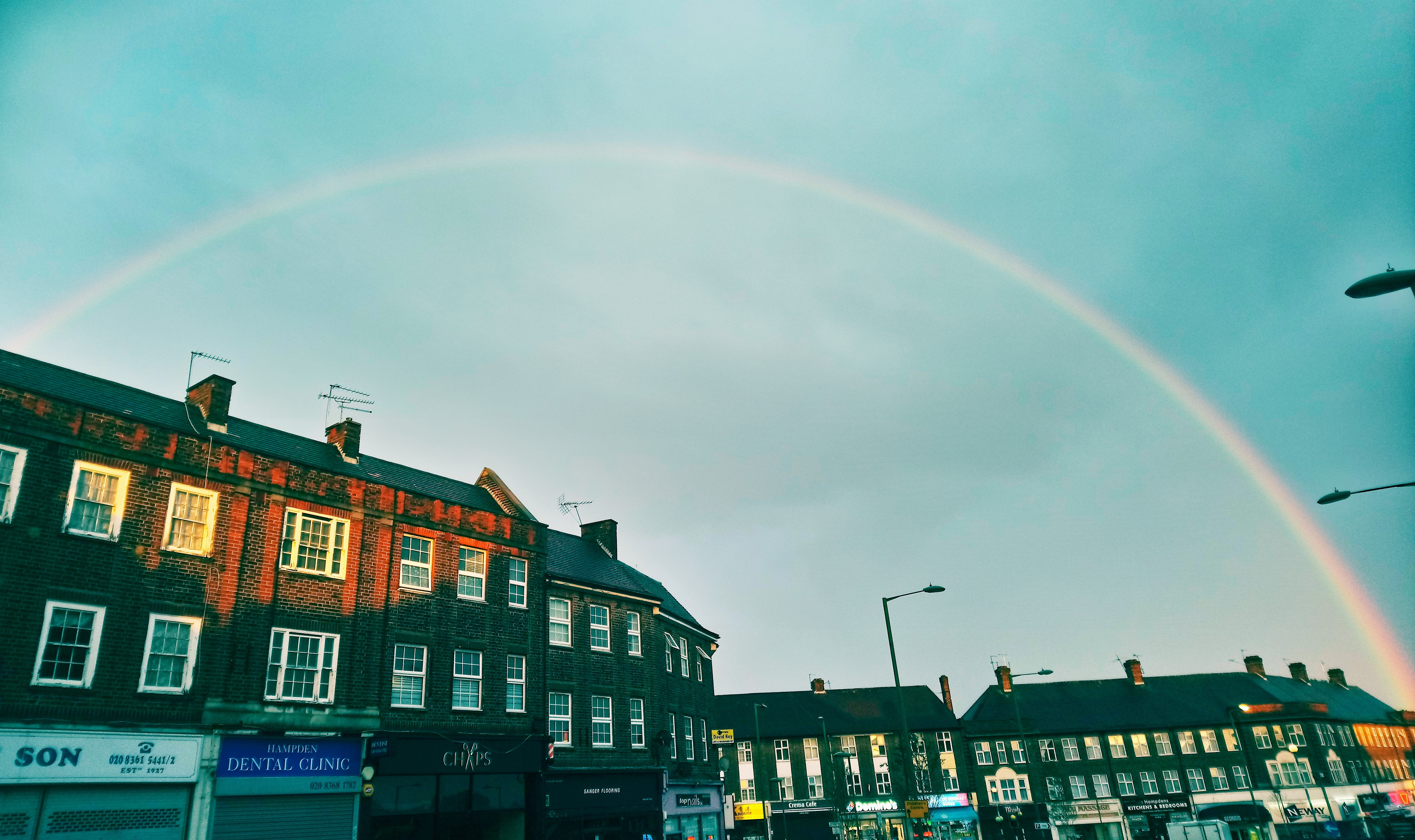
- Hampden Square, Osidge

- Location within Greater London
- OS grid reference: TQ285945
- Ceremonial county: Greater London
- Region: London
- Country: England
- Sovereign state: United Kingdom
- Post town: LONDON
- Postcode district: N14
- Dialling code: 020
- Police: Metropolitan
- Fire: London
- Ambulance: London
- UK Parliament: Chipping Barnet

Osidge is a district in the London Borough of Barnet, between Brunswick Park and Southgate, just west of the border with the London Borough of Enfield. It may be loosely defined as the part of postal district N14 that is in Barnet. Osidge has no formal border and is entirely enclosed within the electoral ward of Brunswick Park, East Barnet; however Oak Hill Park forms a natural boundary to the north and Pymmes Brook to the west, with the A111 to the east and the Piccadilly line to the south and/or east.

The two main roads in Osidge are Osidge Lane and Hampden Way, which meet at a junction (now roundabout) called Hampden Square. Around the roundabout are three parades of shops and the Osidge Arms pub. To the south-west is an area of green belt land, crossed by Pymmes Brook and leading down to New Southgate Cemetery; an adjacent road, Whitehouse Way, provided the backdrop to scenes from Mike Leigh’s film Secrets and Lies. Nearby school Ashmole Academy was a filming location for Kick-Ass 2.

== History ==
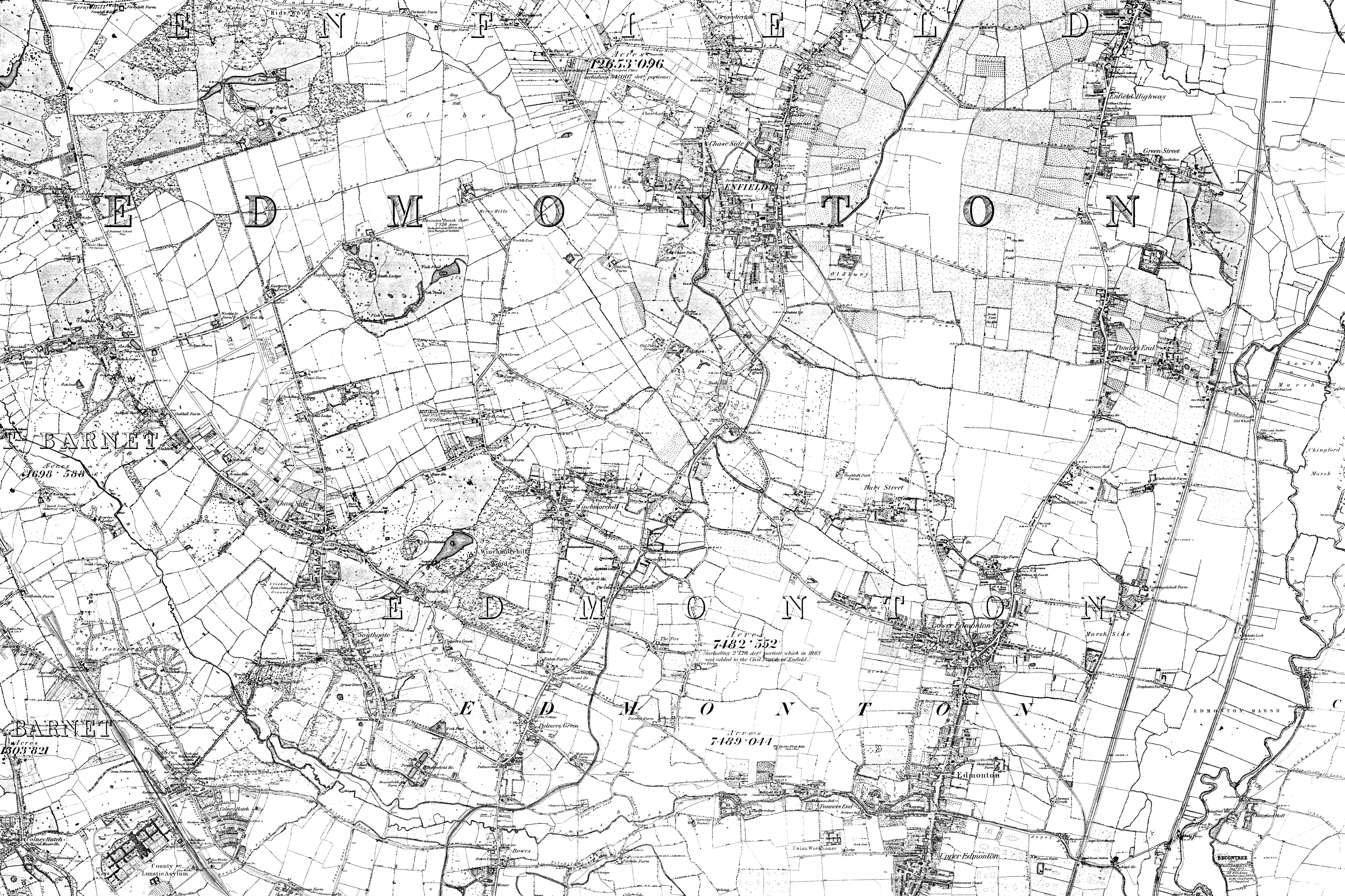
Extract from map of Middlesex, Ordnance Survey, 1868-1883

The name is Anglo-Saxon, probably deriving from 'hawe's ege' referring to the Old English 'hawe' and the boundary (edge) of the Southaw wood. It was first recorded in 1176, in a charter from Henry II to the Abbot of St Albans referring to the abbot's woodland property there, adjacent to the land later known as Enfield Chase. The area was variously named as Huzeog, Hossegge, Huzeseg, Hwzeseg, Ousage, Ouzage, Owsage and Ussage. The land was sold after the Dissolution of the Monasteries and a large house was built and parkland laid out. According to one history, a condition of tenure was that the woods should supply faggots for the burning of heretics. In 1614, the estate passed by marriage to Robert Berkeley, and in 1652 the house became the residence of four generations of the Hadley family. Following the death of John Hadley in 1744 the house was demolished and the estate sold. A new Osidge House was built by 1808 and later occupied by the Lambert and Bosanquet/Bevan families, being purchased by Jacob Bosanquet's nephew Augustus in 1834 and then inherited by his widow, David Bevan's eldest child Louisa. After her death the estate was rented and later purchased by Thomas Lipton.

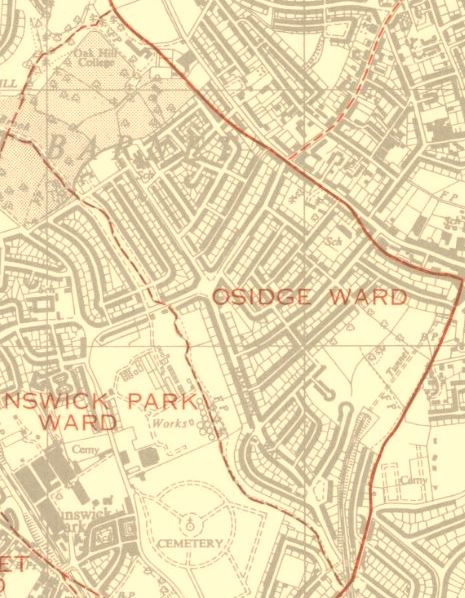
Osidge Ward, 1965

The 1868-1883 ordnance survey shows Osidge as a small rural estate centred around a manor house, adjacent to the Cockfosters Road (now Chase Side, which formed part of the Middlesex/Hertfordshire county border) and to Blind Lane (now Osidge Lane). Within the parish of East Barnet, in the Hundred of St Albans/Herts, Osidge fell under East Barnet Valley Urban District in 1863, renamed East Barnet Urban District in 1935. The area remained rural well into the 20th century with only a small number of dwellings on its borders until suburbanisation in the early 1930s. Osidge was then given formal status as an electoral ward covering an expanded area bounded by Pymmes Brook, Oakhill and the Southgate border, and in 1965 the district was transferred to the London Borough of Barnet. Osidge was one of several Barnet wards abolished for the 1968 local election, becoming part of the expanded Brunswick Park ward.

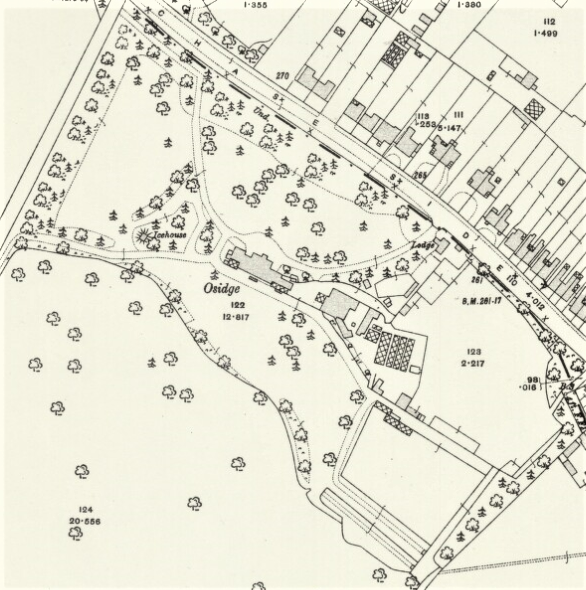
1914 map showing the northern part of Thomas Lipton's Osidge estate

== Notable residents ==
- Sir Robert Berkeley, judge and politician; lived in the original Osidge manor house.
- John Hadley, mathematician and inventor; lived in the original Osidge manor house.
- George Hadley, meteorologist; as above.
- Sir Thomas Lipton, who moved to the current Osidge House in 1893. After his death in 1931, most of his 60-acre (243,000 m^{2}) estate was developed (with housing, as well as Osidge School), but Lipton endowed his house as a hostel for nurses. The Sir Thomas Lipton Memorial Home opened in 1935 and closed in 2014, after which the site was redeveloped as Lipton Close. The former manor house gained Grade II listed building status in 1982.
- Paul Scott (novelist), lived in Hampden Way.
- Amy Winehouse, singer-songwriter, lived in both Osidge Lane and Whitehouse Way as a child, and attended Osidge Primary and Ashmole Academy.

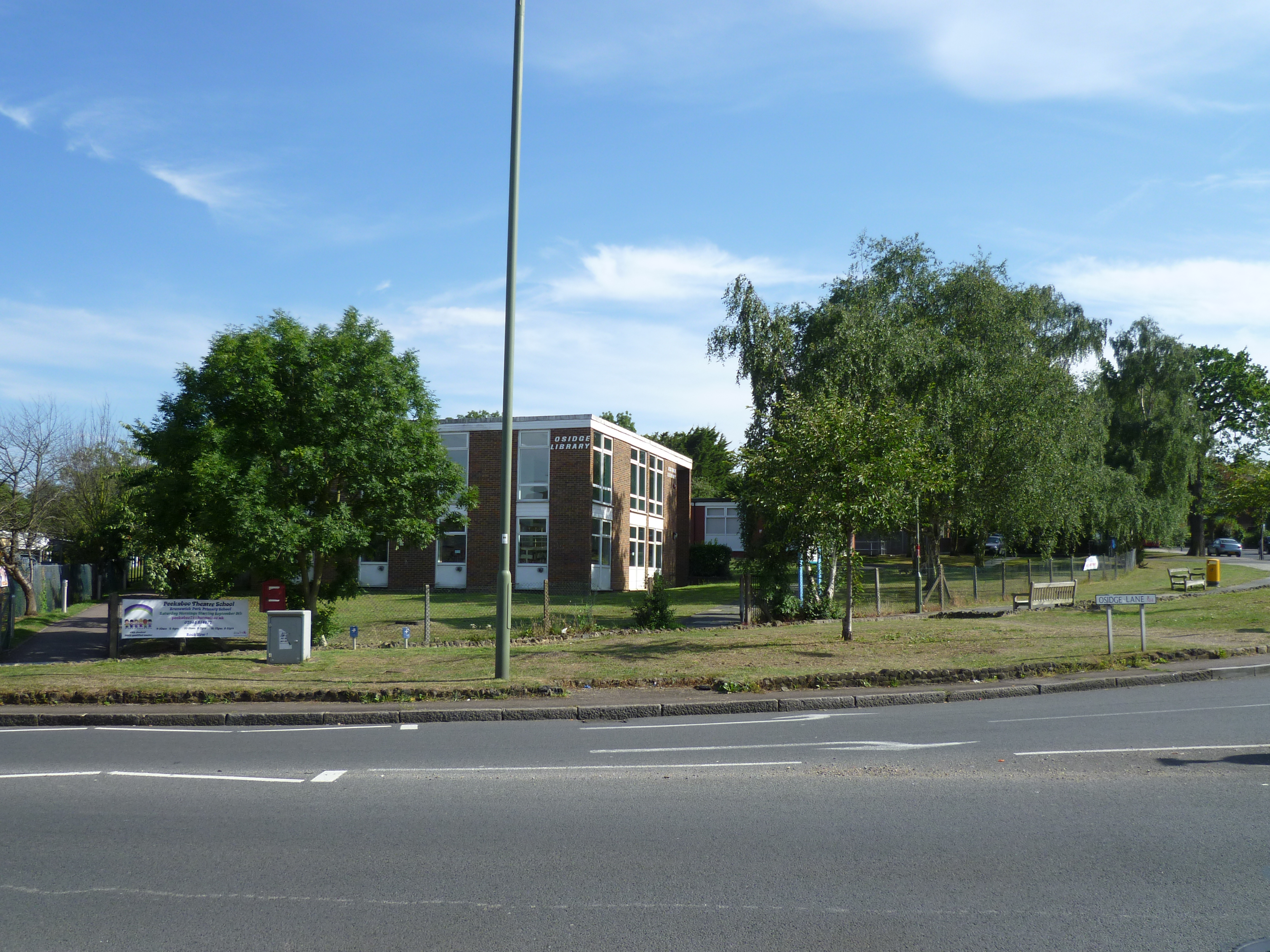
Osidge Library

== Education ==
Osidge is served by Hampden Way Nursery, East Barnet Day Nursery, Osidge Primary, Monkfrith Primary, Ashmole Primary and Ashmole Academy – as well as the nearby Brunswick Park primary school. Osidge Primary made the news in 2005 when chef François Nouaillat, horrified by the quality of the school meals given to his sons, took over the school kitchen. The school celebrated its 80th anniversary in 2016; former alumni include Alan Coren, Rachel Stevens and Dan Gillespie Sells.

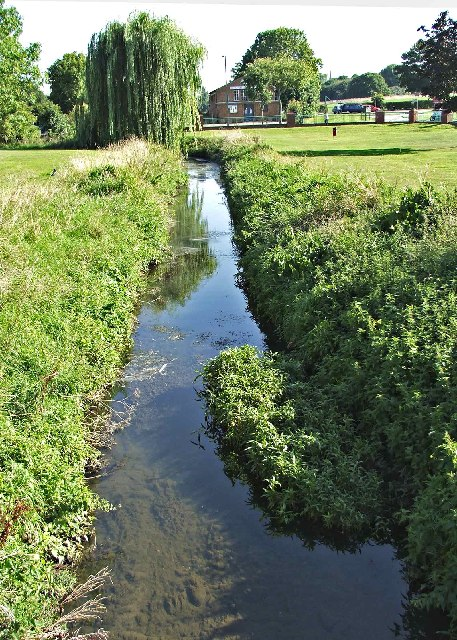
Veterans Hall, Osidge Lane, seen from Pymmes Brook.

== Leisure ==
The 5th East Barnet Scout Group are based on Osidge Lane. Adjacent to the scouts hut is the Veterans Hall, which was home to the Monkfrith Boys Club, operational between 1964 and 2003. The Club hosted live music in the 1980s–1990s, including the debut performance of Barnet band Omega Tribe in 1981.

Osidge also has an eponymous library, situated adjacent to Osidge Lane in nearby Brunswick Park.

== Religious facilities ==
Osidge is served by three C of E parish churches just outside the district: the northern part by St Mary the Virgin, East Barnet, Diocese of St Albans, and the central and southern parts by St Andrew's Southgate and Christ Church, Southgate Green, both Diocese of London. The Christian Communion International has a church on Osidge Lane, in the former Veterans Hall.

== Osidge and Southgate ==
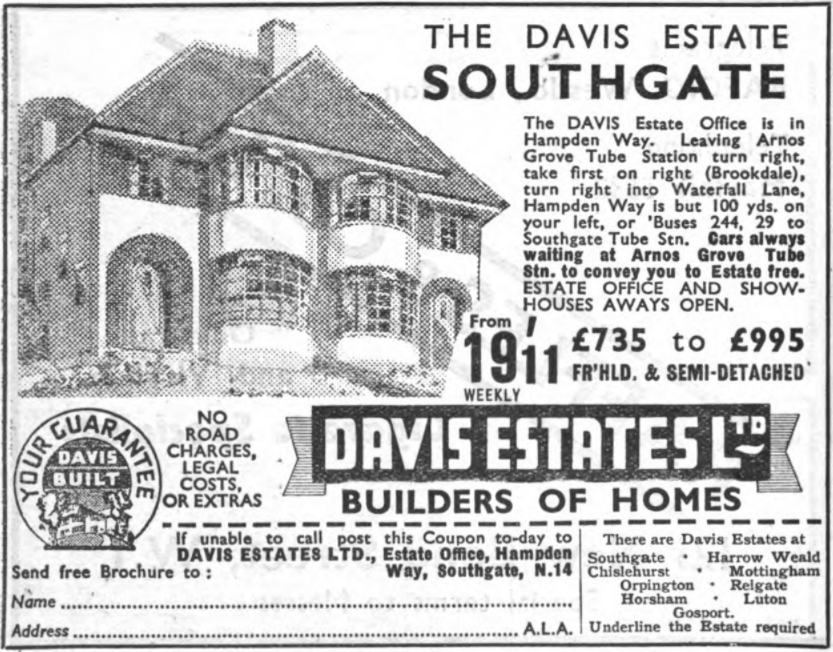

Osidge is not seen as a separate locality by most local residents but is regarded as part of Southgate; addresses are occasionally given as Osidge, Southgate. This is technically incorrect, as the area lies outside the pre-1965 Borough of Southgate and the current parliamentary constituency of Southgate and Wood Green, and has always been in the district of East Barnet. There are several probable reasons for this confusion. Firstly, they are largely in the same postal district, N14 (although so too is Oakwood, and the northern part of Osidge is in the EN4 district). Secondly, Osidge is close to Southgate tube station and to Southgate's main commercial hub on Chase Side. In addition, Osidge House – for centuries the most prominent dwelling in the district – has main access from Chase Side, which formed part of the border of Edmonton Hundred, Middlesex, with Southgate as its nearest village.

St Andrew's Southgate is the closest parish church to Osidge House, and its origins are as a chapel-of-ease to Christ Church, Southgate; in 1902, The London Gazette reported on the granting of a Baronetcy to Thomas Lipton, the first and only 'Baronet of Osidge' giving his address as "Osidge, in the parish of Southgate." The history of Osidge has therefore been covered by local historians of the Southgate area, while also being recorded in histories of East Barnet (such as that by Frederick Charles Cass).

The mid-1930s Davis Estates-led suburbanisation of Osidge saw the district marketed as within Southgate emphasising its proximity to the latter borough and its recently opened Southgate and Arnos Grove underground stations.

Despite this association, a 1992 Boundary Commission Report rejected proposals to incorporate most of the Osidge area into Enfield borough, partly on grounds of objections from Barnet council, local schools and residents that "the Osidge community identified itself with Barnet".
