= Christ the King, Cockfosters =

Priory in London, England

Coordinates: 51°38′42.65″N 0°8′18.4″W

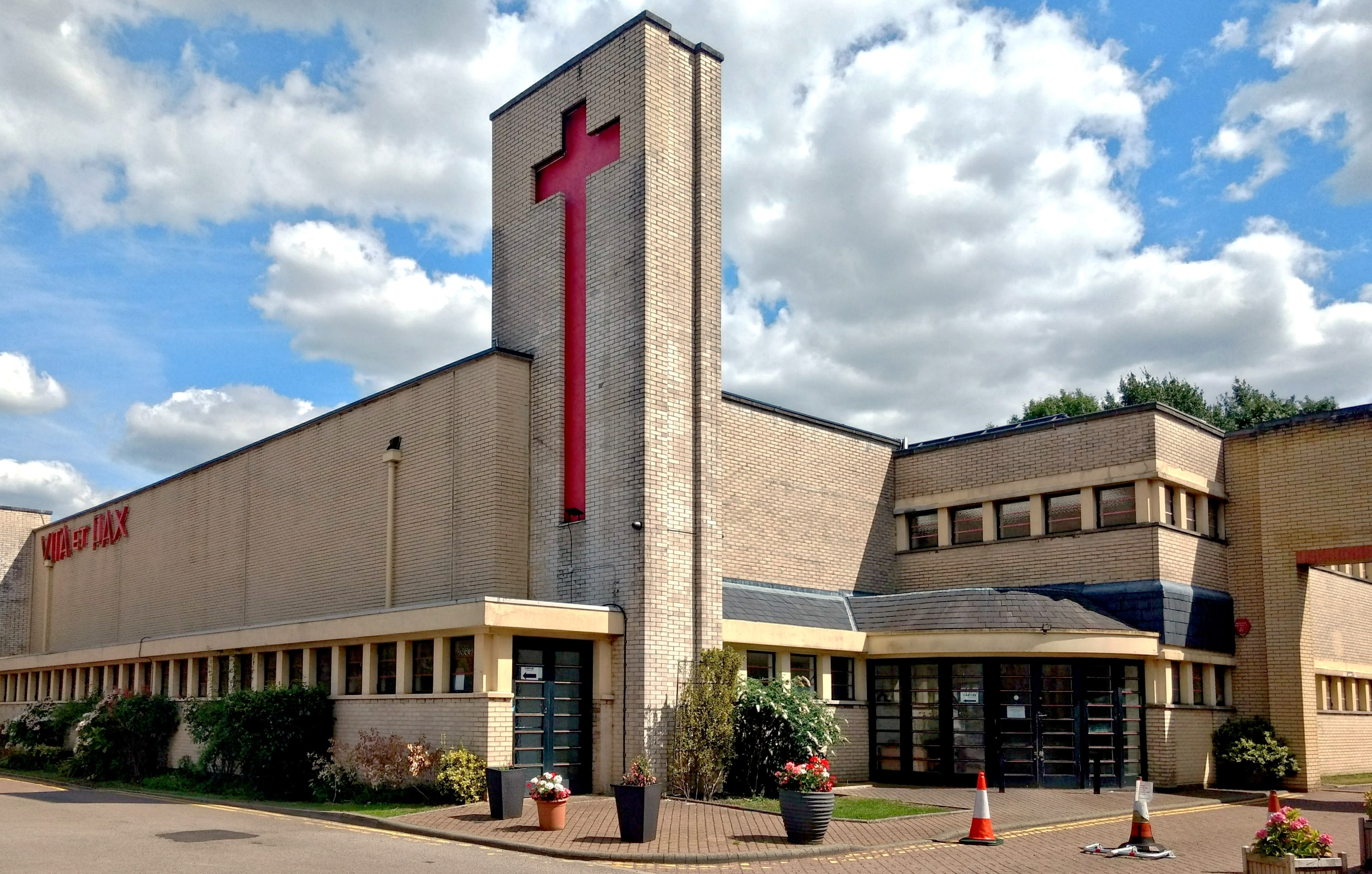
Christ the King, Cockfosters

Christ the King (Vita et Pax) is an architecturally notable former priory of the Olivetan order in Bramley Road, Cockfosters, north London.

== Origins ==
It was founded in 1930 by Dom Constantine Bosschaerts, formerly a monk of the Belgian Province of the Cassinese Congregation of the Primitive Observance. Bosschaerts has served as secretary to Pope John XXIII and both men were "involved in the establishing of the Vita et Pax Foundation, which embodied ideas of Christian unity." The building is dated to 1940 and its design credited to Bosschaerts in Pevsner.

== The Building ==
The parish church of the Parish of Christ The King in Cockfosters occupies part of the building which was intended to form the parish hall for a larger church.

The reinforced concrete construction is "has historical significance as an early manifestation in England of the influence of the continental Liturgical Movement" and is both simultaneously simple and modern.

Since 2014 the parish has been administered by the Chemin Neuf Community.

Part of the building was later the Benedictine Centre for Spirituality, and is now the Cockfosters Spirituality Centre.
