= Cockfosters =

Suburb of north London, England

Coordinates: 51.6515°N 0.1539°W

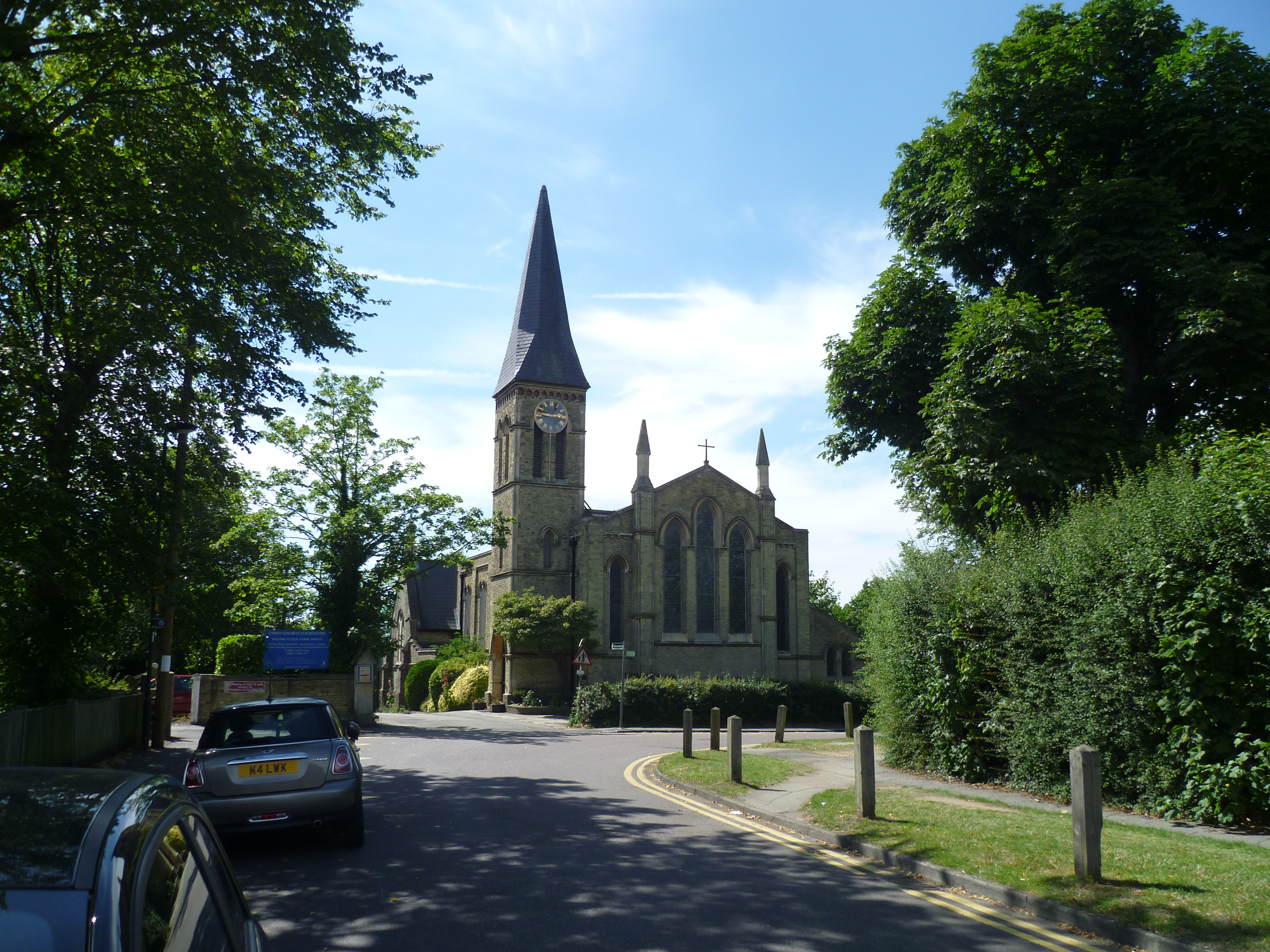
- Christ Church, Cockfosters

- Location within Greater London
- Population: 13,788 (2011 Census)
- OS grid reference: TQ275965
- London borough: Enfield; Barnet
- Ceremonial county: Greater London
- Region: London
- Country: England
- Sovereign state: United Kingdom
- Post town: BARNET
- Postcode district: EN4
- Dialling code: 020
- Police: Metropolitan
- Fire: London
- Ambulance: London
- UK Parliament: Southgate and Wood Green; Chipping Barnet
- London Assembly: Enfield and Haringey; Barnet and Camden

Cockfosters is a suburb of north London to the east of Chipping Barnet, lying partly in the London Borough of Enfield and partly in the London Borough of Barnet. It is 10 miles (16 km) north of Charing Cross. Before 1965, it was in the counties of Middlesex and Hertfordshire.

== History ==
The name was recorded as far back as 1524 and is thought to be either the name of a family or that of a house which stood on Enfield Chase. One suggestion is that it was "the residence of the cock forester (or chief forester)".

Much of early Cockfosters was built around two country estates built on land that had formerly been part of Enfield Chase before its enclosure in 1777: Beech Hill Park, built by Francis Russel and Trent Place, built by Richard Jebb. By 1867, a village had developed along Cockfosters Road, including Christ Church and The Cock on Chalk Lane. The Belomont estate, later known as Heddon Court was also built about this time.

Cockfosters grew little until the Piccadilly Line arrived in July 1933, which brought a housebuilding boom. During the Second World War, Cockfosters was notable for hosting senior German prisoners of war in what became known as the "Cockfosters cage" at Trent Park.

== Education ==
A number of schools are located in Cockfosters and its immediate surroundings:

=== Secondary schools ===
- Southgate School is located on Sussex Way.
- East Barnet School is located in Chestunt Grove, a turning off Cat Hill.

=== Primary schools ===
- Trent C of E Primary School is located on Church Lane, an alley between Chalk Lane and Mount Pleasant.
- De Bohun Primary School is located on Green Road.

=== Special schools ===
- Oaktree school is located toward the north end of Chase Side, near Cockfosters Roundabout.

=== Higher education ===
- The Chickenshed Theatre Company (see theatre and arts section) offers a level 3 BTEC course in performing arts, as well as a foundation degree or BSc in inclusive performance.
- The Hornsey School of Art opened a campus at the top of Cat Hill, on Cockfosters Roundabout, in 1969. The site later merged with Middlesex Polytechnic (later Middlesex University) but it closed down in 2011 and the land was sold to the L&Q housing association. This site is now the Bolingbroke Park housing estate.
- The Trent Park College of Education provided teacher training in Trent Park from its founding in 1947 until it was taken over by Middlesex Polytechnic in September 1974. The campus hosted the performing arts, teacher education, humanities, product design and engineering, television production, and biological science departments, as well as the Flood Hazard Research Centre, until it closed in October 2012.

== Theatre and the arts ==
The Chickenshed Theatre Company, founded in 1975 in a chicken shed before relocating to its current site, originated the concept of inclusive theatre.

== Sport and leisure ==
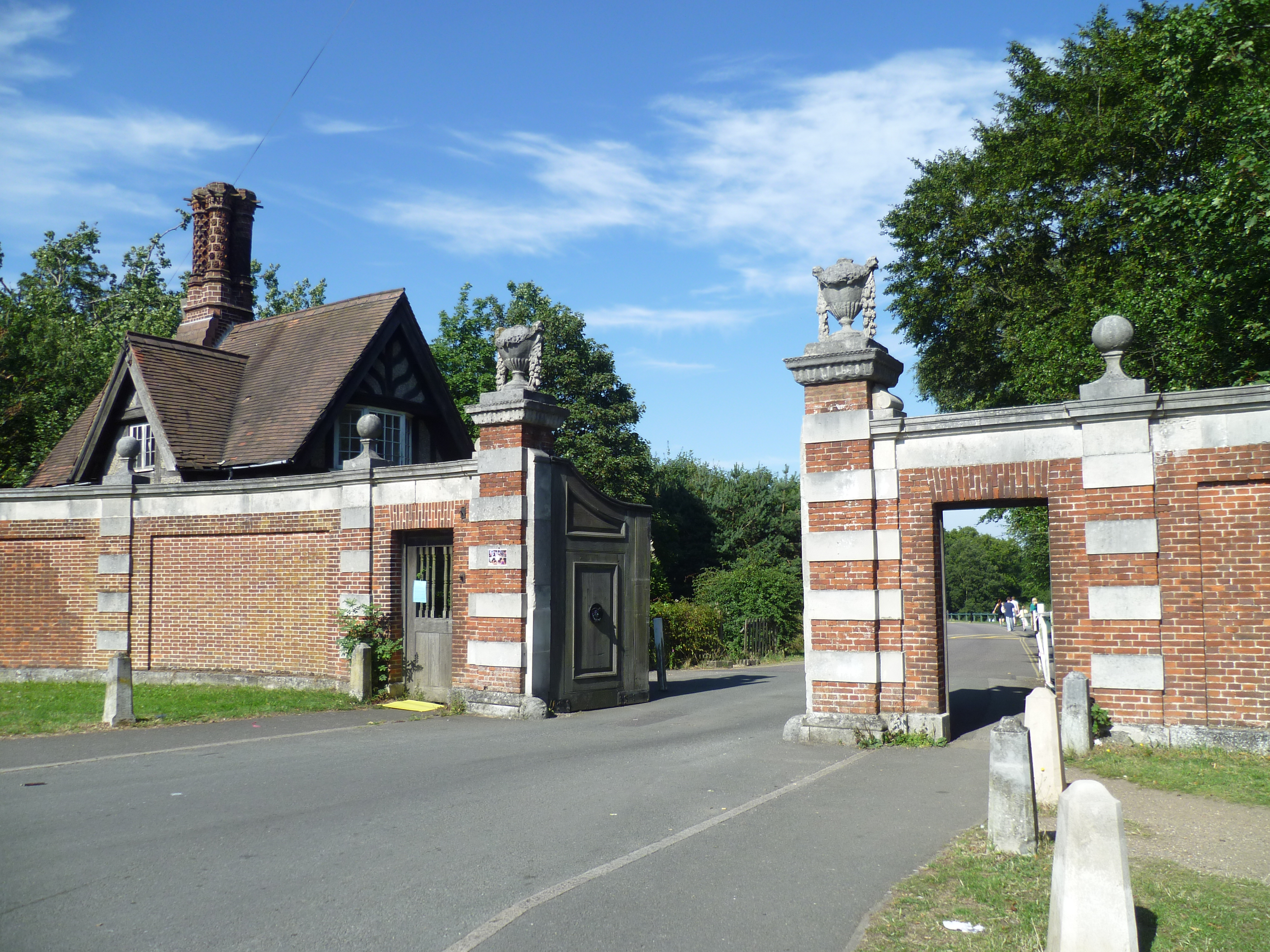
Entrance to Trent Country Park from Cockfosters Road.

Cockfosters has a non-League football club, Cockfosters F.C., which plays at the Cockfosters Sports Ground.

The Saracens used to play at Bramley Road (also known as de Bohun Park and Clocktower Park); however, they are now based in Hendon. The ground is still used for Enfield F.C. training and for the Saracens' 'B' team, Saracens Storm. It is also used as Saracens Amateurs' training ground.

Cockfosters Cricket Club and Southgate Compton Cricket Club play at Chalk Lane on fields adjacent to Christ Church, either side of Cockfosters Bowling Club.

Trent Country Park covers approximately 320 hectares (790 acres; 1.2 square miles) and features treetop adventure park Go Ape.

The Cock Inn (formerly the Cock), off Cockfosters Road on Chalk Lane, opened in 1798.

== Demographics ==
Cockfosters has its own electoral ward in the Enfield borough. The 2011 census of Cockfosters ward counted a population of 16,137. The ethnic composition was 73.7% white (51.7% British, 19.7% Other, 2.2% Irish), 13.5% Asian (6.5% Indian), and 8% black (2.9% African). The most spoken foreign languages were Turkish and Greek. Fifty per cent of the population were Christians, with Muslims and Jews forming 10% and 9% respectively. Of the 5,215 households, 3,219 resided in a whole house or bungalow; 68.8% of home tenures were owned, with minorities of privately rented and socially rented homes. Of economically active people, 4.2% were unemployed. The median age was forty years. The part within the borough of Barnet is covered by the East Barnet ward.

== Religion ==
Christ Church, Cockfosters, an Anglican evangelical church, was founded in 1839. Christ the King, Cockfosters (Vita et Pax), a Catholic church, was founded in 1930. There is also a Welsh chapel, Trinity Church, on Freston Gardens. Cockfosters and North Southgate Synagoge, in Southgate, has held a satellite minyan in Cockfosters since 1969.

== Culture ==
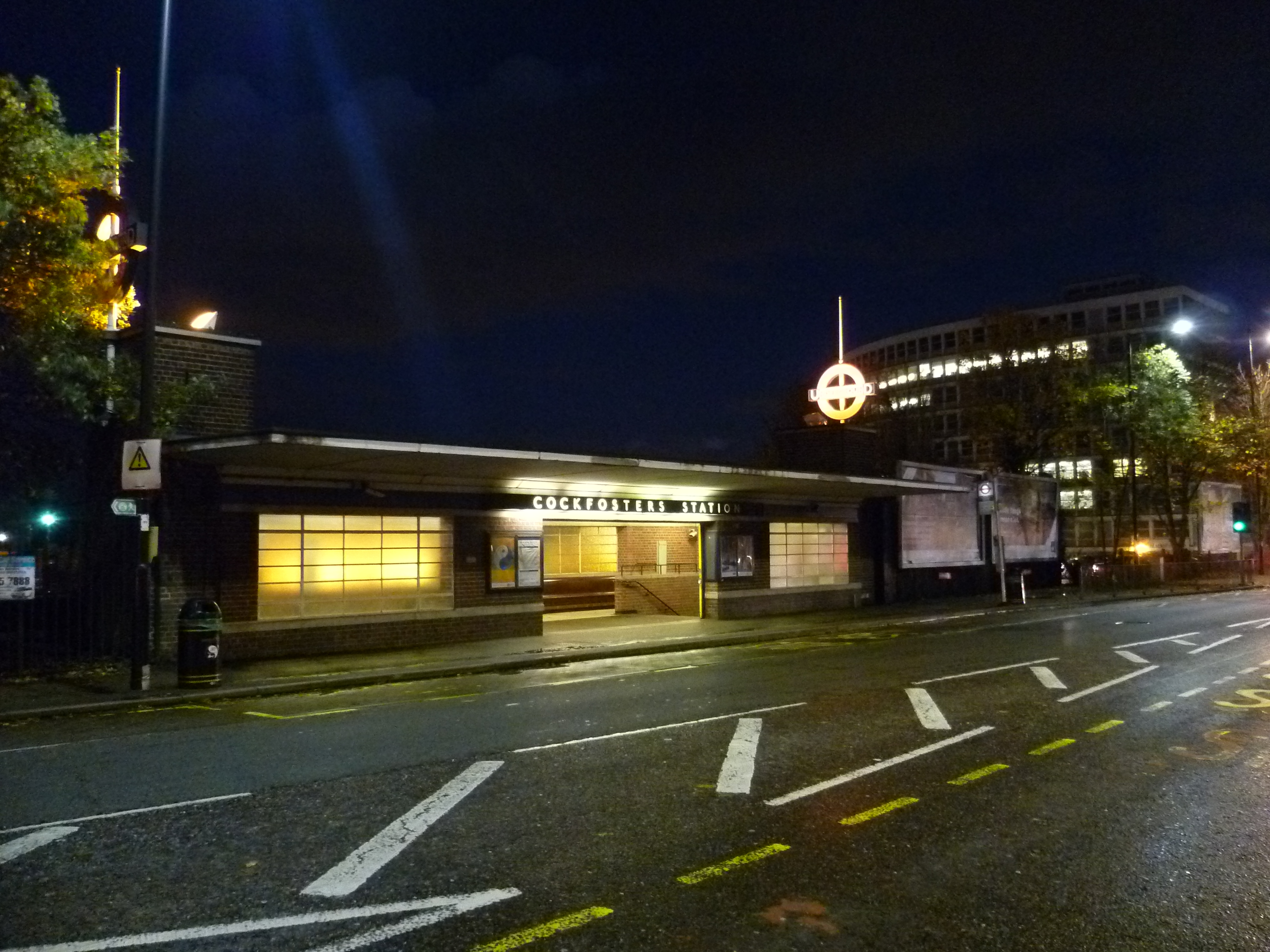
Cockfosters tube station.

Cockfosters is the name of a 2015 short-story collection by Helen Simpson. One of the short stories features a visit to "lost property" at Cockfosters Underground station. The poet John Betjeman, who taught at Heddon Court School in 1929–30, wrote "The Cricket Master" about his experiences there.

== Notable residents ==
- David Burrowes, Member of Parliament (MP) for Enfield Southgate from 2005 to 2017
- George Baillie Duncan ministered at Christ Church, Cockfosters
- Andrew Wingfield Digby (cricketer) was a curate at Christ Church, Cockfosters
- David Evans, Anglican bishop
- Stephen Wookey (vicar and cricketer)
- Cameron McVey grew up in Cockfosters.
- Tommy Docherty (footballer)
- George Eastham (footballer)
- Dave Davies of the Kinks
- Professor John Stollery (engineer)
- Professor Ian Jacobs (oncologist)
- Sydney Etheridge (cricketer)
- Jonathan Hill, Baron Hill of Oareford
- Tony Fitzjohn (conservationist)
- Arthur Dunn (footballer)

== Transport ==
Two tube stations are located within Cockfosters:

- Cockfosters Station is the terminus of the Piccadilly line.
- Oakwood Station is the station before Cockfosters.

Between the two stations is the Cockfosters Depot.

London Buses routes 298, 299, 307, 384, 692, 699, N91 serve Cockfosters.

== Politics ==
Cockfosters is part of the Cockfosters ward for elections to Enfield London Borough Council.
