= Sydney Etheridge =

English cricketer (1882–1945)

Sydney Graver Etheridge (3 November 1882 – 3 September 1945) was an English first-class cricketer active 1908–10 who played for Middlesex. He was born in Cockfosters; died in Barnet.
