= Stephen Wookey =

English cricketer and vicar

Personal information
- Full name: Stephen Mark Wookey
- Born: 2 September 1954 (age 72); Upavon, Wiltshire, England
- Batting: Right-handed
- Bowling: Right-arm medium

Domestic team information
- Years: Team
- 1974–1978: Wiltshire
- 1976–1976: Cambridge University
- 1978–1980: Oxford University

Career statistics
Competition	First-class
Matches	19
Runs scored	260
Batting average	12.38
100s/50s	0/0
Top score	48
Balls bowled	2,159
Wickets	28
Bowling average	41.50
5 wickets in innings	0
10 wickets in match	0
Best bowling	3/61
Catches/stumpings	5/–
- Source: Cricket Archive, 22 October 2015

Stephen Mark Wookey (born 2 September 1954) is an English vicar who played first-class cricket for Cambridge University and Oxford University.

Steve Wookey was educated at Malvern College, where he played cricket for the First XI. He went up to Emmanuel College, Cambridge, playing for the university team and winning his Blue in 1975 and 1976. He then went to the theological college Wycliffe Hall, Oxford, to study for the Anglican ministry. He won his Blue at Oxford in 1978, which was his most successful season, with 11 wickets at 39.18, including three wickets in an innings on three occasions and the dismissal of Geoffrey Boycott, caught and bowled for a duck. He was only the second person, after David Jarrett, to win cricket Blues at both Cambridge and Oxford. He also played a few matches for Wiltshire in the Minor Counties Championship between 1974 and 1978.

Wookey was ordained in the Church of England in 1981. He served at Christ Church in Cockfosters, London; St Michael's Church in Paris; All Souls Church, Langham Place, London; and he was the vicar at St David's Church, Moreton-in-Marsh, from 1996 to 2020. He and his wife Gillian have three children. He wrote the book When a Church Becomes a Cult: The Masks of a New Religious Movement in 1996.
