= Chase Side, Southgate =

Street in Southgate in the London Borough of Enfield

Coordinates: 51°38′40.71″N 0°8′45.94″W

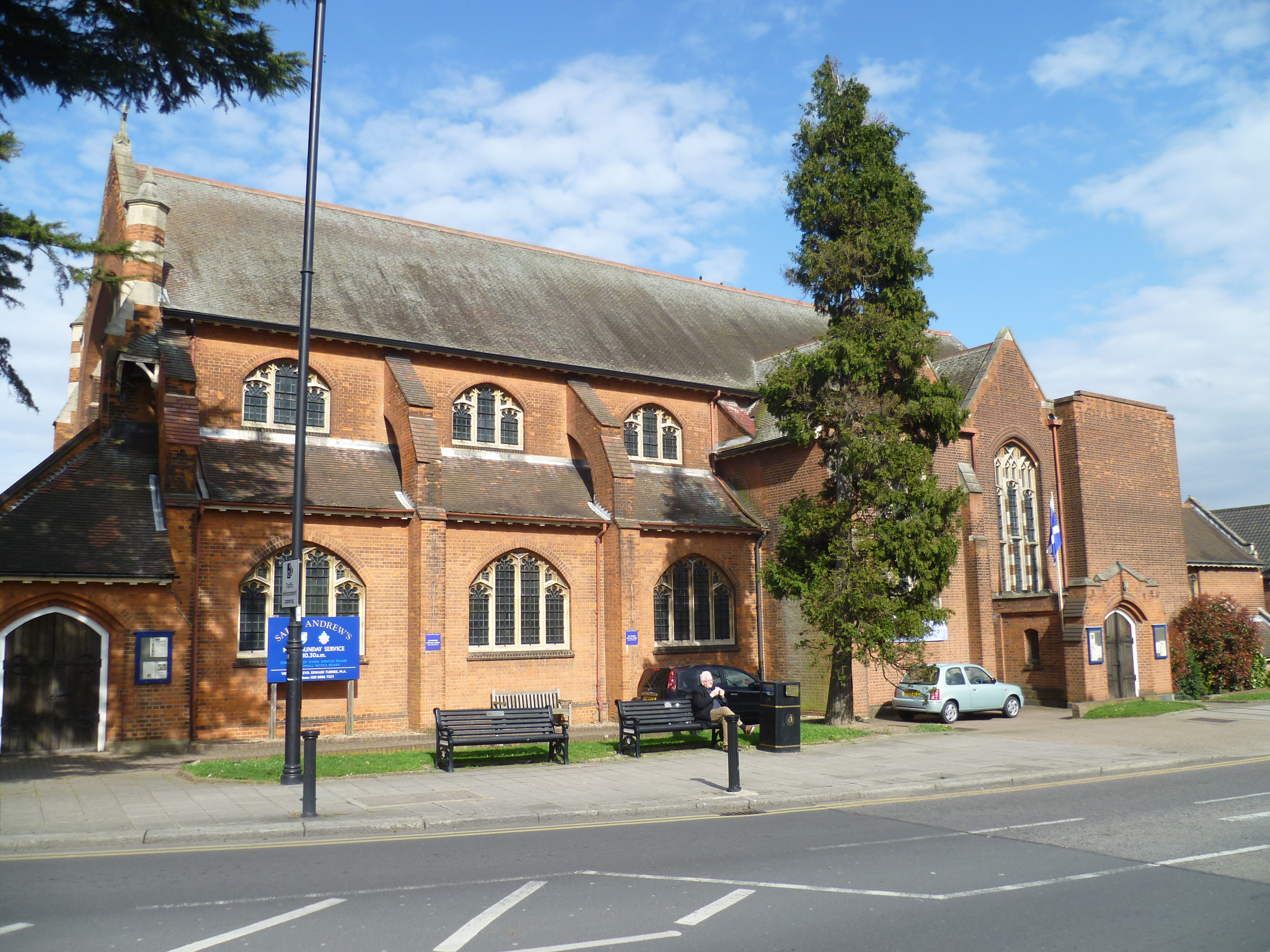
St Andrew's church, Southgate

Chase Side is a road between Cockfosters and Southgate in the London Borough of Enfield. It runs from the junction of Cat Hill, Cockfosters Road and Bramley Road in the north to Southgate Circus in the south and forms part of the boundary with the London Borough of Barnet. Chase Side is named, like nearby Chase Side, Enfield, for its former location adjacent to Enfield Chase.

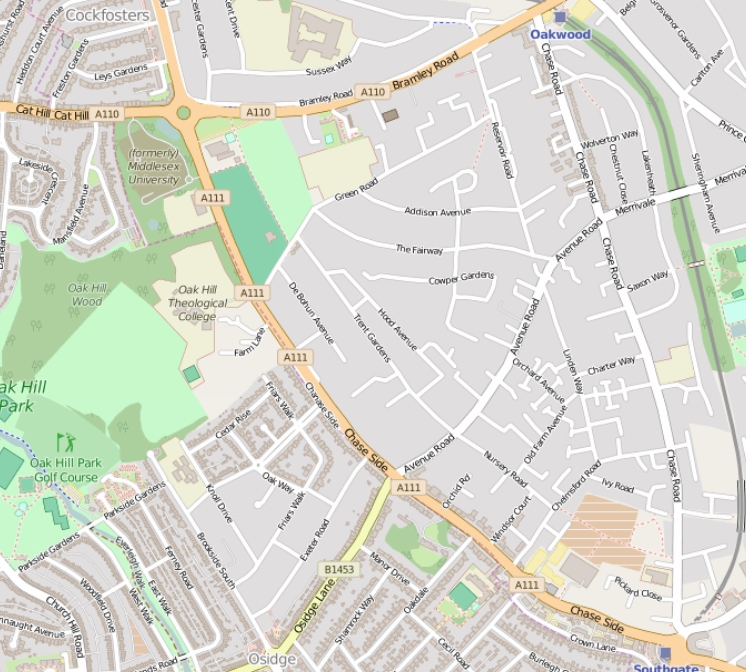
The vicinity of Chase Side.

In the north on the east side are the Chicken Shed Theatre and Bramley Sports Ground. Opposite is the Cat Hill Chase Side Pond and one of the entrances to the housing development known as Bolingbroke Park on the former Middlesex University campus site. Mid-way along the road is the former Sir Thomas Lipton Care Home, aka Osidge House, on the west side. At the southern end is St Andrew's church, Southgate and the main Southgate shopping area. The road terminates at Southgate Circus adjacent to Southgate Underground Station.

== Gallery ==
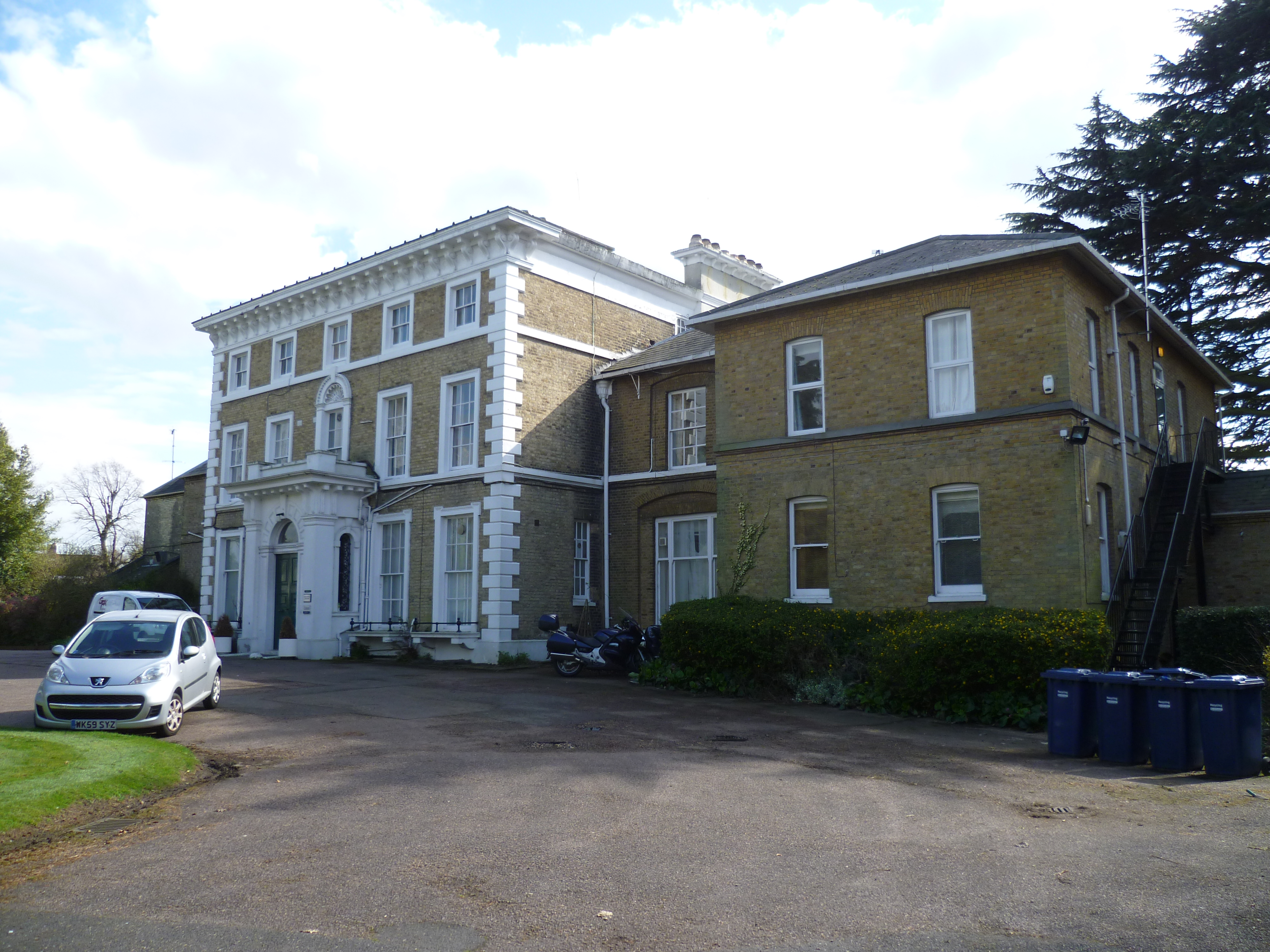
Sir Thomas Lipton Care Home

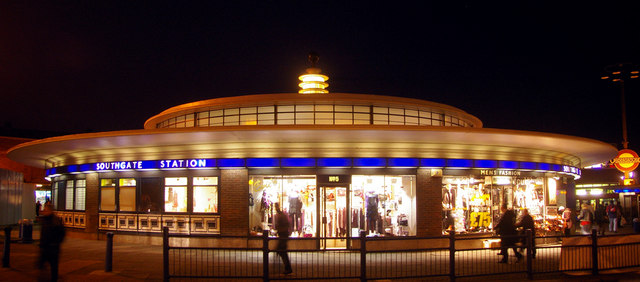
Southgate Underground Station

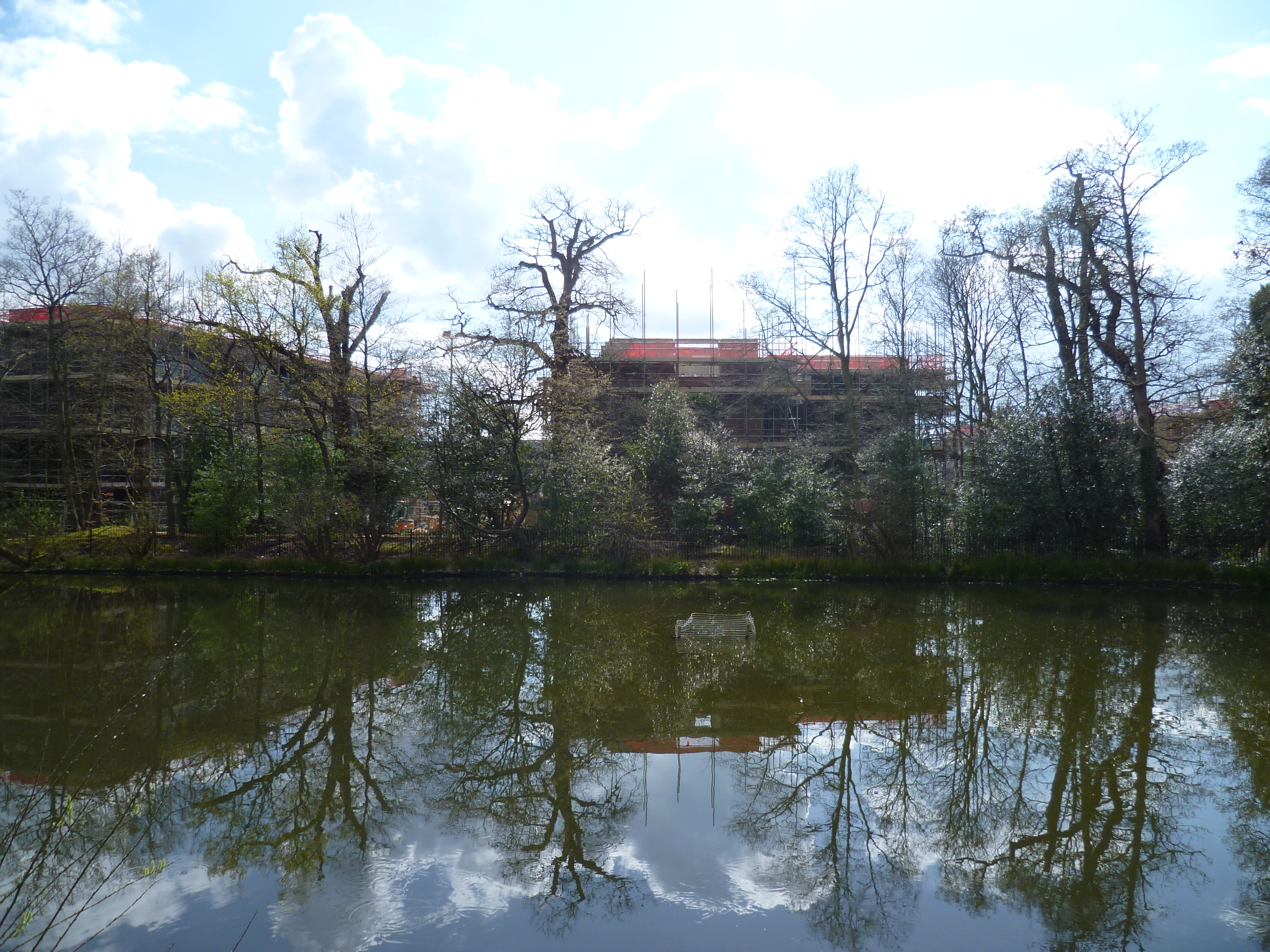
Cat Hill Chase Side Pond
