= St Andrew's Southgate =

Church in Southgate, London

Coordinates: 51.6339°N 0.1323°W

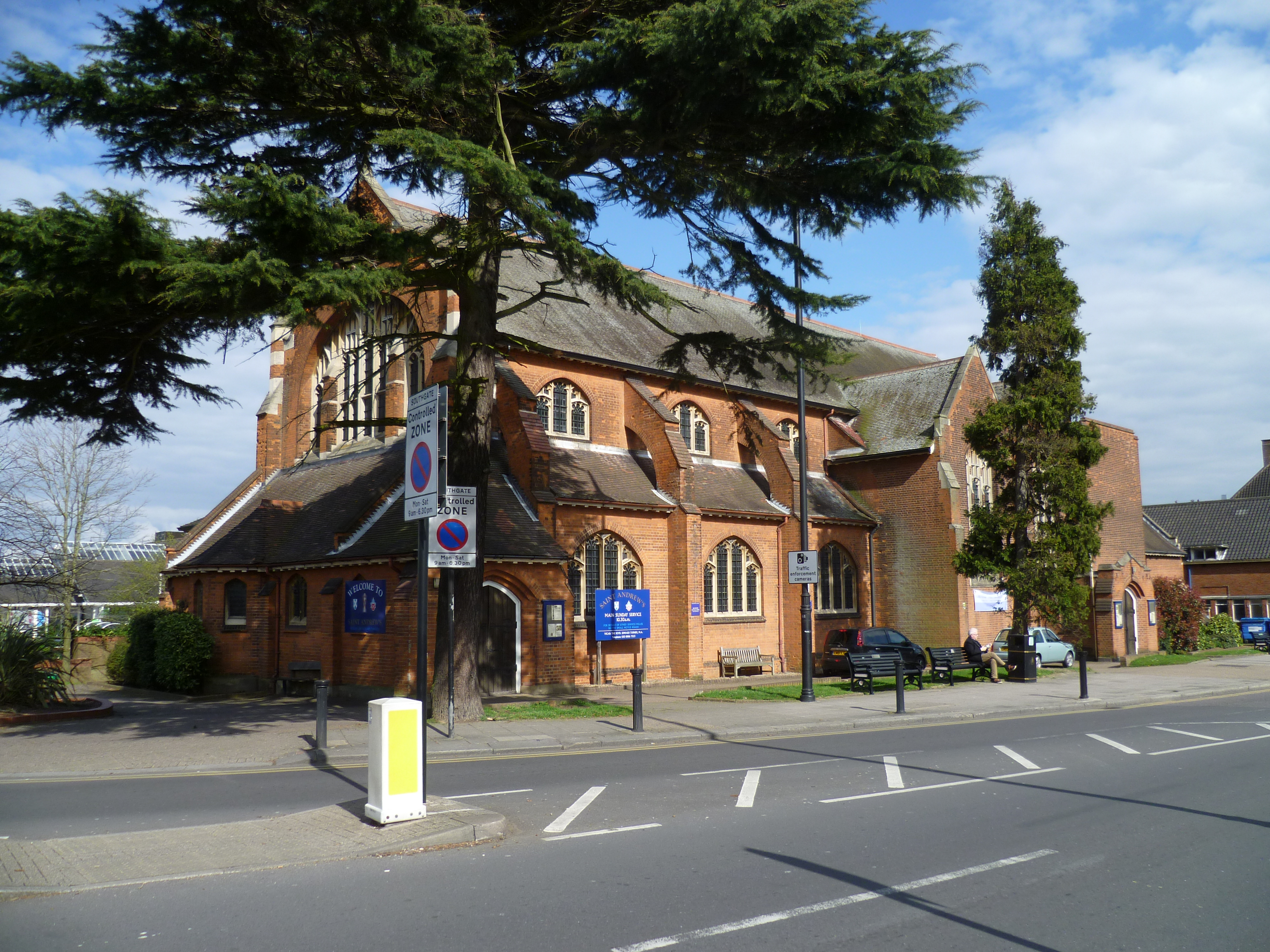
St Andrew's Southgate, west side.

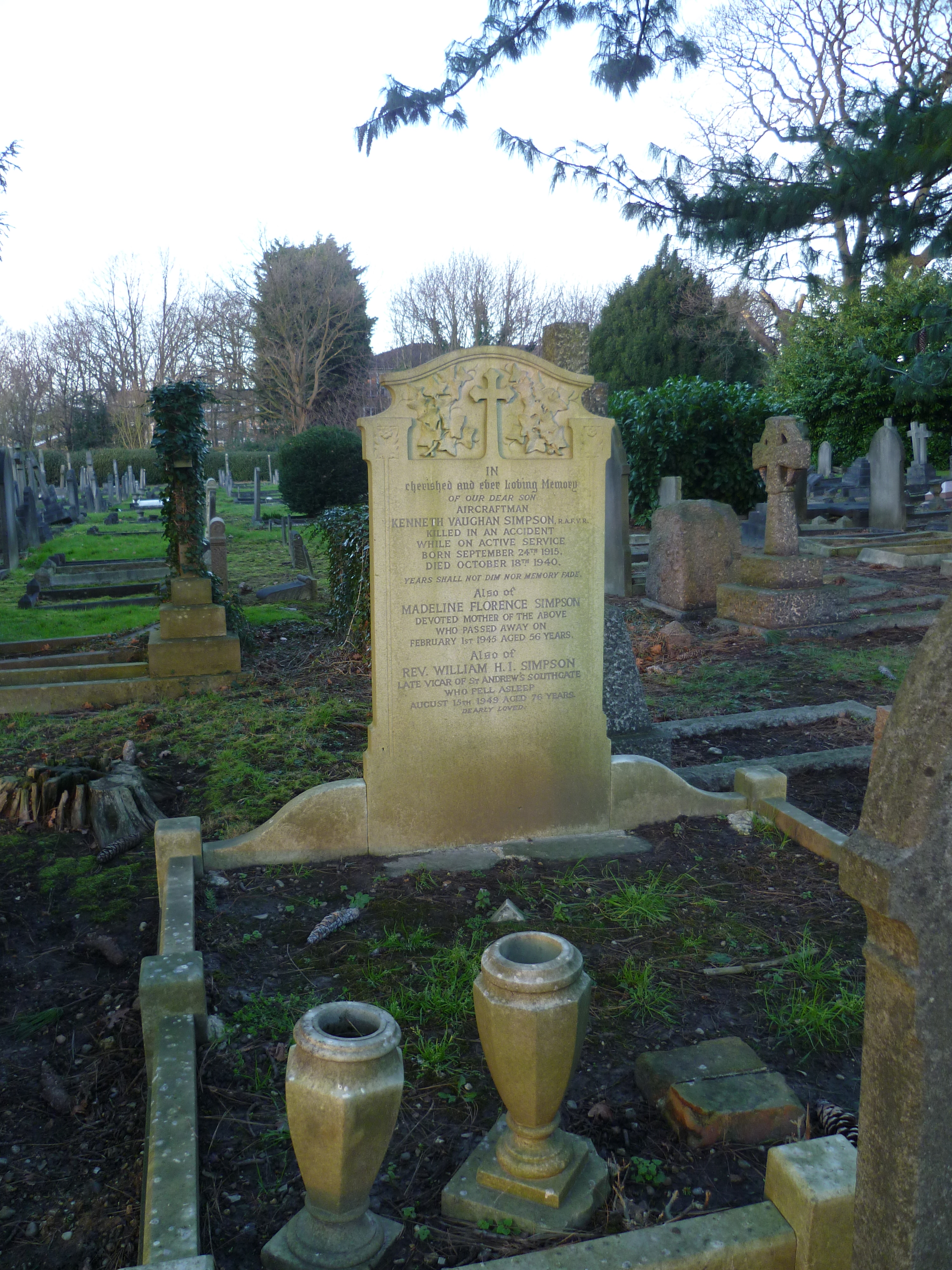
The Simpson family grave at Southgate Cemetery.

St Andrew's Southgate is an Edwardian Church of England church in Chase Side, Southgate, London. It was built in 1903 and consecrated in 1913. It replaced a chapel-of-ease (to the then parish church Christ Church, Southgate) sited in nearby Farm Road since the 1870s, which became known as St Andrew's in the 1890s. St Andrews's gained parish status in 1928.

== Incumbents ==
The reverend William H.I. Simpson (died 1949), first incumbent of St Andrew's, is buried at Southgate Cemetery along with his wife Madeline Simpson and son Kenneth Simpson of the Royal Air Force Volunteer Reserve who died in an accident while on active service during the Second World War.
