= Turkey Brook =

River in the northern outskirts of London

Coordinates: 51.6688°N 0.035°W

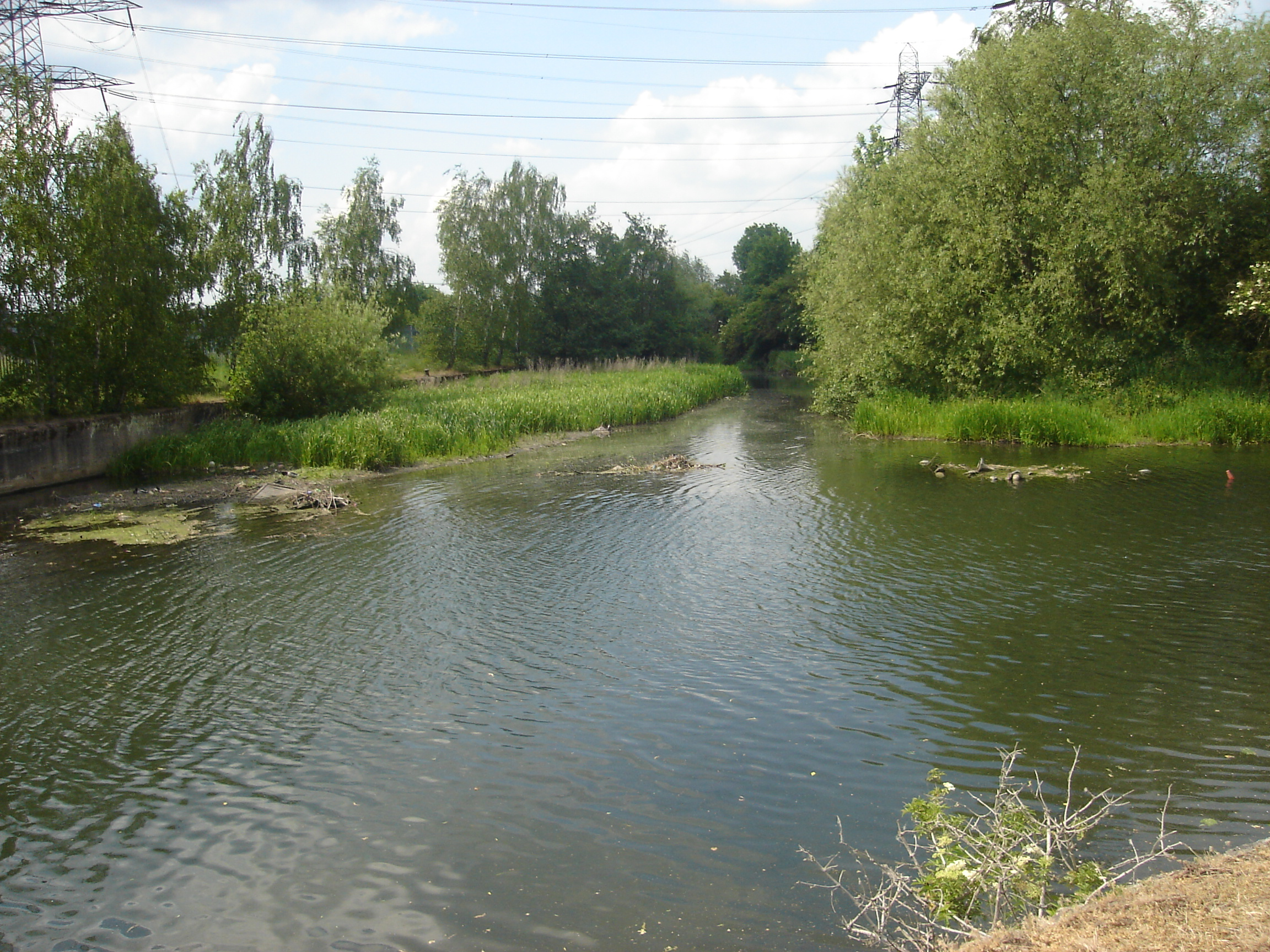
The confluence of Turkey Brook and the River Lee Navigation below Enfield Lock

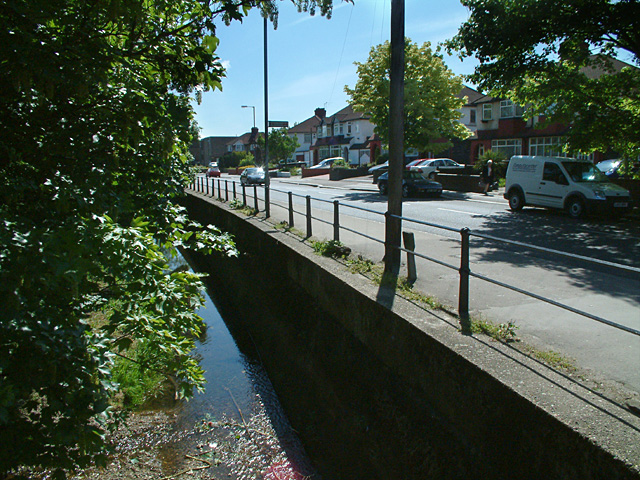
The brook at Turkey Street, Enfield

Turkey Brook, also known as Maidens Brook for part of its length, is a river in the northern outskirts of London. It rises in Potters Bar, Hertfordshire, and flows broadly eastwards to merge with the River Lee Navigation near Enfield Lock.

== Toponymy ==
The brook is named from the hamlet Turkey Street, which is recorded as Tokestreete (1441), Tuckhey strete (1610), Tuckey street (1615), and Turkey street (1805) (probably street of houses, i.e. hamlet, from Middle English strete, associated with a family called Toke or Tokey).

The modern form of the name Turkey, not in use before the nineteenth century, is no doubt due to folk etymology.

== Watercourse ==
The brook rises near the Fir and Pond Woods nature reserve in Potters Bar, and at first flows in an easterly direction. Along its course it is joined by other streams including Hollyhill Brook, Cuffley Brook and the Small River Lea. It flows alongside the M25 motorway and Crews Hill Golf Club, then goes past Clay Hill, Whitewebbs Park, Forty Hill and Albany Park before merging with the River Lee Navigation below Enfield Lock.

== Geology, origin and evolution ==
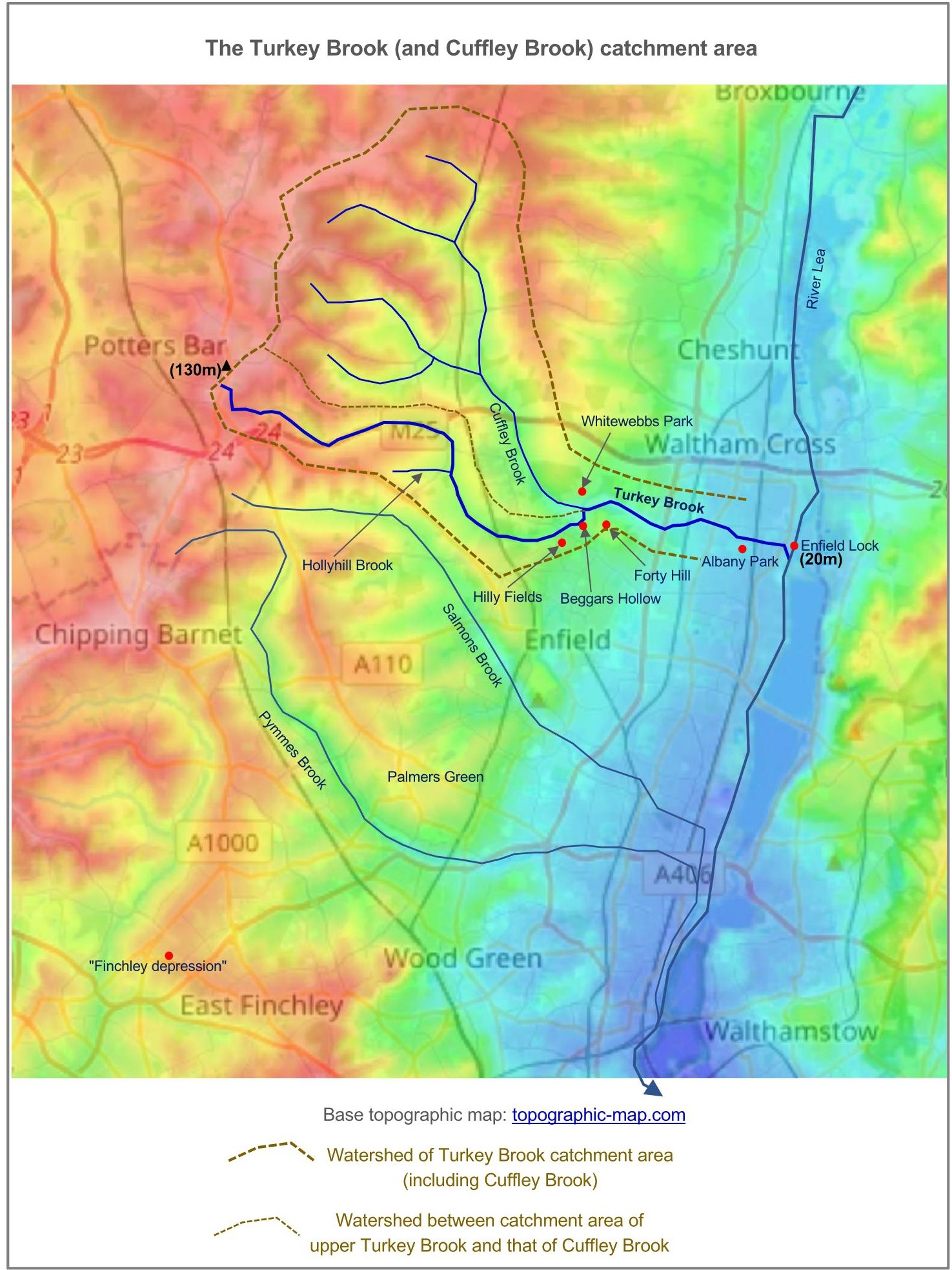
Topographic map of the Turkey Brook catchment area, Hertfordshire and north London

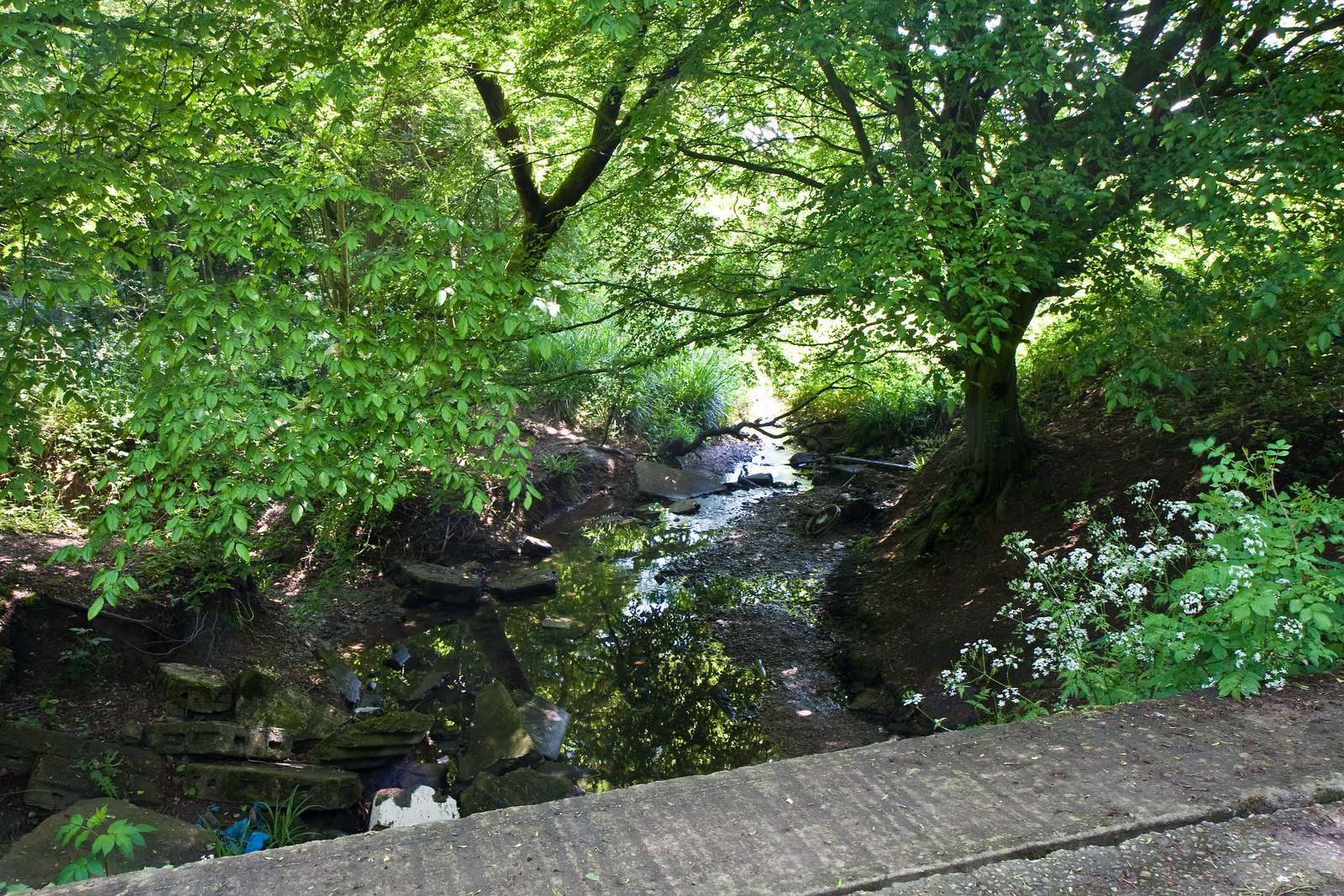
Turkey Brook, a short distance east of its source in Potters Bar (geograph.org.uk).

The main geological formation underlying the Turkey Brook catchment area is Eocene London Clay. In some parts of the higher sections of the catchment area, the London Clay is overlain by "Pebble Gravel" and "Dollis Hill Gravel" (both Quaternary pre-glacial fluvial deposits), and by Quaternary glacial till. Downstream of where Turkey Brook goes under the M25, there are alluvium and sand and gravel deposits on the Turkey Brook valley floor. And east of Forty Hill, the brook crosses extensive Quaternary river terrace deposits laid down by the River Lea.

As a west bank tributary of the lower River Lea, Turkey Brook came into being about 400,000 years ago, after the Anglian glaciation. During that glaciation, ice from the north of England advanced at least as far south as Watford, Finchley and Chingford.

Until the Anglian glaciation, the River Thames flowed north-eastwards via Watford, through what is now the Vale of St Albans, then eastwards towards Chelmsford and the North Sea. As a result of the glaciation, the Thames was diverted to a more southerly route, broadly along the line of its current course.

Prior to the Anglian glaciation, a "proto-Mole-Wey" river was flowing northwards from the Weald and North Downs, through the "Finchley depression" and Palmers Green, to join the proto-Thames somewhere around Hoddesdon, at what is today an altitude of around 60 metres. It was this river which, during the course of the early and middle Pleistocene, deposited the "Dollis Hill Gravel" at successive altitudes.

When the Anglian ice sheet diverted the Thames southwards, the Mole-Wey was cut off at Richmond. Meltwater from the retreating Anglian ice sheet gave birth to a south-flowing lower River Lea, and that river cut into and followed in part the line of the former proto-Mole-Wey. It flowed into the newly diverted Thames, which at that time was spread over a wide flood plain extending as far north as Islington.

And, as the ice sheet retreated, west bank tributaries of the lower Lea, such as Turkey Brook, flowed eastwards and south-eastwards from higher ground running roughly south-north through Potters Bar, down towards the newly formed lower River Lea. They, and their own tributaries, cut down successively through till left by the ice sheet, then through "Dollis Hill Gravel", and then into London Clay below.

It is not known at present whether Turkey Brook, and other west bank tributaries such as Pymmes Brook and Salmons Brook, followed valleys which had been in existence before the ice sheet covered the land, or whether they fashioned a substantially different landscape after the ice retreated. But it is known that today's tributaries of the upper Lea, such as the Rivers Mimram and Stort, follow broadly the same lines as pre-glaciation valleys, so, by analogy, it is quite possible that elements at least of the pre-glaciation topography of the lower Lea basin are reflected in today's relief.

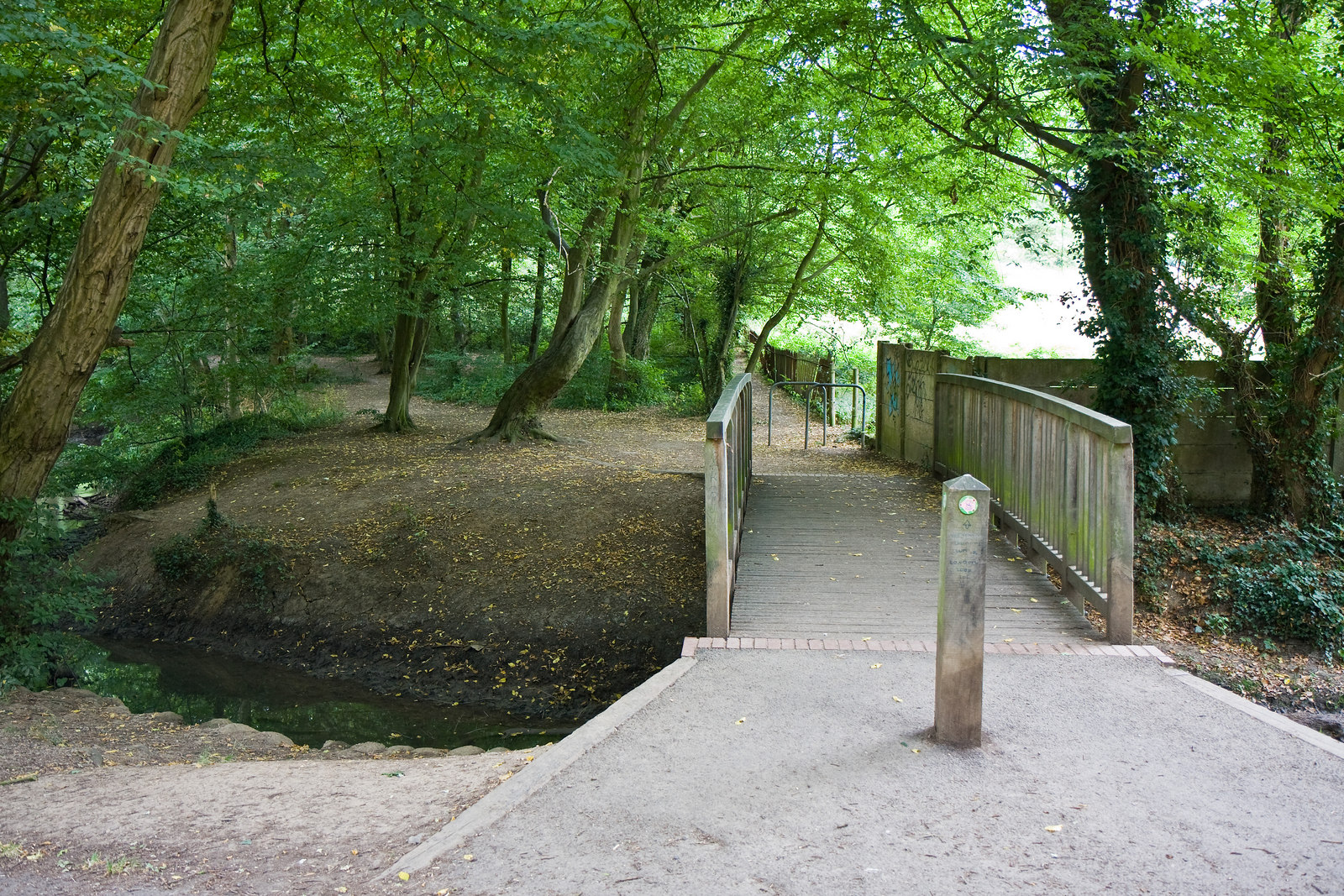
Footbridge Over Turkey Brook in Hilly Fields (geograph.org.uk)

In the case of Turkey Brook immediately after the glaciation, that stream joined the River Lea somewhere around Forty Hill, where there is a deposit of "Boyn Hill Gravel". That gravel, which is on the highest of the river terraces left by the post-Anglian lower River Lea, marks the line followed by the Lea after the retreat of the ice sheet.

During the course of the following 400,000 years, the lower Lea moved steadily eastwards, leaving river terrace deposits of decreasing age and altitude as it did so. Turkey Brook thus extended its course eastwards from Forty Hill, across the valley floor of the lower Lea, past Turkey Street, to where it today flows into the River Lee Navigation below Enfield Lock.

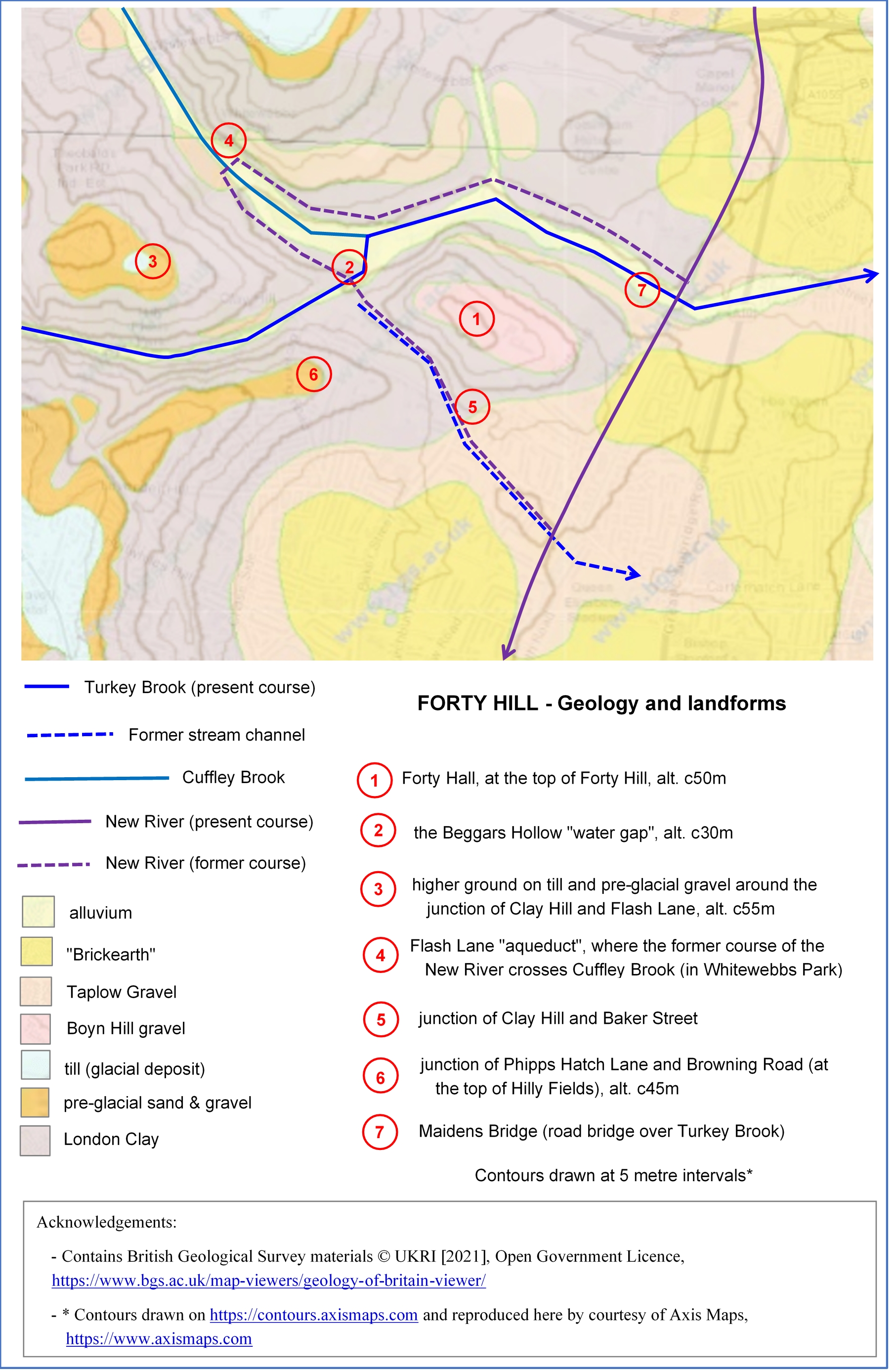
Geology and stream evolution near Forty Hill. Turkey Brook formerly flowed south-east from Beggars Hollow (2) to Baker Street (5) and beyond. As a result of stream capture in the recent geological past, it now flows northwards through Beggars Hollow to join Cuffley Brook north-west of Forty Hill (1).

=== Stream pattern modification near Forty Hill ===
The drainage pattern in this area continues to evolve. In particular, Turkey Brook has, in the recent geological past, changed its course just after Hilly Fields. It formerly flowed south-eastwards, along what is today a "dry" channel along the south side of Forty Hill. Today, it turns northwards through Beggars Hollow to join Cuffley Brook in Whitewebbs Park. From there it continues eastwards, along the north side of Forty Hill.

At Boyn Hill (at a time about 400,000 years ago), Cuffley Brook and Turkey Brook joined the River Lea at points not far away from each other, north and south of where Forty Hall is today, at what is now an elevation of c. 50 metres.

Then the River Lea moved steadily towards the east. And, as a contour map shows, the two brooks each extended eastwards with the Lea, but stayed apart. The Lea and the two brooks cut down into the London Clay (to an elevation today of c. 35 metres), thus defining the north, east and south sides of what was becoming Forty Hill.

The brooks approached each other quite closely either side of Beggars Hollow (close to where, today, the Rose and Crown public house is located on Clay Hill). The dividing line between them was thus lowered by erosion at that point.

Later, the Lea moved further east to its present line, well away from Forty Hill, cutting down to an elevation today of about 20 metres.

The low point between Turkey Brook and Cuffley Brook at Beggars Hollow was breached. Turkey Brook thus changed its course, there to go north-east, through what is defined as a water gap. As a result, Turkey Brook joined Cuffley Brook in Whitewebbs Park and the merged stream continued eastwards along the former course of Cuffley Brook. But east of that junction, the stream is now known as Turkey Brook.

A dry, former stream channel at c. 30 metres was left, running just north of Clay Hill, from Beggars Hollow to a point close to today's junction of Clay Hill and Baker Street. That channel now defines the southern boundary of Forty Hill.

When the New River was built, it followed the 30-metre contour from Hertfordshire south towards London, down the Lea valley. But, in Enfield, the engineers who constructed it took the New River on a loop going west, to the north of Forty Hill, and then across Cuffley Brook near Flash Lane (and, later, across an aqueduct there). From that point, they took it south-east, through the water gap at Beggars Hollow, along the dry channel north of Clay Hill, and down to where Ladysmith Road is today. Then the New River continued on its southward course, towards Enfield Town.

The New River was later straightened to flow southwards continuously, to the east of Forty Hill. An aqueduct was built for the New River to cross Turkey Brook near Maidens Bridge. This left the former course of the New River as it is today, curling through Whitewebbs Park, passing through Beggars Hollow and following the dry channel.

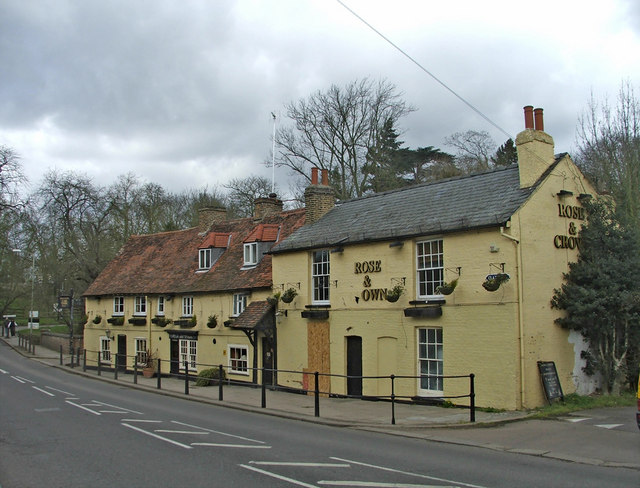
Rose and Crown Public House, Beggars Hollow, Clay Hill, Enfield (geograph.org.uk).

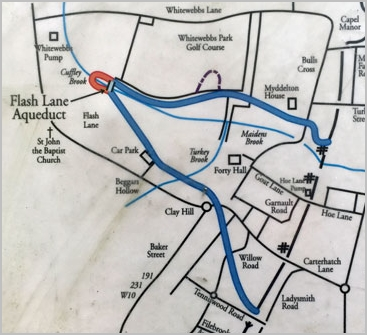
The route (in blue) of the former "Whitewebbs loop" of the New River (from an information board at the Flash Lane aqueduct).

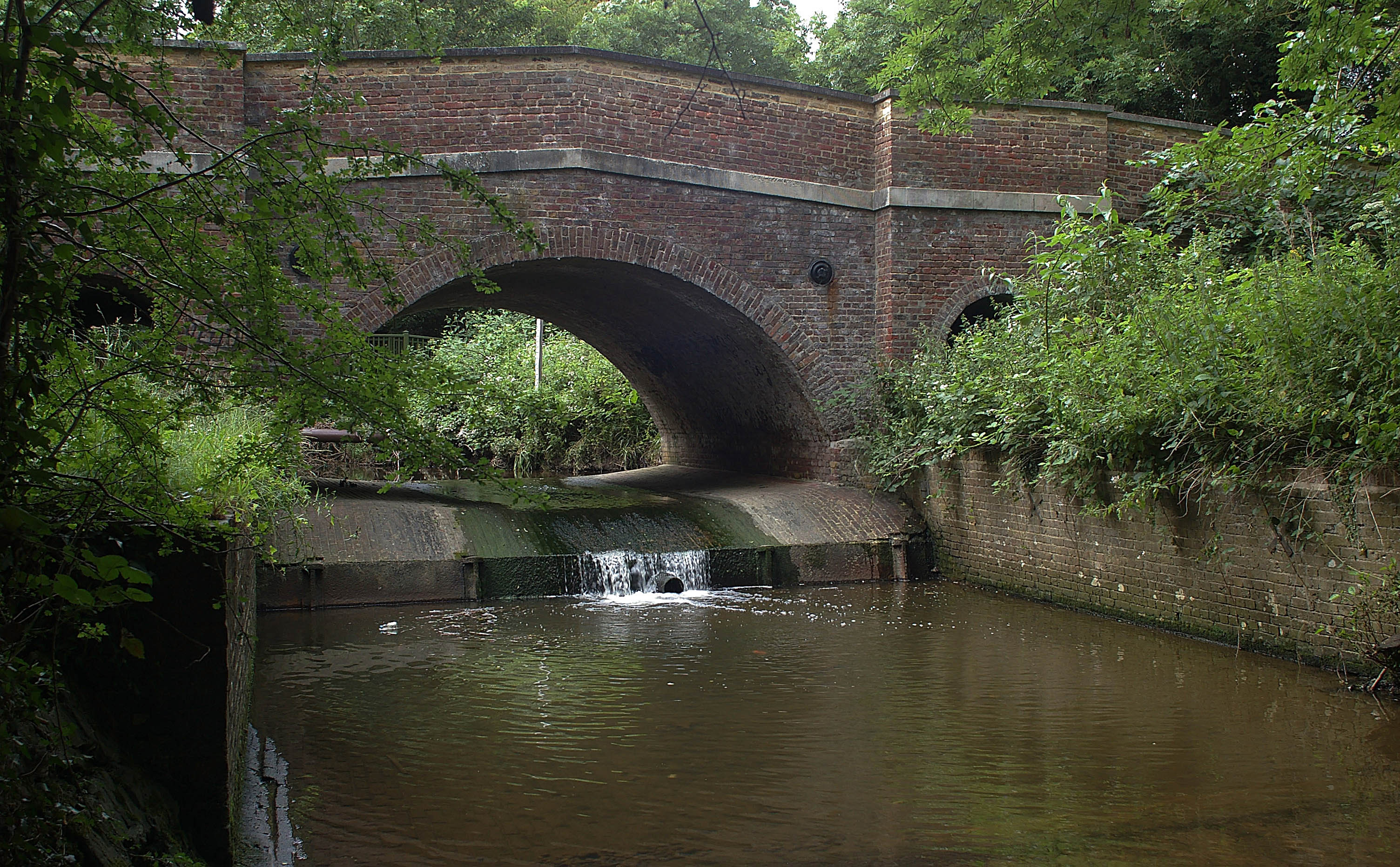
Maiden's Bridge over Turkey Brook, at the north-east foot of Forty Hill (geograph.org.uk).

== Ecology ==
The brook is mostly shallow, fast flowing and clean and can support wildlife. Coarse fish including dace use the brook to spawn.

== Flood risk ==
It is estimated that, along the course of Turkey Brook, there are "an estimated 92 properties in Oakmere (Potters Bar), and 3 near Enfield Wash at risk of fluvial flooding during a 1% annual probability event".
