= Cuffley Brook =

River in Hertfordshire, England

Coordinates: 51.6743°N 0.0787°W

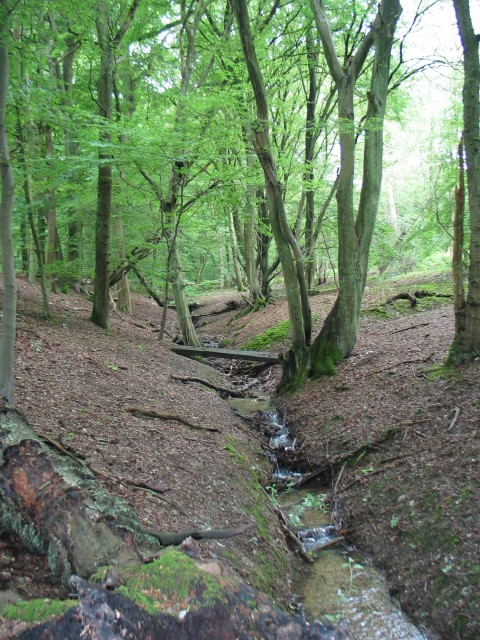
Cuffley Brook, Northaw Great Wood

Cuffley Brook is a tributary of Turkey Brook. It runs through parts of Hertfordshire and the London Borough of Enfield, England. After the confluence of the two streams in Whitewebbs Park, the watercourse continues eastwards as Turkey Brook to join the River Lea near Enfield Lock.

== Course ==
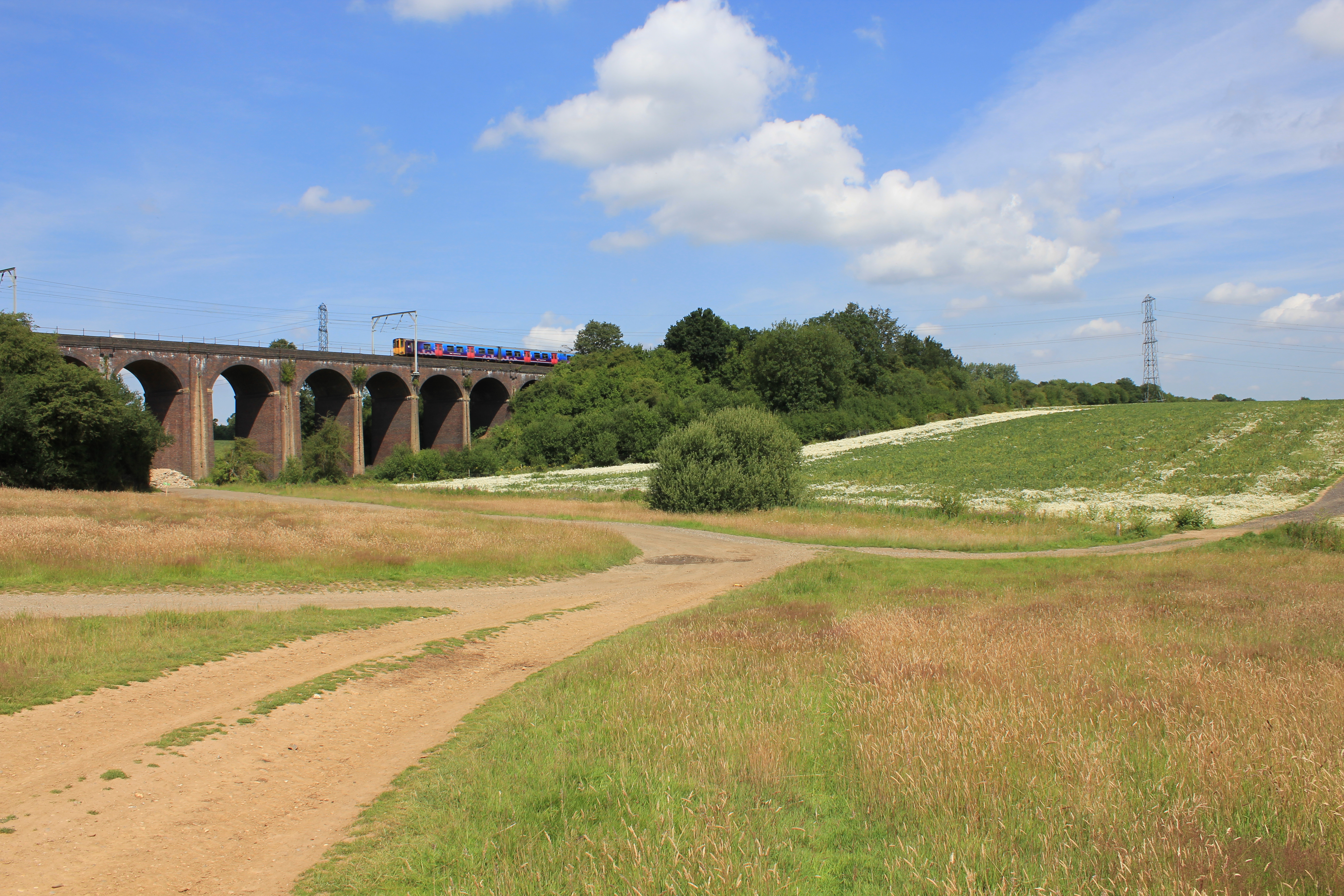
Soper's Viaduct, Cuffley

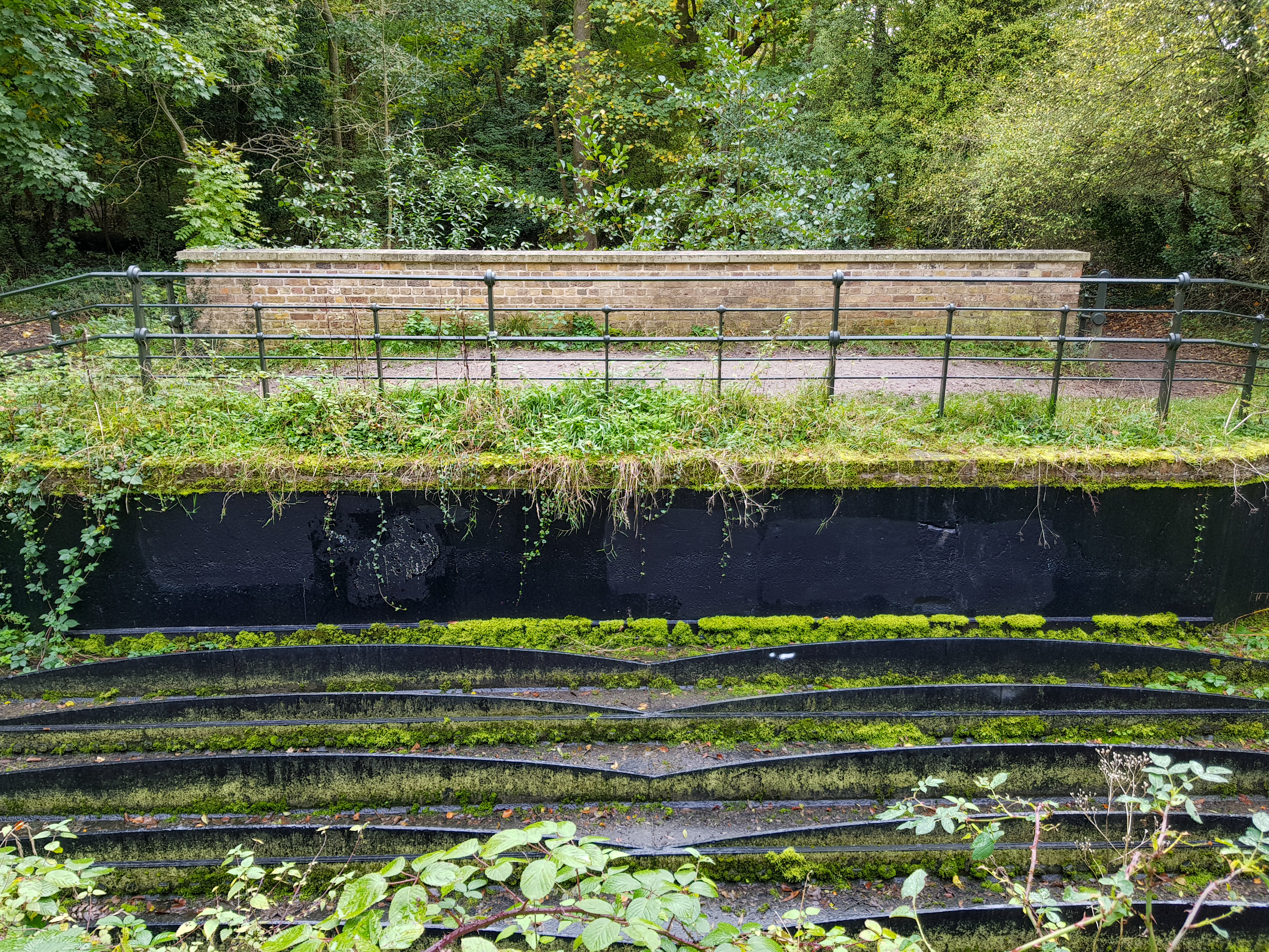
Flash Lane Aqueduct, Whitewebbs Wood

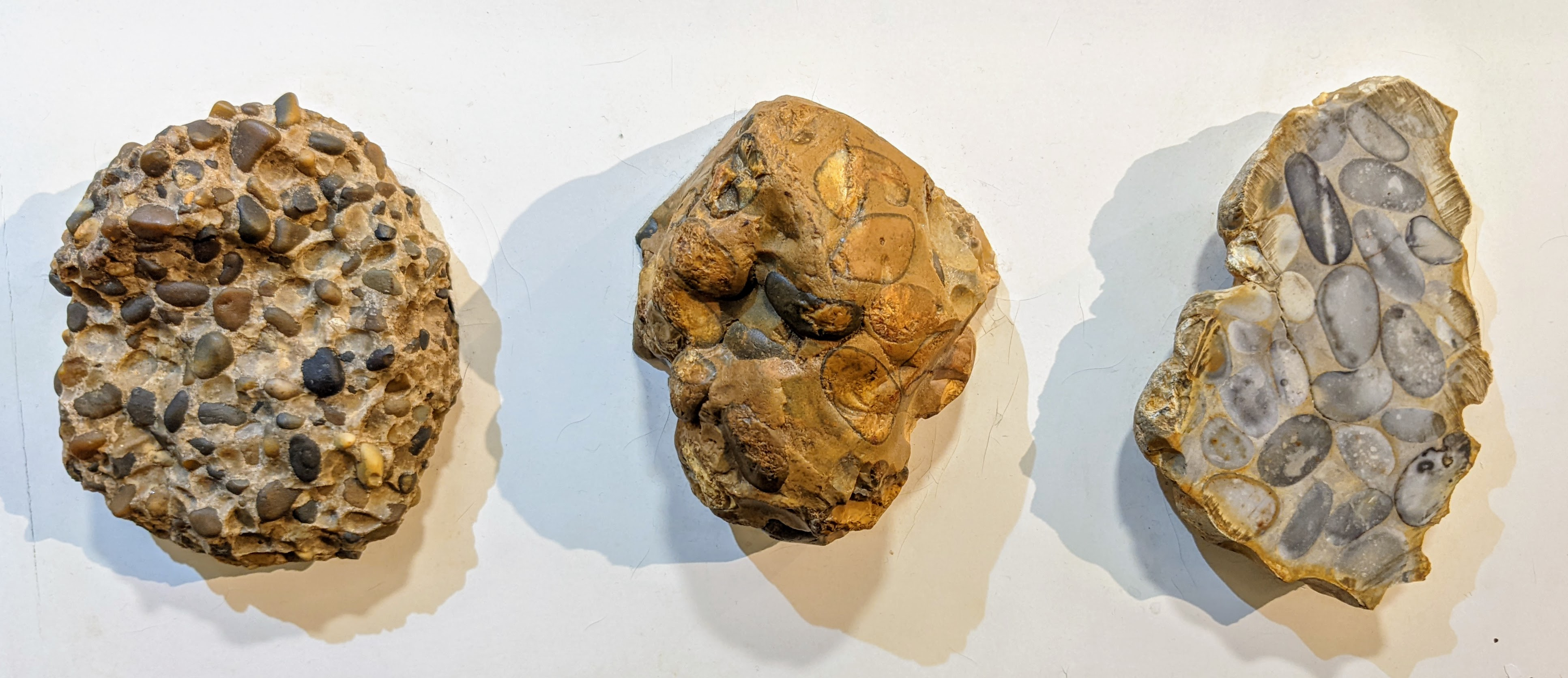
Samples of Hertfordshire puddingstone at Hertford Museum

Cuffley Brook is one of the longest tributaries of the River Lea, snaking for several miles through the south-east Hertfordshire hills. It rises in Northaw Great Wood, north west of Cuffley, and is joined there by Grimes Brook. Northaw Brook and Hempshill Brook join Cuffley Brook south of Cuffley, close to Soper's Viaduct (on the Hertford Loop railway line). The stream then goes under the M25 motorway, passes close to Crews Hill, and enters Whitewebbs Wood. There, it goes under the Flash Lane Aqueduct (on a former course of the New River), before reaching a confluence with Turkey Brook, in the London Borough of Enfield, at the north-west foot of Forty Hill.

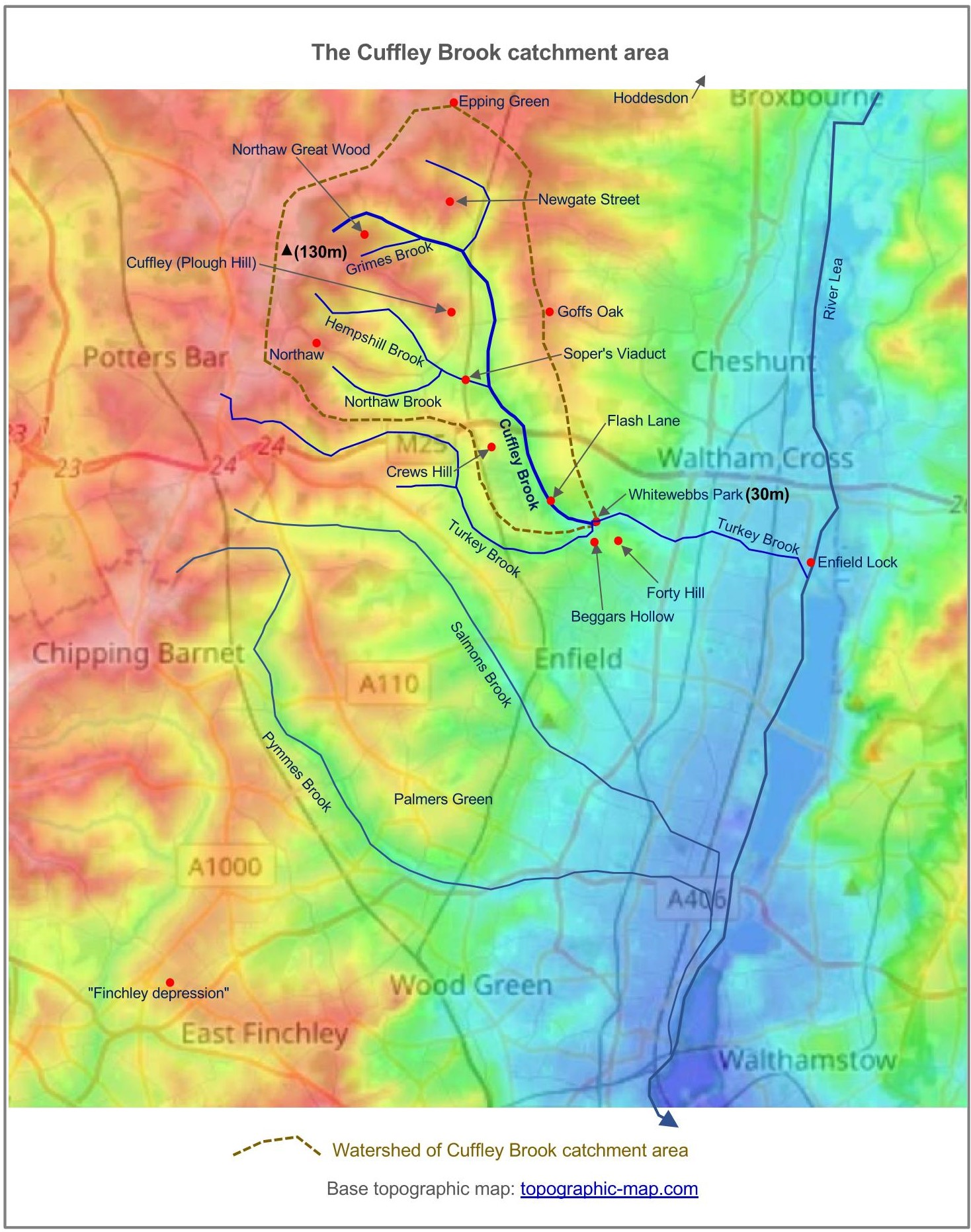
Topographic map of the Cuffley Brook catchment area, Hertfordshire and Enfield

== Geology ==
The oldest geological formation to outcrop within the Cuffley Brook catchment area is Cretaceous Chalk. This reaches the surface in the floor of the Hempshill Brook valley. The chalk also comes close to the surface in Northaw Great Wood, where swallow holes in overlying sediments near Cuffley Brook indicate that the chalk is not far below.

Overlying the chalk are fairly extensive areas of formations of the Lambeth Group, notably of the Reading Formation, which consists mostly of silty clay and sand. But samples of the distinctive "Hertfordshire Puddingstone" have also been found in Northaw Great Wood.

Overlying the above formations is Eocene London Clay, which is the main geological formation in the Cuffley Brook catchment area.

An early Pleistocene fluvial deposit known generally as "Pebble Gravel" covers an extensive area on higher parts of the catchment area - for example, around Northaw and Newgate Street.

A little lower than the Pebble Gravel, but still mostly on interfluves (for example, near Crews Hill), is another pre-glacial formation of fluvial origin known as "Dollis Hill Gravel".

Overlying some of the Pebble Gravel and Dollis Hill Gravel are notable deposits of glacial till, especially in the eastern and northern upper parts of the catchment area (for example around Goffs Oak and Epping Green).

Finally, throughout almost the whole length of Cuffley Brook and its tributaries, deposits of recent alluvium and valley sand and gravel are found along the valley floors.

== Origin and evolution ==
As a west bank tributary of the lower River Lea, Cuffley Brook came into being about 400,000 years ago, after the Anglian glaciation. During that glaciation, ice from the north of England advanced at least as far south as Watford, Finchley and Chingford.

Until the Anglian glaciation, the River Thames flowed north-eastwards to Hertford via Watford, through what is now the Vale of St Albans, then eastwards towards Chelmsford and the North Sea. As a result of the glaciation, the Thames was diverted to a more southerly route, broadly along the line of its current course.

Prior to the Anglian glaciation, a "proto-Mole-Wey" river was flowing northwards from the Weald and North Downs, through the "Finchley depression" and Palmers Green, to join the proto-Thames somewhere around Hoddesdon, at what is today an altitude of around 60 metres. It was this river which, during the course of the early and middle Pleistocene, deposited the "Dollis Hill Gravel" at successive altitudes.

When the Anglian ice sheet diverted the Thames southwards, the Mole-Wey was cut off at Richmond. Meltwater from the retreating Anglian ice sheet gave birth to a south-flowing lower River Lea, and that river cut into and followed in part the line of the former proto-Mole-Wey. It flowed into the newly diverted Thames, which at that time was spread over a wide flood plain extending as far north as Islington.

And, as the ice sheet retreated, west bank tributaries of the lower Lea, such as Cuffley Brook, flowed eastwards and south-eastwards from higher ground running roughly south-north through Potters Bar, down towards the newly formed lower River Lea. They, and their own tributaries, cut down successively through till left by the ice sheet, then through Pebble Gravel, "Dollis Hill Gravel", London Clay, and, in the case of Cuffley Brook, beds in the Lambeth Group beneath that.

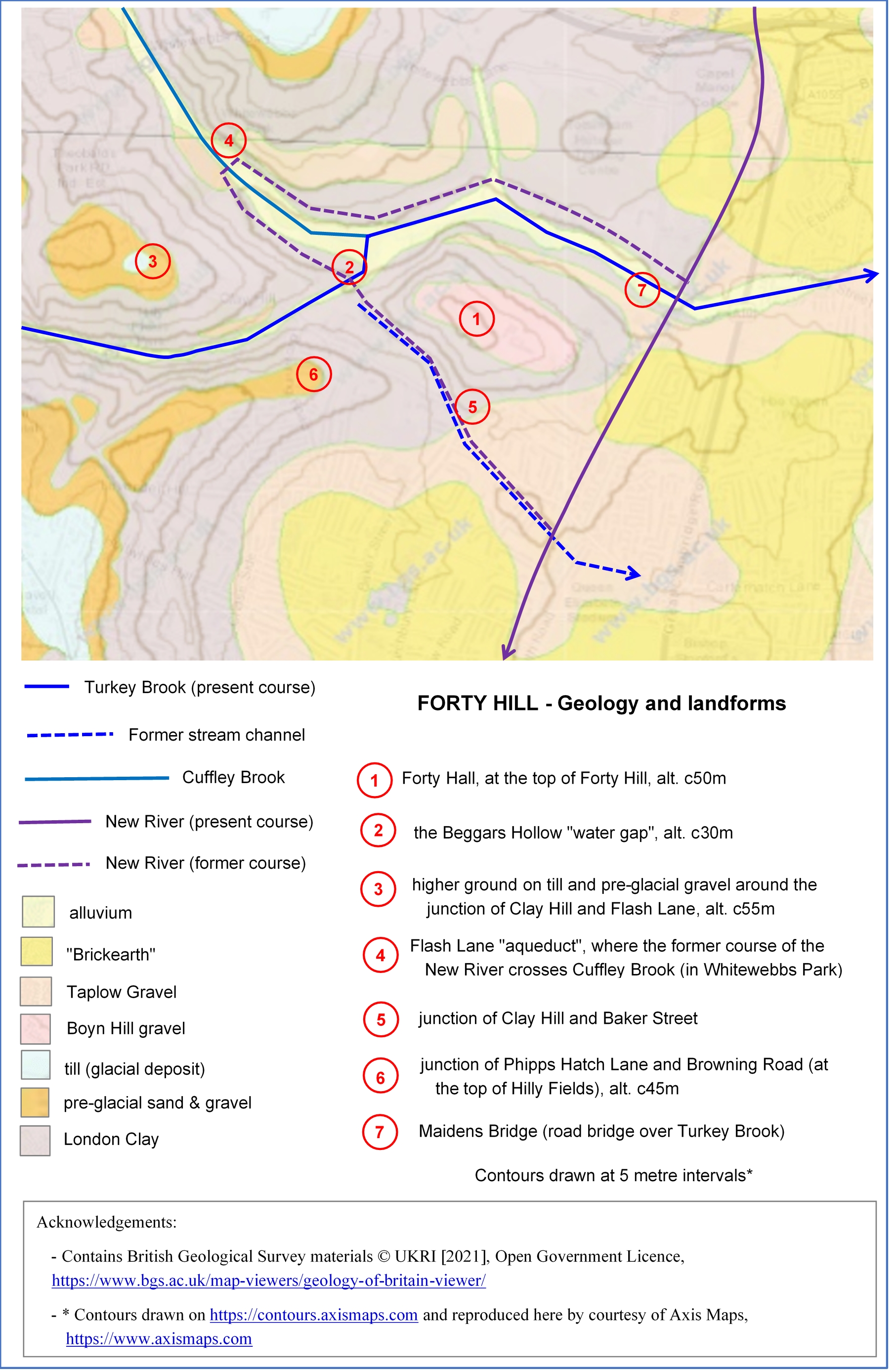
Geology and stream evolution near Forty Hill. Turkey Brook formerly flowed south-east from Beggars Hollow (2) to Baker Street (5) and beyond. As a result of stream capture in the recent geological past, it now flows northwards through Beggars Hollow to join Cuffley Brook north-west of Forty Hill (1).

It is not known at present whether Cuffley Brook, and other west bank tributaries of the Lea such as Pymmes Brook, Salmons Brook and Turkey Brook, followed valleys which had been in existence before the ice sheet covered the land, or whether they fashioned a substantially different landscape after the ice retreated. But it is known that today's tributaries of the upper Lea, such as the Rivers Mimram and Stort, follow broadly the same lines as pre-glaciation valleys, so, by analogy, it is quite possible that elements at least of the pre-glaciation topography of the lower Lea basin are reflected in today's relief.

In the case of Cuffley Brook immediately after the glaciation, that stream joined the River Lea somewhere around Forty Hill, where there is a deposit of "Boyn Hill Gravel". That gravel, which is on the highest of the river terraces left by the post-Anglian lower River Lea, marks the line followed by the Lea after the retreat of the ice sheet.

At Boyn Hill time (about 400,000 years ago), Cuffley Brook and Turkey Brook joined the River Lea at points not far away from each other, north and south of where Forty Hill is today, at what is now an altitude of c50 metres.

Then the River Lea moved steadily towards the east, leaving river terrace deposits of decreasing age and altitude as it did so. And, as a contour map shows, the two brooks each extended eastwards with the Lea, but stayed apart.

However, the brooks approached each other quite closely either side of Beggars Hollow (close to where, today, the Rose and Crown public house is located on Clay Hill). The dividing line between them was thus lowered by erosion at that point.

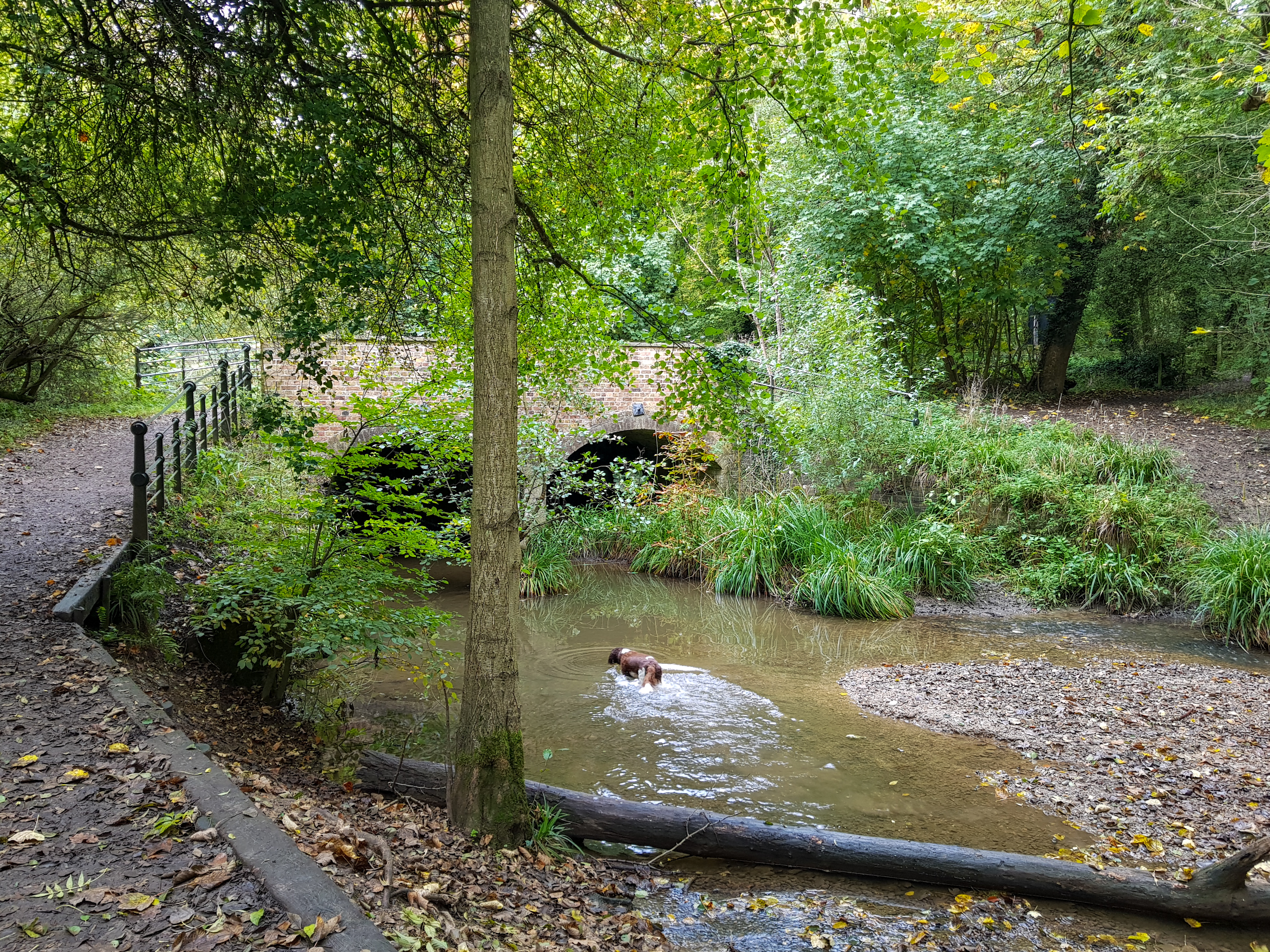
Cuffley Brook, Flash Lane crossing, Whitewebbs Wood

Eventually, in the recent geological past, the low point between Turkey Brook and Cuffley Brook at Beggars Hollow was breached. Turkey Brook thus changed its course, there to go north-east, through what is defined as a water gap. As a result, Turkey Brook joined Cuffley Brook in Whitewebbs Park and the merged stream continued eastwards along the former course of Cuffley Brook. But east of that junction, the stream is now known as Turkey Brook (and, locally, as Maidens Brook).

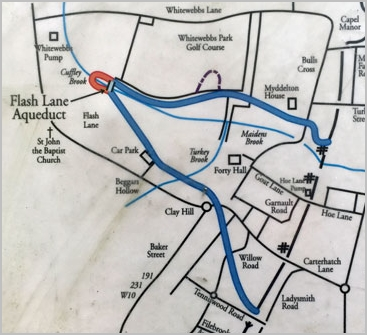
The route (in blue) of the former "Whitewebbs loop" of the New River (from an information board at the Flash Lane aqueduct).

When the New River was built, it followed the 30m contour from Hertfordshire south towards London, down the Lea valley. But, in Enfield, the engineers who constructed it took the New River on a loop going west, to the north of Forty Hill, and then across Cuffley Brook near Flash Lane (and, later, across an aqueduct there). From that point, they took it south-east, through the water gap at Beggars Hollow, along the former course of Turkey Brook, and down towards Enfield Town.

The New River was later straightened to flow southwards continuously, to the east of Forty Hill. An aqueduct was built for the New River to cross Turkey Brook near Maidens Bridge. This left the former course of the New River as it is today, curling through Whitewebbs Park, and passing through Beggars Hollow.

The upper parts of the Cuffley Brook valley (and the valleys of its headwaters) seem disproportionately deep for such small streams. For example, from the top of Plough Hill, Cuffley, the ground falls about 50 metres in altitude to the valley bottom in barely more than half a kilometre. But we are currently in an interglacial period, and the streams would have been flowing more strongly than today at times of "high discharge, under cold climatic conditions". And, at such times, soil cover and vegetation would have been much thinner than today, thus facilitating greater erosion. Furthermore, as the River Lea itself cut down as it moved eastwards, it lowered the base level of its tributary streams, like Cuffley and Turkey Brooks. That would have enabled the streams to become further incised into the higher ground to the west of the Lea flood plain.
