= Fir and Pond Woods =

Nature reserve near Potters Bar, Hertfordshire, England

Coordinates: 51.7161°N 0.30056°W

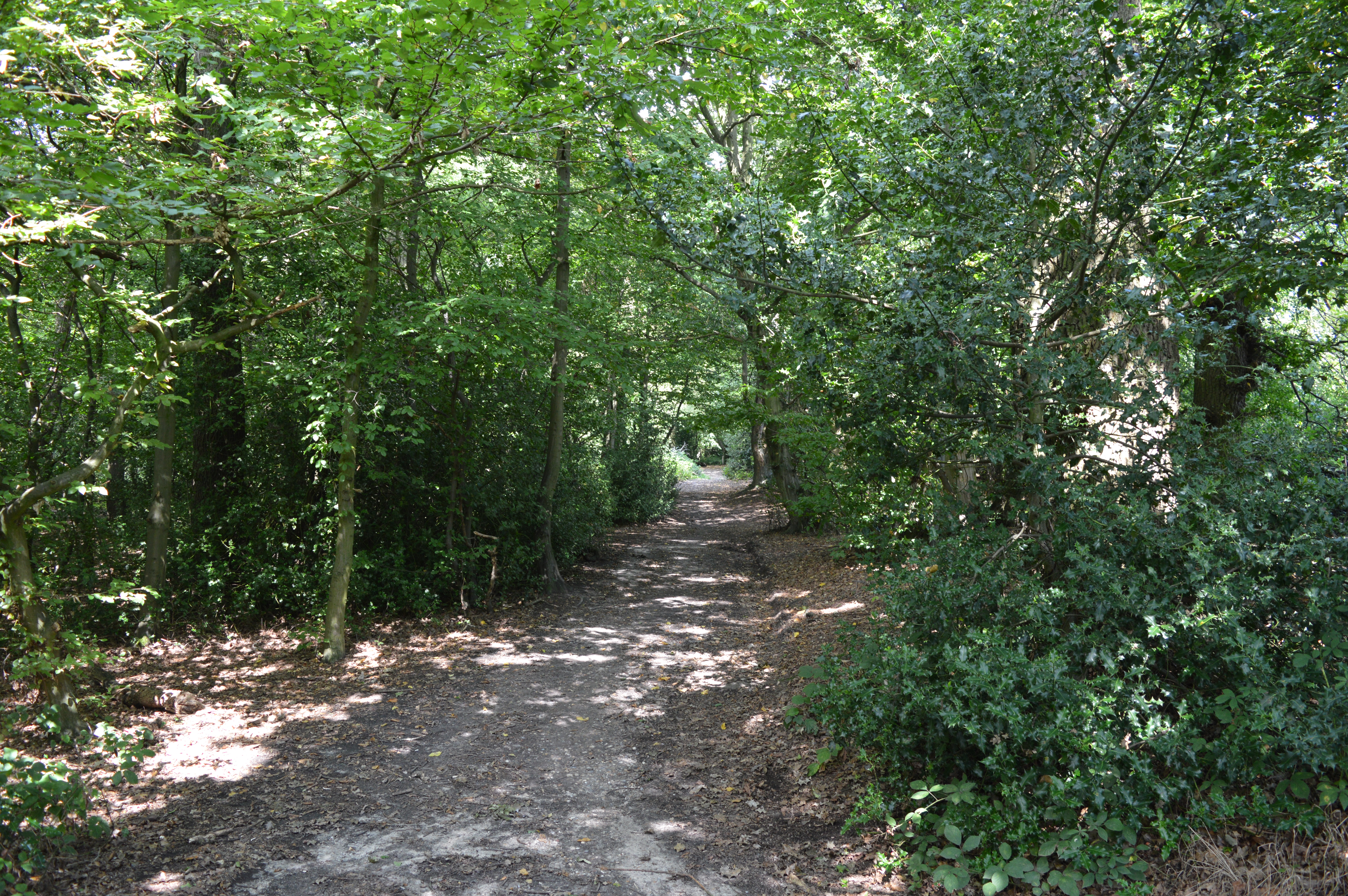
A path in Fir Wood

Fir and Pond Woods is a 29 hectare nature reserve in Potters Bar in Hertfordshire. It is managed by the Herts and Middlesex Wildlife Trust. It is two separate woods, with Fir Wood connected by a short footpath to the large Pond Wood to the south.

The site is a remnant of the ancient Enfield Chase, and it has woodland, meadows and wetlands, and diverse bird life. Turkey Brook passes a meadow at the southern end of Pond Wood.

There is access from Coopers Lane Road opposite Hook Lane.
