= Eley Industrial Estate =

Coordinates: 51.6141°N 0.0439°W

Eley Industrial Estate is in Edmonton, London. Bordered by the Angel Road which is part of the North Circular Road A406 road, the River Lee Navigation, and the Lea Valley Lines railway line. The estate is named after Eley Brothers who manufactured firearms cartridges here.

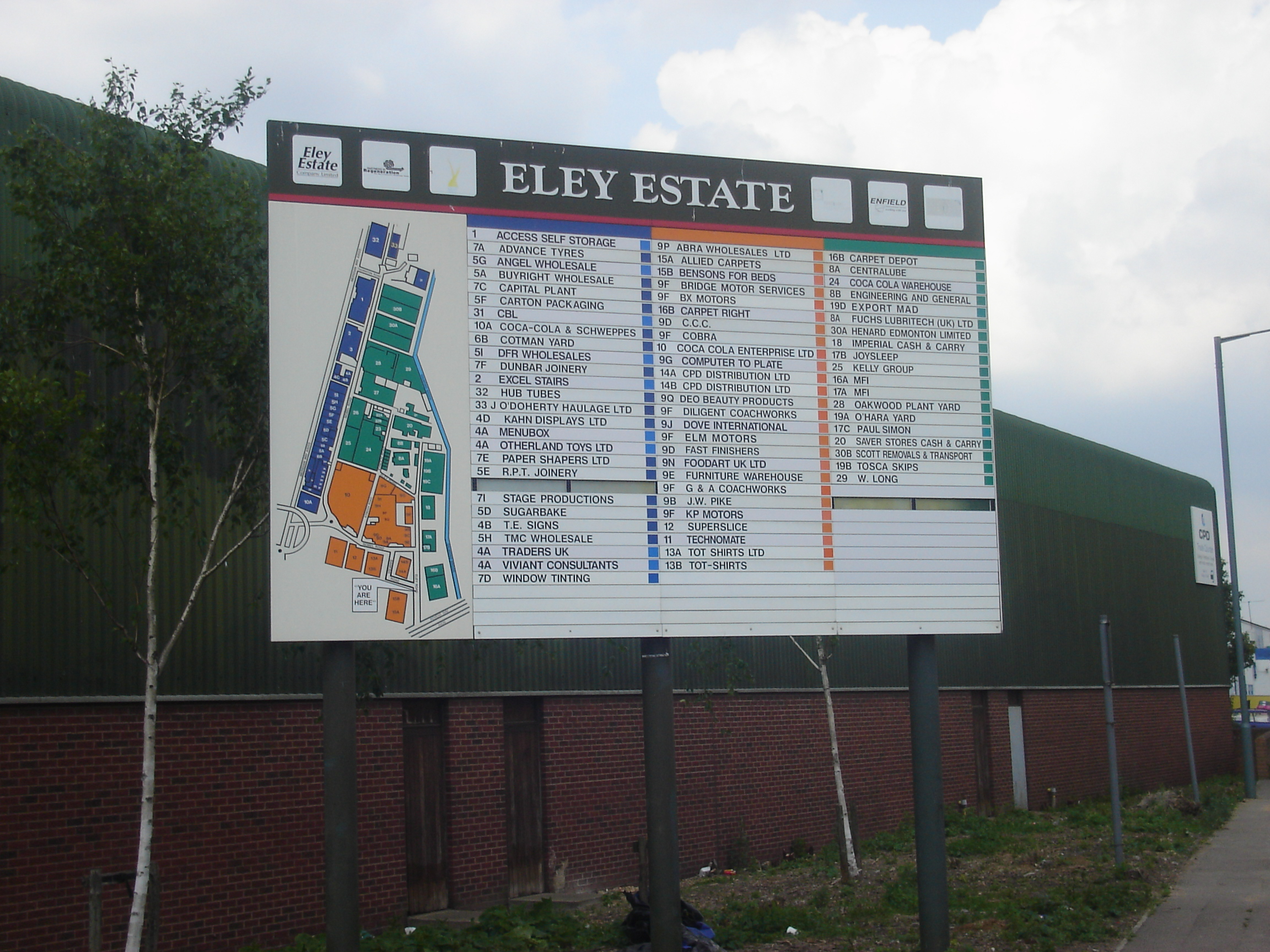
Layout of the estate

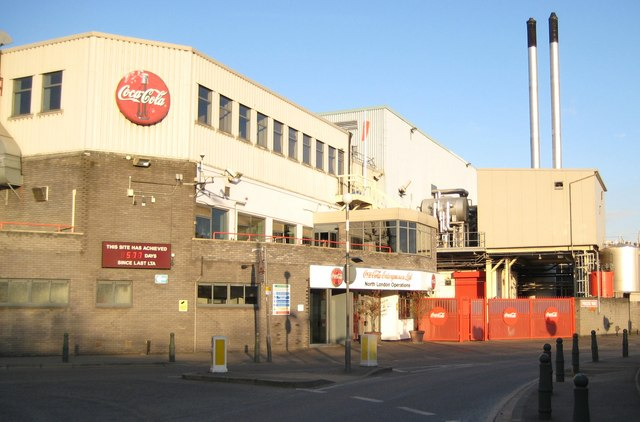
The Coca-Cola factory

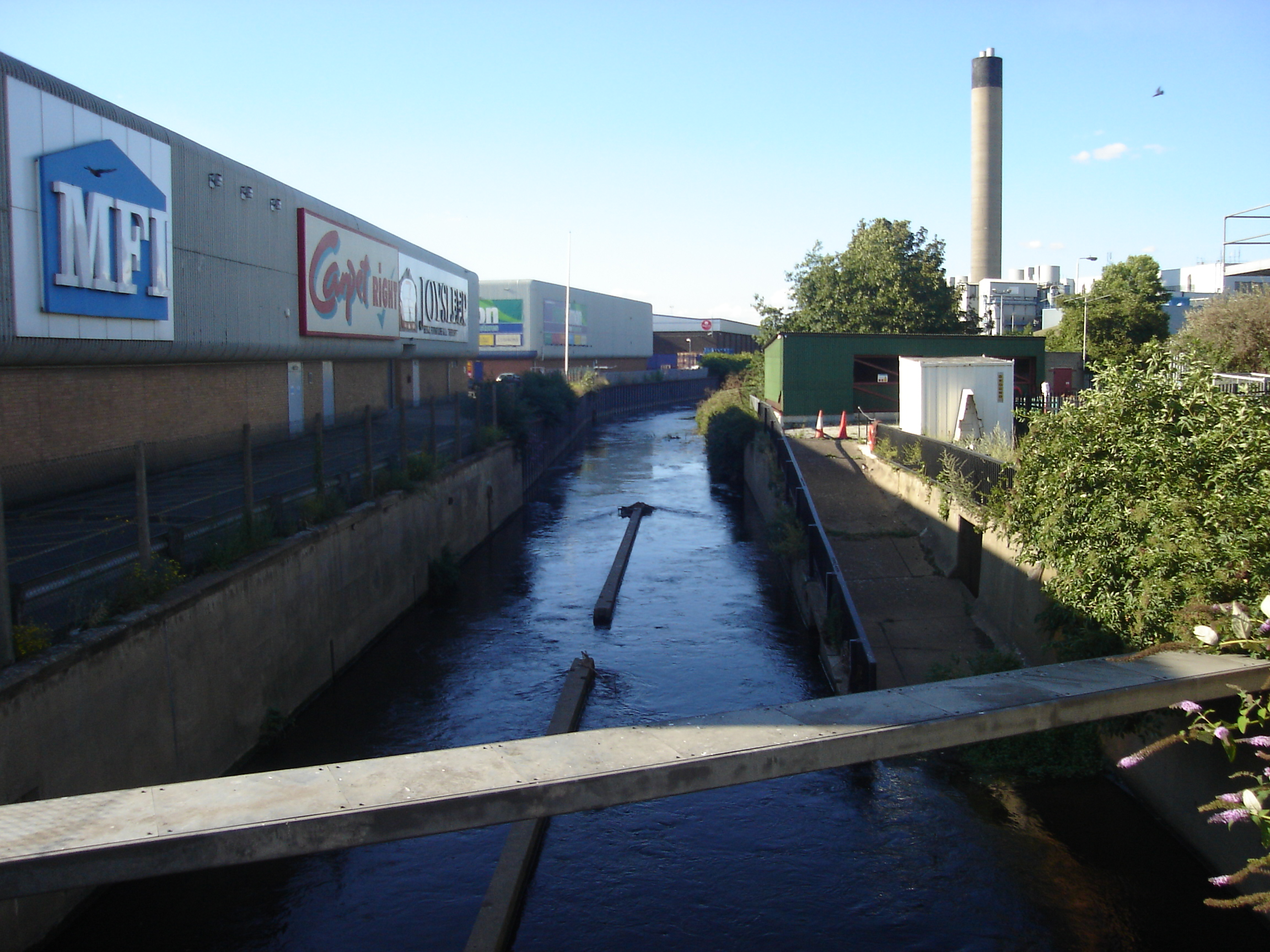
Salmons Brook flowing through the estate before passing under the North Circular Road at Angel Road. The Edmonton Incinerator chimney can be seen in the background

== Today ==
The estate is now mostly used for warehousing and retail outlets. The former B&I Nathan furniture factory is now used to manufacture the Parker Knoll range of furniture. Coca-Cola are a major employer with a manufacturing plant on the estate.

The estate still has some functional brick built factories from the 1950s.
