= Northaw Great Wood =

Woodland in Hertfordshire, England

Coordinates: 51.7228°N 0.1483°W

- Site of Special Scientific Interest
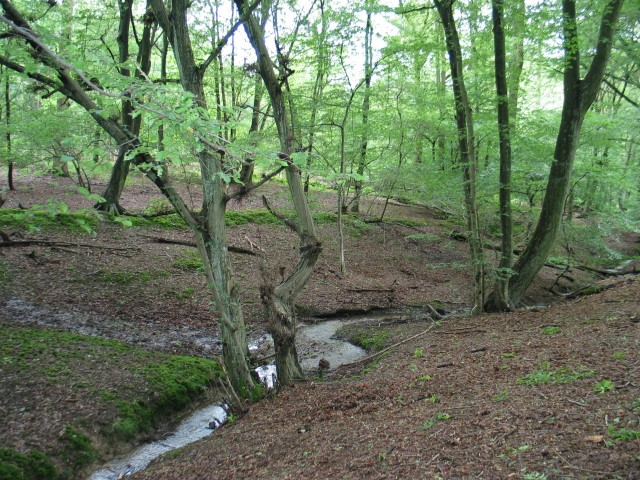
- Cuffley Brook with the moss covered remains of a parish boundary wall in the background
- Location of Northaw Great Wood.
- Area of search: Hertfordshire
- Grid reference: TL280043
- Interest: Biological
- Area: 223.6 ha (553 acres)
- Notification date: 1985
- Location map: Magic Map

Northaw Great Wood is a 223.6-hectare (553-acre) biological Site of Special Scientific Interest (SSSI) near Cuffley in Hertfordshire, England. It covers Northaw Great Wood Country Park, which is managed by Welwyn Hatfield Borough Council, Well Wood, Justice Hill and Grimes Bottom. Part of the site is managed by Hertfordshire County Council as a schools' park. The country park is also a local nature reserve.

The wood was part of a large area of common land in the parish of Northaw which was used for grazing livestock and source of wood fuel. Closure of the canopy has led to the disappearance of open woodland birds such as nightingales and tree pipits, but the management plan for the wood aims to restore biodiversity. The site has one of the county's most extensive areas of ancient hornbeam woodland, with other trees including oak and silver birch. Glades, streams and springs add to the biodiversity.

There is access from the Ridgeway in Cuffley and facilities include a car park and toilets.

== See also ==
- List of Sites of Special Scientific Interest in Hertfordshire
