= Salmons Brook =

River in London

Coordinates: 51.609°N 0.044°W

Salmons Brook is a minor tributary of the River Lea, located in the London Borough of Enfield.

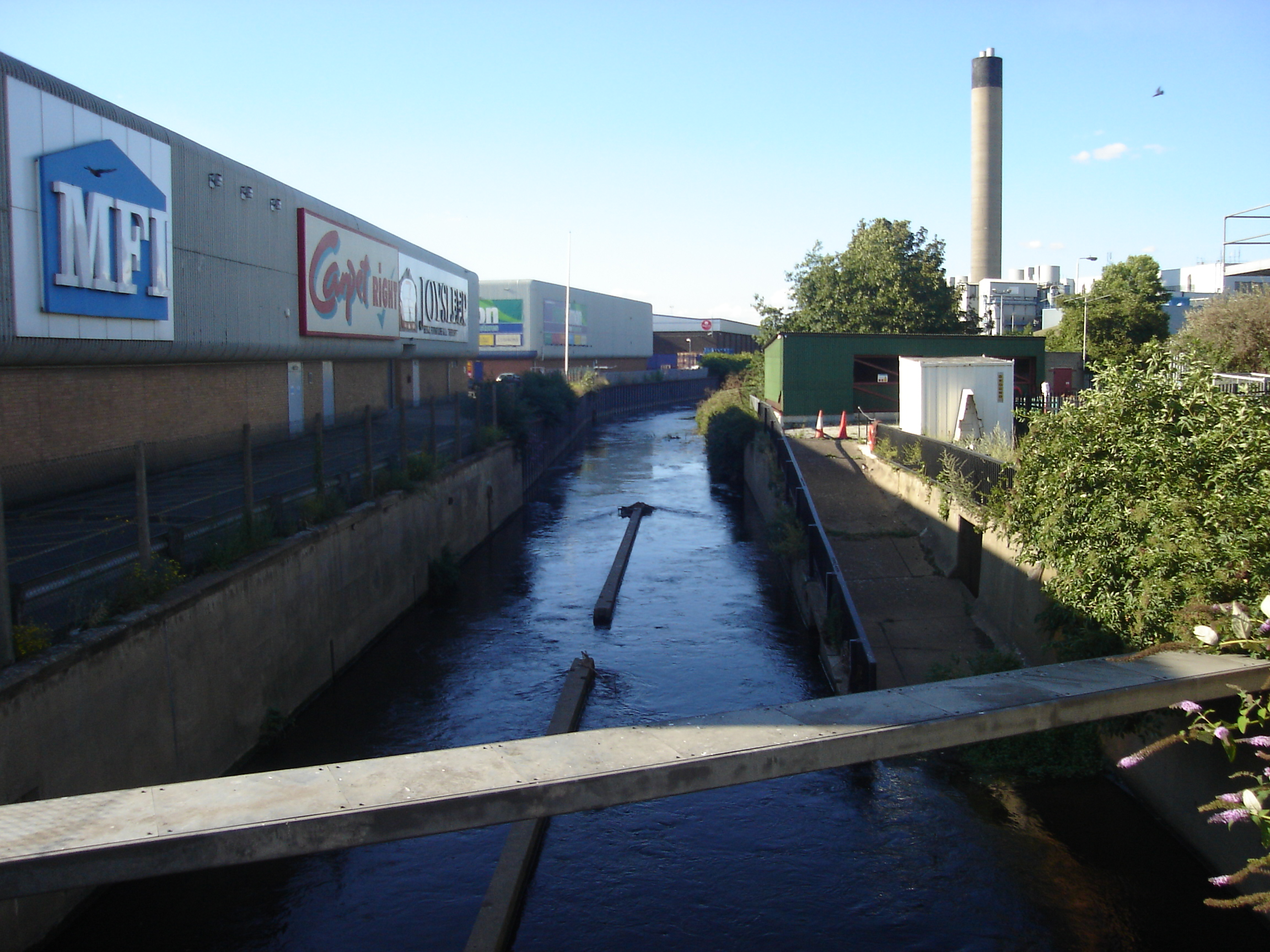
Salmons Brook at the Eley Industrial Estate before flowing under North Circular Road at Angel Road, Edmonton. The Edmonton Incinerator is in the background

== Etymology ==
Salmons Brook is marked thus on Rocque's map of 1754, probably named from the family of John Salemon of Edmonton mentioned in 1274.

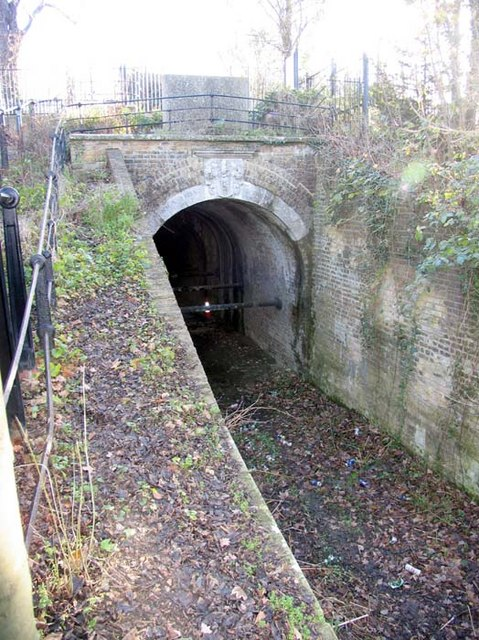
Clarendon Arch is a barrel vaulted tunnel which carries Salmons Brook below the New River at Bush Hill. Originally the brook was spanned by a bridge constructed between 1608 and 1613. In 1682 the bridge was replaced by an arch named after the then Governor of the New River Company, the Earl of Clarendon. This was commemorated by a carved ornamental keystone with an inscription. The arch was again rebuilt in 1725 and is now a statutory listed Grade II structure.

== Course ==
The brook rises south of Potters Bar, in Enfield Chase on the borders of the former Enfield Old Park, and flows east close to Trent Park and to Bush Hill where it passes under the New River to enter Edmonton. The brook is culverted under Edmonton Green to emerge at Plevna Road, where it runs alongside the Pymmes Brook Trail. It skirts the walled Edmonton Federation Jewish Cemetery and the Tottenham Park Cemetery before flowing under Montagu Road to be joined by the culverted Saddlers Mill Stream in an area prone to serious flooding. Running through wasteland and under the Lea Valley Lines railway, it is quickly joined by the outflow of the Deephams Sewage Treatment Works. Flowing through the Eley Industrial Estate and close to the Edmonton Incinerator, the brook can be seen as it passes under the North Circular Road at Angel Road before merging with Pymmes Brook.

== Geology, origin and evolution ==
The main geological formation underlying the Salmons Brook catchment area is Eocene London Clay. The uppermost part of this formation - the "Claygate Beds" - has a higher sand content. In some parts of the higher sections of the catchment area, the London Clay is overlain by "Stanmore Gravel" and "Dollis Hill Gravel" (both Quaternary pre-glacial fluvial deposits), and by Quaternary glacial till. From Slades Hill southwards, there are alluvium deposits on the Salmons Brook valley floor. And east of Bush Hill, the brook crosses extensive Quaternary river terrace deposits laid down by the River Lea.

As a west bank tributary of the lower River Lea, Salmons Brook came into being about 400,000 years ago, after the Anglian glaciation. During that glaciation, ice from the north of England advanced at least as far south as Watford, Finchley and Chingford.

Until the Anglian glaciation, the River Thames flowed north-eastwards via Watford, through what is now the Vale of St Albans, then eastwards towards Chelmsford and the North Sea. As a result of the glaciation, the Thames was diverted to a more southerly route, broadly along the line of its current course.

Prior to the Anglian glaciation, a "proto-Mole-Wey" river was flowing northwards from the Weald and North Downs, through the "Finchley depression" and Palmers Green, to join the proto-Thames somewhere around Hoddesdon, at what is today an altitude of around 60 metres. It was this river which, during the course of the early and middle Pleistocene, deposited the "Dollis Hill Gravel" at successive altitudes.

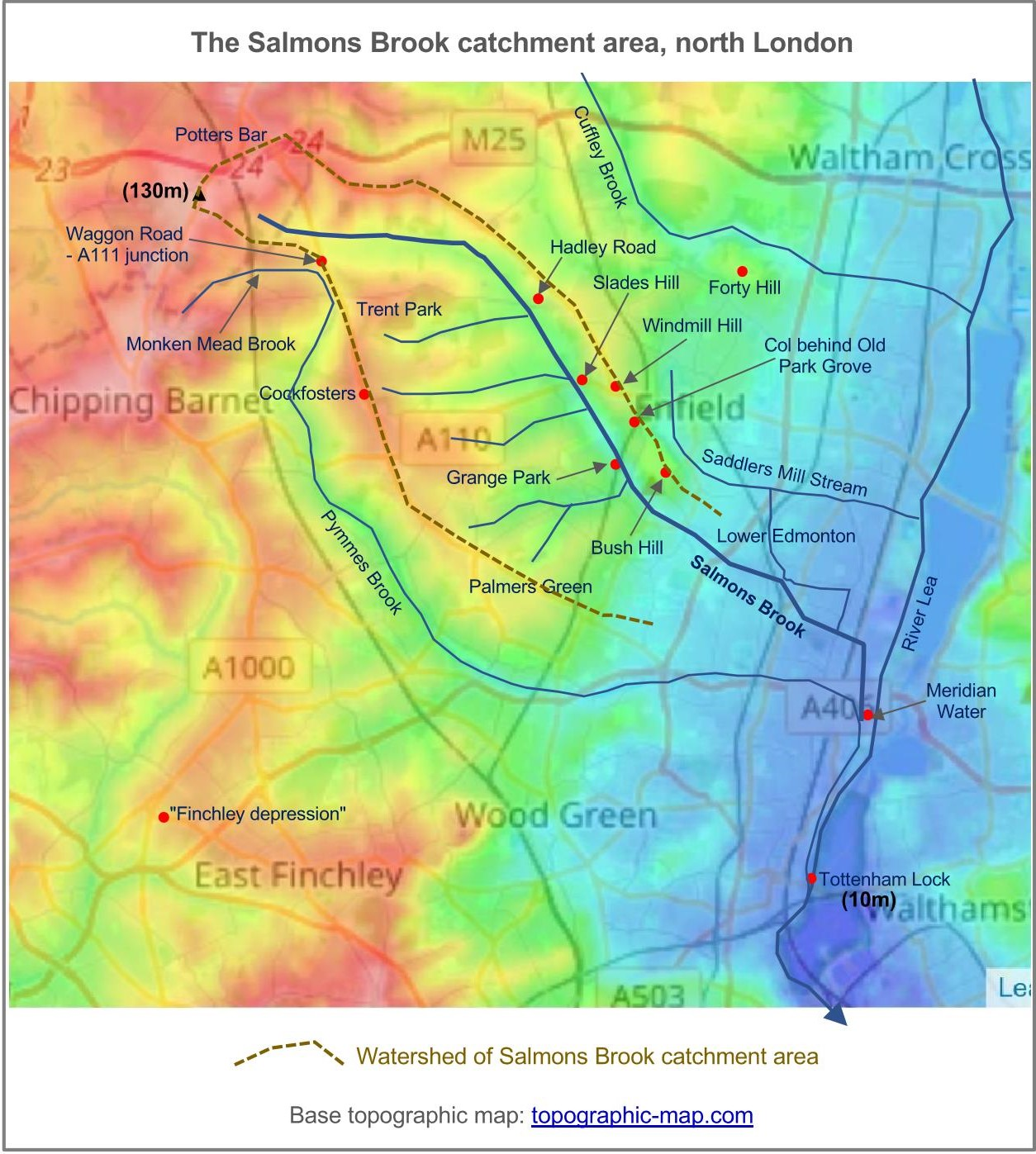
Topographic map of the Pymmes Brook catchment area, north London

When the Anglian ice sheet diverted the Thames southwards, the Mole-Wey was cut off at Richmond. Meltwater from the retreating Anglian ice sheet gave birth to a south-flowing lower River Lea, and that river cut into and followed in part the line of the former proto-Mole-Wey. It flowed into the newly diverted Thames, which at that time was spread over a wide flood plain extending as far north as Islington.

And, as the ice sheet retreated, west bank tributaries of the lower Lea, such as Salmons Brook, flowed eastwards and south-eastwards from higher ground running roughly south–north through Potters Bar, down towards the newly formed lower River Lea. They, and their own tributaries, cut down successively through till left by the ice sheet, then through "Dollis Hill Gravel", and then into Claygate Beds and London Clay below.

It is not known at present whether Salmons Brook, and other west bank tributaries such as Pymmes Brook and Cuffley Brook, followed valleys which had been in existence before the ice sheet covered the land, or whether they fashioned a substantially different landscape after the ice retreated. But it is known that today's tributaries of the upper Lea, such as the Rivers Mimram and Stort, follow broadly the same lines as pre-glaciation valleys, so, by analogy, it is quite possible that elements at least of the pre-glaciation topography of the lower Lea basin are reflected in today's relief.

In the case of Salmons Brook immediately after the glaciation, that stream joined the River Lea somewhere around Bush Hill, where there is a deposit of "Boyn Hill Gravel". That gravel, which is on the highest of the river terraces left by the post-Anglian lower River Lea, marks the line followed by the Lea after the retreat of the ice sheet.

(Bush Hill itself is today an example of inverted relief, albeit on a small scale. Inversion of relief occurs "when materials on valley floors are, or become, more resistant to erosion than the adjacent valley slopes. As erosion proceeds, the valley floor becomes a ridge bounded by newly formed valleys on each side". In the case of Bush Hill, the permeable Boyn Hill Gravel on the hill protected the otherwise easily eroded London Clay underneath from being removed, while nearby watercourses cut down into exposed London Clay).

During the course of the following 400,000 years, the lower Lea moved steadily eastwards, leaving river terrace deposits of decreasing age and altitude as it did so, as well as a relatively steep eastern slope. (This eastward shift has been attributed to an underlying monocline.) Salmons Brook thus extended its course south-eastwards from Bush Hill, across the valley floor of the lower Lea, through Lower Edmonton, to Meridian Water. There, it merges today with Pymmes Brook, which in turns flows southwards before joining the River Lea near Tottenham Lock.

From Hadley Road down to Grange Park, Salmons Brook, like the lower River Lea, has a notably steep eastern slope. Associated with that is the fact that all the tributaries of that section of Salmons Brook are on its west side. So it is possible that that section of the brook has, like the lower River Lea, also shifted eastwards somewhat since the Anglian glaciation (and, if so, presumably for the same reason).

In addition, that section of the Salmons Brook valley today seems disproportionately deep for such a small stream - for example, at Slades Hill. But we are currently in an interglacial period, and the stream would have been flowing more strongly than today at times of "high discharge, under cold climatic conditions". And, at such times, soil cover and vegetation would have been much thinner than today, thus facilitating greater erosion. Furthermore, as the River Lea itself cut down as it moved eastwards, it lowered the base level of its tributary stream, Salmons Brook. That would have enabled the brook to become further incised into the higher ground to the west of the Lea flood plain.

The drainage pattern in this area continues to evolve. For example, the pronounced wind gap at the junction of Waggon Road and the A111, where the east-flowing Monken Mead Brook turns sharply to the south to become the upper part of Pymmes Brook, indicates that Monken Mead Brook once continued eastwards as a tributary of Salmons Brook. It has been captured by Pymmes Brook in the recent geological past.

== Flooding ==
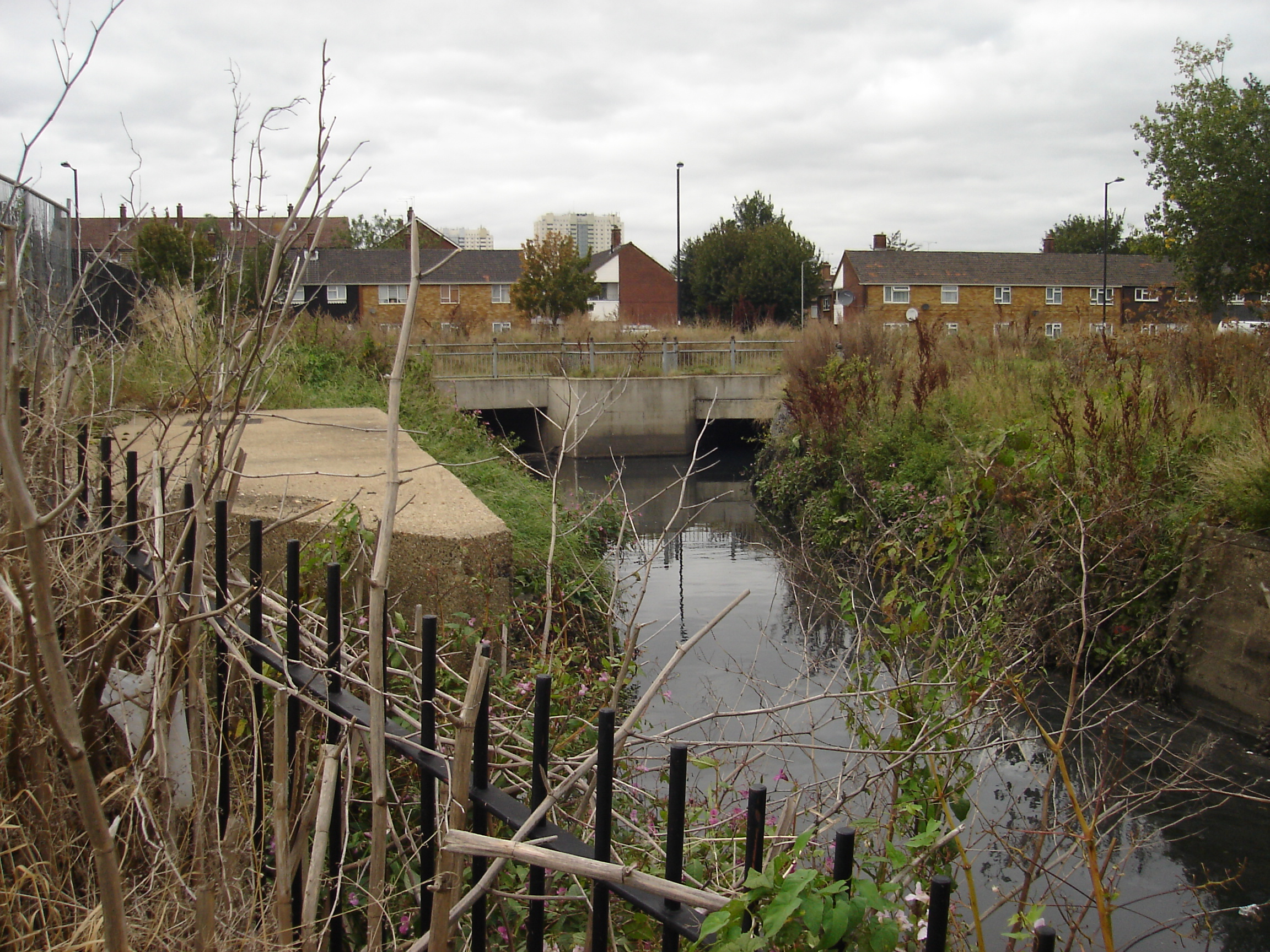
Saddlers Millstream (right) merges with Salmons Brook below Montagu Road, Edmonton

The brook has a history of flooding. The last major incident was in October, 2000 in the Montagu Road area of Edmonton.
