= Lea Valley =

River valley in London, England

Coordinates: 51.69°N 0.01°W

Designations

Ramsar Wetland
- Official name: Lee Valley
- Designated: 9 October 2000
- Reference no.: 1037

The Lea Valley (also spelt Lee Valley), the valley of the River Lea, has been used as a transport corridor, a source of sand and gravel, an industrial area, a water supply for London, and a recreational area. The London 2012 Summer Olympics were based in Stratford, in the Lower Lea Valley. It is important for London's water supply, as the source of the water transported by the New River aqueduct, but also as the location for the Lee Valley Reservoir Chain, stretching from Enfield through Tottenham and Walthamstow.

== Geography ==
=== Physical geography ===
The catchment area of the River Lea is located in the central part of the London Basin, on that basin's northern flank.

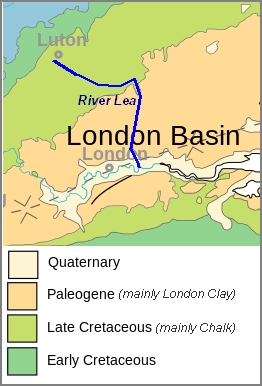
A simplified geological map of that part of the London Basin through which flows the River Lea.

The main underlying geological formation of the upper part of the Lea catchment, north of Hoddesdon, is Cretaceous Chalk. The main underlying geological formation of the lower part of the Lea catchment, south of Hoddesdon, is Eocene London Clay.

However, large areas of these formations are overlain by much more recent Quaternary formations, including Clay-with-Flints (on the Chalk), till and other glacial deposits (mostly in the upper part of the catchment), and fluvial sand, gravel and alluvium (in the lower parts of today's valleys, but also on some higher ground in east Hertfordshire, Middlesex and west Essex, where such deposits were laid down by the pre-glacial "proto-Thames" and its former tributaries).

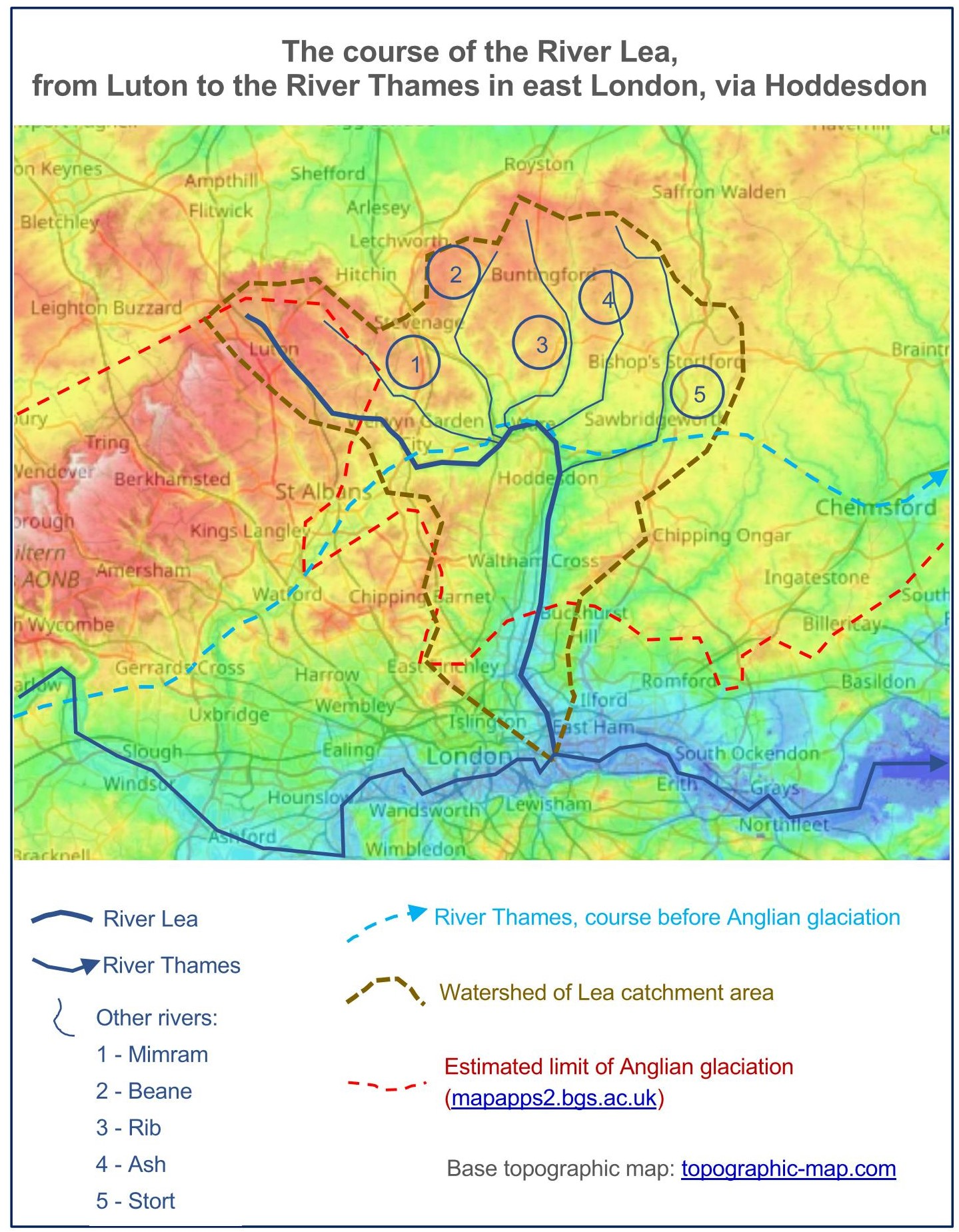
A topographic map of the Lea Valley, England (topographic-map.com), with Anglian glaciation details.

The northern boundary of the Lea catchment area rises to an altitude of almost 180 metres (590 ft), in hills north-east of Luton. The lowest point of the catchment area is the junction of the Lea with the Thames in east London, at an altitude of barely 5 metres (16 ft).

The relief of the upper part of the Lea catchment is one of gently rolling hills, which are divided by the valleys that fan out to the north and north-west from an area between Hertford and Hoddesdon.

The lower part of the Lea catchment runs from Hoddesdon southwards to east London, with the flood plain of the River Lea as its central feature. That flood plain has a width which extends to about 4.3 miles (7 km) in Edmonton. From there, the land rises on either side to an altitude of around 120 metres (390 ft), to gravel-capped plateaus in Hertfordshire (Northaw) and Middlesex (Southgate) to the west, and to Essex (Epping Forest) in the east.

The upper part of the catchment area of the River Lea was formerly a group of valleys whose rivers flowed approximately north–south directly into the River Thames (the "proto-Thames"). Until the Anglian glaciation about 450,000 years ago, the Thames flowed north-eastward past Watford, through what is now the Vale of St Albans, then eastwards towards Chelmsford and the North Sea.

The lower part of today's Lea valley was formed during the Anglian glaciation. During that period, ice from the north of England advanced at least as far south as Watford, Finchley and Chingford. As a result, the River Thames was diverted to a more southerly route, broadly along the line of its current course.

As the ice retreated, the lower part of the River Lea was formed. It flowed almost directly north–south into the newly diverted Thames (see further notes below).

Further north, the newly formed lower Lea was fed by rivers which, as mentioned above, had flowed directly into the proto-Thames prior to the Anglian glaciation. These rivers - the upper Lea, the Mimram, the Beane, the Rib, the Ash and the Stort - today follow courses which are mostly similar to those of their pre-Anglian predecessors.

(Note - the above summary is accurate as far as it goes, but in reality the processes of glaciation and river diversion were more complex than in this summary - for example, four separate ice advances of the Anglian glaciation in this area have been identified.)

==== Further notes on the lower Lea Valley ====
Prior to the Anglian glaciation, a "proto-Mole-Wey" river was flowing northwards from the Weald and North Downs, through the "Finchley depression", to join the proto-Thames somewhere around Hoddesdon.

Just prior to the arrival of the Anglian ice sheet in the Thames basin, this proto-Mole-Wey river appears to have been flowing over a wide, low-gradient valley floor between Palmers Green and Hoddesdon at what is today an altitude of around 60 metres (200 ft).

When the Anglian ice sheet diverted the Thames southwards, the Mole-Wey was cut off at Richmond. As meltwater from the retreating Anglian ice sheet gave birth to the south-flowing lower River Lea, that river cut into and followed the line of the former proto-Mole-Wey, between Hoddesdon and Palmers Green. It flowed into the newly diverted Thames, which at that time was spread over a wide flood plain extending as far north as Islington.

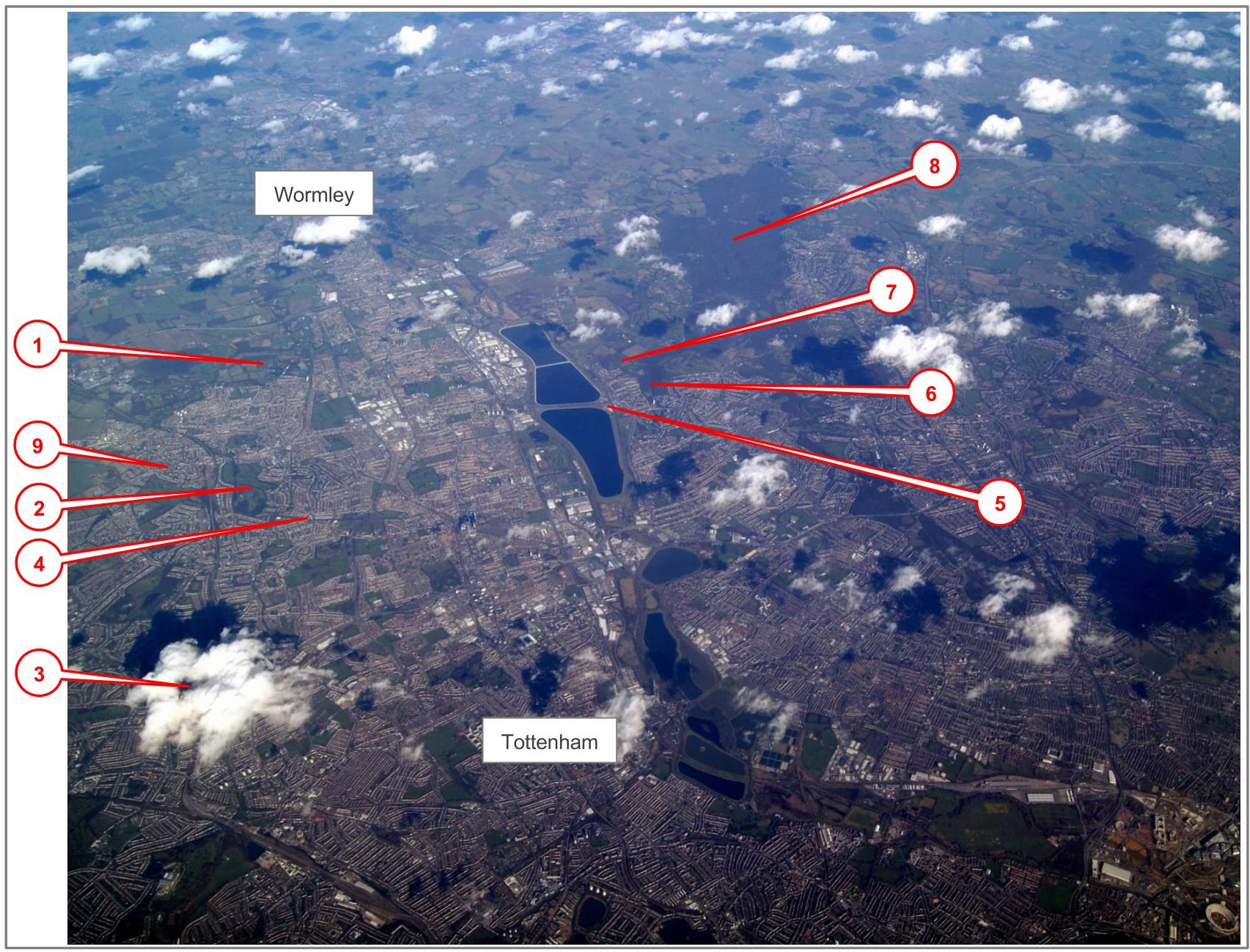
Lower Lea valley from the air, showing locations mentioned in text: 1 - Forty Hill, 2 - Bush Hill, 3 - Broomfield Park, 4 - Ridge Avenue library, 5 - Foot of Kings Head Hill, 6 - Pole Hill, 7 - Yardley Hill, 8 - Epping Forest, 9 - Windmill Hill

And, as the ice sheet retreated, west bank tributaries of the lower Lea, such as Pymmes Brook, Salmons Brook and Cuffley Brook, flowed eastwards and south-eastwards from higher ground running roughly south–north through Potters Bar, down towards the newly formed lower River Lea. They (and their own tributaries such as Bounds Green Brook) cut down successively through till left by the ice sheet, then through "Dollis Hill Gravel", and then into Eocene London Clay below.

The earliest line of the lower River Lea is indicated by what appear on the BGS 1:50,000 map as deposits of "Boyn Hill gravel", notably at Forty Hill, Bush Hill and Palmers Green (Broomfield Park). These deposits lie at an altitude of approximately 50 metres (160 ft), just to the east of, and slightly lower than, the lowest gravel deposits left by the proto-Mole-Wey (shown on BGS maps as "Dollis Hill Gravel").

But the River Lea has clearly moved eastwards since the Boyn Hill terraces were laid down. In fact, the lower Lea Valley has been noted for the striking width of its valley floor, especially the section from Wormley down to Tottenham, as well as for the relative steepness of parts of its eastern slope.

For example, in the London Borough of Enfield, the ground slopes from an altitude of only about 25 metres (82 ft) at the Ridge Avenue library to about 15 metres (49 ft) at the foot of Kings Head Hill, some 3.1 miles (5 km) to the east. It then rises to an altitude of 85 metres (279 ft) on the summit of Pole Hill, barely a further one kilometre to the east. Across that 3.1 miles (5 km) of valley floor, the ground is mostly covered by river terrace deposits of decreasing altitude and age, thus demonstrating that the lower River Lea has migrated eastwards since it was formed some 400,000 years ago.

Some authors have proposed that the notable width of the lower Lea Valley indicates that it was once occupied by a larger and more powerful river, namely the proto-Thames.

However, this hypothesis is not universally supported. In any case, even if all or some of the water being conveyed by the proto-Thames as it flowed north-east through the Vale of St Albans was diverted southwards from around Hoddesdon by an advancing Anglian ice sheet, this could only have been for a brief (geologically speaking) period, because the ice then progressed further to the south and caused the above-mentioned complete diversion of the Thames to its more southerly course of today.

In addition, it is clear that the River Lea alone has been powerful enough to cause significant erosion below the surface across which the Anglian ice sheet flowed and on which it left till and other deposits. A cross-section across the Lea Valley at Enfield shows that the Lea has cut down by as much as 45 metres (49 yd), over a width of more than 3.7 miles (6 km), since the Anglian glaciation.

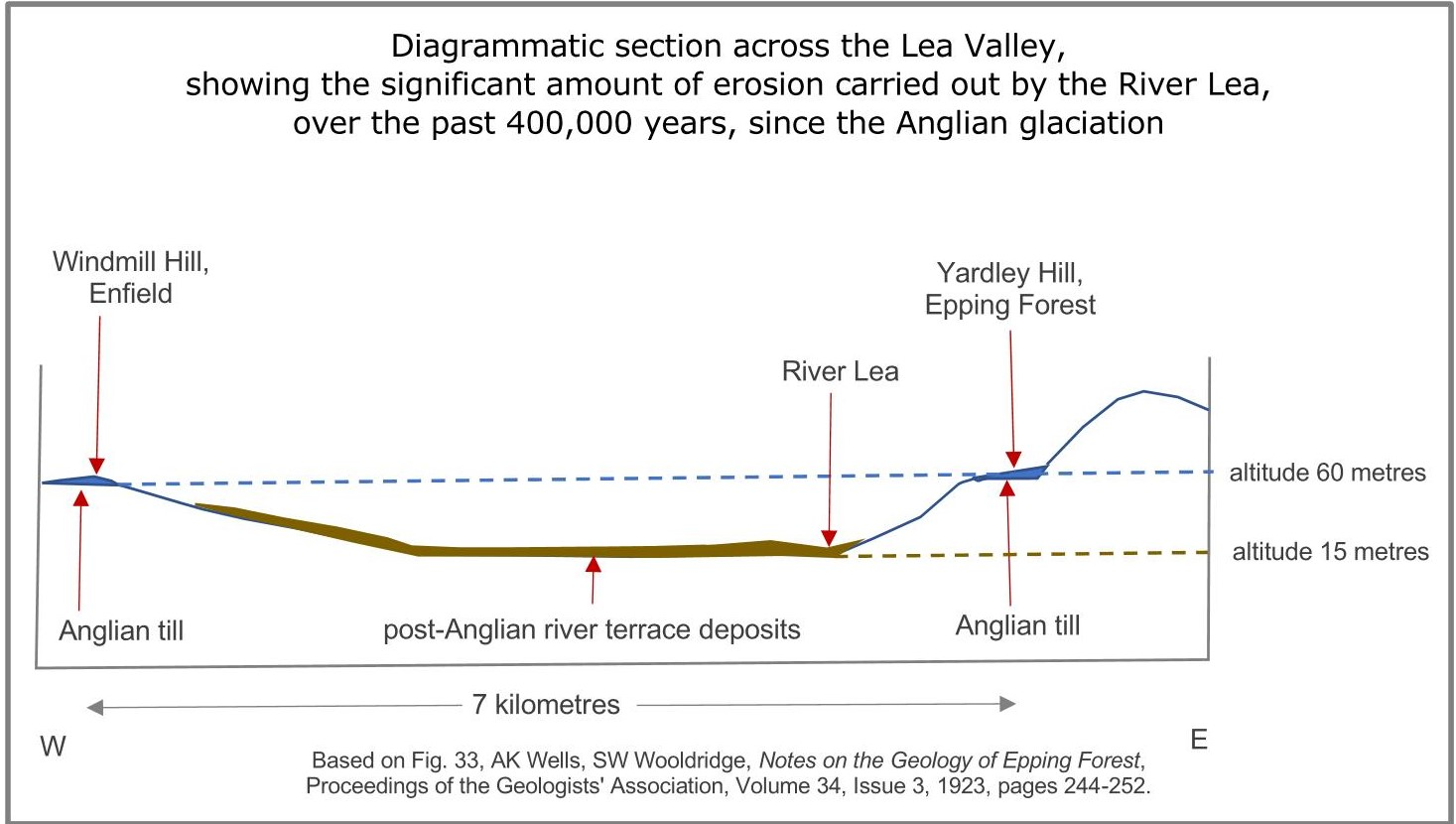
Diagrammatic section across the lower Lea Valley

But why did the River Lea move eastwards? It has been suggested that the River Lea has been "tilted...into its eastern bank" by "a north-south monocline" which was established "at least as early as the beginning of Eocene times". Pleistocene isostatic adjustment of the London Basin (with uplift in the west caused by erosion and subsidence in the east caused by accumulation of deposits in the North Sea) may also have played a role.

=== Human geography ===
The northern section of the valley, although including several towns (Luton, Harpenden, Hertford and Ware), is mainly rural. Below Hertford the Lea flows on a wide floodplain, which becomes an increasingly urban transport corridor as it enters Greater London. Many of the upper sections have been exploited for sand, gravel or brickearth, and are now part of the Lee Valley Park.

From Hoddesdon a more or less continuous ribbon development runs south to the west of the river, running through Wormley, Broxbourne, Cheshunt and Waltham Cross to Freezy Water. To the south the wider expanse of Greater London includes the floodplain settlements of Enfield Lock, Enfield Highway, Brimsdown, Ponders End, Edmonton, Tottenham, Tottenham Hale, Clapton, Lea Bridge, Leyton, Hackney Wick, Old Ford, Bow, Stratford, West Ham, Bromley-by-Bow, Canning Town and Leamouth.

A combination of factors led to the development of the valley as an important industrial area. These included, in the early days, distance from London for noxious industries and the availability of water power. Later factors included cheap electrical power from Brimsdown and large expanses of flat land.

== History ==
=== Boundary ===
In earlier centuries the river Lea and its marshland formed a natural boundary between the historic areas of Middlesex and Essex, some 1.2 miles (2 km) wide and 12 miles (20 km) long. The river was crossed at several points by fords or ferries, which were eventually replaced by bridges. At Stratford a stone causeway on the Roman road to Colchester was supplemented by bridge in 1100. In 1745 the valley was crossed at Clapton by Lea Bridge. In 1810 an iron bridge was built linking East India Dock Road. In the late 1920s the Lea Valley Viaduct, carrying the North Circular Road, was built to a design by Owen Williams. This was replaced in the 1980s.

=== Byway ===
The valley of the Lea formed a route followed by the New River and Lee Navigation, and roads including the Roman Ermine Street, the Hertford Road (A1010) and the later Great Cambridge Road (A10) and A1055. The valley is also followed by two routes of what became the Great Eastern Railway and had important marshalling yards and locomotive works at Temple Mills.

=== Industry ===
Much early industrialisation was a result of the availability of water power for numerous mills. These include the Waltham Abbey Royal Gunpowder Mills (originally a fulling mill but already producing gunpowder by 1665), the 19th century Royal Small Arms Factory at Enfield and Wright's Flour Mill (Greater London's last surviving working mill) at Ponders End. Further south at Bow is the Three Mills tidal complex.

In the 18th century Bow porcelain factory flourished. In the 19th century the lower Lea became an important area for the manufacture of chemicals, in part based on the supply of by-products such as sulphur and ammonia from the Gas Light and Coke Company's works at Bow Common. Other industries included Bryant and May, Berger Paints, Stratford Railway Works and confectionery manufacturer Clarnico (later Trebor). Where the river meets the Thames were the Orchard House Yard and Thames Ironworks shipyards.

In the 20th century the combination of transport, wide expanses of flat land and electricity from riverside and canal-side plants such as Brimsdown, Hackney, Bow and West Ham led to expansion of industries including for example Enfield Rolling Mills and Enfield Cables, Thorn Electrical Industries, Belling, Glover and Main, MK Electric, Gestetner, JAP Industries, Ferguson Electronics, Hotpoint, Lesney (original makers of Matchbox toys), a Ford components (later Visteon) plant and Johnson Matthey. Much industry has now gone, replaced by warehousing and retail parks.

== Small scale farming ==
North of Cheshunt the Lea Valley, particularly around Nazeing, is associated with market gardening, nurseries and garden centres. The industry once dominated the area from Ponders End, north through Enfield Lock, Waltham Cross and Cheshunt, to Wormley, Turnford and Nazeing, and spawned industries such as Pan Britannica Industries. In the 1930s the valley contained the largest concentration of greenhouses in the world. Stamp writing in 1948 described how glasshouses, originally established on the 'warm brickearth soils' of Tottenham and Edmonton in the 1880s, had been progressively driven north into the often poorer soils further north by the growth of London. At the same time the growth of industry had intensified the lack of winter sunshine. Today, in most parts south of Cheshunt greenhouses have been replaced by residential areas.

== Protection and preservation ==
The Lee Valley Park occupies large areas of the valley. An extensive area of open land, built up using rubble from the Blitz, is Hackney Marshes. By contrast, Walthamstow Marshes is retained as a Site of Special Scientific Interest (SSSI).

== See also ==
- Lee Navigation
- Lower Lea Valley
- Markfield Beam Engine
