= The Rose and Crown, Clay Hill =

Pub in Clay Hill, London

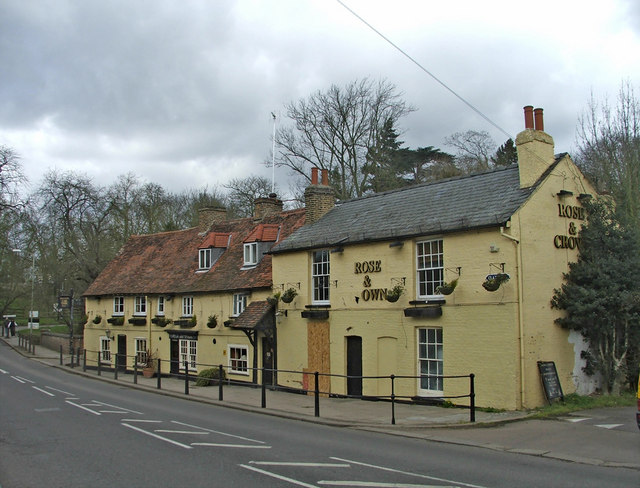
- The Rose and Crown Public House

- Location within London Borough of Enfield Location within Greater London

General information
- Location: Clay Hill, in the London Borough of Enfield, London, England
- Coordinates: 51.6712°N 0.0837°W

Design and construction
- Designations

Listed Building – Grade II
- Official name: The Rose and Crown Public House
- Designated: 19 March 1951
- Reference no.: 1079555

The Rose and Crown is a grade II listed public house in Clay Hill, Enfield.
