= Finchley Gap =

Topographical feature in Finchley, London

Coordinates: 51.6°N 0.2°W

Location of the "Finchley Gap" (Greater London, UK).

The Finchley Gap (or "Finchley depression") is a location centred on Church End, Finchley, in north London, England. As a topographical feature approximately eight kilometres wide, lying between higher ground to the north-west (Mill Hill) and to the south-east (Hampstead Heath), it has probably existed for the last one million years or more.

The Finchley Gap has lower ground to the north-east (the catchment area of the River Lea), and the south-west (the catchment area of the River Brent). The North Circular Road (A406) passes over the Gap, from one catchment area to the other.

The geological history of the Finchley Gap, and its place in the history of academic research, makes it one of the most interesting topographical features of the London area.

The principal geological formation in the Finchley Gap region, as in much of the London Basin, is Eocene London Clay. This is mostly a stiff blue-brown clay, over 100 metres thick. In parts of this region, a relatively thin, upper part of the London Clay formation, sandier in content and known as the Claygate Beds, is also found. In certain areas of relatively limited extent, such as on the higher parts of Harrow on the Hill, Hampstead and Highgate, the London Clay and Claygate Beds are overlain by sandy Eocene Bagshot Beds. All these formations are overlain in several areas by much younger Pleistocene formations, as explained below.

From 1938 until the 1960s, it was supposed that the River Thames once flowed through the Gap, along the line of a "Middlesex loopway" running from somewhere around Harefield to the Hoddesdon-Ware area. This supposition was later shown to be erroneous.

Prior to the Anglian glaciation, the "proto-Mole-Wey"river, a then south bank tributary of the "proto-Thames", flowed northwards from the Weald, through Richmond and the Finchley Gap, to the Hoddesdon-Ware area. There, it joined the proto-Thames (which at that time was flowing north-eastwards, through the Vale of St Albans).

About 450,000 years ago, a lobe of the Anglian ice sheet advanced up the valley of the proto-Mole-Wey at least as far south as the Finchley Gap. There, the ice left glacial drift which today is up to 18 metres in thickness.

Another lobe of the Anglian ice sheet moved up the Vale of St Albans, thus diverting the Thames southwards. When this happened, the proto-Mole-Wey was cut off at Richmond.

The Finchley Gap now lies on the watershed of the catchment areas of the Rivers Brent and Lea, both south-flowing tributaries of the Thames.

== The "Middlesex loopway" hypothesis - Context ==
It has been known since the nineteenth century that an ice sheet once descended from the north of England as far as north London and left behind extensive spreads of till and other glacial deposits. Lobes of this ice sheet extended up two valleys, oriented south-west to north-east, reaching as far south as Watford and Finchley.

In the early twentieth century, it was suggested that the River Thames, after descending through Oxfordshire, entering the London Basin near Goring and running north-east from there, continued in that direction prior to the ice advance, past Watford and along the line of the Vale of St Albans. It was concluded that the Thames must have been diverted to its more southerly course of today by the ice advance up the Vale of St Albans to Watford.

These hypotheses have since been confirmed by much subsequent research, some of which is cited in this article. In fact, in the Early Pleistocene, the Thames flowed somewhat north-west of, but parallel to, today's Vale of St Albans, then continued towards North Norfolk on its journey to the North Sea. By the Middle Pleistocene, the Thames was flowing through the Vale of St Albans itself and was heading to the North Sea further south, in the Colchester area.

== The "loopway" hypothesis ==
In 1938, it was suggested by the British geomorphologist S.W. Wooldridge that the River Thames had been diverted from its course through the Vale of St Albans to roughly its present, more southerly, course, in two stages. This two-stage hypothesis was presented again over the subsequent three decades in several publications.

In the first stage, it was assumed that "local or Chiltern ice" advanced from the north-west across the line of the Thames "in the neighbourhood of St. Albans", thus blocking the river and forcing it to find a more southerly course. It was suggested that the Thames thus turned roughly eastwards from around Harefield, passed north of Harrow on the Hill, went through the Finchley depression, and then continued north-eastwards "to rejoin its former line near Ware". (As explained below, this hypothesis of a "Chiltern" ice advance is not now accepted.)

It was later suggested that the section of the supposed "Middlesex loopway" going north-east beyond the Finchley depression "may well have originated as a ... south-bank tributary of an earlier axial line of drainage even though it later served for the diverted Thames". This "south-bank tributary" would have been the proto-Mole-Wey. In his 1938 paper, Wooldridge suggested that deposits which do exist in this eastern section of the "Middlesex loopway" (known today as Dollis Hill Gravel) were "possible" gravels laid down by the Thames. (This too has since been shown to be a false assumption.)

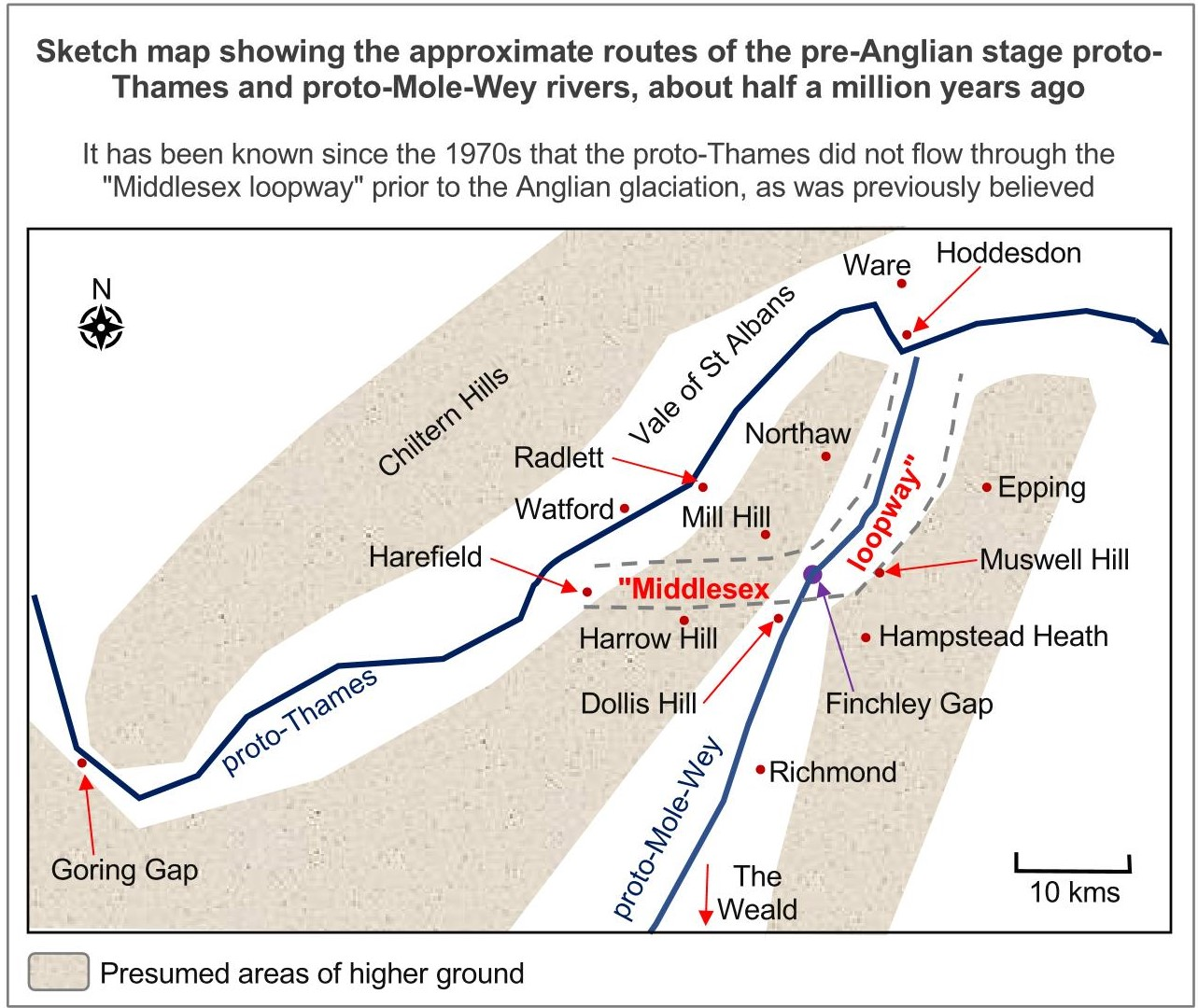

The almost complete absence of any gravels which might have been deposited by the diverted Thames in the western section of the "Middlesex loopway" (between Harefield and the Finchley depression) was judged by Wooldridge to be a "slight" consideration, bearing in mind "how extensively the London Clay surface has been dissected and lowered here".

The second stage in the diversion of the Thames supposedly took place "a long period of time" after the first stage. During an ice advance referred to by Wooldridge (1938) as that of the "Eastern Drift" (and today known as that of the Anglian stage), lobes of the ice sheet advanced from the north-east along the Vale of St Albans towards Watford, and towards the Finchley depression. The Thames was diverted to a more southerly course, through Richmond, beyond the furthest reach of the Anglian ice sheet.

== The "loopway" hypothesis dispelled ==
No deposits which were unambiguously of Thames origin were ever found along the line of the "Middlesex loopway".

In the 1970s, detailed study of deposits in the Vale of St Albans led researchers to the conclusion that the River Thames never flowed through the Finchley depression. Instead, it was established that the river stayed on a course north-eastward through the Vale of St Albans until it was diverted, by the Anglian ice advance, approximately 450,000 years ago. The river was diverted to a more southerly route, roughly along the line of that followed by today's river.

Furthermore, by the 1980s, evidence for a "Chiltern Drift" glaciation, which Wooldridge believed had diverted the Thames from the Vale of St Albans into its supposed intermediate route through the Finchley depression, had been seriously challenged. And, although the pre-Anglian history of glaciations in Britain is known to be complex, and is still the subject of varying interpretations, the hypothesis of a pre-Anglian "Chiltern" glaciation is today nowhere supported.

Gravels in the eastern section of the "Middlesex loopway", shown on current geological maps as "Dollis Hill Gravel", have been demonstrated to be deposits of the proto-Mole-Wey river, not of the River Thames.

The "Middlesex loopway" hypothesis has thus been definitively rejected.

== The "proto-Mole-Wey" valley and the formation of the Finchley Gap ==
The dissected plateau which lies to the south-east of the Vale of St Albans and north-west of the Finchley Gap, stretching from Bushey Heath, to Potters Bar, Northaw and beyond, is capped over wide areas, at altitudes ranging from about 150m to 130m, by a fairly thin (average 3 metres) layer of sand and gravel known as Pebble Gravel (or, in places, Stanmore Gravel).

Although flint is the main component of this gravel, it has been known since the late nineteenth century that it also contains in places a notable quantity of chert derived from Lower Greensand Beds in the Weald. It was suggested early on that this "pointed to the former existence of streams from that area".

S.W. Wooldridge later suggested that it was in fact "a river of major dimensions" (which) "entered from the south" that was responsible for transporting much of this chert to areas which are now north of the River Thames. It was clear from the broad course which Wooldridge plotted for this river that it was an ancestor of the River Mole (and/or River Wey).

In 1994, D.R. Bridgland proposed that Pebble Gravel (or Stanmore Gravel) which is located on Harrow Weald Common (near Bushey Heath) was deposited by an ancestral Mole-Wey, and that that river was a tributary of the River Thames at a time when the latter river was flowing to the north-west of the Vale of St Albans. This could have been nearly two million years ago. He also suggested that similar gravel, located further north-east near Northaw at a slightly lower altitude, was also deposited by an ancestral Mole-Wey, but at a later date (which could have been around 1.75 million years ago).

At those times, the topography of the country around today's Finchley Gap would have been very different, because the Pebble Gravel was laid down in a valley bottom, whereas today it occupies the highest ground. The relief has been inverted.

But, in 1979, P.L. Gibbard mapped younger deposits, known as Dollis Hill Gravel and named after one of the locations where this deposit is found, which were also laid down by the proto-Mole-Wey river. These deposits are found at what is today the Finchley Gap, and to the north-east and south-west of it. Dollis Hill Gravel is found, for example, south-west of the Gap at Hendon and Horsenden Hill, and north-east of the Gap over wide areas from Southgate to Goff's Oak. Today, the highest of those deposits rest at an altitude of around 100 metres (for example at Muswell Hill and Cockfosters). So the Finchley Gap, in the sense of being an area of lower ground lying between higher ground on either side (at Mill Hill and Hampstead Heath, both at altitudes of over 120 metres today), must have existed by the time those highest deposits of Dollis Hill Gravel were laid down.

The highest Dollis Hill Gravel deposits at 100 metres have not been dated precisely. But deposits of Gerrards Cross Gravel (which were laid down by the proto-Thames) have been tentatively estimated to be nearly one million years old, and such deposits have been mapped, at a similar altitude, some 8 km to the north-west near Radlett. There is no certainty that the oldest Dollis Hill Gravel was laid down at exactly the same time as the Gerrards Cross Gravel, but the ages are probably comparable, because, in any given section of the London Basin, the altitude of river-borne Pleistocene deposits is normally closely correlated with their age.

So it follows from all this that the Finchley Gap was created by the proto-Mole-Wey river, which was, and had been for some time before the Gap evolved, a south-bank tributary of the proto-Thames. It is also possible to deduce, though more cautiously, that the land where the Gap is now found first became an area of lower ground lying between higher ground on either side at least one million years ago.

== The Anglian glaciation and its aftermath ==
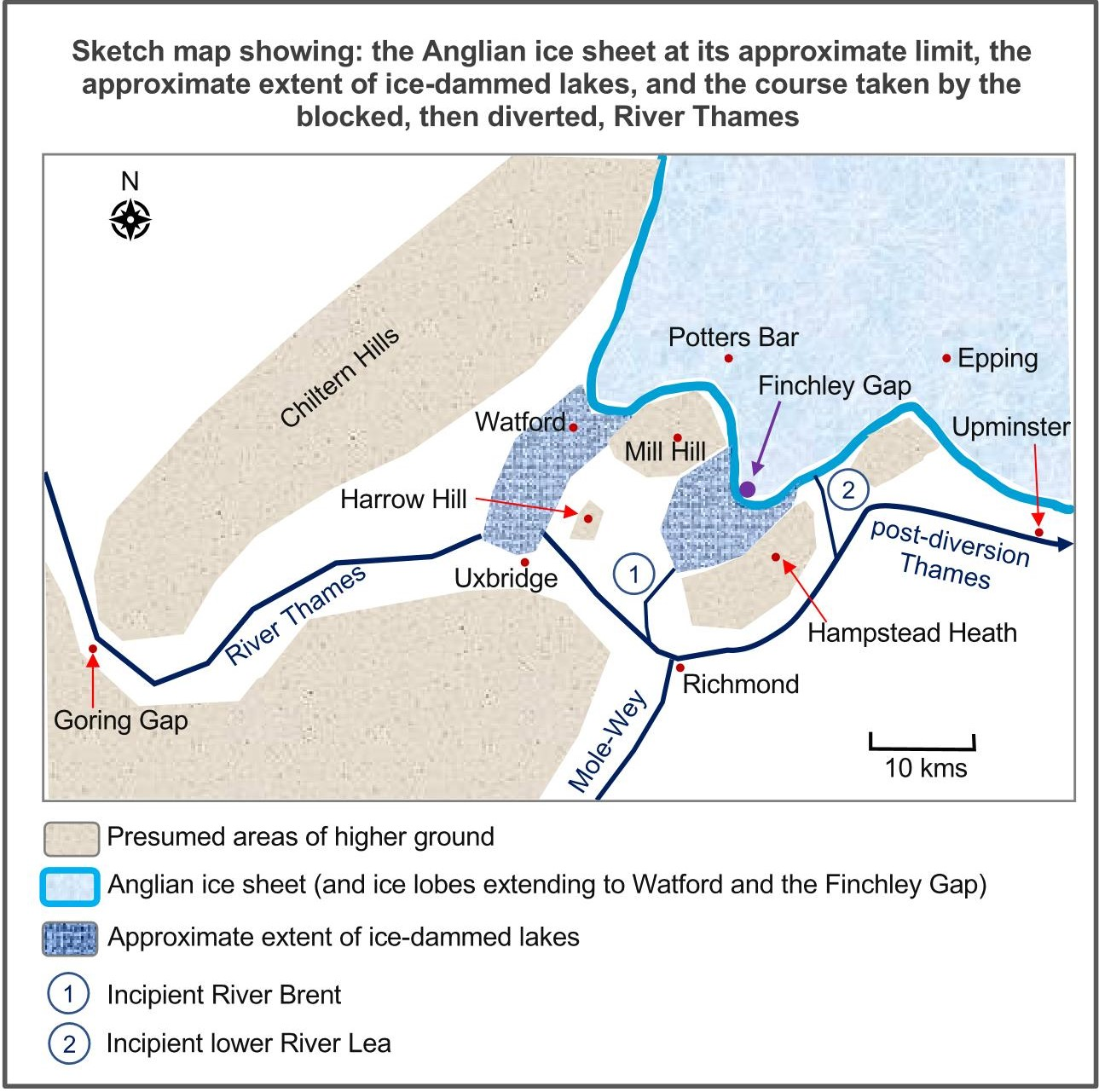

The only Pleistocene glaciation in Britain which produced an ice sheet that reached as far south as London was the Anglian glaciation of about 450,000 years ago. The ice sheet which then came down from the north of England (and Scandinavia) covered the greater part of East Anglia and passed over the northern part of the Chiltern Hills. When it reached as far south as Ware it divided into two lobes. One of those lobes advanced up the valley of the proto-Thames, in the Vale of St Albans, as far as Watford. The other lobe advanced up the valley of the proto-Mole-Wey at least as far south as the Finchley Gap.

Both rivers found their passage blocked. Lakes thus began to rise in front of the ice sheet. Lacustrine deposits laid down in these lakes have been identified. As the water rose, it spilled over lower points along the watersheds of these valleys into adjacent valleys. In particular, rising water from the proto-Thames lake spilled over into the valley of the proto-Mole-Wey north of Uxbridge; and rising water from the lakes of both rivers spilled over into whatever valley then existed to the east, somewhere just beyond Richmond.

The proto-Mole-Way was thus cut off around Richmond, where it joined the diverted Thames.

When the ice sheet began to melt, it left behind substantial layers of till and other glacial deposits. In particular, in the locality of the Finchley Gap, the ice left glacial deposits which today are up to 18 metres in thickness. And meltwater which poured from the front and sides of the Finchley Gap ice lobe carved routes southwards, west of Hampstead Heath, towards the newly-diverted Thames. This process thus reversed the previous direction of drainage and initiated today's drainage network of the River Brent (which in its upper section, north of Hendon, is the Dollis Brook), and Mutton Brook.

A similar process led to the creation of the south-flowing lower section of the River Lea, which was able to establish a link to the diverted Thames to the east of Hampstead Heath. Drainage from the glacial till left by the ice lobe to the north-east of the Finchley Gap carved routes which led to the River Lea, thus initiating the drainage network of Bounds Green Brook and Pymmes Brook.

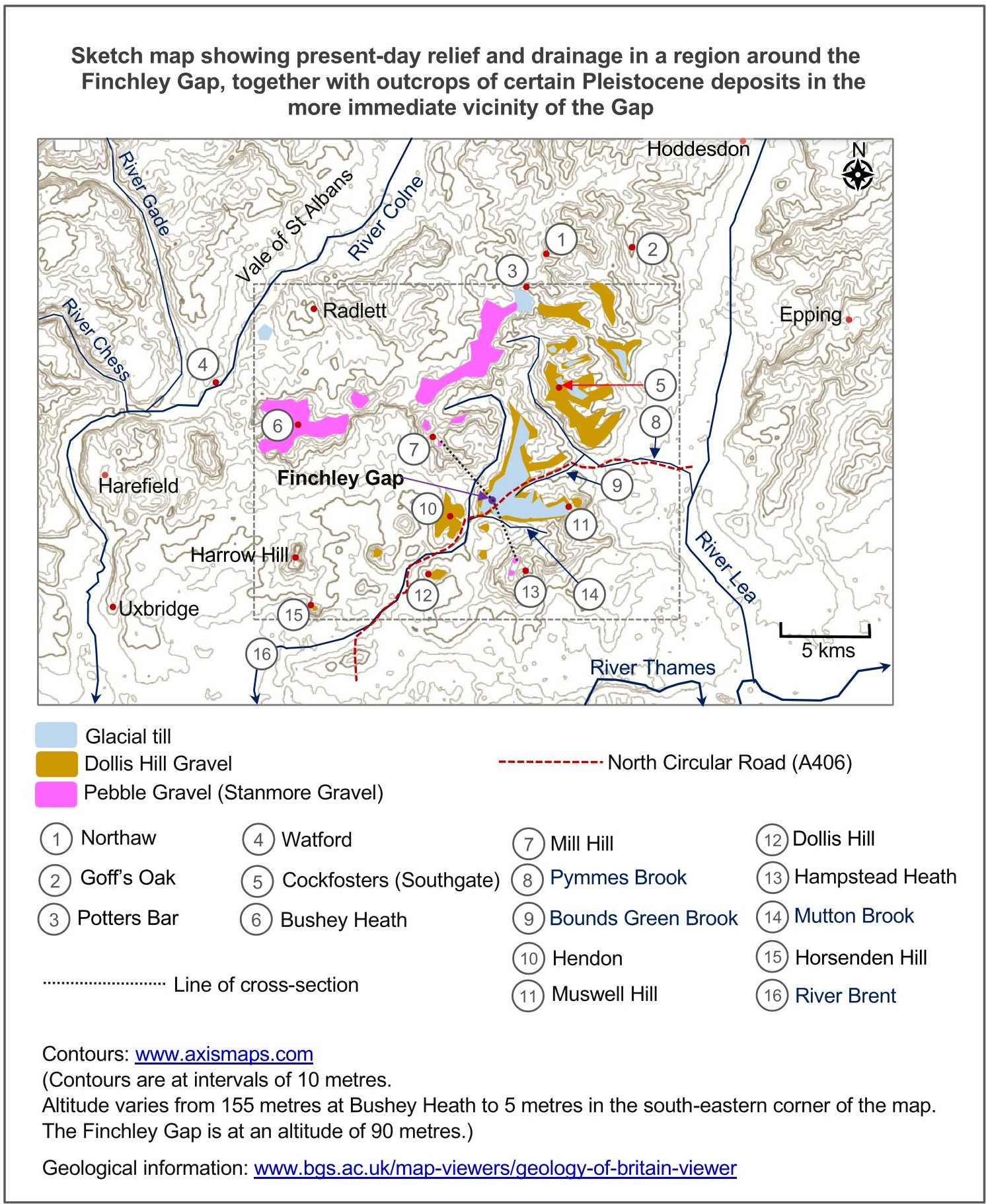

Thus, during the latter part of the Anglian stage and subsequently, the topography of the Finchley Gap area was transformed. From having been a section of valley floor into which drainage flowed (at the time of the proto-Mole-Wey river), it became a relatively elevated area of land (on glacial till) from which drainage flows into nearby streams. But it is still a "gap" or "depression" today in the sense that it is an area of lower ground which lies between higher ground to the north-west and south-east.

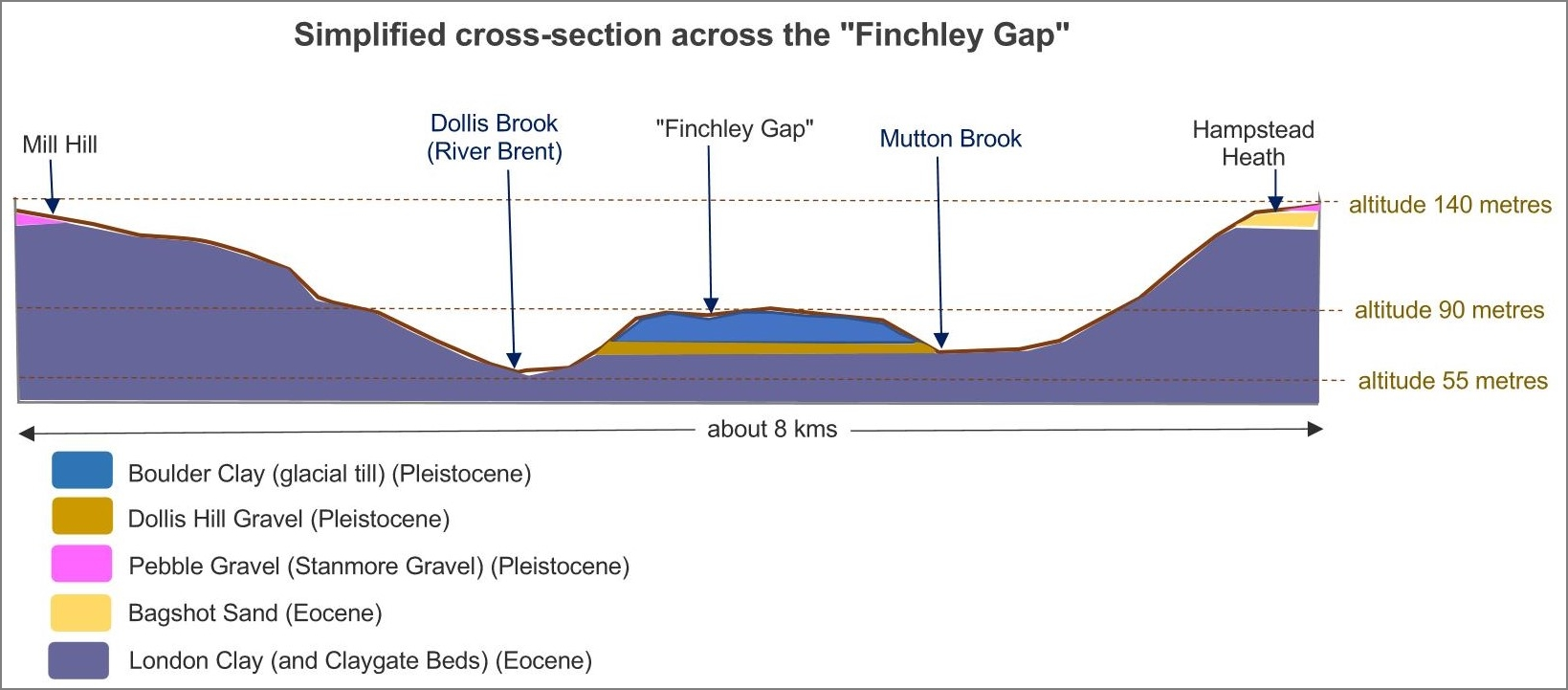
