= Charlie Brown's, Limehouse =

Pub in London, England, c. 1840 to 1989

Coordinates: 51.5088°N 0.0247°W

Charlie Brown's was the common name for the Railway Tavern pub in Poplar, London.

The pub was built c. 1840 on the corner of Garford Street and the West India Dock Road and greatly extended in 1919. The pub was demolished in November 1989 during construction of the Limehouse Link tunnel.

== Source of the name ==
Charlie Brown was the landlord of the pub from 1893 until his death in June 1932.

The exotic location in Chinatown, the character of the landlord and his ever growing collection of curiosities from around the world made Charlie Brown's a tourist attraction.

"Following his death, the 'uncrowned king of Limehouse' lay in state in his pub and his funeral procession was one of the biggest the East End had ever seen with 16,000 people gathered at Bow Cemetery."

While the pub was rarely referred to as the Railway Tavern once Charlie Brown became the landlord, it was not formally renamed as Charlie Brown's until 1972.

== Second Charlie Brown's ==
On his death, Charlie Brown's daughter Ethel took over the pub.

His son (also Charlie Brown) took over the Blue Posts, directly opposite, but in 1938 moved to South Woodford to the Roundabout pub, which he renamed Charlie Brown's Roundabout. Located adjacent to a ground level roundabout for local arterial roads, the pub was demolished in 1972 when the roundabout was enlarged to allow aspects of the North Circular to have flyovers onto the newly built M11 motorway. However, the name Charlie Brown's Roundabout was applied by London as the official name of the expanded roundabout, and has also been adopted as an unofficial local landmark name for the Woodford Roundabout Viaduct – the flyover above the roundabout giving access to the M11 motorway.
