= Chiswick flyover =

Elevated section of motorway in England

Coordinates: 51.49200°N 0.28270°W

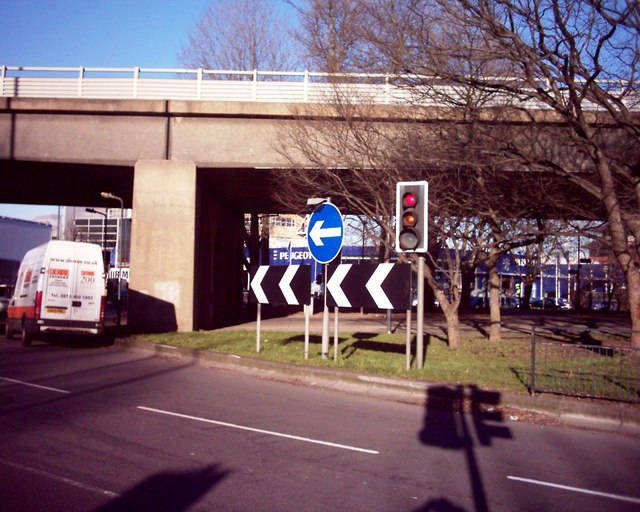
Chiswick Roundabout with the flyover above

The Chiswick flyover is a short elevated section of the M4 motorway in the western approaches to London, United Kingdom. The flyover in the west London suburb of Chiswick, was opened in 1959 with the intention of reducing congestion and the impact on local traffic of vehicles travelling around London on the North and South Circular Roads and between London and the west on the Great West Road. Although it was not originally built as a motorway, it was later incorporated into the M4 motorway.

== Description ==
The original Chiswick flyover carries the first half a mile of the M4 from its start at junction number 1. The flyover was extended to be over two miles long in the early 1960s, forming part of the M4 junction 1 to junction 5 section that was opened in 1965. The first one-and-a-half miles of the flyover tracks the course of the A4 which is directly beneath it, effectively forming a two-tier road system. It then turns approximately west north-west across Boston Manor Park before the M4 returns to ground level, and widens from two to three lanes in each direction as it heads west through the grounds of Osterley Park.

== History ==
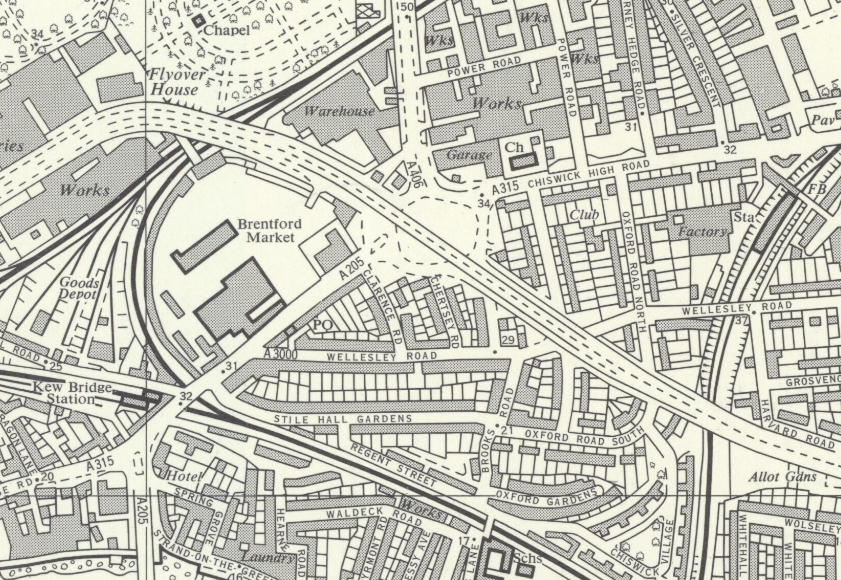
Chiswick Flyover on Ordnance Survey Map, 1960, before incorporation into the M4 Flyover

The flyover, built at a cost of £6 million, was provided to relieve the congestion at Chiswick Roundabout, the junction of Chiswick High Road, North Circular Road, South Circular Road and the Great West Road, caused by 40,000 cars per day using the junction. The opening ceremony for the flyover, which was performed by Hollywood actress Jayne Mansfield, took place on 30 September 1959. The second section opened on 25 November 1964.

In 1964 the flyover became part of the M4 motorway and by 1969 was said to be the most dangerous road in Britain. By 2009, 97,000 vehicles per day were using the M4 over flyover. In October 2009, actress Imogen Stubbs unveiled a plaque in a ceremony in Chiswick to celebrate the fiftieth anniversary of the opening of the flyover.

== Design detail ==
The flyover was not originally built to motorway standards. The structure was half a mile long (0.8 kilometres) and fifty-nine feet (18 metres) wide with hard-shoulders of no more than four feet (1.2 metres) wide. 100 tonnes (110 tons) of concrete went into each of the columns supporting the road.

== Folklore ==
Rumours arose that the bodies of the victims of the Kray twins, notorious London gangsters, were entombed in the concrete pillars of the flyover.

== See also ==
- M4 motorway
- Carville Hall (Brentford)
- Golden Mile (Brentford)
