= Finchley United Synagogue =

Orthodox Jewish synagogue in London, England

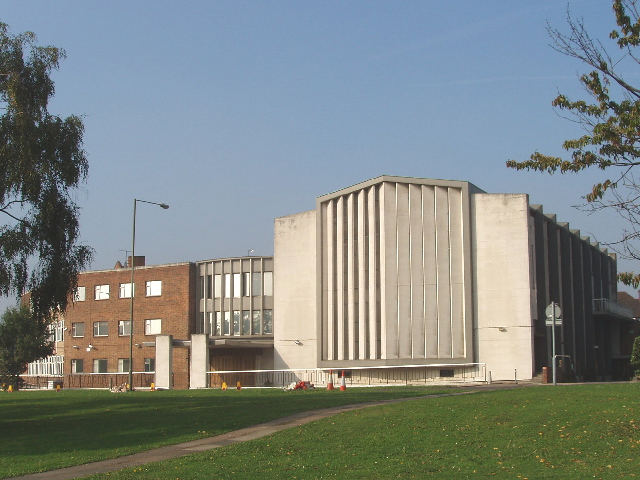
- The synagogue in 2005

- Location of the synagogue in Greater London

Religion
- Affiliation: Orthodox Judaism
- Rite: Nusach Ashkenaz; Persian Sephardi
- Ecclesiastical or organisational status: Synagogue
- Leadership: Rabbi Dr Yoni Birnbaum; Rabbi Josh Harris; Rabbi Yisroel Fine; Rabbi L Heller (Attendant)
- Status: Active

Location
- Location: Kinloss Gardens, Finchley, Borough of Barnet, London, England N3 3DU
- Country: United Kingdom
- Coordinates: 51°35′25″N 0°12′07″W

Architecture
- Completed: 1967
- Capacity: 1,400 worshipers

Website
- kinloss.org.uk

Finchley United Synagogue, more commonly known as Kinloss Synagogue, is an Orthodox Jewish congregation and synagogue, located at Kinloss Gardens in Finchley, in the Borough of Barnet, in London, England, in the United Kingdom. The synagogue is located close to Henlys Corner on the North Circular Road.

The congregation is a member of the United Synagogue, and worships in the Ashkenazi rite. There is also a Persian Sephardi synagogue within the building.

The main synagogue opened in 1967 and holds up to 1,400 people.

== See also ==
- History of the Jews in England
- List of Jewish communities in the United Kingdom
- List of synagogues in the United Kingdom
