= Hanger Lane =

Major road in the London Borough of Ealing

Coordinates: 51°31′16″N 0°17′30″W

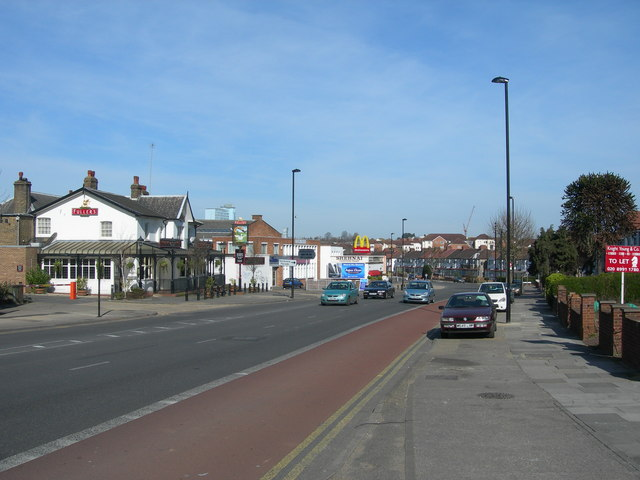
Hanger Lane

Hanger Lane is a major road in Ealing, London, England. The majority of the road forms the westernmost part of the A406 North Circular Road, running north from the A4020 Uxbridge Road at Ealing Common to the A40 Western Avenue at the Hanger Lane gyratory. This complex and busy junction incorporates Hanger Lane Underground station on the Central line of the London Underground. North of the gyratory, Hanger Lane continues along the A4005 to Vicar's Bridge and the border with Alperton in the London Borough of Brent.

The road takes its name from Hanger Hill, which is also the name of the surrounding area. The name comes from the Old English word hangra, meaning a wooded slope.
