= Wilmer Way footbridge =

Pedestrian bridge in London

Coordinates: 51.6148°N 0.1270°W

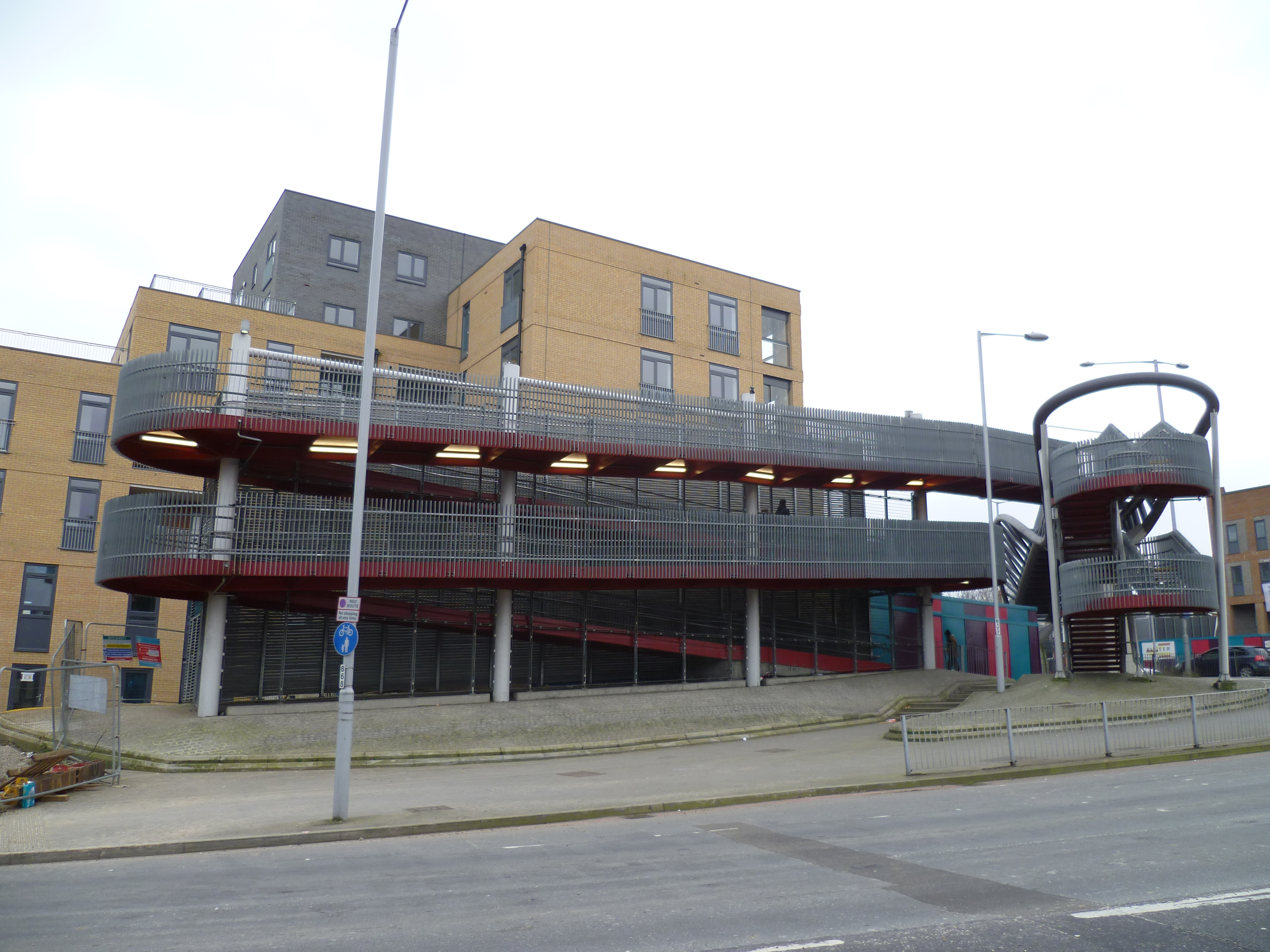
North end of Wilmer Way bridge.

The Wilmer Way footbridge is a pedestrian bridge over the North Circular Road in Arnos Grove, North London. The bridge links Wilmer Way in the north and Ollerton Road in the south.

== History ==
Construction of the bridge was part of the A406 Bounds Green improvement scheme by Transport for London. The bridge was opened in the summer of 2012 and replaced a pelican crossing.

A routine inspection by Transport for London in 2014 revealed defects in the structure, leading to the bridge's staircase being closed for repairs. Delays in carrying out the work resulted in questions being asked of Boris Johnson, the London Mayor, at the London Assembly during the Mayor's Question Time.

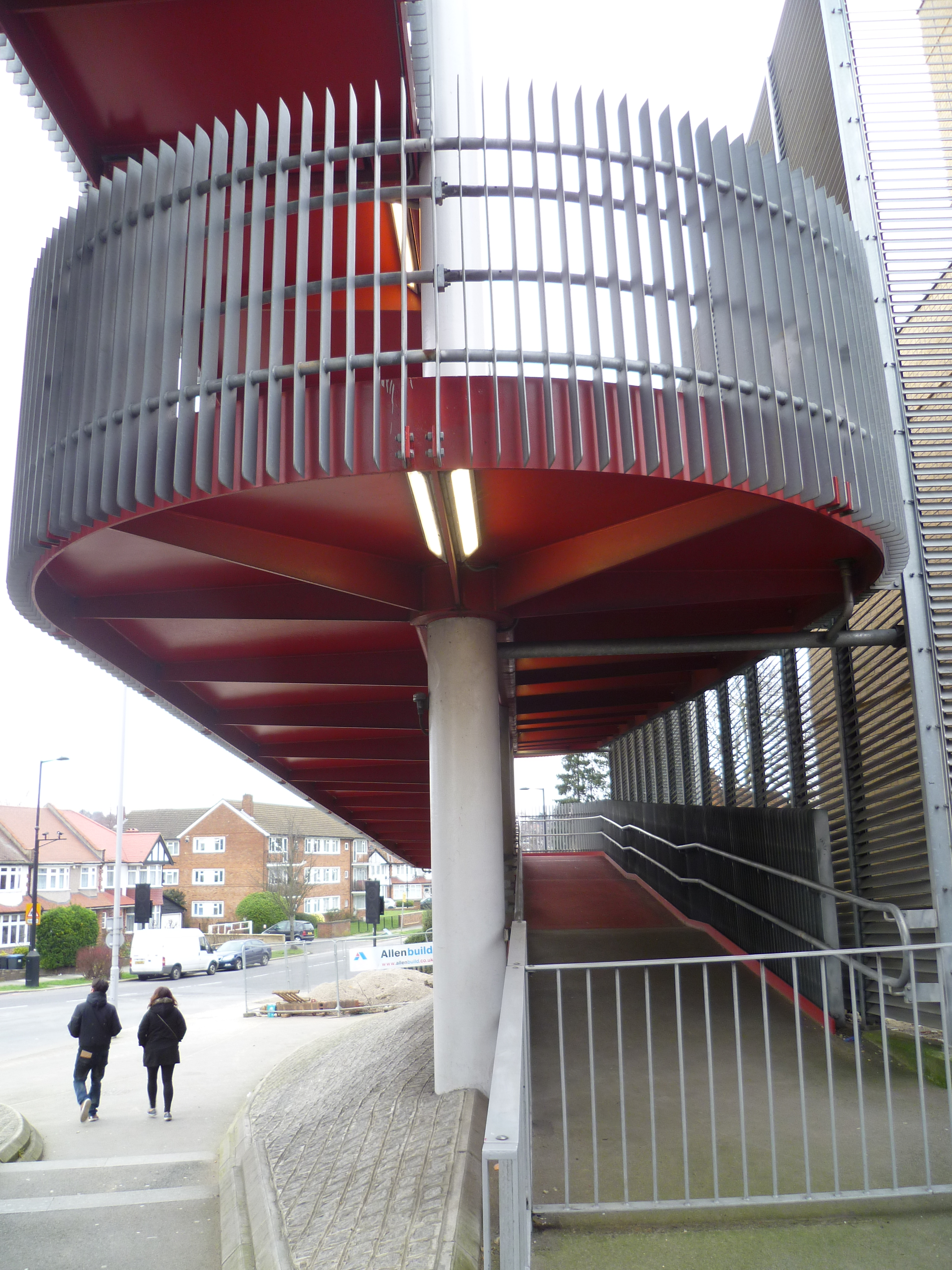
North end looking towards Wilmer Way.

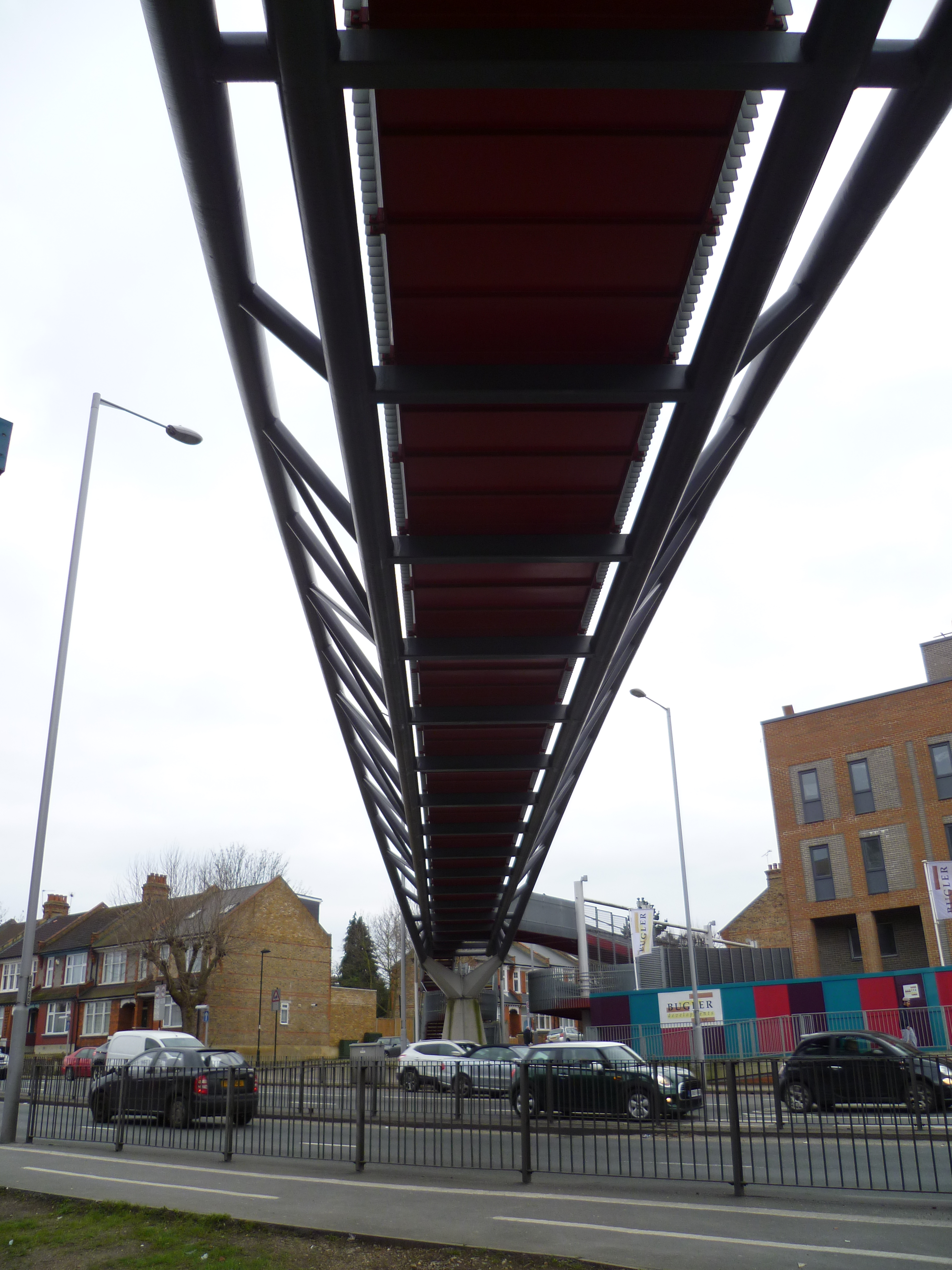
Looking towards Ollerton Road.

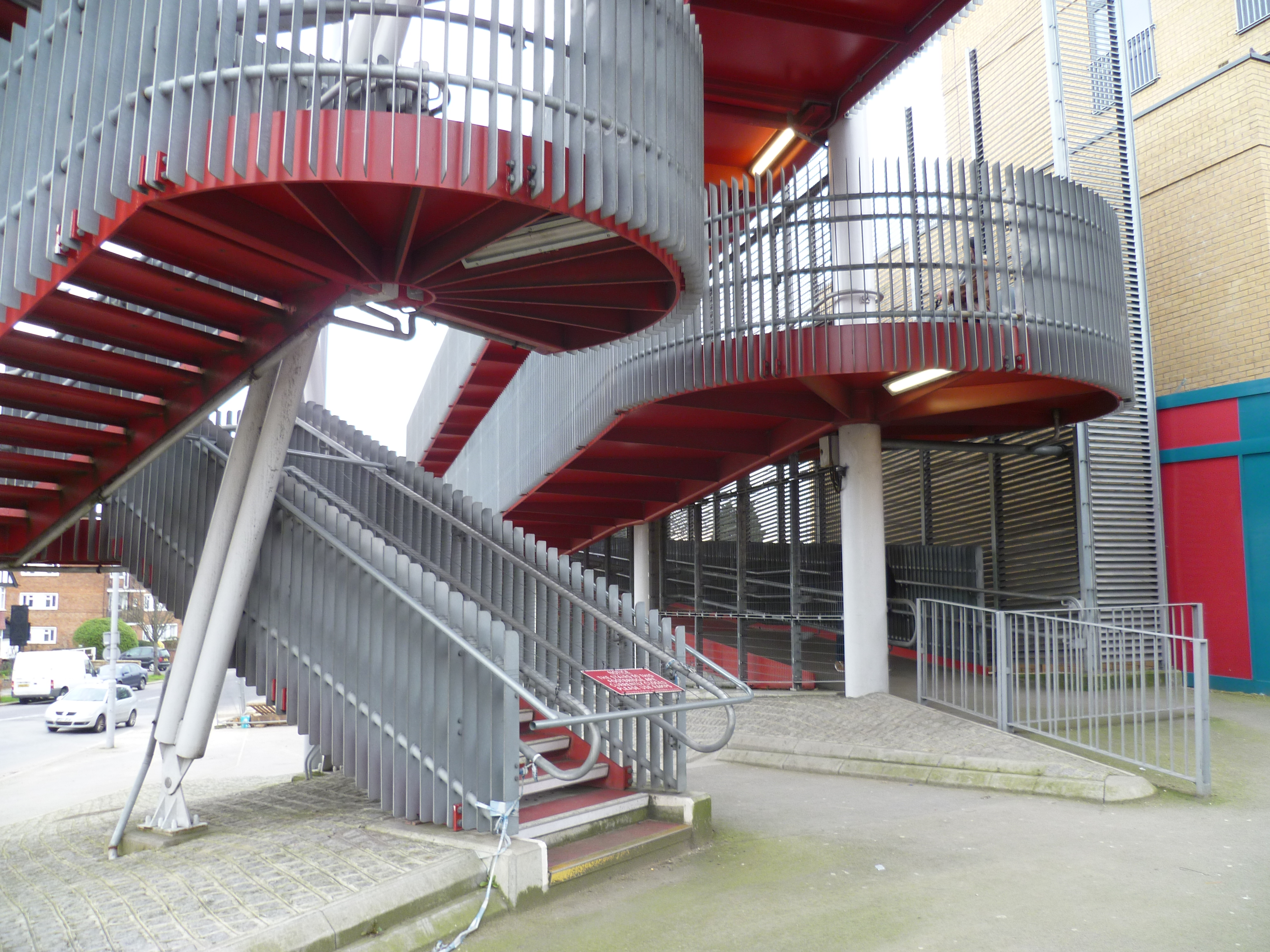
Closed staircase, north end, February 2016.
