= Arnos Park Viaduct =

Railway viaduct in London, England

Coordinates: 51.6204°N 0.1353°W

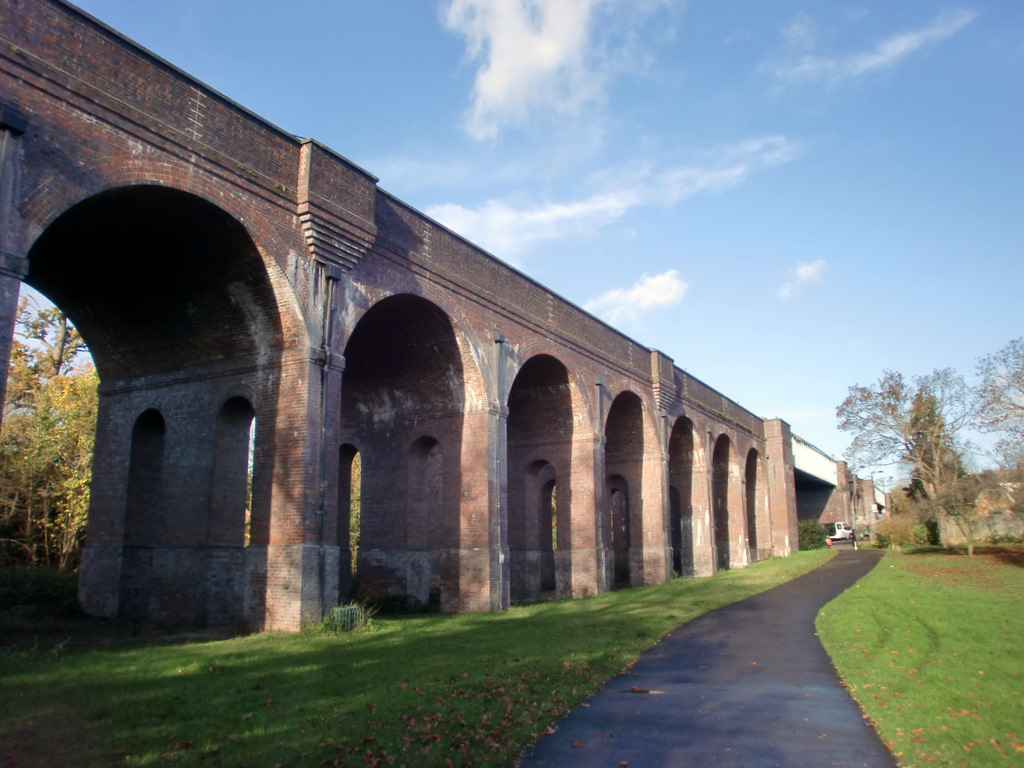
The viaduct from the east, with Waterfall Road on the right

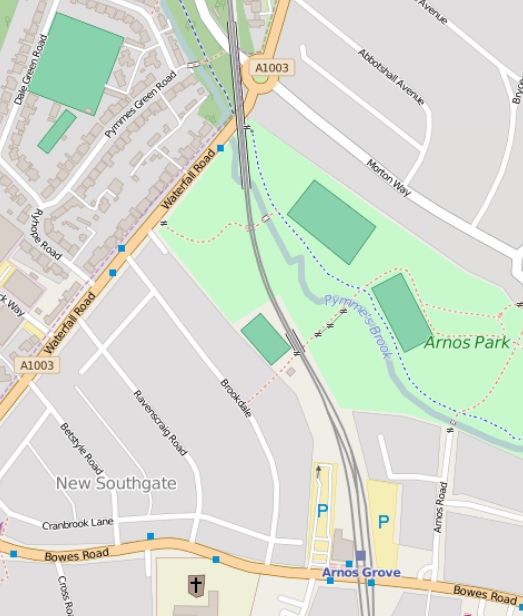
Location of the Arnos Park Viaduct

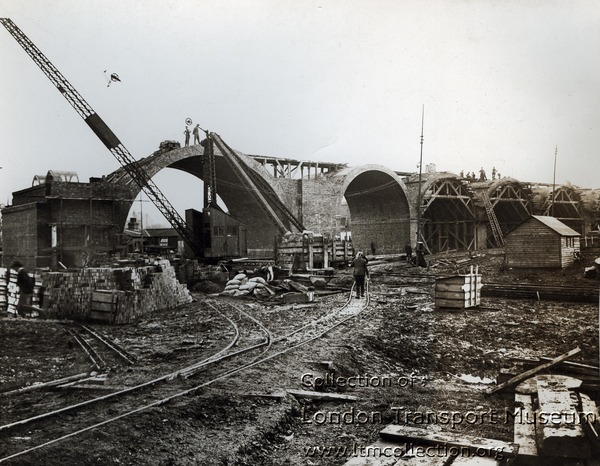
Arnos Park Viaduct under construction, 1932

The Arnos Park Viaduct is a railway viaduct of 34 brick arches that was built as part of the extension of London Underground's Piccadilly line from Finsbury Park in the south to Cockfosters in the north. It was built in 1932 and opened in 1933. It starts on the southern edge of Arnos Park soon after Arnos Grove station and ends on the northern side of the park, where the line enters a tunnel that continues to Southgate.

== Background ==
The viaduct was built as part of London Underground's project to extend the Piccadilly line from Finsbury Park in the south to Cockfosters in the north which started in 1930. The extension was built in stages, first to Arnos Grove station (opened 1932), then to Oakwood (then known as Enfield West), during which phase the viaduct was constructed, and finally to Cockfosters. The entire project cost more than £5 million.

== The viaduct ==
The viaduct starts at the southern edge of Arnos Park and ends on the northern side of Hampden Way, opposite Morton Way. The Pymmes Brook runs parallel to the viaduct in the north and then under it before continuing eastward. The viaduct is made of brick and consists of 34 numbered arches, broken only by two bridges where it passes over Waterfall Road and Hampden Way. The railway line then enters a tunnel half a mile long in which Southgate station is located before continuing north to Oakwood and Cockfosters. The combination of a viaduct followed fairly soon after by a long tunnel was made necessary by the need to keep the line as level as possible as it crossed the Pymmes Brook valley, then went under high ground at Southgate before continuing above ground to Oakwood and Cockfosters. The viaduct opened in 1933.

== Gallery ==
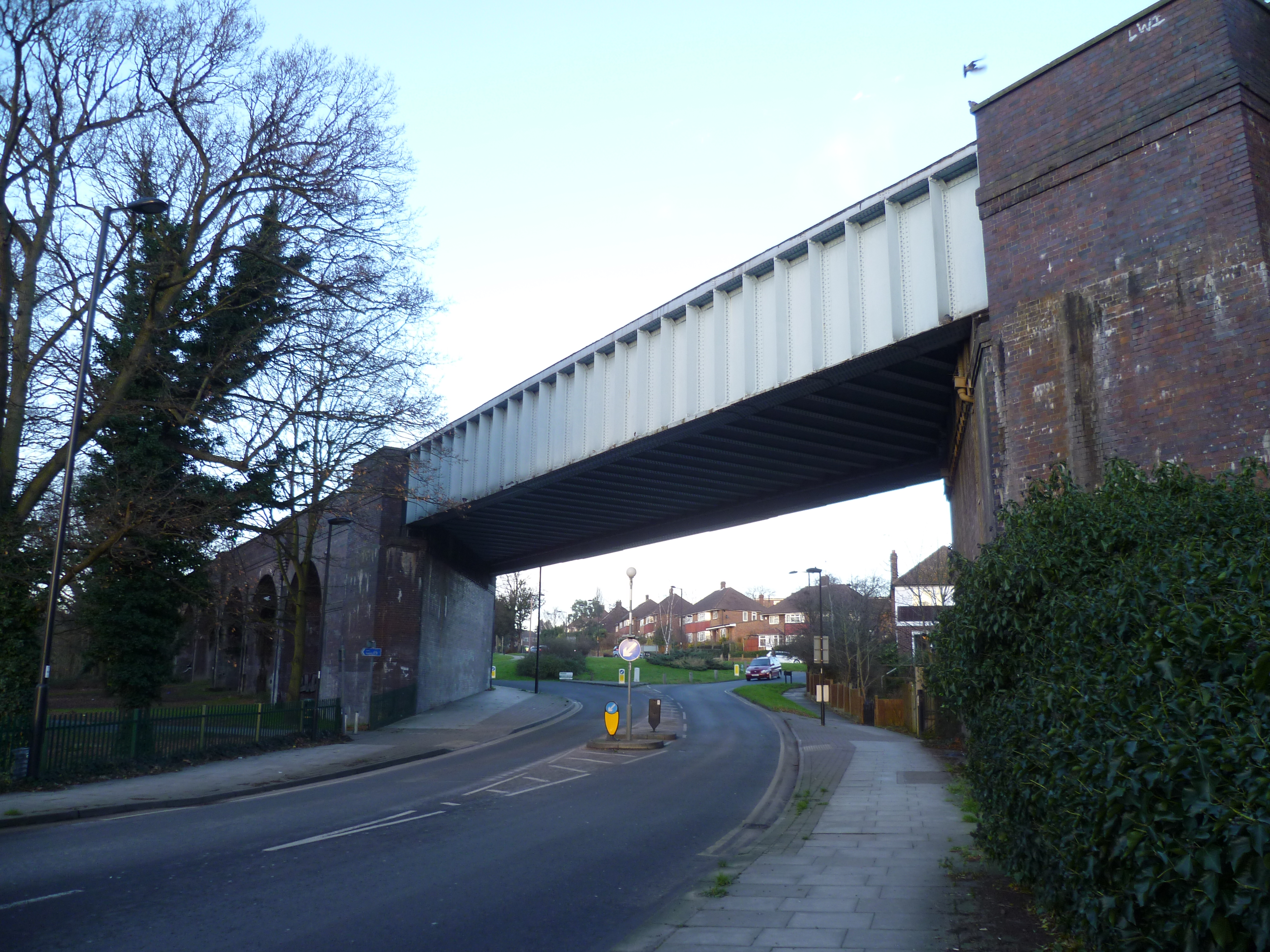
The bridge over Waterfall Road from the west

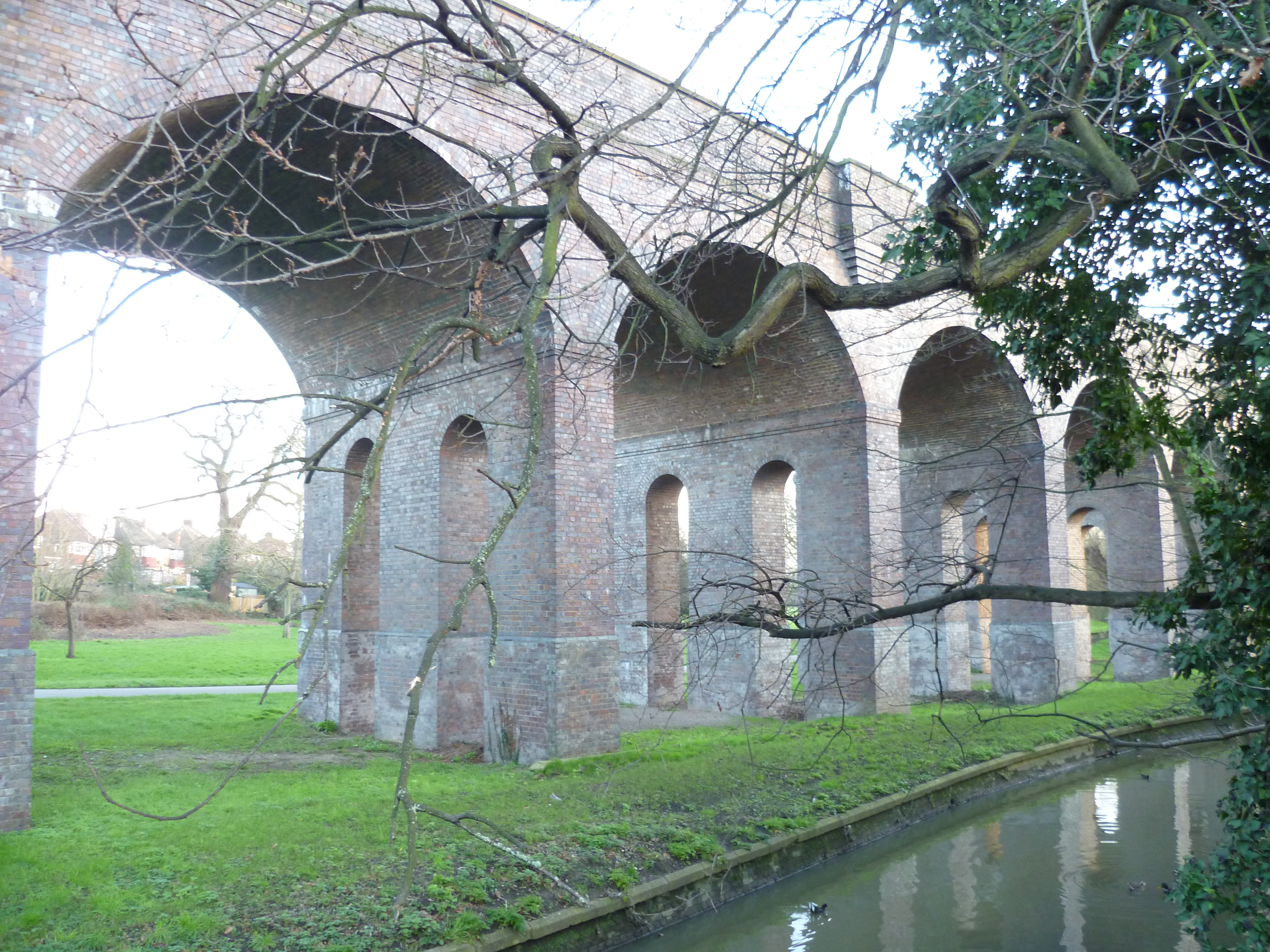
The viaduct viewed from Waterfall Road, with the Pymmes Brook in the foreground

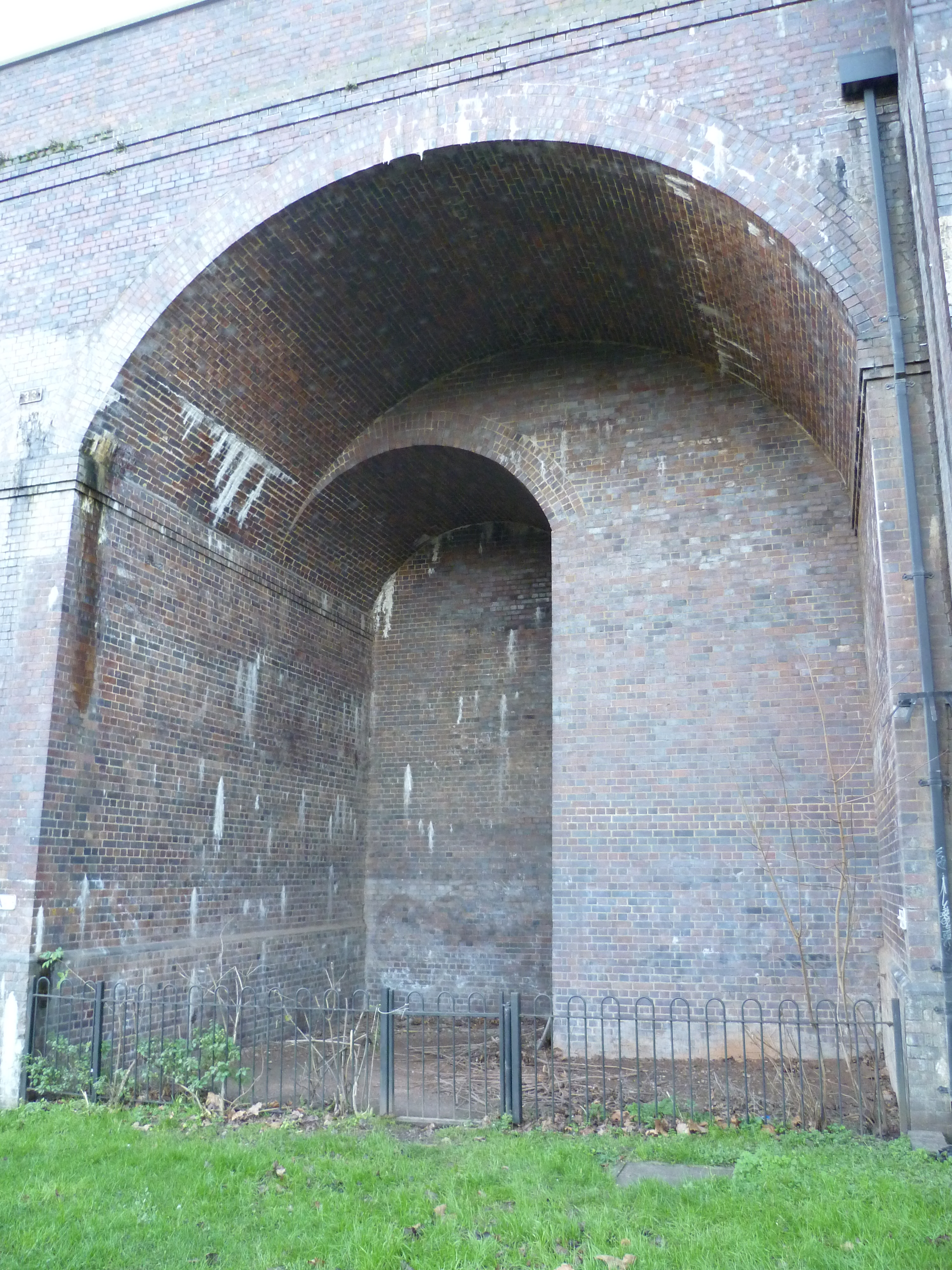
Blind arches near Waterfall Road
