= Arnos Grove =

Area of north London, England

Coordinates: 51.6163°N 0.1286°W

- Suburb
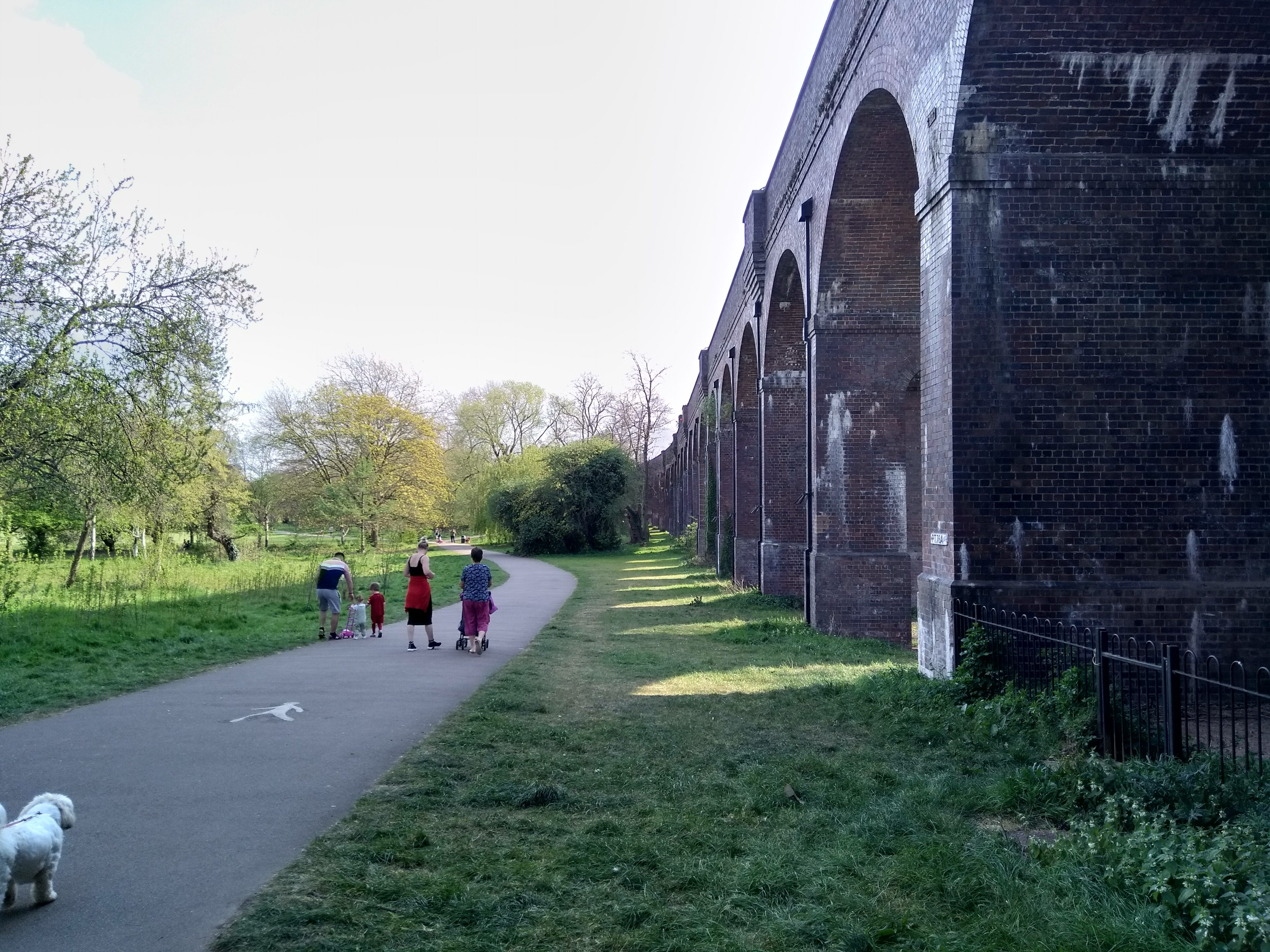
- Arnos Park

- Location within Greater London
- OS grid reference: TQ295925
- London borough: Enfield
- Ceremonial county: Greater London
- Region: London
- Country: England
- Sovereign state: United Kingdom
- Post town: LONDON
- Postcode district: N11, N14
- Dialling code: 020
- Police: Metropolitan
- Fire: London
- Ambulance: London
- UK Parliament: Southgate and Wood Green
- London Assembly: Enfield and Haringey

Arnos Grove (/ˈɑːnɒs ˈɡroʊv/) is an area of north London, England, within the London Borough of Enfield. It is centred 7.5 miles (12 km) north of Charing Cross. It is adjacent to New Southgate. The natural grove, larger than today, was for many centuries the largest woodland in the chapelry of Southgate in the parish of Edmonton. It became inter-related with Arnos Park when its owner was permitted to enclose much of its area through the widespread legal practice of inclosure of the common land to create the former park, the heart of which is now public parkland.

It is close to its borough's borders with two others: Barnet and Haringey. The area is centred 1km north of the North Circular Road.

The modern area of Arnos Grove is centred on the western end of Bowes Road. The estate from which it gets its name centred on what is now Morton Crescent. The road that runs from Morton Crescent eastward (to Southgate) is also called Arnos Grove.

== Etymology ==
The area's name derives from that of an estate called Arnoldes Grove or Arno's Grove, i.e. 'grove or copse of the Arnold family'. The Arnolds were local landowners who are mentioned in documents dating from the 14th century.

== History ==
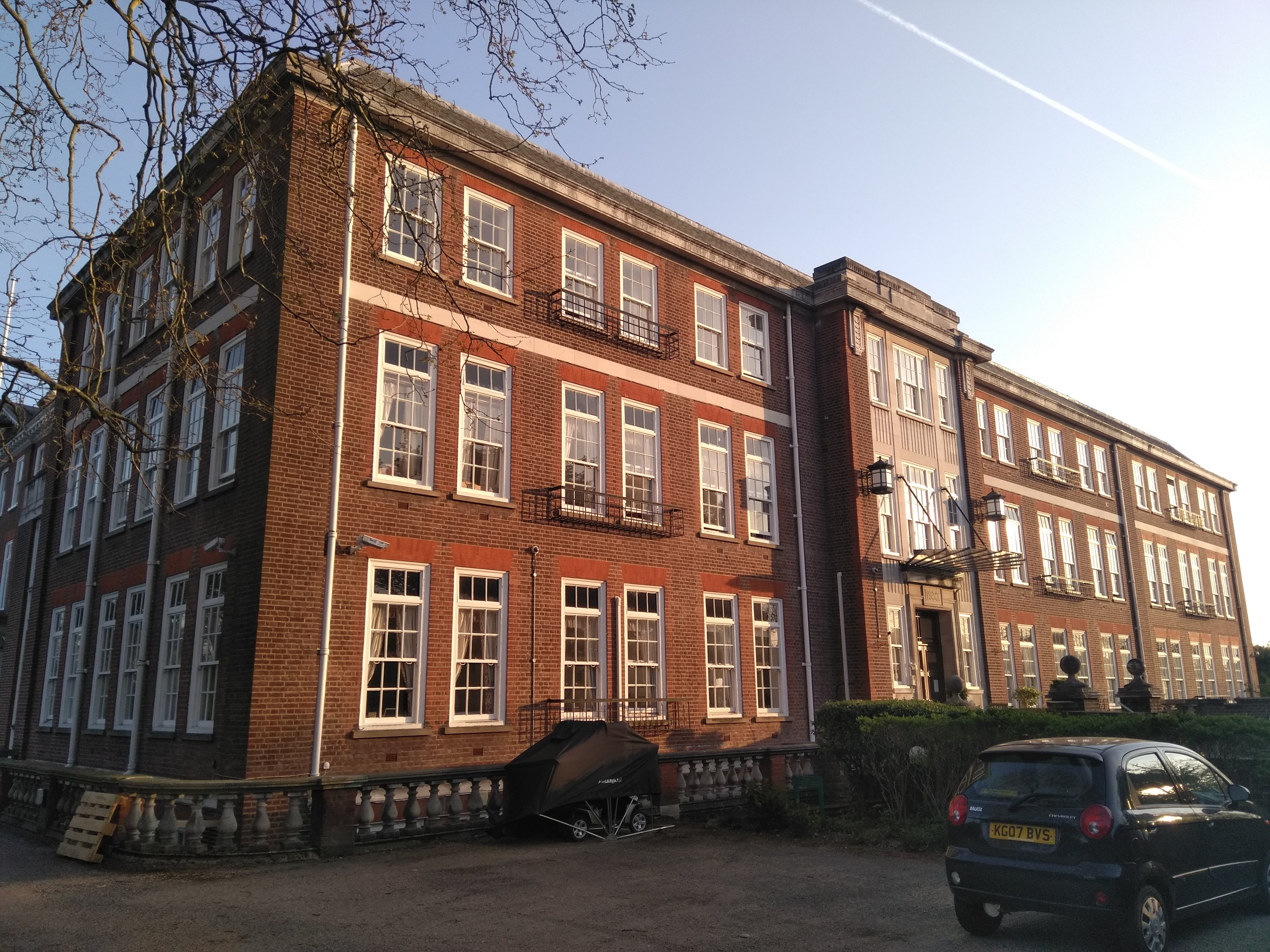
Arnos Grove House, after which the area was named

Arnos Grove was, until the dissolution of the monasteries by Henry VIII, owned by the Nuns of Clerkenwell. It was known as Armholt Wood in the 14th century, and later as Arnolds. A Tudor manor house was erected on the site, but was demolished in 1719 – presumably by James Colebrook, who bought the estate in the same year and built a mansion called Arnolds in Cannon Hill, Southgate. Locals called the estate Arno's and the next owner, Sir William Mayne (later Lord Newhaven), renamed the house and estate Arnos Grove, which is now pronounced as though it never had an apostrophe.

On 19 September 1932 Arnos Grove Underground station was opened, as part of the extension of the London Underground Piccadilly line to Cockfosters. In the years that followed Arnos Grove changed from a rural area to being fully developed – the part of the estate to the north of Arnos Park was, for example, built up by 1939. The main public facilities at Arnos Grove were built in the 1930s. These include Arnos Pool and Bowes Road Library, both of which underwent major refurbishment in the mid-2000s, like Arnos Grove tube station. The library and swimming pool, along with Arnos Park, the extensive facilities at Arnos Grove station (such as Ash House, the seven sidings, and three tracks through the station with four platforms) and the proximity of Arnos Grove to the North Circular, which had been built in 1929, made Arnos Grove a desirable area to live in.

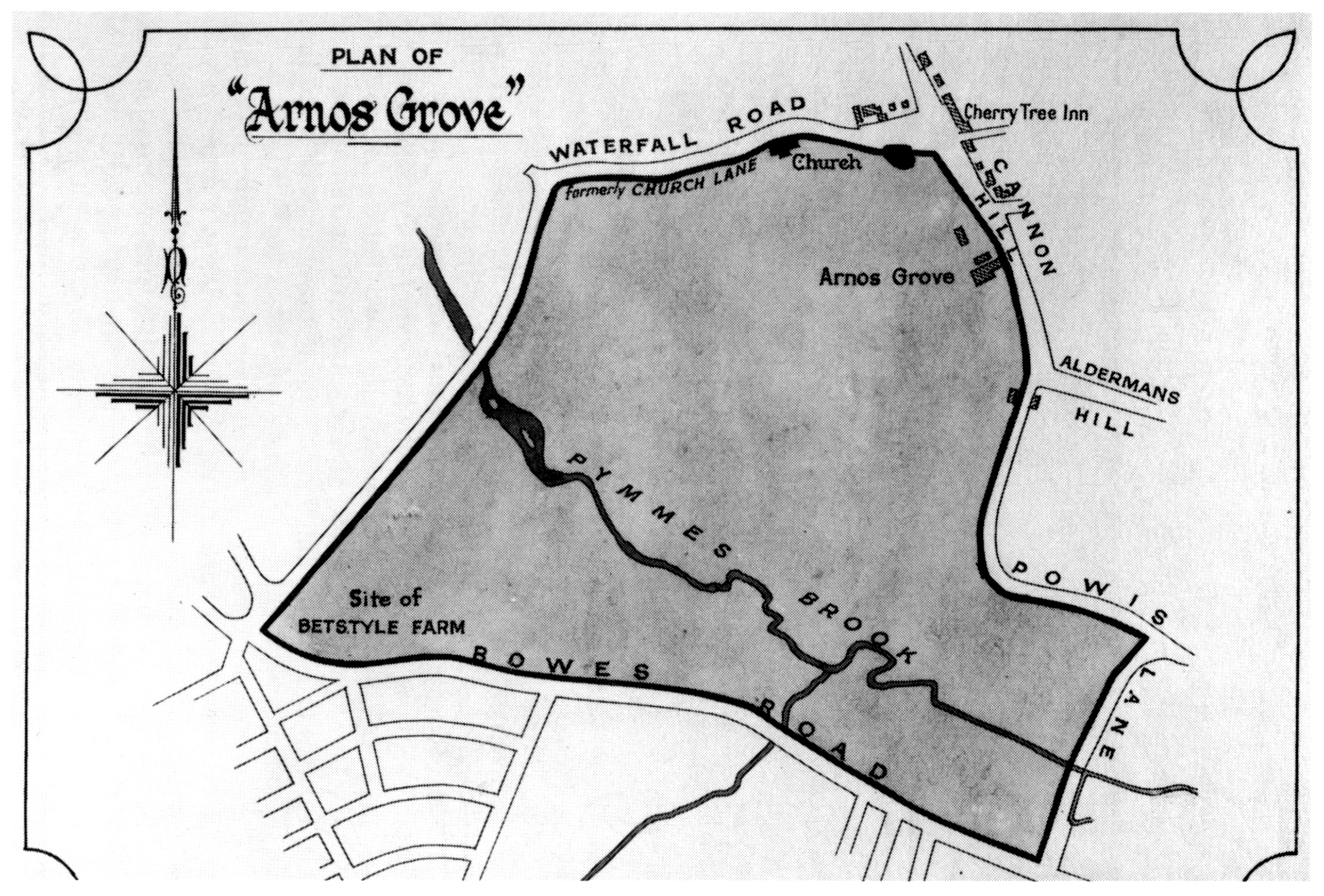
1918 plan of the Arnos Grove area

The southward expansion of Arnos Grove, which was initiated by the bias of facilities to the south of the original estate, was aided by the destruction of parts of New Southgate during World War II. There is now an almost continuous line of shops between Arnos Grove and New Southgate, via Betstyle Circus, making the areas closely linked.

=== Parent districts and administrative areas ===
Until the building of its tube station Arnos Grove was largely undeveloped and rural. As its name suggests it was not a manor, parish or district in its own right. Edmonton which included all parts of Southgate was one of five parishes of Edmonton Hundred, one of five hundreds in Middlesex. The heart of the hundred became the London Borough of Enfield.

As new parishes arose, the area became, in turn, a westerly part of Southgate upgraded from a late medieval chapelry in the mid 19th century, and closely associated with New Southgate later in that century, which is south of Arnos Grove and overlaps. The tube terminus station, Arnos Grove tube station, has cemented its own district status in the popular naming of UK urban places which is rarely rigorously defined. The relatively recent creation of the local Anglican parishes, civil parishes and later changes in early local government body name and electoral wards in this area means Arnos Grove is rarely mentioned with reference to any of its parent areas. In political representation – for electoral purposes – the area has generally been in national and local areas including the rest of Southgate and mentioning the name Southgate.

== Arnos Park ==
One of the main features of Arnos Grove is Arnos Park (44 acres or 18 ha in size). Arnos Park is a remnant of the Arnos Grove estate, and was opened in 1928 after having been purchased by Southgate Council. The Pymmes Brook flows through the park, which contains diverse woodland but is mostly grassy fields. A large brick viaduct, with 34 numbered arches, carries the Piccadilly line beyond Arnos Grove tube station towards Southgate through the western end of the park. The park contains a large playground for children as well as several tennis courts. The Pymmes Brook Trail passes through the park. Also, evidence of the abandoned New River loop can be found within the trees in the north side of the park.

== Places of worship and religion ==
=== Our Lady of Lourdes Parish Church, New Southgate ===
Our Lady of Lourdes is a Roman Catholic Church. The Parish was established in the Diocese of Westminster in 1923, and mass was said in the presbytery until the church was built in 1935. Our Lady of Lourdes Roman Catholic Primary School was built in 1972 on the land owned by the Church to provide an education for the children of the parish.

=== The Parish Church of St. Paul, New Southgate ===
St. Paul's, in Woodland Road, is the Anglican parish church of New Southgate and was consecrated in 1873. The building was designed by Sir George Gilbert Scott in the Early English style. It consists of chancel with north and south chapels and south bell turret and aisled nave. The fabric, which was severely damaged by bombing in 1944, was restored by R. S. Morris by 1957.

== Transport ==
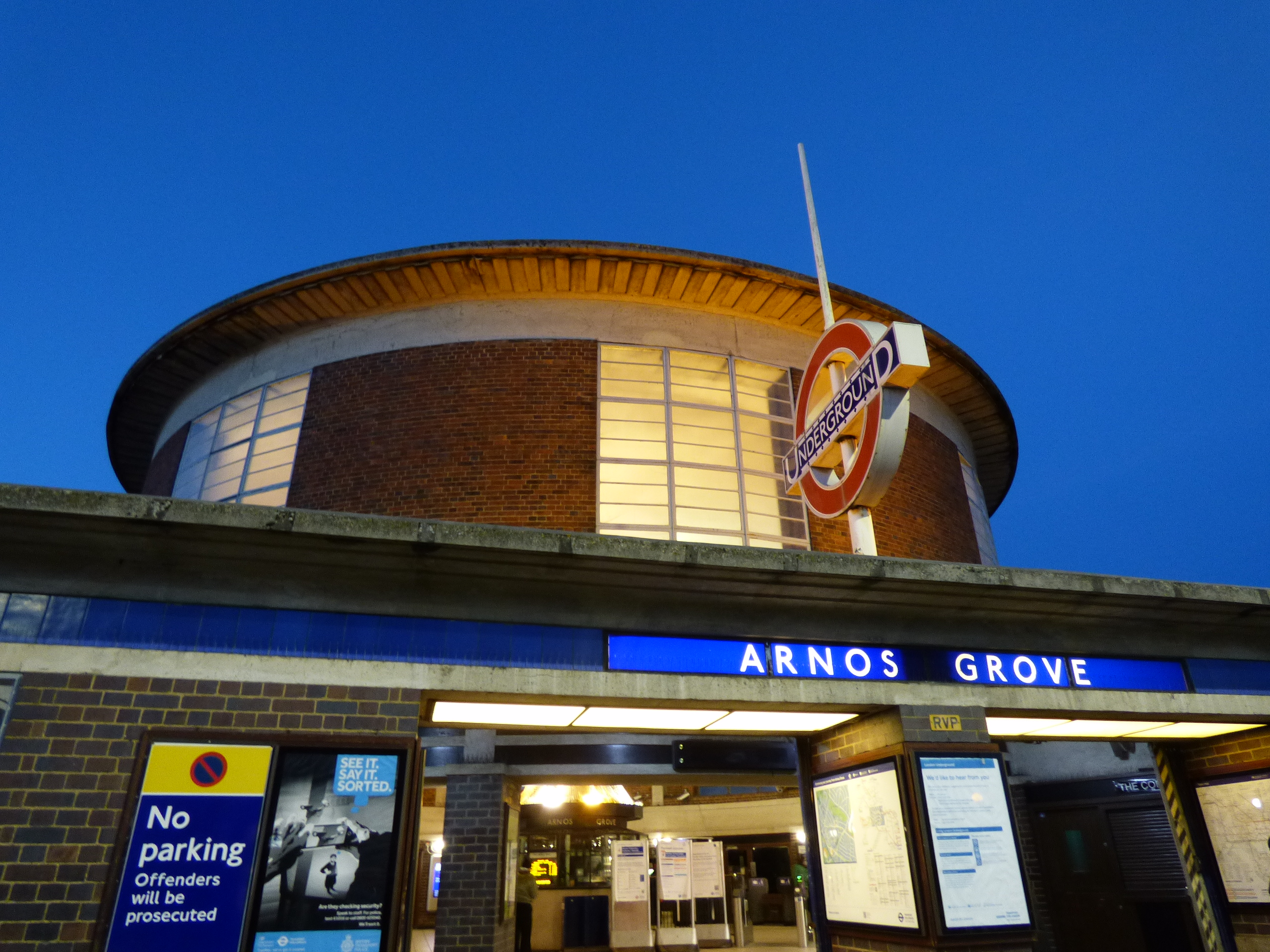
Arnos Grove Station

Arnos Grove is near the A406 road (North Circular) between Palmers Green and Bounds Green. The junction most commonly associated with Arnos Grove is a crossroads between Bowes Road, Wilmer Way and Telford Road. This is one of the few junctions on the A406 that the road does not run straight through or under.

=== Tube ===
Arnos Grove tube station is on the Piccadilly line which passes through Haringey to Heathrow Airport via King's Cross St Pancras tube station and international rail hub. The station building is considered to be a significant example of the work of architect Charles Holden.

=== Buses ===
These buses serve Arnos Grove:

Route	Start	End	Operator
34	Barnet	Walthamstow Central station	Arriva London
184	Barnet	Turnpike Lane station	Go-Ahead London (London General)
232	St Raphael's Estate	Turnpike Lane station	Go-Ahead London (London General)
251	Arnos Grove station	Edgware	Metroline
298	Potters Bar	Arnos Grove station	Uno
382	Millbrook Park	Southgate	Metroline
N91	Trafalgar Square	Cockfosters	Go-Ahead London (London General)
SL1	North Finchley	Walthamstow	Arriva London

=== Bridges ===
- Wilmer Way footbridge

== Schools ==
- St. Paul's Church of England Primary, The Avenue, N11
- laurel (Secondary)
- Our Lady of Lourdes Roman Catholic School (Primary)
- Garfield School (Primary)

== Politics ==
Arnos Grove is part of the Arnos Grove ward for elections to Enfield London Borough Council.
