= Henlys Corner =

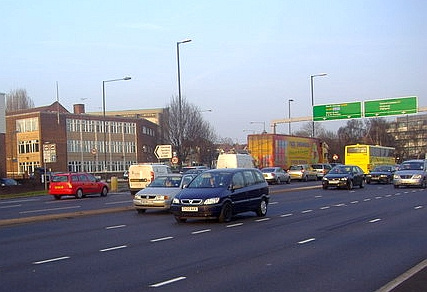
- Henlys Corner, looking east in March 2012

Location
- Finchley, London
- Coordinates: 51°35′23″N 0°12′00″W

Construction
- Type: At grade crossing with traffic signals

Henlys Corner is a brief combining junction of the A1 and the North Circular Road in North London, in the middle of which is the crossroads of the A598.

== Connecting roads and public transport ==
The intersecting local road is Finchley Road/Regent's Park Road. To this are added five, north-side, residential roads. The zone was described by Arriva London in 2011 as a major hotspot for traffic congestion, with approximately 94,000 vehicles traversing the junction daily. The local road leads to Finchley Church End northbound and to Temple Fortune and Golders Green southbound.

Bus 102, which runs from Brent Cross Shopping Centre to Edmonton Green station takes the multi-lane east–west axis. Others crossing the junction are the 13, 112, 232 and 460.

== History ==
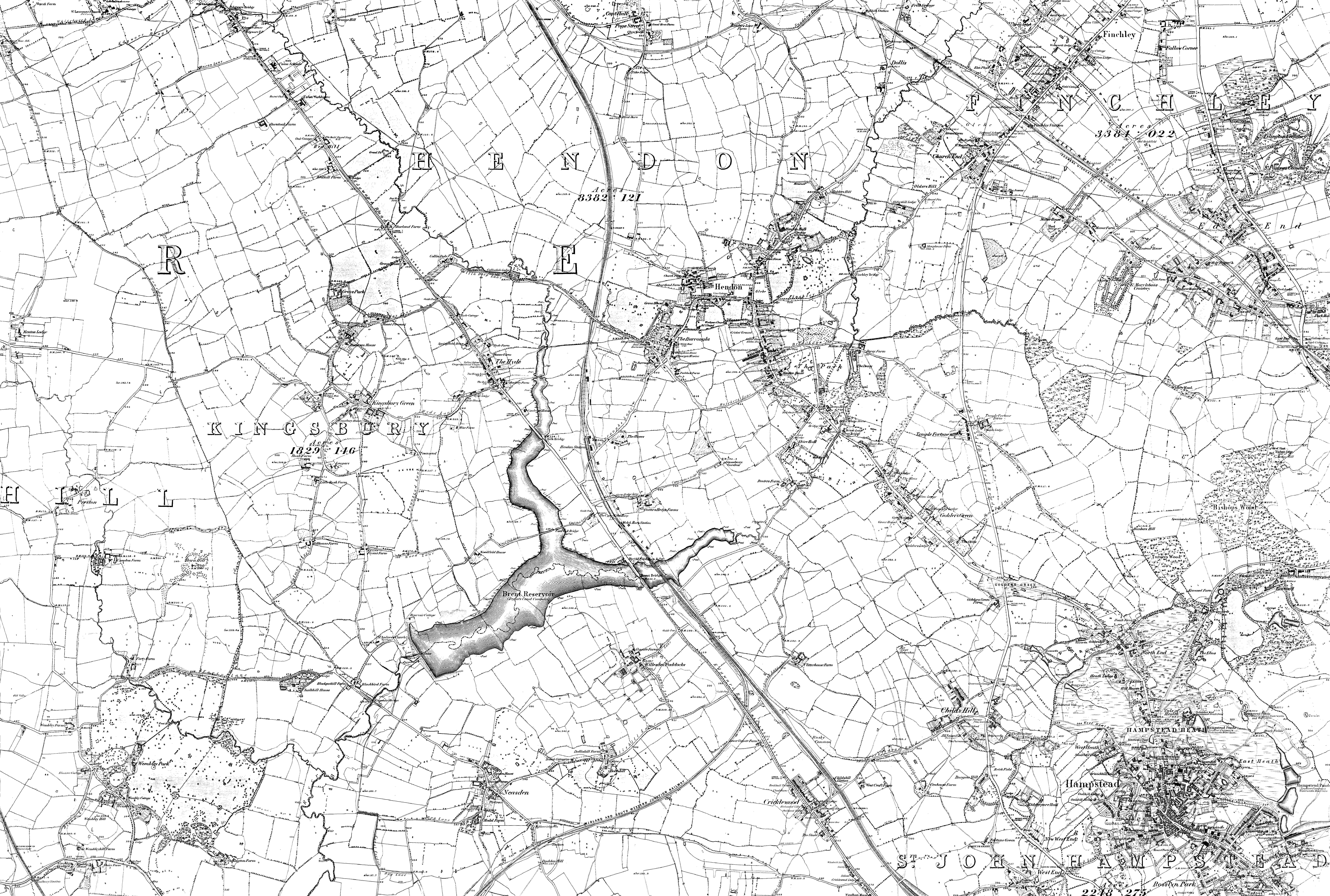
The site in about 1880. Click for broader map and to enable varied magnification.

It is named after the Henlys Group garage and car dealership on the southwest corner of the site from 1935 to 1989.

The junction was created as part of the construction of the Barnet Bypass, which opened in 1928, with future provision for the North Circular. It was designed as a dual carriageway junction, but due to the urban sprawl of London already surrounding it, meant that by the 1950s it had a 30 mph speed limit, traffic lights and pedestrian crossings. In 1967, the junction was widened to three lanes each way, which remains the basic configuration today.

In 2011 the carriageway was widened and upgraded to ease traffic flow. Traffic between from main flow to the local bisectors was allocated central space. The improvements cost over £30 million. On 13 January 2012, the Mayor of London, Boris Johnson officially opened improvements to the junction, stating "This is a tremendous example of how we are improving London’s roads for every type of user." In October, Britain's first hands-free pedestrian crossing was installed at the junction, so that the local Jewish community did not have to use electricity or operate machinery on the Sabbath. Traffic is held every 90 seconds over this duration (sunset Friday to sunset Saturday), with foot traffic principally to and from Kinloss Synagogue.
