= Chiswick Roundabout =

Road junction in London, England

Coordinates: 51.491°N 0.282°W

- Gunnersbury Roundabout

Location
- Chiswick
- Roads at junction: M4; A4; A205; A315; A406

Construction
- Type: Roundabout

Chiswick Roundabout is a major roundabout with a flyover in Chiswick, West London. It was opened in 1959 and is the meeting point of three roads that terminate here, the A205 South Circular, A315 Chiswick High Road, A406 North Circular; and one road which carries on through and interfaces with the M4 – the A4 Great West Road – therefore, it is extremely busy in daytime.

It is one of Britain's first motorway junctions.

The M4 runs on a temporary WNW to ESE axis on the flyover. The roundabout lies in the settled south of Gunnersbury, less than 500 metres (1,600 ft) west of Gunnersbury station.

It is also known as Gunnersbury roundabout.

== Gallery ==
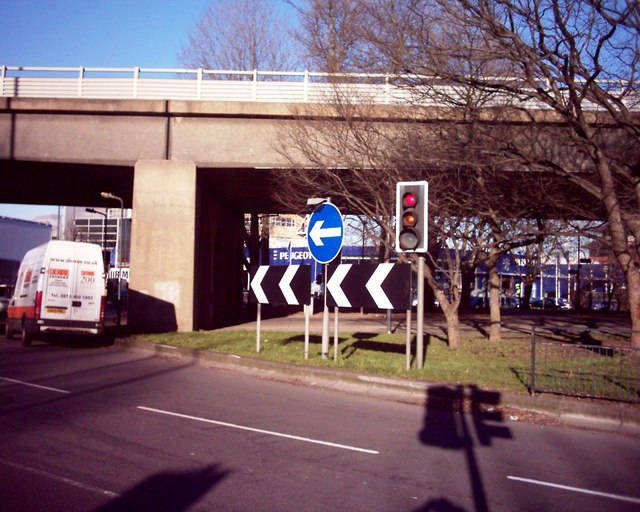
Chiswick Roundabout

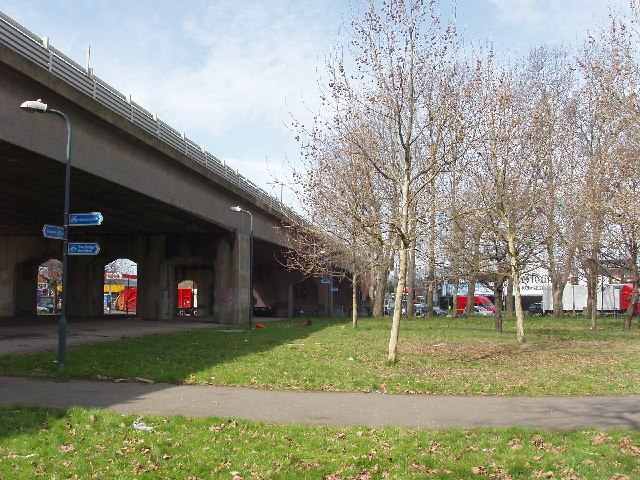
M4 motorway over Chiswick Roundabout
