= Carville Hall (Brentford) =

House and gardens in West London, England

Coordinates: 51°29′26″N 0°17′49″W

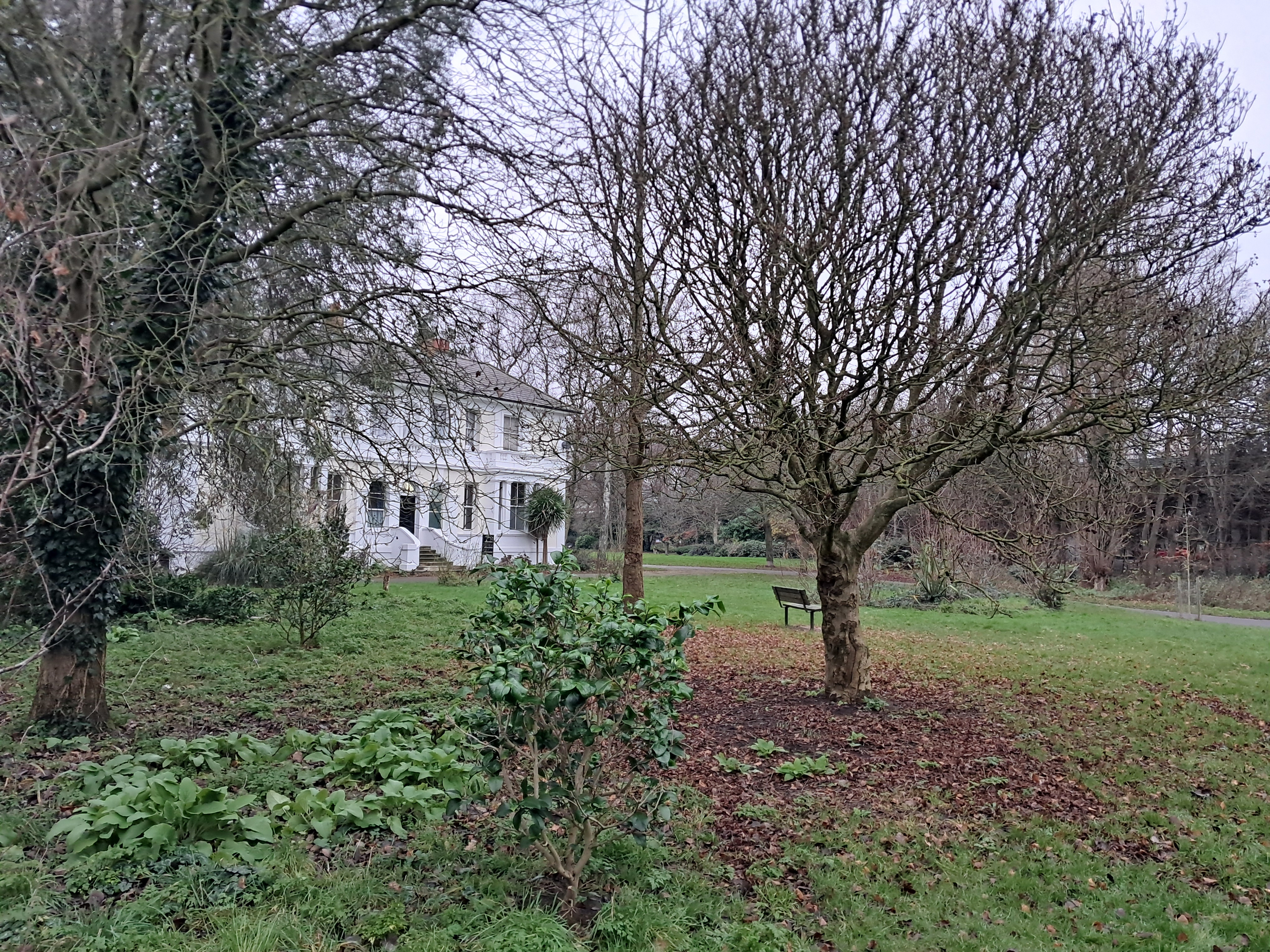
Carville Hall and Carville Hall Park South in December 2024

Carville Hall is a large house and estate in Brentford, West London. Today the grounds, now a public park, are divided into two by the elevated section of the M4 motorway.

There are records of the house from 1777, when it was owned by the wealthy distiller and brewer David Roberts (c1733-97). It was extended and re-fronted in the Victorian era, when it was known as Clayponds. From the late 1800s Carville Hall was the home of coal and horse racing magnate William Lancalot Redhead (c1853-1909) and his daughter the philanthropist Margaret Hunnam Redhead (1897-1991), who later married Esmond Harmsworth, 2nd Viscount Rothermere. Before the war ownership of the house had passed to Thomas William Crowther.

In 1918 the property and grounds were acquired by Middlesex County Council to make room for the building of the Great West Road. Brentford Urban District Council acquired the park as a War Memorial and open public space in an otherwise dense area of industrial buildings and housing. In 1959 the grounds were further divided by the building of the Chiswick Flyover above the Great West Road, now the start of the M4 Motorway.

By the 1950s the house had been converted into flats, but later fell into disrepair. Carville Hall Park South retains a flavour of the original gardens. Carville Hall Park North has open grasslands used for playing fields, a pavilion and a children's playground.
