= Charlie Brown's Roundabout =

Road junction in London, England

Coordinates: 51.5938°N 0.037°E

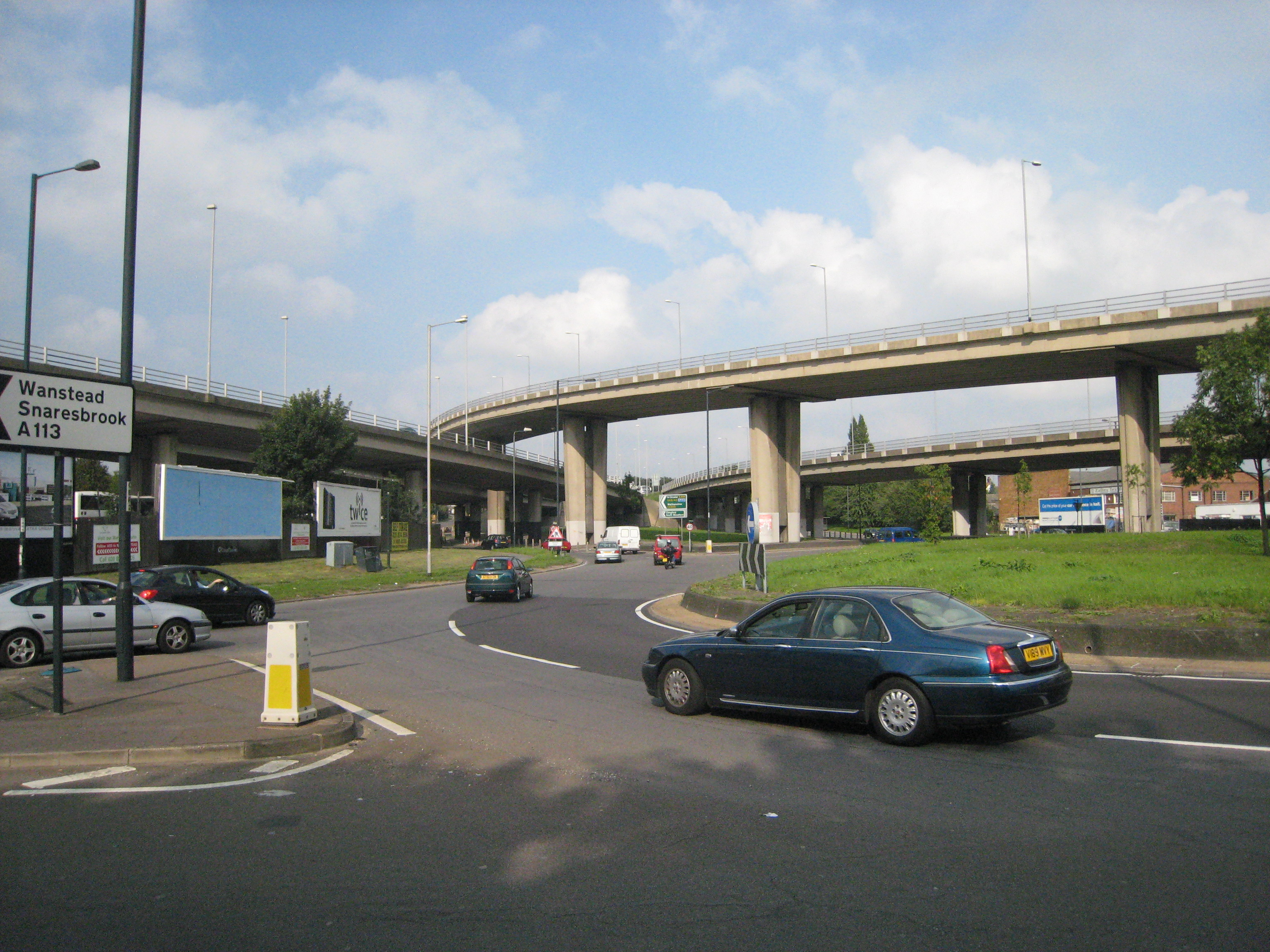
Ground level Charlie Brown's Roundabout and the Woodford Roundabout Viaduct above

Charlie Brown's Roundabout is the official name of a large ground level roundabout in South Woodford for local arterial roads, and is also used as an unofficial local landmark name for the Woodford Roundabout Viaduct – the flyover above the roundabout giving access to the M11 motorway. It is named for a pub that stood adjacent to a smaller roundabout at the location until being demolished, in 1972, to allow expanded interchanges and access to the M11.

== Layout and unconnected flyovers ==
Southwest is the nearby settlement, South Woodford, part of London since 1965. The Roding, a traditional boundary, is east of the roundabout.

The roundabout is for a restricted access North Circular junction, east of its course, with lesser roads: Southend Road and Chigwell Road: to north, east and south. Overhead are flyovers of the west-facing (North London), as opposed to south-facing (East London) southern end of the M11 motorway. The flyovers and the western approach to the roundabout access solely the North London aspects of the North Circular, which changes axis – to run south – west of the roundabout.

The nascent M11 and the North Circular merge at the next interchange south, the Redbridge Roundabout, (or, specifically, via a long spur north of that, for access to the northbound M11) that is the point of local interface with the North Circular's East London axis.

== History ==
=== Toponymy ===
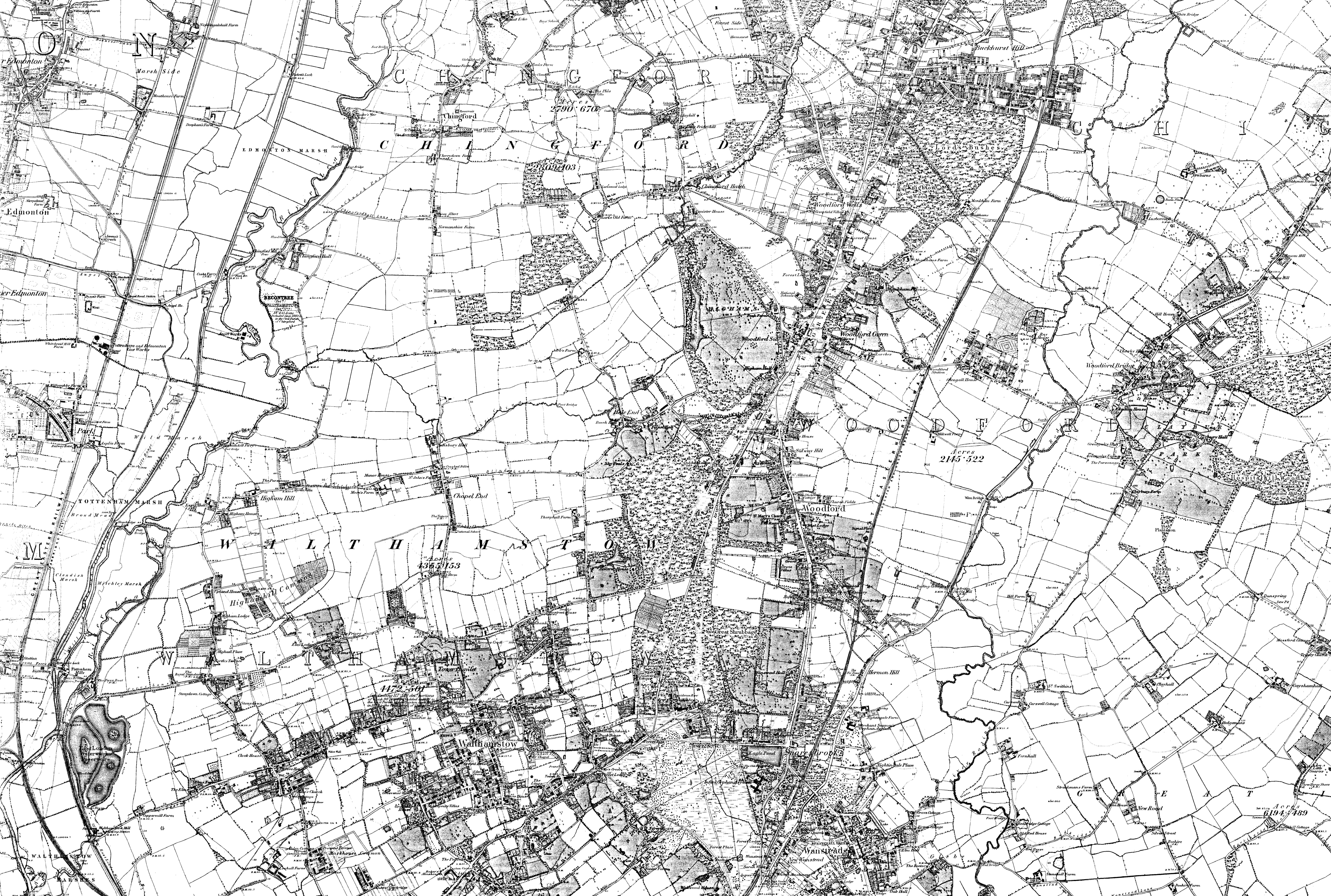
The site in about 1880.

The roundabout is named after the landlord of the 20th century-founded pub, The Roundabout, that was demolished in 1972 when the roundabout was enlarged to allow sliproads for the new motorway. The landlord's father, also Charlie Brown (1859–1932), was the landlord of the Railway Tavern, locally known as Charlie Brown's, in the Limehouse section of the London Docklands, a few miles south. The Railway Tavern was taken over by the younger Charlie's sister, while he operated the rival Blue Posts, directly opposite the Railway; both pubs erected signage calling themselves Charlie Brown's Pub. In 1938, Charlie Brown left the Blue Posts to take on The Roundabout, in Woodford.

=== Formation of a junction ===
One road here pre-dates the early 20th century, Chigwell Road. Today's roundabout replaces a section of that road, part of the old course of the river, and small parts of three fields. Its southwest sits on the site of Roding Cottage which included a commercial rose nursery in its 6 acres (2.4 ha).
