= Hanger Lane gyratory =

Large roundabout system in west London

Coordinates: 51°31′49″N 0°17′35″W

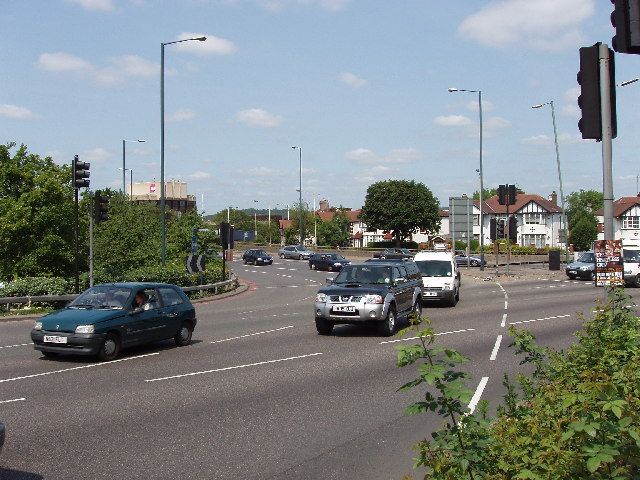
The northern side of the junction

The Hanger Lane gyratory is a multi-lane rectangular gyratory – having the Hanger Lane underpass, under its southern limb, for the Western Avenue (A40). It enables intersection with the North Circular (A406) and the inceptive Ealing Road towards Wembley. It is in the north of the borough of Ealing in west London.

== Scope and interior ==
It covers about 30,000 square metres (320,000 sq ft). At rush hour it carries nearly 10,000 vehicles per hour. An above-ground section of the London Underground Central line passes under the structure which takes the form of a rounded-corner rectangular roundabout. The south-east corner of its interior hosts Hanger Lane tube station accessed by paths beneath; the rest hosts small utility buildings and a nature reserve which has many mature, deciduous trees – a Site of Importance for Nature Conservation.

== History ==
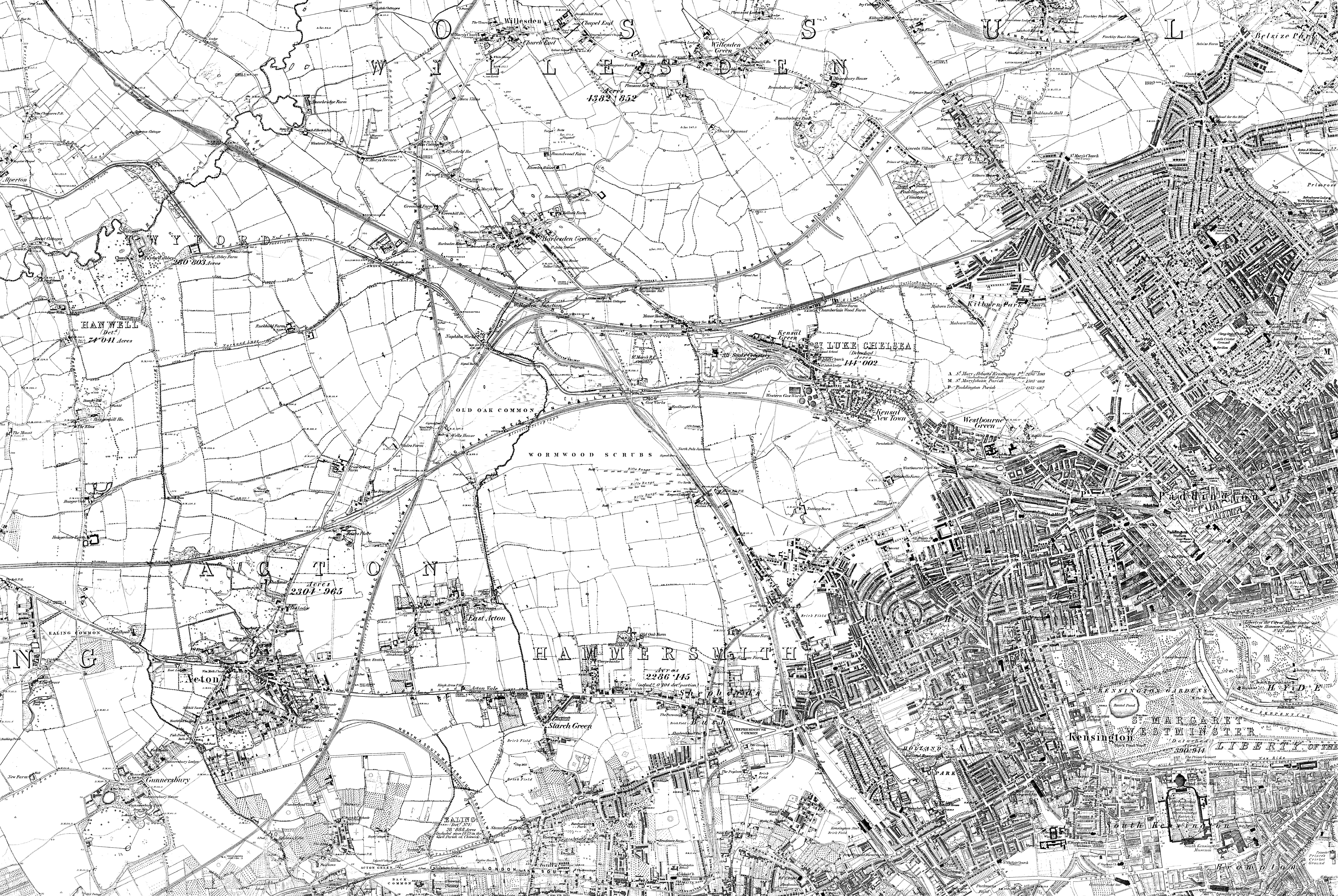
The site as a three-way rural junction in about 1880. The pariochial detached part of Hanwell, a strip of eastern land, measured 74 acres.

In the 1960s, a 240 metres (260 yd) long tunnel was built to take the A40 road underneath the Hanger Lane junction. The junction became a gyratory in the early 1980s when the western side of the loop was built. In December 2007 it was named Britain's scariest junction.

Before its tunnelling cost was approved, the High Speed 2 railway was to cause a remodelling of the gyratory, but in April 2013 it was decided to put this section of HS2 in a bored tunnel instead due to the cost of rebuilding the gyratory system.

== Construction ==
The first underpass was built from June 1958 by AE Farr of Westbury, Wiltshire, costing £761,000. It was designed by Rendall, Palmer and Tritton.

The eastbound carriageway opened on Thursday September 1 1960. It was the second underpass built in the country, after one on the A3 in north Surrey

The gyratory was planned from 1973. Work started on the gyratory in October 1978, costing £3m. It was 12.25 acres, with consulting engineers Husband & Co.

It fully opened on April 6 1981.
