= South Woodford =

Suburb of London, England

Coordinates: 51.593453°N 0.025717°E

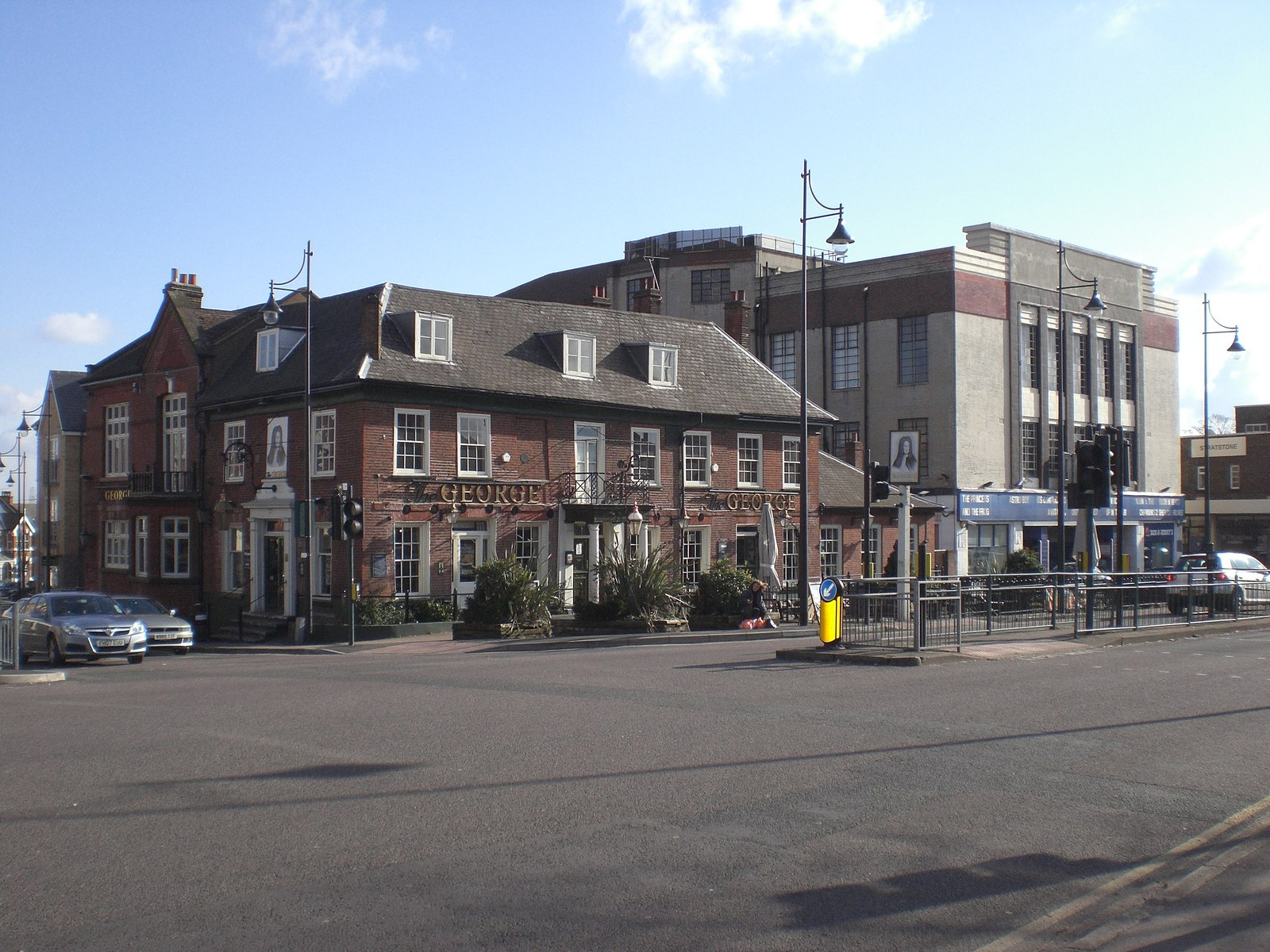
- The George Pub and Odeon Cinema

- Location within Greater London
- OS grid reference: TQ405905
  - Charing Cross: 8.9 mi (14.3 km) SW
- London borough: Redbridge
- Ceremonial county: Greater London
- Region: London
- Country: England
- Sovereign state: United Kingdom
- Post town: LONDON
- Postcode district: E18
- Dialling code: 020
- Police: Metropolitan
- Fire: London
- Ambulance: London
- UK Parliament: Chingford and Woodford Green; Ilford North; Leyton and Wanstead
- London Assembly: Havering and Redbridge

South Woodford is an area of east London, England, within the London Borough of Redbridge. It adjoins Woodford Green to the north, Walthamstow to the west, Snaresbrook and Wanstead to the south and Redbridge to the east, and is 8.9 miles (14.3 km) north-east of Charing Cross. Epping Forest runs adjacent to South Woodford in the west of the area.

== History ==
Historically part of the ancient parish of Woodford St Mary, in the Becontree hundred of Essex, the area was largely rural before developing rapidly in the 19th century. It became part of the Metropolitan Police District in 1840 and has been part of the London postal district since its inception in 1856, the same year that South Woodford station, now on the Central line of the London Underground, opened. South Woodford formed part of Woodford Urban District from 1894 to 1934, then part of the Wanstead and Woodford until 1965, when Greater London was created.

This area was until 2004 home to the student residences of Queen Mary, University of London, but the distinctive tower blocks were demolished in 2007 and replaced with privately owned apartments, as well as some council housing, known as Queen Mary's Gate.

== Amenities ==
South Woodford's retail and business area is centred on George Lane, the location of South Woodford tube station and Woodford Green High Road. There are several leading chain stores, such as Sainsbury's, Marks & Spencer, Waitrose and Boots and a number of smaller shops, bars, restaurants and cafes. British bakery Gail's has a branch on George Lane.

There is a seven screen Odeon cinema, which opened in 1934 as a Majestic and is the only cinema in the area. Next door, The George pub, an 18th-century building on the site of an earlier inn, was originally a stopping point for stagecoaches, with several bars. The George once had a fine dining area on the first floor and then later a pizzeria in the basement, with a large spiral staircase between the floors. Other local amenities include a number of green areas, many of which form part of Epping Forest.

There are numerous churches and chapels representing various Christian denominations, several synagogues and a mosque.

The Redbridge Drama Centre, situated next to Churchfields Junior School, provides workshops for young children aged 5 and above and adults up until 65, drama education to local schools and culture to the surrounding area. It has an in-house theatre company named Vital Stages. There are shows at least once a week from touring companies.

South Woodford lies within the London Borough of Redbridge, covering the wards of Churchfields and South Woodford. Each ward has a team of Neighbourhood Police, each managed by one sergeant.

== Transport ==
=== Road ===
South Woodford sits at the junction of the North Circular Road with the start of the M11 motorway, which begins at Charlie Brown's Roundabout and is accessible from the Waterworks Corner roundabout. Charlie Brown's Roundabout was enlarged in 1972 to accommodate the flyover and sliproads onto the newly constructed motorway.

South Woodford also offers easy access to the A1400, which merges into the A12, as well as access to the A12 from the Green Man roundabout and the A104 which is known as Lea Bridge Road and is a major link to areas of central London via Hackney.

=== Train ===
George Lane itself is split into two by the Central line rail track with the western part of the road containing the majority of shops and businesses. There was originally a level crossing at this point, but now a flyover (locally referred to as "the Viaduct") carries traffic between the east and west sides of George Lane.

The area is served by South Woodford tube station in London fare zone 4 on the Central line of the London Underground.

=== Bus ===
South Woodford is served by London Buses routes 20, 123, 179, SL2, W12, W13, W14 and N55.

== Education ==
South Woodford has a good selection of schools including Nightingale Primary, Snaresbrook Primary, Churchfields and Oakdale which are both split into infants and juniors. There is also Snaresbrook Preparatory and Woodbridge Secondary School.

Forest School is an independent school, in close proximity to South Woodford, in that the playing fields are arguably in South Woodford.
