= North Circular Road =

Ring road around Central London

Coordinates: 51.6161°N 0.0952°W

A406
- North Circular Road
- The North Circular Road in Greater London, with the South Circular Road and Woolwich Ferry. A406 road Other A roads to Woolwich Ferry

Route information
- Maintained by Transport for London
- Length: 25.7 mi (41.4 km)
- History: Opened: 1910; Completed: c. 1930

Major junctions
- West end: Chiswick (M4 Junction 1)
- A205 (South Circular Road); M4; A4 (Great West Road); A40 (Western Avenue); M1; A1 (Great North Way); A10 (Great Cambridge Road); M11; A12 (Eastern Avenue); A13 (East Ham and Barking Bypass); Woolwich Ferry via the A1020
- East end: North Woolwich

Location
- Country: United Kingdom

Road network
- Roads in the United Kingdom; Motorways; A and B road zones

The North Circular Road (officially the A406), is a 25.7-mile-long (41.4 km) ring road around the northern half of inner London. Although it is now a single continuous road, it was formed from component sections, some of which are named North Circular Road while others retain their separate names, e.g. Gunnersbury Avenue, Hanger Lane. The term "North Circular" is used as a more accurate synonym for A406, including for route planning purposes. The road runs from Chiswick in the west to North Woolwich in the east via suburban north London, connecting various suburbs and other trunk roads in the region.

Together with its counterpart, the South Circular Road, it mostly forms a ring road around inner London, except for crossing of the River Thames to the east, which is done by the Woolwich Ferry.

The road's route was established in 1911 and it was constructed in the Interwar period, connecting local industrial communities and bypassing London. It was upgraded after World War II, and was at one point planned to become a motorway as part of the controversial and ultimately cancelled London Ringways scheme. In the early 1990s, the road was extended to bypass Barking and meet the A13 north of Woolwich, though without a direct link to the ferry.

The road's design varies from six-lane dual carriageway to urban streets; the latter, although short, cause traffic congestion in London and are regularly featured on local traffic reports, particularly at Bounds Green. The uncertainty of development has caused urban decay and property blight along its route, and led to criticism over its poor pollution record. Several London Borough Councils have set up regeneration projects to improve the environment for communities close to the road.

== Route ==
The North Circular Road forms the northern part of a ring-road around Central London. The route identified for it in 1911 lay substantially through green fields (unlike that for the South Circular Road), and consequently much of it is on purpose-built roads rather than urban streets. Some sections of the latter have been upgraded, often involving the demolition of houses and urban infrastructure.

The route is mostly grade-separated dual carriageway from the A40 at Hanger Lane to the A13 in Beckton except for the Drury Way/Brentfield Road junction, the Golders Green Road/Brent Street junction, Henlys Corner and the section from Bounds Green to Green Lanes. Sections of road which existed before they were incorporated into the North Circular are most likely to have retained their original names, e.g. Gunnersbury Avenue, Bowes Road.

=== Gunnersbury, Hanger Lane and Brent Cross ===
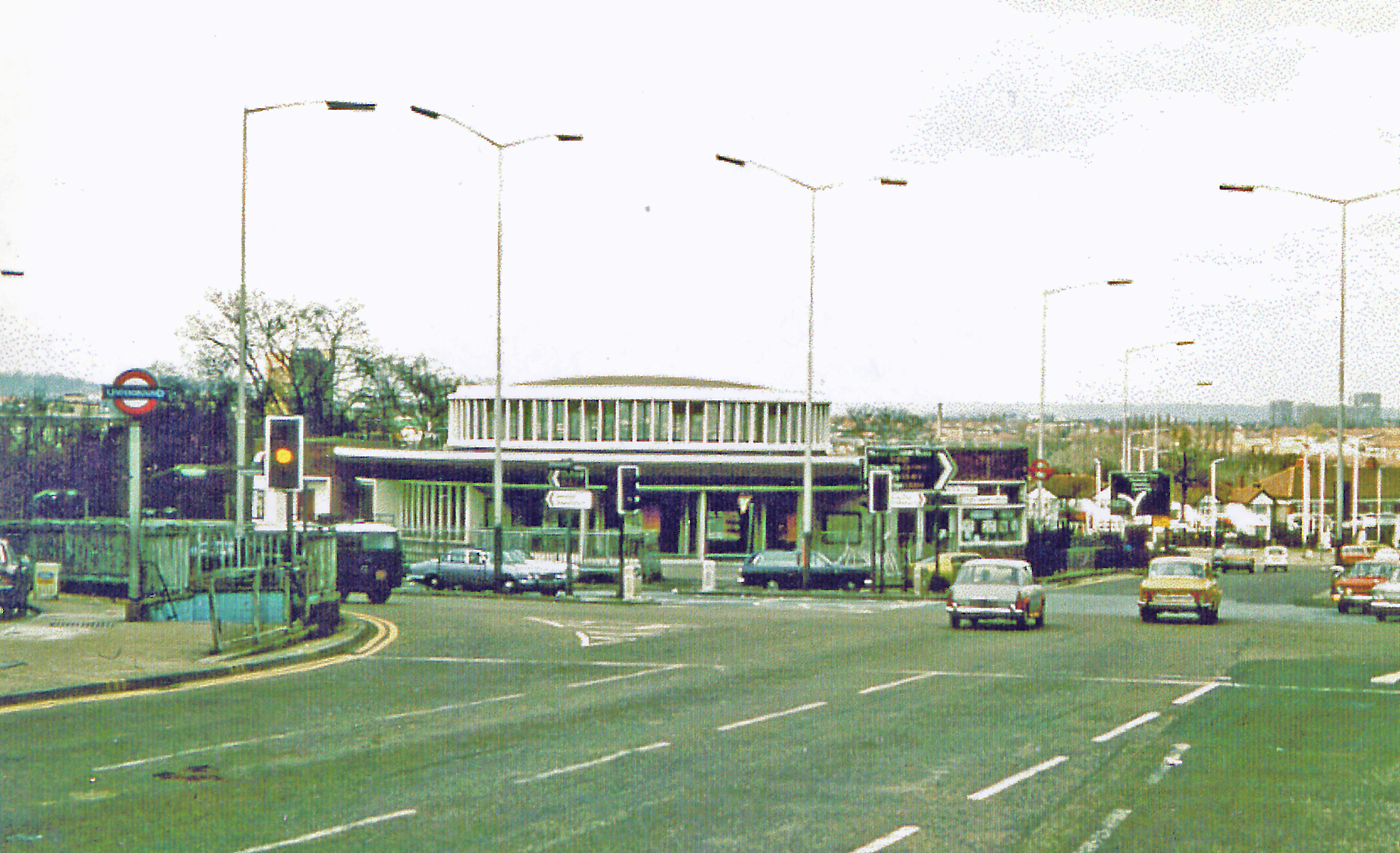
The Hanger Lane gyratory on the North Circular is one of the most congested junctions in London, carrying over 10,000 vehicles per hour.

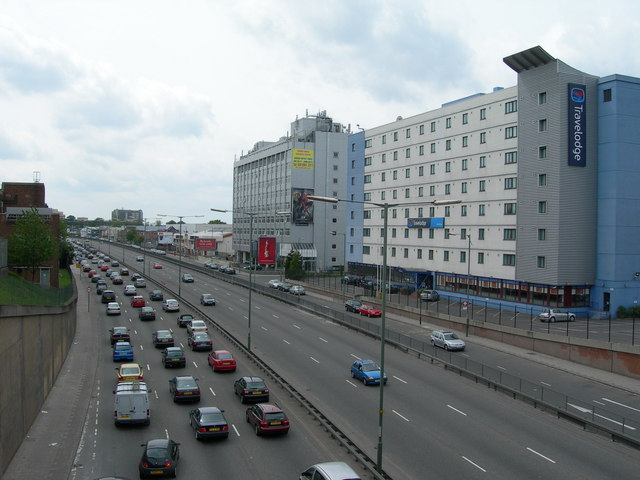
Six-lane dual carriageway to the north of Hanger Lane gyratory, with an additional two-lane road west of it providing access to an industrial estate, superstores and other commercial premises

The road begins in Gunnersbury at the Chiswick flyover (junction 1 of the M4), from which the South Circular Road (A205) heads south over Kew Bridge, and the A4 heads east towards Chiswick and west towards Brentford. The first section runs along Gunnersbury Avenue through Gunnersbury Park to Ealing Common, with a mix of single and dual carriageways, where it becomes Hanger Lane.

The road crosses the Great Western Main Line west of Paddington to the Hanger Lane gyratory system, a large roundabout on top of the Western Avenue (the A40) with Hanger Lane tube station. This is one of the busiest junctions in London, used by 10,000 vehicles an hour.

From Hanger Lane the A406 was built as the North Circular Road. Originally it was a single carriageway but with space for frontage roads, except beneath the West Coast Main Line near Stonebridge Park. The road has been widened repeatedly (including beneath the West Coast Main Line) and is now a six-lane dual carriageway that connects the industrial estates in the area. Beyond Stonebridge Park, there is a junction with IKEA and the Neasden temple to the southeast, and the road runs alongside open land south of the Welsh Harp Reservoir.

Beyond the reservoir, there is a large interchange with the Edgware Road (A5) and junction 1 of the M1 motorway at Staples Corner, and a junction for the Brent Cross Shopping Centre at the Brent Cross Interchange (joining the A41 from Finchley). This section of the North Circular was used for filming the car chasing sequences in Withnail and I.

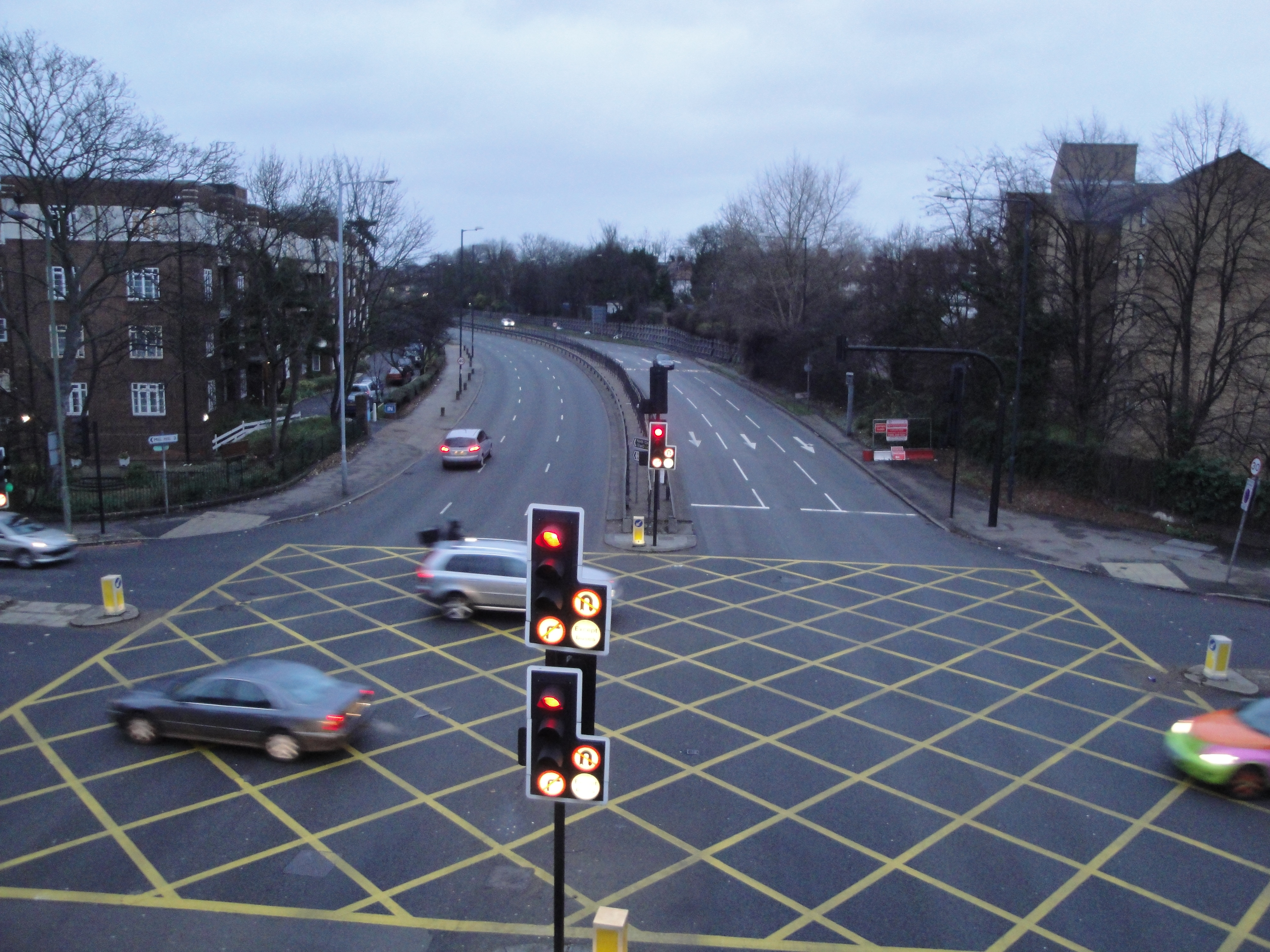
Intersection of Brent Street and Golders Green Road, viewed from a footbridge in Hendon

Northeast of Brent Cross, at Henlys Corner, the North Circular briefly shares carriageways with the A1, which joins it from the northwest and leaves it to the southeast to head into Central London. The junction complex also serves the Finchley Road and pedestrian traffic, and consequently is a major bottleneck on the route.

Transport for London have invested in the junction, including a special hands-free traffic-light-controlled pedestrian crossing which allows members of the local Jewish community to cross the road safely on the Sabbath. The road passes north of St Pancras and Islington Cemetery towards Friern Barnet and Muswell Hill. The road narrows to four lanes to pass under the East Coast Main Line, and continues with four lanes as single-carriageway Telford Road towards Bounds Green.

=== Southgate, Woodford and Beckton ===
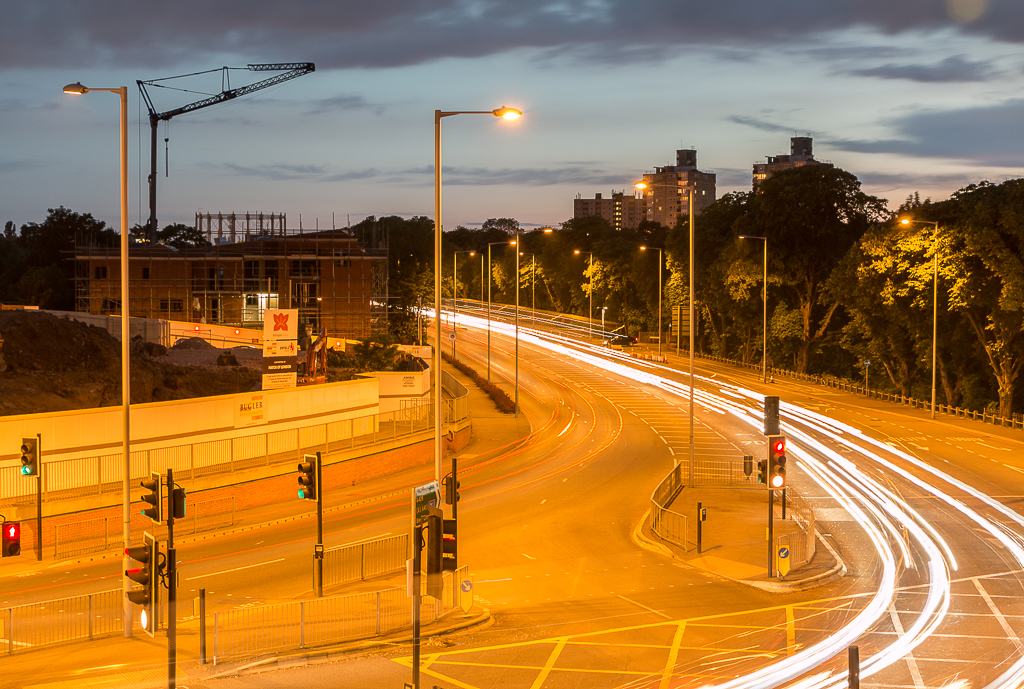
In Bounds Green, the North Circular Road is reduced to single carriageway with a 90 degree turn at traffic lights, and it is one of the most congested roads in London.

Traffic on the North Circular must turn right from Telford Road into Bowes Road at a traffic-light-controlled junction, which causes traffic to back-up. The road continues past densely packed housing and business areas before widening at Green Lanes and assuming the North Circular Road name again. (Note: Here, as in many places, the use of "North Circular Road" as the street name indicates that this was a new section of road built on undeveloped land in the 1920s. To the east of Great Cambridge Road, the route used Silver Street, which remains. Its dual-carriageway replacement was named "Sterling Way".) At Great Cambridge Interchange, its most northerly point, the A406 crosses Great Cambridge Road (A10). To the east of here the road has been reconstructed as a dual carriageway but the earlier name Angel Road is used past the site of the former Angel Road railway station, which lay beside Pymmes Brook. Angel Road is also used as the name of part of the elevated road which replaced the single-carriageway reinforced-concrete Lea Valley Viaduct of 1924-26 across the flood plain of the River Lea.

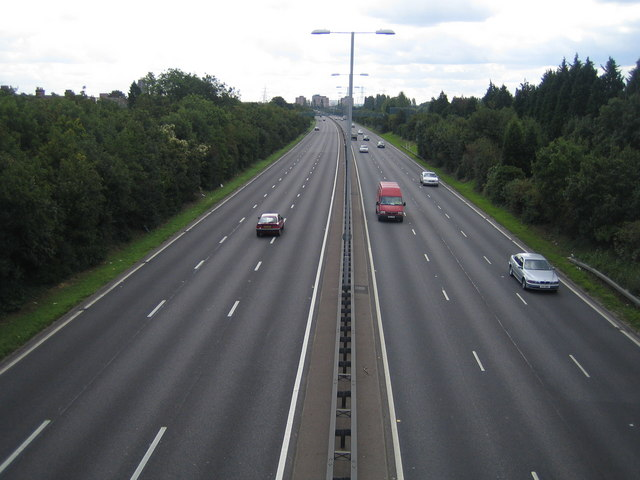
The North Circular Road (South Woodford to Barking Relief Road) near Ilford

After the viaduct the road passes north of Walthamstow and, immediately before the Crooked Billet junction, the former site of Walthamstow Stadium. It continues eastward, cutting through a southern section of Epping Forest and meeting the Woodford New Road at Waterworks Corner, before an elevated junction with the M11 motorway and Southend Road heading to Gants Hill. The South Woodford to Barking Relief Road (the section between the M11 and A13) opened in 1987. Previously, the A406 (but not the North Circular) extended along Southend Road and Woodford Avenue as far east as Gants Hill. The current route of the North Circular Road turns south, passing Eastern Avenue (A12) on a flyover at the Redbridge roundabout. It passes Romford Road (the historic Roman Road from London to Colchester) to the west of Ilford and London Road, Barking, and ends at a roundabout with the A13 Newham Way/Alfred's Way in Beckton.

To reach the Woolwich Ferry, traffic must follow local roads to the ferry terminal – the A1020 Royal Docks Road, and the A117 named successively as Woolwich Manor Way, Albert Road and Pier Road. The Woolwich Ferry leads across the River Thames, connecting with the eastern end of the South Circular Road on the other side of the river. The junction with the A13 has been built to enable the North Circular to be continued across the junction to the Thames Gateway Bridge if and when it is built.

== History ==
=== Early history ===
William Rees Jeffreys' Proposal for "A Boulevard round London", 1904 (full plan and key here)

In 1904 in his submission to the Royal Commission on London Traffic, William Rees Jeffreys proposed "A Boulevard round London", arguing that

a road round London is perhaps the most urgently required of all the new roads. At present the traffic wishing to get from one side of London to the other has to pass through the congested central portions. The route sketched in the map would enable travellers to get from one side of London to the other without passing through it.

North and South Circular Road proposals by London Traffic Branch, 1910

Map showing details of 1911 route of North and South Circular Roads against existing development

The Royal Commission did not adopt this proposal, but it was picked up by the London Traffic Branch of the Board of Trade. This was established to co-ordinate the activities of the various local authorities responsible for roads in their areas. Its 1910 Report put forward a proposal, which was revised in 1911 and which essentially set out the route which was subsequently implemented. The 1911 Report explained:

Further consideration having shown the impossibility of satisfactorily widening and improving the whole length of Forest Road at Walthamstow, and other parts through Tottenham and Hornsey, a new line is now suggested for the proposed North Circular Road, some two miles further north, passing through Friern Barnet and Edmonton.

Both schemes were based on existing roads, which were to be improved and connected together by new sections into a circumferential road. Although central Government was promoting the scheme and could offer grants, control of the roads was split between county councils (e.g. Middlesex) and districts (e.g. Finchley). New roads could not be imposed, only negotiated. As the main aim was to ameliorate congestion, lightly-trafficked roads in the outer suburbs were accepted as part of the route.

From 1913 local authorities and other interested parties held a series of Arterial Road Conferences. Their remit was broader than the Royal Commission's had been and they proposed roads extending from Uxbridge to Southend-on-Sea. In 1916 the second full Arterial Road Conference approved the London Traffic Branch's 1911 plans for London with minor additions.

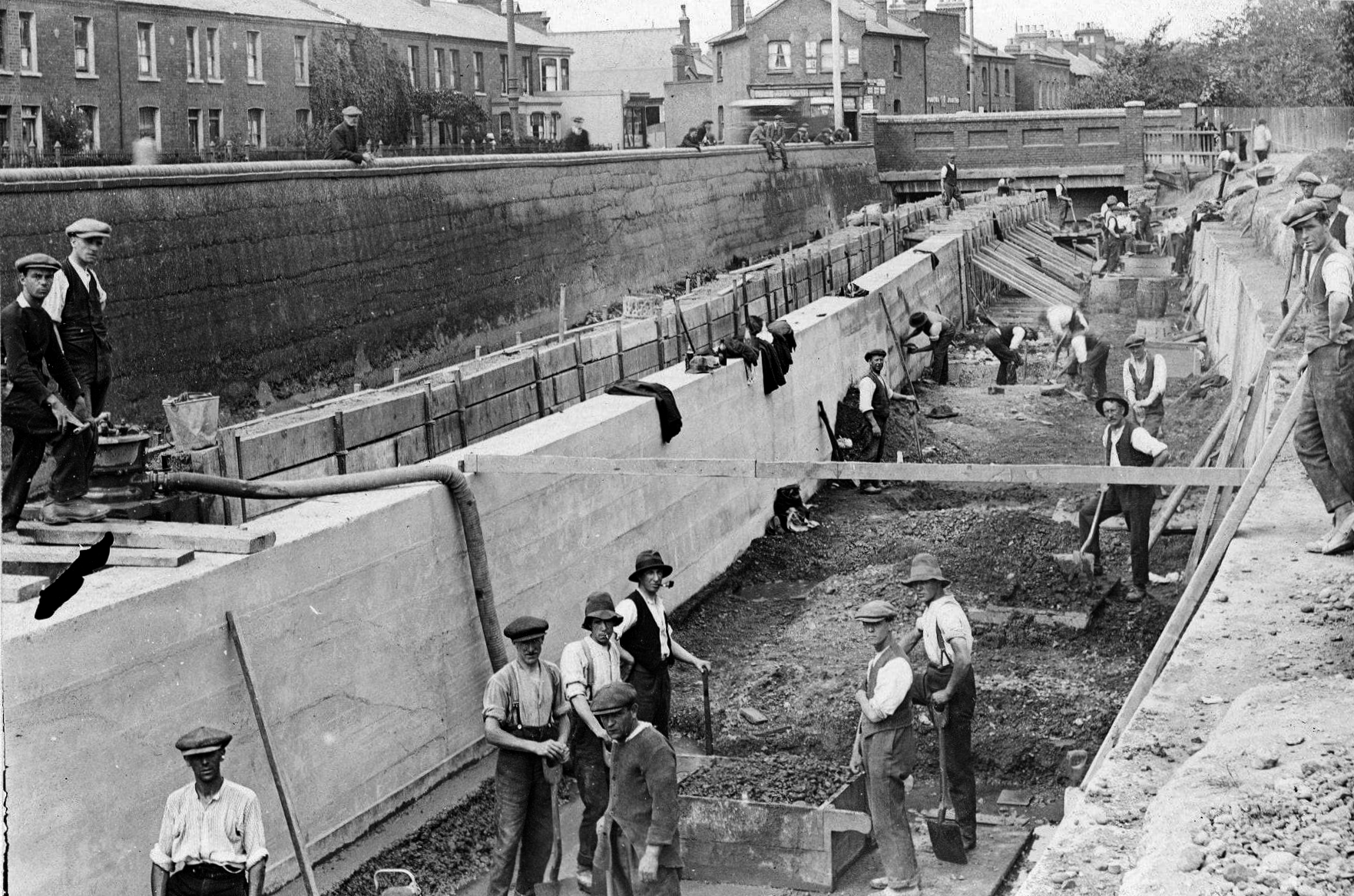
Culverting of Pymmes Brook as part of the construction of North Circular Road, 1921 (Note: The photograph is looking west from a point south of Glasgow Road towards the bridge carrying Edinburgh Road across Pymmes Brook; see https://maps.nls.uk/view/103657610)

Construction of the North Circular Road started in 1921 as an unemployment relief scheme with the Government providing funding to local authorities. The first lengths of road to be built were those where work could start rapidly: on undeveloped land which could be acquired compulsorily at low cost, notably between Harrow Road and the future Henly's Corner.

1929 map of North Circular Road showing new road (black) and existing (red)

Various manufacturing industries, including furniture production, had moved away from the East End in the early 20th century to areas on the fringes of London including Tottenham and Edmonton, which were growing rapidly. The 1911 route was no longer undeveloped and a new route was adopted using Angel Road, which was widened by culverting and building over the adjacent Pymmes Brook. (Note: At its east end, the local highway authority had in 1908 built a 17-span reinforced concrete overbridge past Angel Road station. This was incorporated without widening and became a notorious bottleneck for 50 years; see p.25 of the Highway Development Survey, 1937.) From there the Lea Valley viaduct, built in 1924–26, carried the road to Walthamstow, with the road ending at a junction with Forest Road. The final section to open, in 1934, was that from Hanger Lane to Stonebridge Park, which required diversion of the Grand Union Canal, including an aqueduct over the new road.

Some sections of new road were built to dual carriageway standards, with a 27-foot (8.2 m) wide carriageway accompanied by 9-foot (2.7 m) verges. In 1937 the Highway Development Survey reported that of the 19 miles of the North Circular, 4 miles were dual-carriageway, 3 miles were single-carriageways of more than 30 feet width, while the remaining 12 miles were single-carriageways of 30 feet or less. Some of these were existing roads used as they were (e.g. Gunnersbury Avenue; Dog Lane bridge, Neasden (Note: As part of its construction of the railway, the Metropolitan Railway Company had built a bridge for Dog Lane. This was incorporated in the North Circular and has since been widened repeatedly. It explains why the road makes a dog-leg at Neasden.); Bowes Road); in other places the land acquired for the road was much wider (often 100 feet (Note: This was the width recommended by the Royal Commission on London Traffic for "First-class Arterial Streets"; it was the distance between fences and included land for footways, etc. (Report §67(1)))), but perceived demand had not justified building a wider road yet. By the end of the decade, the area surrounding the Park Royal estate had become the largest industrial estate in the south of England, and the London Passenger Transport Board was receiving regular complaints about the excess traffic levels.

Due to laxer laws that allowed housing to be built on major roads, as London suburbs developed, residential properties were built on the North Circular Road. The original purpose-built road had been designed subject to the (widely-ignored) national speed limit of 20 mph. This was lifted in 1930, but by 1951 a 30 mph speed limit was enforced along the route.

In 1946 the North Circular Road became a trunk road, funded from a national budget set by the Ministry of Transport (MOT) rather than a series of local roads.

=== London Ringways ===
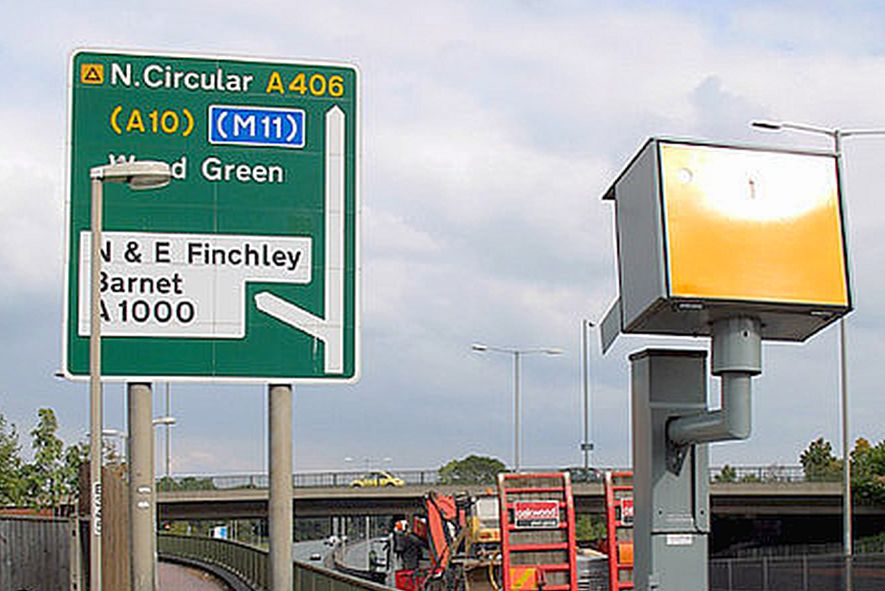
Since 1951, the North Circular has been subject to speed limits along its route; these are now enforced with speed cameras.

After reviewing traffic conditions in 1961, the Ministry of Transport planned to increase the capacity of the North Circular Road, grade separating as many junctions as possible, particularly those connecting with important arterial routes. In the 1960s the Greater London Council developed the London Ringways Plan to construct a series of circular and radial motorways throughout London with the hope of easing traffic congestion in the central area. Under this plan the North Circular Road was to be improved to dual-carriageway standard throughout the majority of its length by the late 1970s.

The Ringway projects were extremely unpopular and caused widespread protests, which led to the cancellation of the plans in 1972, particularly after the Westway had opened in the face of large-scale protest two years earlier. In 1974, the MOT scaled back plans to improve the North Circular Road, though by the end of the decade they had revised plans to improve the route to dual carriageway throughout without any property frontages. In 1979, the Ministry of Transport planned to improve the Great Cambridge Road Roundabout with a £17 million scheme that would have demolished over 100 houses and shops. This was cancelled and replaced with a straightforward underpass in 1983, costing £22.3 million.

=== South Woodford to Barking Relief Road ===
The section of the North Circular south of Charlie Brown's Roundabout in South Woodford is the "South Woodford to Barking Relief Road". Prior to its opening, the signposted North Circular route from the Waterworks Roundabout to the Woolwich Ferry was on local roads via Whipps Cross, Wanstead, Manor Park and Beckton. As well as delays for the ferry, traffic could also be held due to closure of bridges in the Royal Albert and King George V Docks. The road was originally planned to be a continuation of the M11, but the standard of road was decreased to a basic dual carriageway. It was proposed to be built in the 1980s concurrently with the controversial M11 link road.

=== Henlys Corner and Bounds Green improvements ===
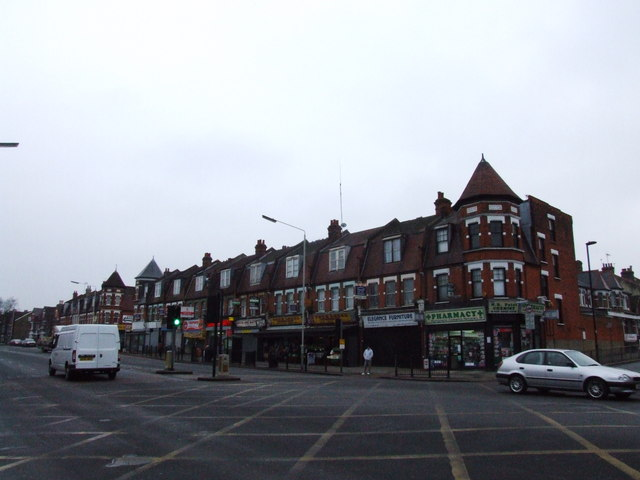
A parade of shops near Bowes Park, just to the east of the Bounds Green traffic lights

The North Circular Road ceased to be a trunk road in 2000, when control of all roads inside Greater London passed to Transport for London (TfL). In 2004, Mayor of London Ken Livingstone promised limited improvements to the road, but received criticism for not approving earlier plans for widening the often heavily congested road at critical sections. In 2009, it was announced that major works between the Bounds Green Road and Green Lanes junctions would finally go ahead, having been proposed for over 90 years, and was completed the following year. The work improved the carriageway between these junctions, widening Telford Road to two lanes and improving all of the junctions along the route. Improvements were also made to walkways and cycle paths along this route. However, unlike elsewhere on the North Circular, the new junctions are not grade-separated and have been designed with environmental concerns in mind. The opened scheme is a reduced specification from 1960s plans, which projected this section of the North Circular to be dual carriageway.

In April 2011, after many years of proposals and delays, construction began on a major upgrade of the Henlys Corner interchange. An underpass was originally proposed but this was heavily criticised by local residents, and would have been very costly, and it was subsequently scrapped. The upgrade scheme improved on the current junction by adding extra lanes and allowing easier left and right turns, speeding up queue times. Cycle paths and safer pedestrian crossings, like the Wilmer Way footbridge, were included.

In July 2013, a task force set up by the Mayor of London Boris Johnson proposed that long sections of the North Circular (as well as the South Circular) should be put underground in road tunnels, freeing up space on the surface to provide public space, extensive cycle routes, and better links to existing communities currently severed by the road. Caroline Pidgeon, deputy chair of the London Assembly's Transport Committee, responded, "It doesn't make sense and it won't add up – [there's a] £30bn estimate, but I'm sure it'll cost at least double that, and the reality is we'll lose homes around these roads and so on."

== Environment and safety ==
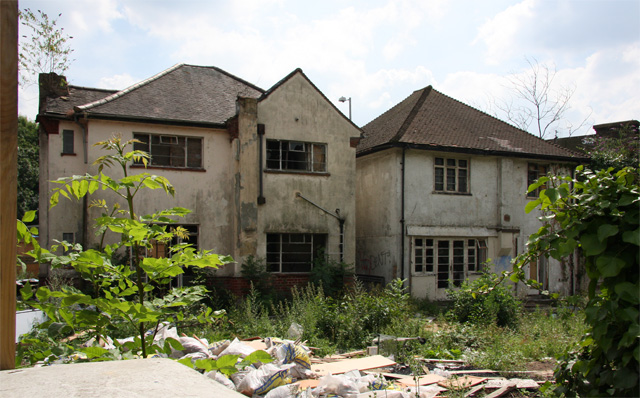
Blighted properties on the North Circular Road attract fly tipping. These houses have since been demolished.

The North Circular Road has received regular criticism over its poor safety record and piecemeal improvement schemes due to a lack of funding since it opened to traffic. In 1989, Michael Portillo, then a Member of Parliament for Enfield Southgate, complained that 367 houses were scheduled for demolition as part of improvements to the North Circular in his constituency. Friends of the Earth have complained about rising costs and delays to junction and safety improvements. In 2003, environment cabinet member Terry Neville said that TfL's proposed improvements for improving the North Circular were "a sham" and that the local council wanted a six-lane motorway to properly solve congestion.

The uncertainty over the future of the North Circular Road has blighted properties on and near it, particularly around Bounds Green. Around 1972, approximately 400 homes on the road were compulsorily purchased by the Greater London Council in conjunction with widening schemes that were then cancelled. The properties have suffered from a lack of long-term care. Since TfL took responsibility for the road, land for future schemes has been left dormant, resulting in urban decay with derelict properties. Compulsorily purchased properties were let out to various short-term tenants, which led to them housing prostitutes and migrant workers living in increasing squalor. Pedestrians have become too frightened to use underpasses along the road, particularly to access North Middlesex Hospital. Areas close to the road, such as the alleys behind properties on the Telford Road section, have suffered from fly tipping and anti-social behaviour.

In 2011, Enfield Borough Council proposed a North Circular Area Action Plan, which would regenerate the area immediately around Telford Road and Bowes Road, and encourage growth. This includes new pedestrian crossings and improved access to existing open spaces, including Arnos Park and Broomfield Park.

In 2002, the North Circular was rated as Britain's noisiest road by the UK Noise Association. In 2013, the road was named in a BBC report as being the most polluted in London, including the highest surveyed levels of benzene and nitrogen dioxide. A report in the Sunday Times, referring to the North Circular, said "if you want to pull back the lid of your convertible and drink in the fresh air, look elsewhere". In 2019, a BBC News report said that the section between Chiswick and Hanger Lane was the most congested in Britain.

== Junctions ==
The North Circular Road has a wide variety of styles and standards of junctions connecting to other roads. These range from the complex, grade-separated design at Charlie Brown's near Woodford, to at-grade junctions with traffic lights. The original road contained entirely at-grade junctions; many of these were improved and grade separated during the late 1970s and early 1980s.

=== Current junctions ===
Name	Destinations	Notes
Chiswick flyover	A315 / A4 / A205 – Chiswick, Kew, Brentford, Staines-upon-Thames, Hounslow	
Gunnersbury Park	B4491 / A4000 – South Ealing, Shepherd's Bush, Acton	
	A4020 – Ealing, Southall, Acton	The historic London – Oxford postal route at Ealing Common
Hanger Lane Gyratory	A40 / A4005 – Greenford, Perivale, Alperton, Park Royal, Acton, Northolt	
	A404 – Harrow, Wembley, Harlesden	Near Stonebridge Park station
	Brent Park, Superstores, Wembley Stadium, Industrial Estate	
	A4088 – Willesden, Neasden, Kingsbury	
Staples Corner	M1 / A5 – The NORTH, Watford, Harrow, Kilburn, Cricklewood, Edgware, West Hendon	A5 is the historic Watling Street from London to Wroxeter
Brent Cross	A41 to A1 – Kilburn, Cricklewood, Hendon, Hatfield	
	A502 to A1 – Mill Hill, Golders Green, Hampstead	
Henlys Corner	A1 to M1 – The NORTH, Watford, Mill Hill, Hendon	West end of merge with the A1
Henlys Corner	A598 – Finchley, Golders Green	A special pedestrian crossing for Jews to use on the Sabbath is located here
Henlys Corner	A1 – Central London, Holloway	East end of merge with A1
	A1000 – North Finchley, East Finchley, Chipping Barnet	The historic Great North Road
Colney Hatch Junction	B550 – Muswell Hill, Friern Barnet, Retail Park	
Hobart Corner	A109 / A1004 – New Southgate, Whetstone, Southgate	
Bounds Green interchange	A1110 / B1452 – New Southgate, Southgate	A regular congestion hotspot where traffic must narrow to single carriageway and perform a 90 degree turn. Transport for London have earmarked the junction for improvement.
Bowes Road Junction	B106 - Southgate, Muswell Hill	Junction with the B106 towards Bounds Green and Muswell Hill as well as the unclassified Powys Lane which leads to the A1004 and signposted as (A10004). Eastbound traffic cannot access B106 apart from buses.
Clockhouse Junction	A105 – Palmers Green, Wood Green, Hornsey	
Great Cambridge Road Roundabout	A10 to M25 / A111 – Central London, Dalston, Hertford, Enfield, Potters Bar, Ware, Royston, Cambridge	
Cooks Ferry interchange	A1009 – Chingford, Waltham Abbey, Industrial Estates	Named after the former Cooks Ferry pub, demolished in the 1990s for the North Circular Road Widening Scheme
Crooked Billet Roundabout	A112 – Chingford, Walthamstow, Highams Park	
Waterworks	A104 to A503 / M11 – Woodford, Leytonstone, Walthamstow	
Charlie Brown's	A1400 / A113 – Gants Hill, Chigwell	Restricted access; eastbound exit and westbound entrance. The original Charlie Brown's was the roundabout underneath this junction. It was named after a pub next to the roundabout, which was demolished in 1972.
Charlie Brown's	M11 – Stansted, Cambridge	
Redbridge Roundabout	A12 – Central London, Stratford, Chelmsford, Romford	Also the location of Redbridge tube station
Ilford Garden Junction	A118 – Manor Park, Ilford	The historic Roman Road from London to Colchester
	A124 – East Ham, Barking, London	
Beckton Roundabout	A13 / A1020 (North Circular) to M25 / A117 – Tilbury, Dartford Crossing, Woolwich Ferry, Central London, Blackwall Tunnel	

=== Former junctions ===
Name	Destinations	Notes
Waterworks Corner	A104 / A503	To avoid Epping Forest, the original build of the North Circular met the A104 at a different location by a water works northeast of Walthamstow.
Gants Hill	A12 / A123	Gants Hill Underground station is also at this location.

== Public transport ==
There are four bus routes that largely serve their routes on the North Circular Road:

- London Buses route 34: between Arnos Grove and South Chingford (Crooked Billet Roundabout)
- London Buses route 112: between North Ealing tube station and Finchley (Great North Road), serving Brent Cross Shopping Centre
- London Buses route 232: between Brent Park and Palmers Green (Green Lanes), serving Brent Cross Shopping Centre
- London Buses route SL1: between Arnos Grove and South Chingford (Crooked Billet Roundabout)

== Cultural references ==
The North Circular Road is mentioned in the poet Louis MacNeice's 1938 piece, Autumn Journal. In it, he describes the features along the road, including factories, prefabricated buildings, bungalows and petrol pumps "like intransigent gangs of idols". Keith Moon played his first gig with The Who at a pub on the North Circular Road on 2 May 1964.

The original Ace Cafe was on the North Circular Road. Open 24 hours a day, it catered for late-night party-goers and boy racers. It was a popular place for cars to be hot-wired and stolen, as drivers knew they could make a quick getaway. IWG founder Mark Dixon's first business on returning to Britain after an extended time abroad was a hot-dog stand on the North Circular Road, making his own buns. He grew the business into a full-time bakery which he sold in 1989 for £800,000.
