= Oak Hill Wood =

Woodland in the London Borough of Barnet, England

Coordinates: 51.6409°N 0.1521°W

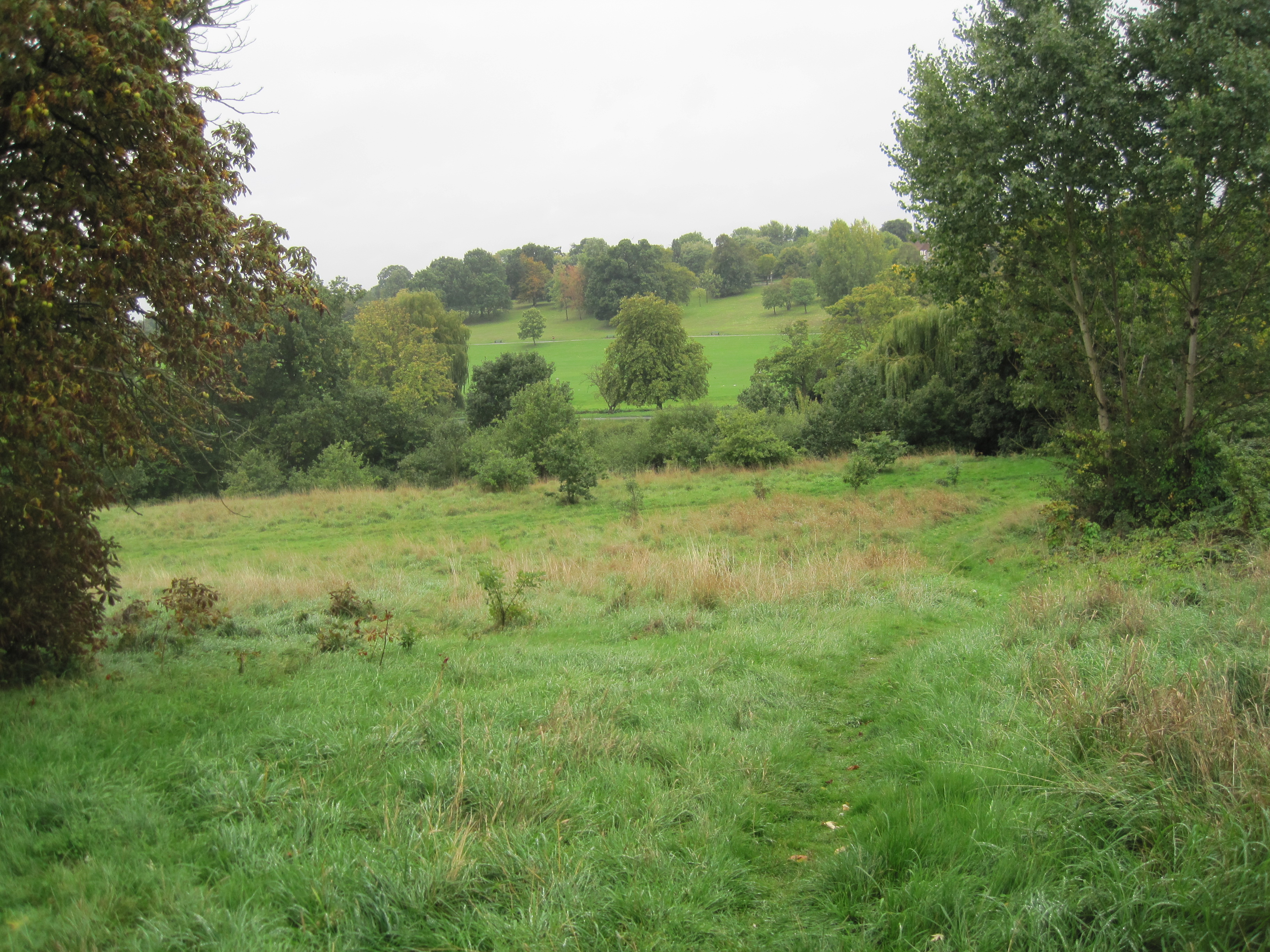
Oak Hill Wood meadow with Oak Hill Park in the distance

Oak Hill Wood is a 10-hectare Local Nature Reserve (LNR) and a Site of Borough Importance for Nature Conservation Grade I, in East Barnet, London. It is owned by the London Borough of Barnet, and part of it is a 5.5-hectare nature reserve managed by the London Wildlife Trust.

It is an ancient woodland, dominated by pedunculate oak, hornbeam and ash. A shrub layer includes hawthorns, field maples and wild service trees, and among the ground flora are bluebells and wood anemones. Breeding birds include tawny owls, Eurasian nuthatches, Eurasian treecreepers and stock doves. A small stream flows through the wood to join Pymme's Brook, which is also a Site of Importance for Nature Conservation, in the neighbouring Oak Hill Park.

There is also an area of meadow which contains common wild flowers such as lady's bedstraw and common knapweed. It has common butterflies such as gatekeeper, common blue and large blue.

Oak Hill Wood dates back to at least the 11th century, when it was owned by the Church. After the dissolution of the monasteries, Church lands were sold in 1536–38 and incorporated in the Oak Hill Estate. In 1930 East Barnet Council acquired the land, and Oak Hill Park, including Oak Hill Wood, was opened to the public in 1933. In 1997 the wood was designated a Local Nature Reserve. An area of rough grassland in Oak Hill Park is included in the LNR.

There is access from Mansfield Avenue, Daneland and Brookside, as well as from Oak Hill Park.
