= Pymmes Brook Trail =

Coordinates: 51°35′17.17″N 0°3′29.42″W

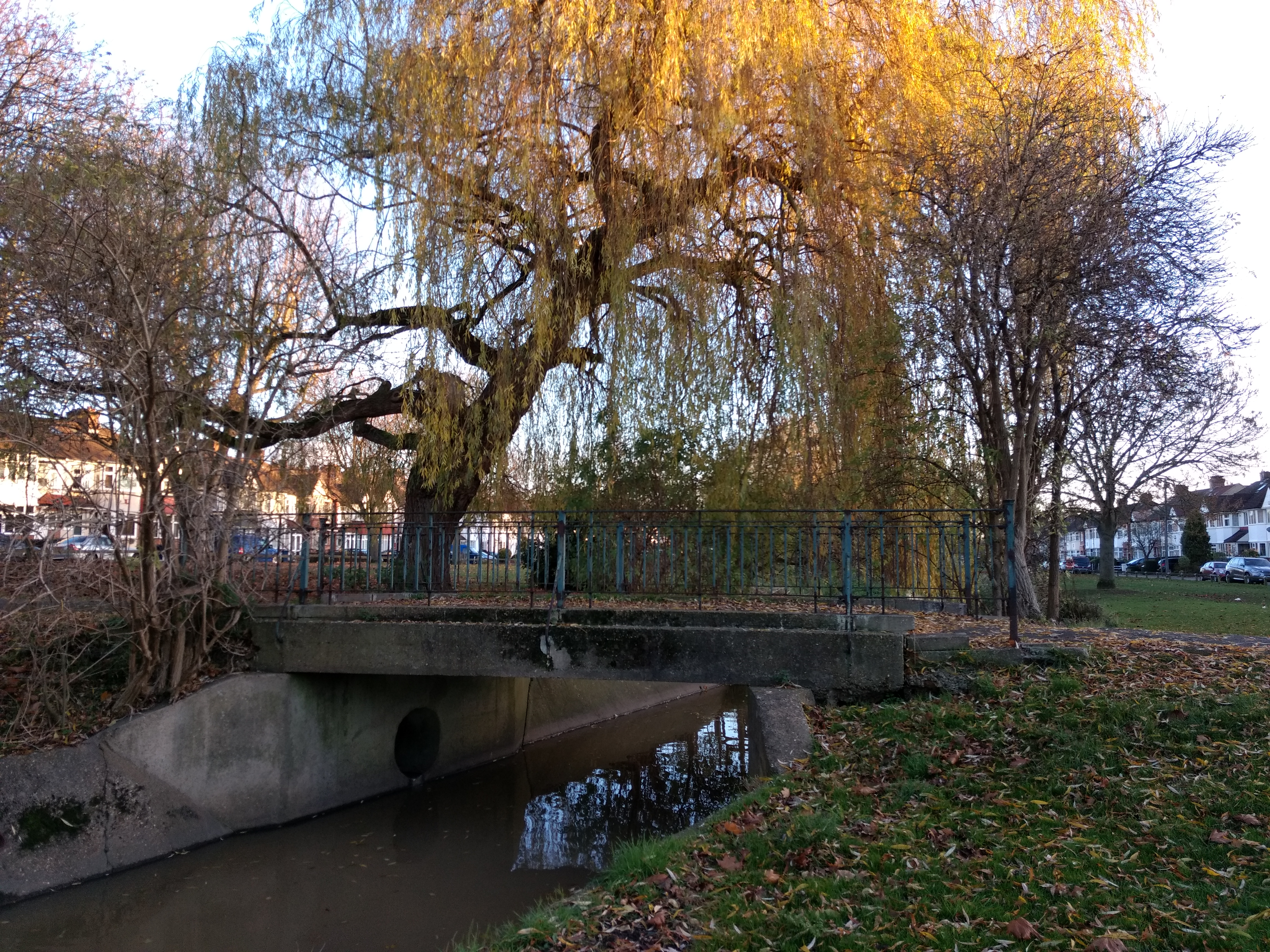
Pymmes Brook Trail Bridge

The Pymmes Brook Trail is located in the London Boroughs of Barnet, Enfield and Haringey and is just under 13 miles (21 km) long. The brook is named after William Pymme, a local landowner.

The trail goes from Hadley Green to Tottenham Hale, where the trail connects with the Lea Valley Walk. Most of the first half of the trail, as far as Arnos Park, runs beside Pymmes Brook, but after that the brook is only encountered intermittently as much of the brook passes through private land which is not open to the public. In its lower reaches sections of the brook have been culverted to alleviate the risk of flooding.

== Course ==
The trail starts on Hadley Green, where the headwaters of Pymmes Brook rise, with a link from High Barnet tube station. Together with the London Loop, it then drops through Monken Hadley Common to Jack's Lake, to meet another link from Cockfosters tube station. Pymmes Brook proper starts here as it flows out from Jack's Lake. The trail detours through Victoria Recreation Ground, where Pymmes Brook is joined with Shirebourne brook, then follows a short street section to rejoin the brook at East Barnet Village. It then runs beside the brook through Oak Hill Park and Brunswick Park to the halfway point in Arnos Park, with a link to Arnos Grove tube station. It is also where Pymmes Brook is joined by Bounds Green Brook. The trail then leaves the brook to pass through Broomfield Park and Palmers Green. It crosses over the New River at Oakthorpe Road, then the North Circular Road, to divert through two new public open spaces - Bowes Meadow and Tile Kiln Lane Open Space - where Pymmes Brook can be followed again. The trail recrosses the North Circular Road onto Silver Street, Edmonton, where the path enters the gardens of Millfield House. From here the trail leads to Pymmes Park and another brookside section, then to Fore Street, where the brook flows underground to merge with Salmons Brook to the south of Angel Road. As of 2018, the trail must temporarily follow public throughfares for a short distance, but will eventually take a new route when access to the brook is opened up in the Meridian Water development. Finally, the trail passes through Tottenham Marshes, beside Pymmes Brook and past Stonebridge Lock on the Lee Navigation, to reach the point where the brook joins the River Lea. The trail connects with the Lea Valley Walk at Tottenham Lock, with a link to Tottenham Hale station.

== Gallery ==
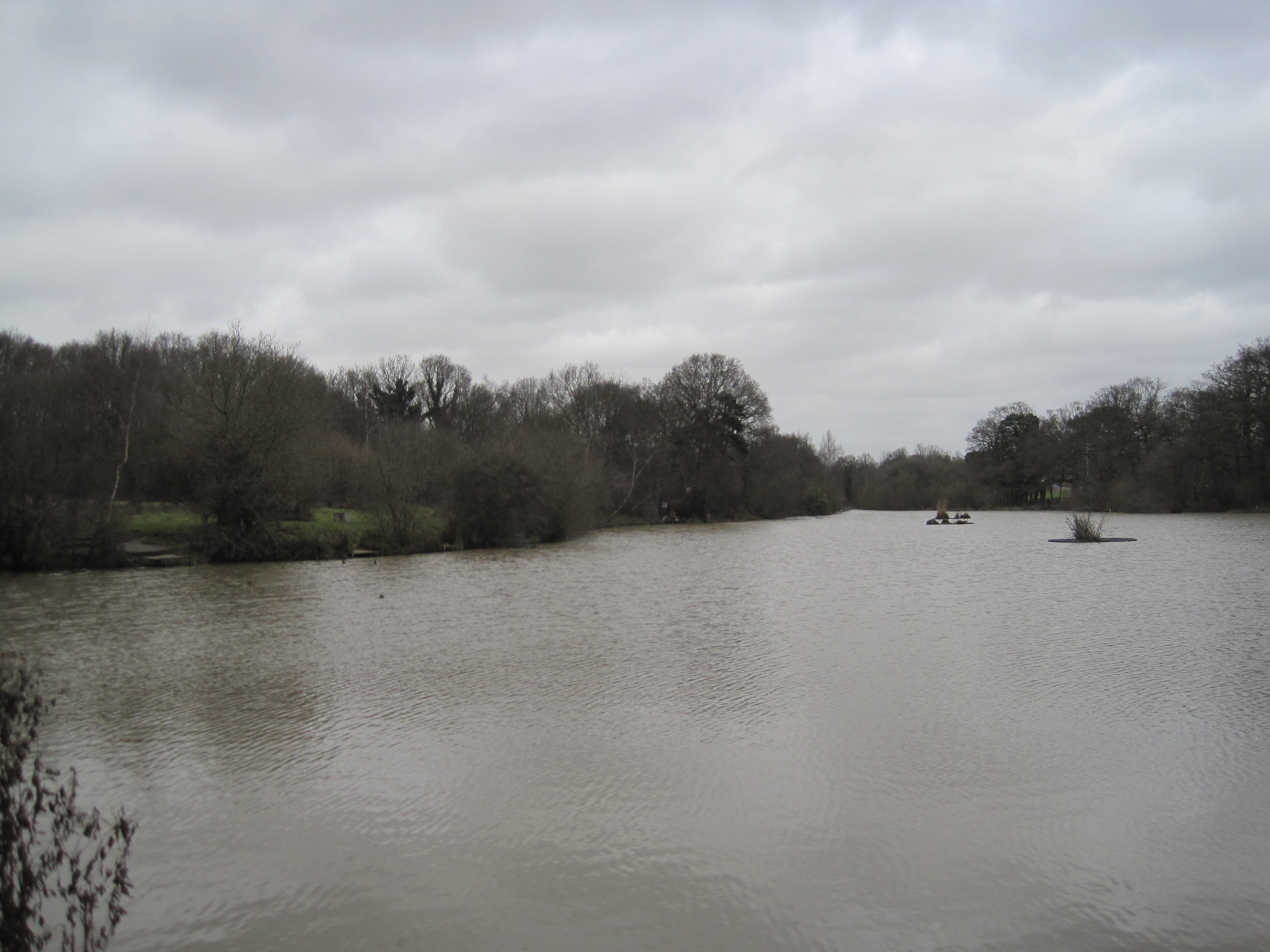
Jack's Lake on Monken Hadley Common

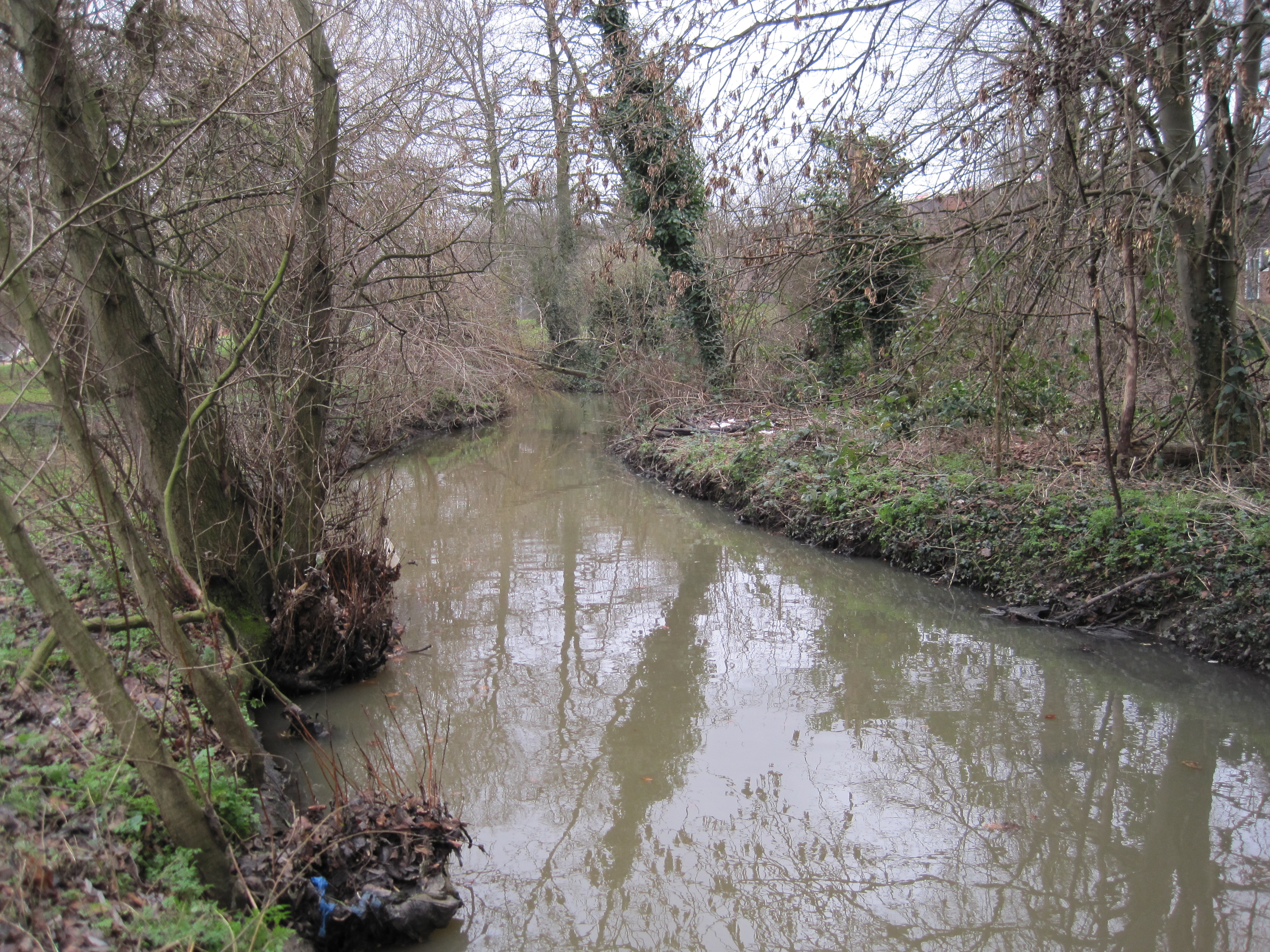
Pymmes Brook in Arnos Park

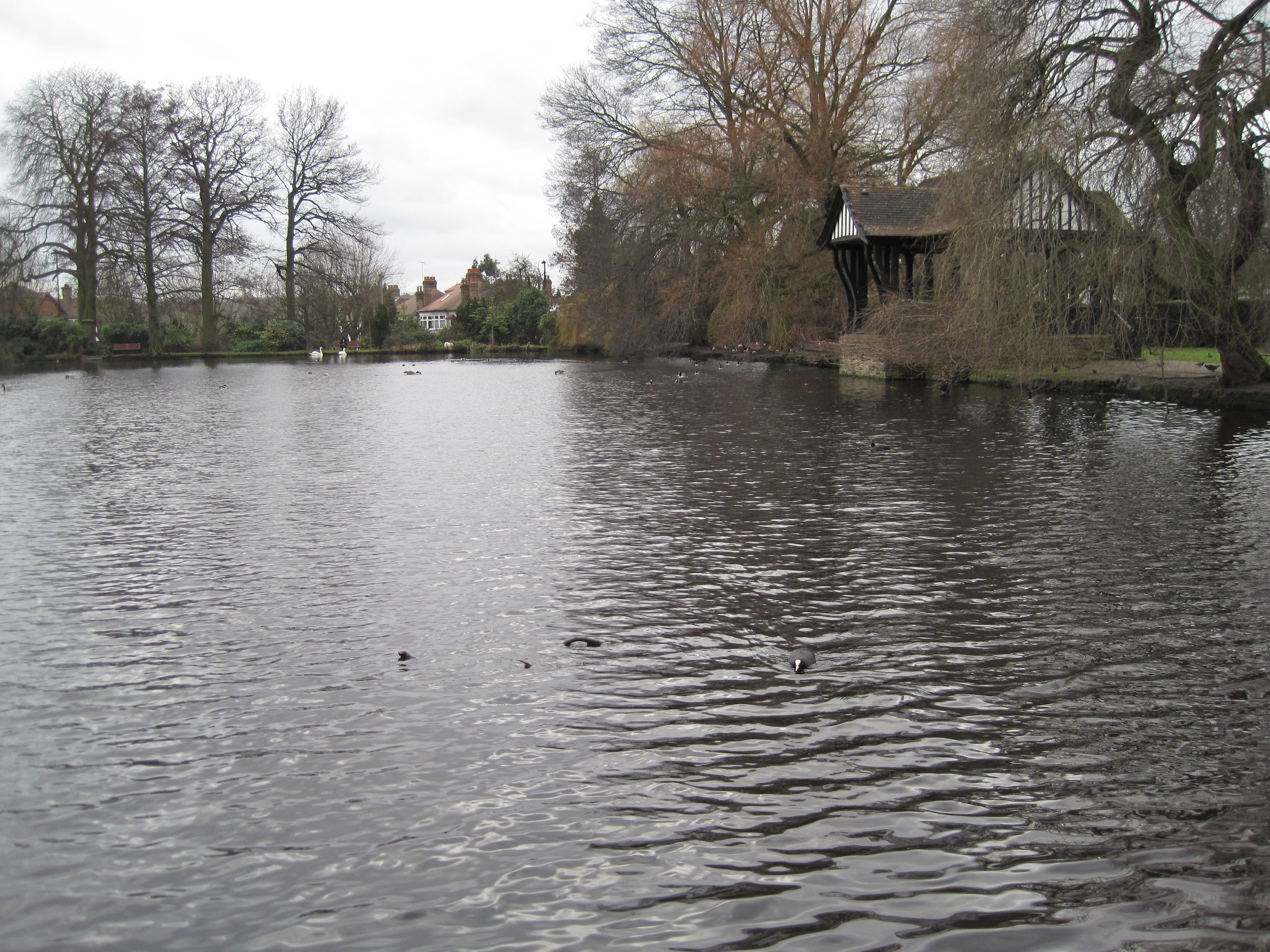
Broomfield Park lake

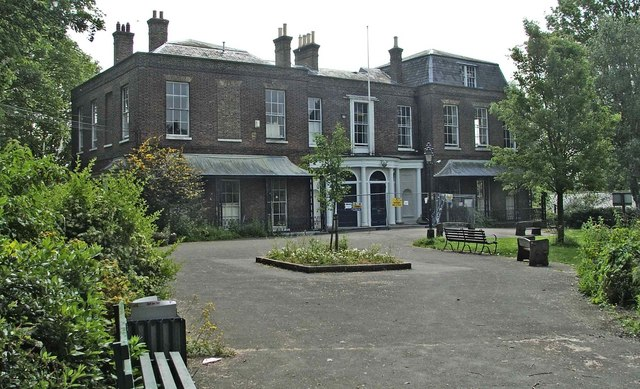
Millfield House

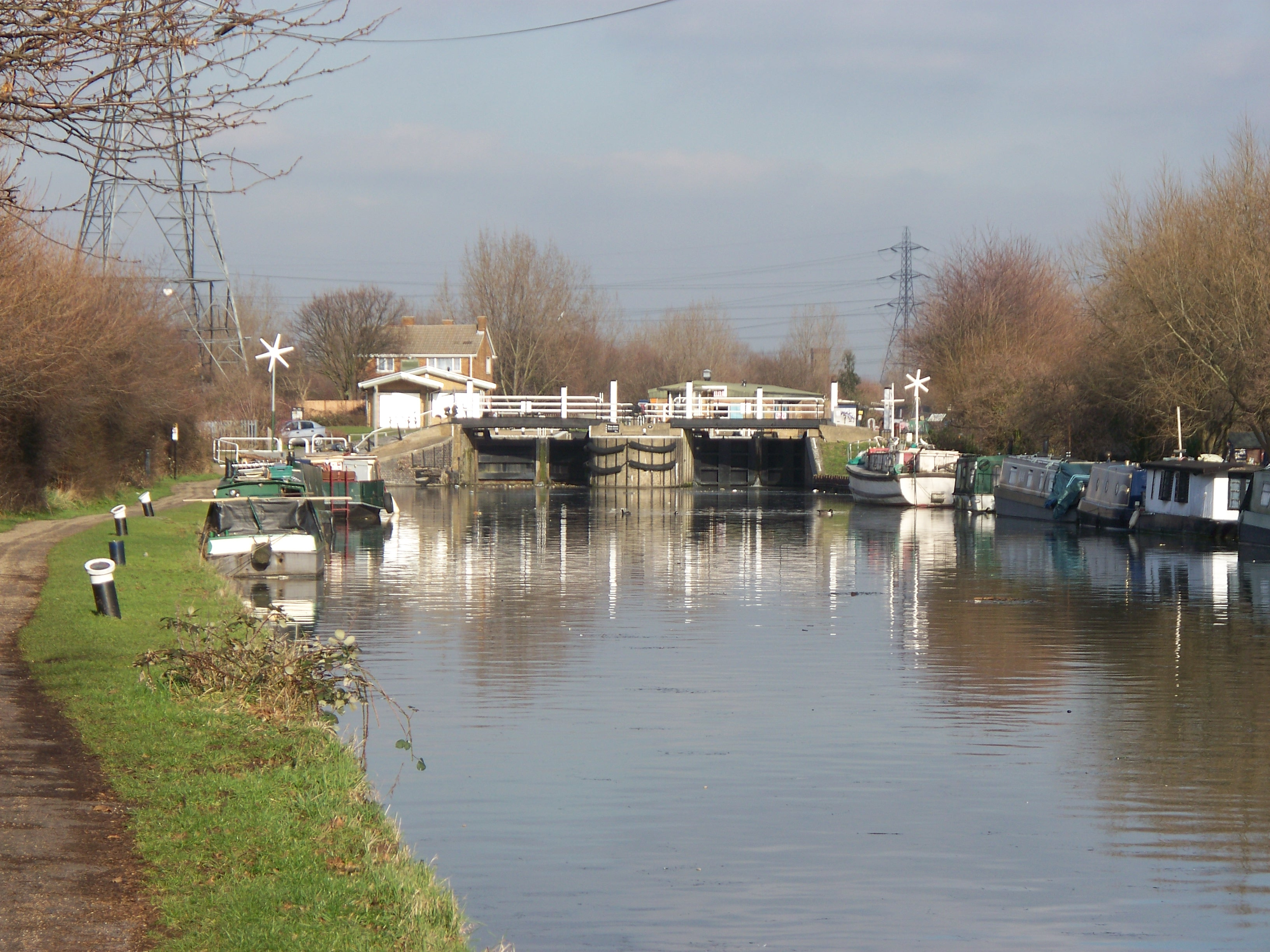
Stonebridge Lock on the Lee Navigation
