= Pymmes House =

Coordinates: 51.615366°N 0.069710°W

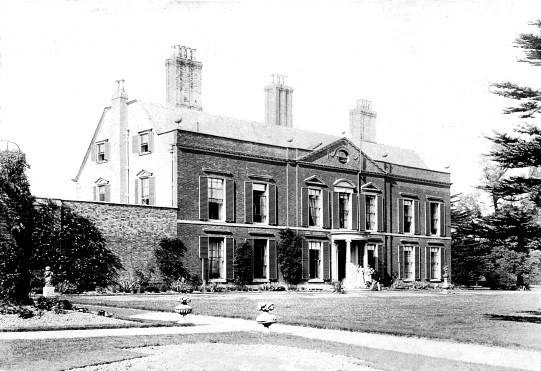
Pymmes House in 1895

Pymmes House was a house built by William Pymme in 1327 in what is now Pymmes Park, in Edmonton, London. It had a succession of notable owners, particularly in the Elizabethan period, and was remodelled and rebuilt several times. It was demolished after a fire in 1940.

== History ==
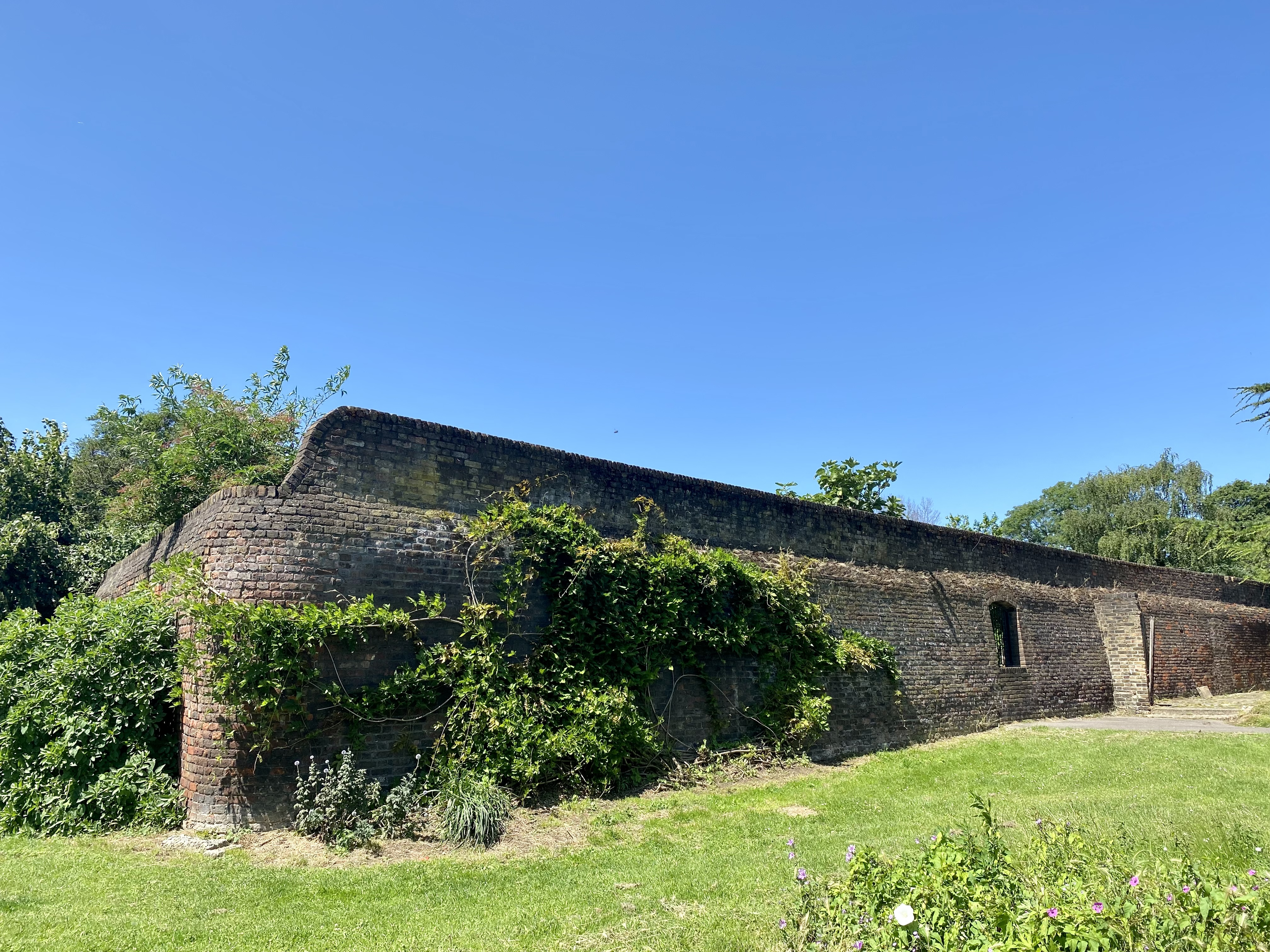
The former garden walls in Pymmes Park

The first Pymmes House was built in 1327 by William Pymme, a landowner in Edmonton, now in London, and member of the Pymme family who had been granted land by Edward II in the 14th century.

It was sited on the north side of Watery Lane in Edmonton, now known as Silver Street. The house was subsequently occupied by a number of notable individuals including Thomas Wilson (1524–1581), William Cecil, 1st Baron Burghley (1520–1598), and Robert Cecil, 1st Earl of Salisbury (c. 1563–1612).

An inventory of the furnishings of the house was made in 1581 after the death of Thomas Wilson and was transcribed and published in 1957.

In the late 19th century the house was owned by Sir Henry Tyler, Member of Parliament and railway director. From 1875 to 1878 it was the home of Mansur Ali Khan, the Nawab of Bengal, and his family.

It was significantly remodelled more than once, but demolished after a fire in 1940 that is not thought to have been the result of Second World War bombing. The Grade II listed garden walls still exist in Pymmes Park.

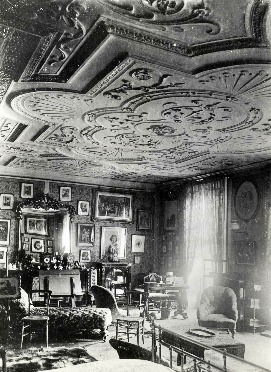
Interior view c.1890

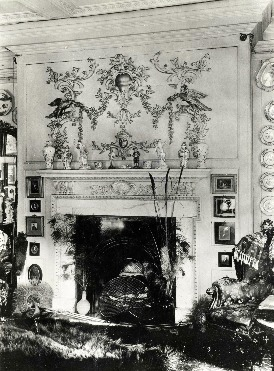
Fireplace c.1890
