= Monken Hadley Common =

Nature Reserve in Barnet, London

Coordinates: 51.6598°N 0.1775°W

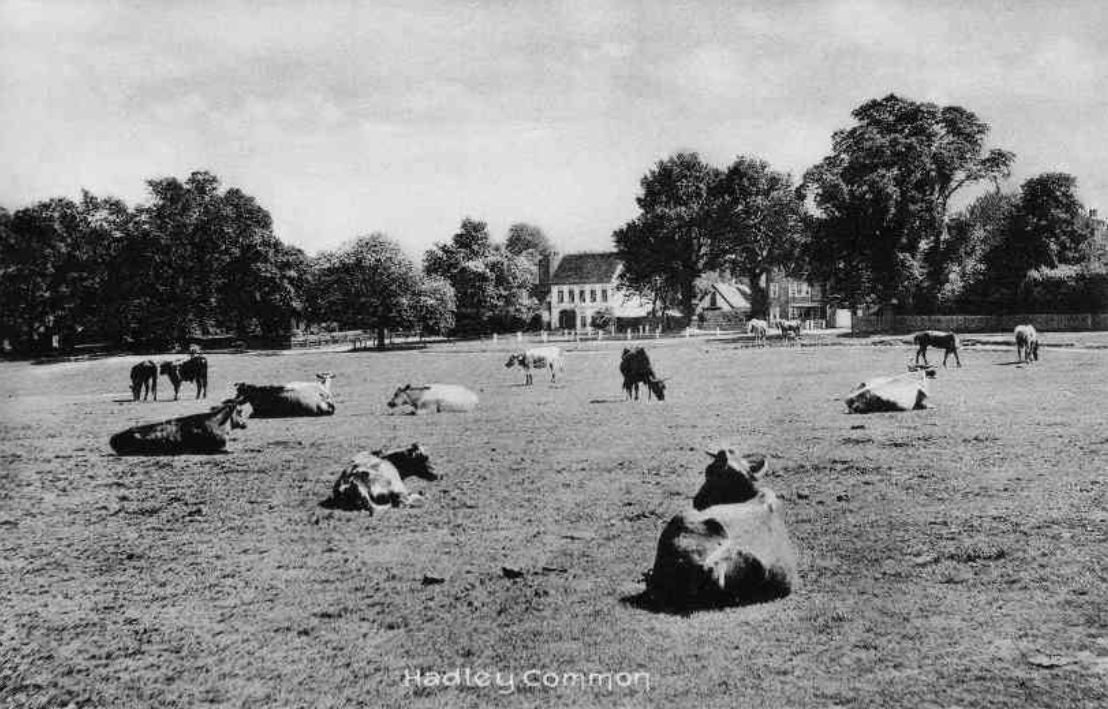
Grazing on the Common in the early 1900s. Hurst Cottage in the background.

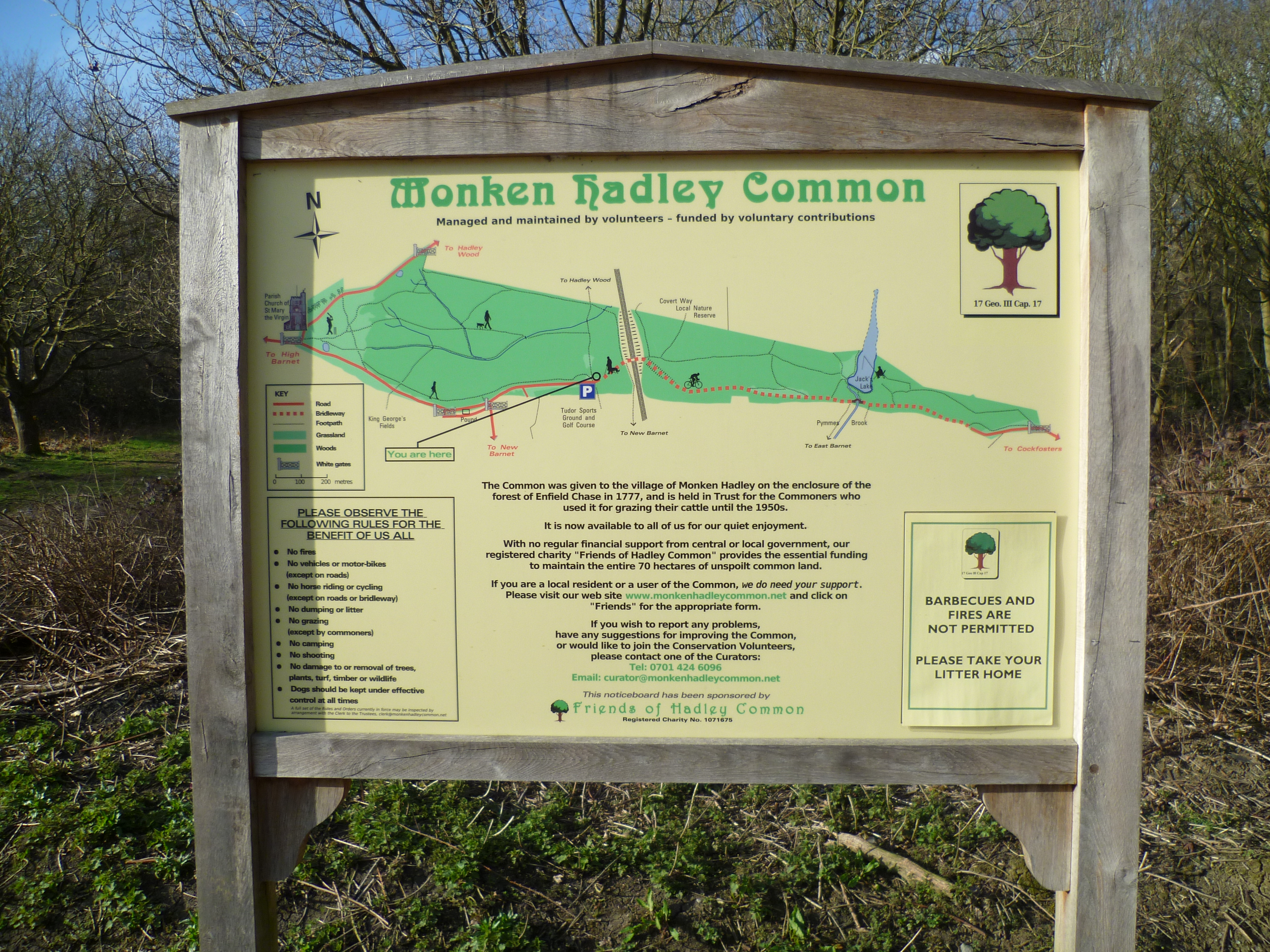
Map of the Common.

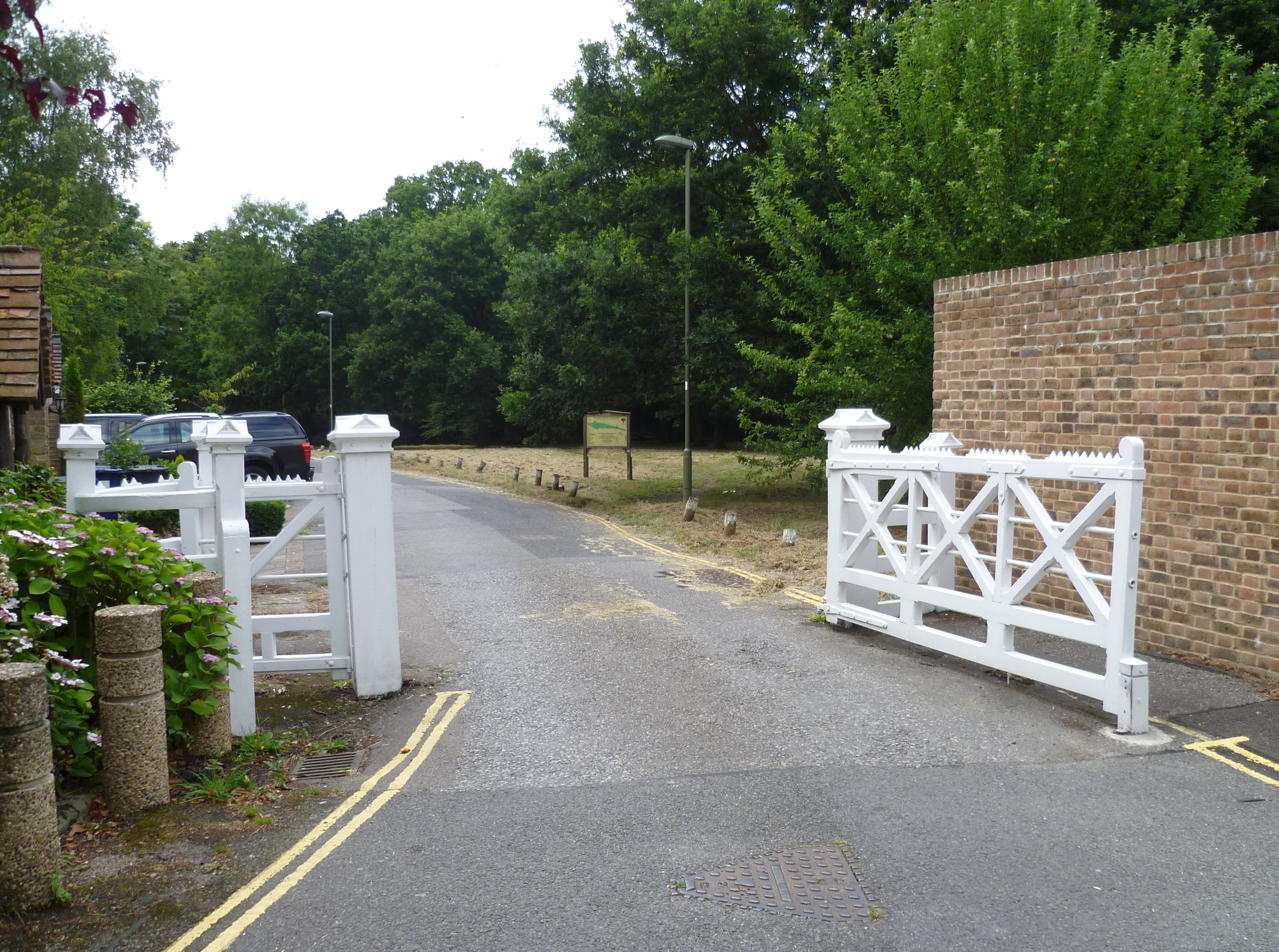
Eastern gate to the Common, Games Road, Cockfosters.

Monken Hadley Common lies within the Monken Hadley Conservation Area, and is listed as a “Site of Borough Importance for Nature Conservation, Grade I,” by the London Borough of Barnet. It is registered common land, and it is owned by the Trustees of Monken Hadley Common.

== Area ==
The common is a large area of about 72 hectares (180 acres) between Monken Hadley and Cockfosters; it is 1.5 miles (2.4 km) long and wedge shaped, one-half mile (0.8 km) wide at the Monken Hadley end and tapering to a point at the Cockfosters end.

== Access ==
There is access from Camlet Way, Parkgate Crescent, Covert Way, Games Road, Northfield Road, Baring Road (via Pymmes Brook Trail), Bakers Hill, and Hadley Common. The London Loop and Pymmes Brook Trail pass through the common.

== History ==
The common is a remnant of the former Royal Forest of Enfield Chase, which was enclosed by the Enfield Chase Act 1777 (17 Geo. 3. c. 17). A small part was allotted to the village of Monken Hadley, and this is the only land which has remained as a common. Until the 1950s, the commoners exercised their rights to use the land for grazing. The common is bisected by the East Coast Main Line.

== Habitat ==
The common is mostly wooded, dominated by pedunculate oak, with some hornbeam, beech and field maples. Holly forms a dense understorey in some places, while elsewhere a more diverse shrub layer includes Midland hawthorn and hazel. Several ground flora species are ancient woodland indicators, suggesting that fragments have survived from before the time when the common was managed as wood-pasture. Butterflies include white-letter and purple hairstreaks, and there are breeding birds such as sparrowhawk and tawny owl.

Beech Hill Lake (or Jack's Lake) was formed by damming Pymme's Brook. It is managed for angling but supports common waterfowl and Daubenton's bats use it for feeding, foraging low over the water. Two smaller ponds have a much richer flora and abundant amphibians, which attract grass snakes.

== Gallery ==
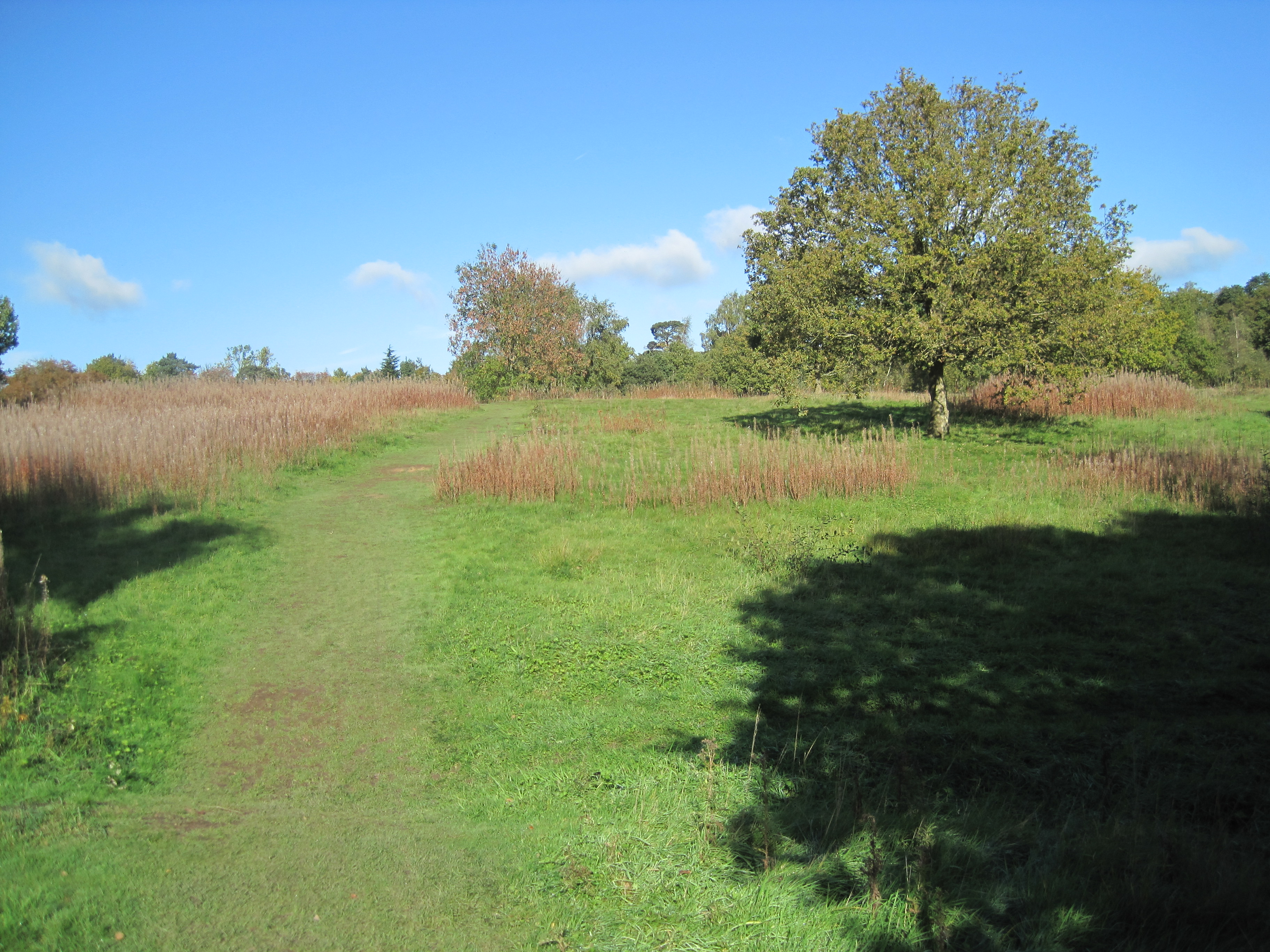
Monken Hadley Common

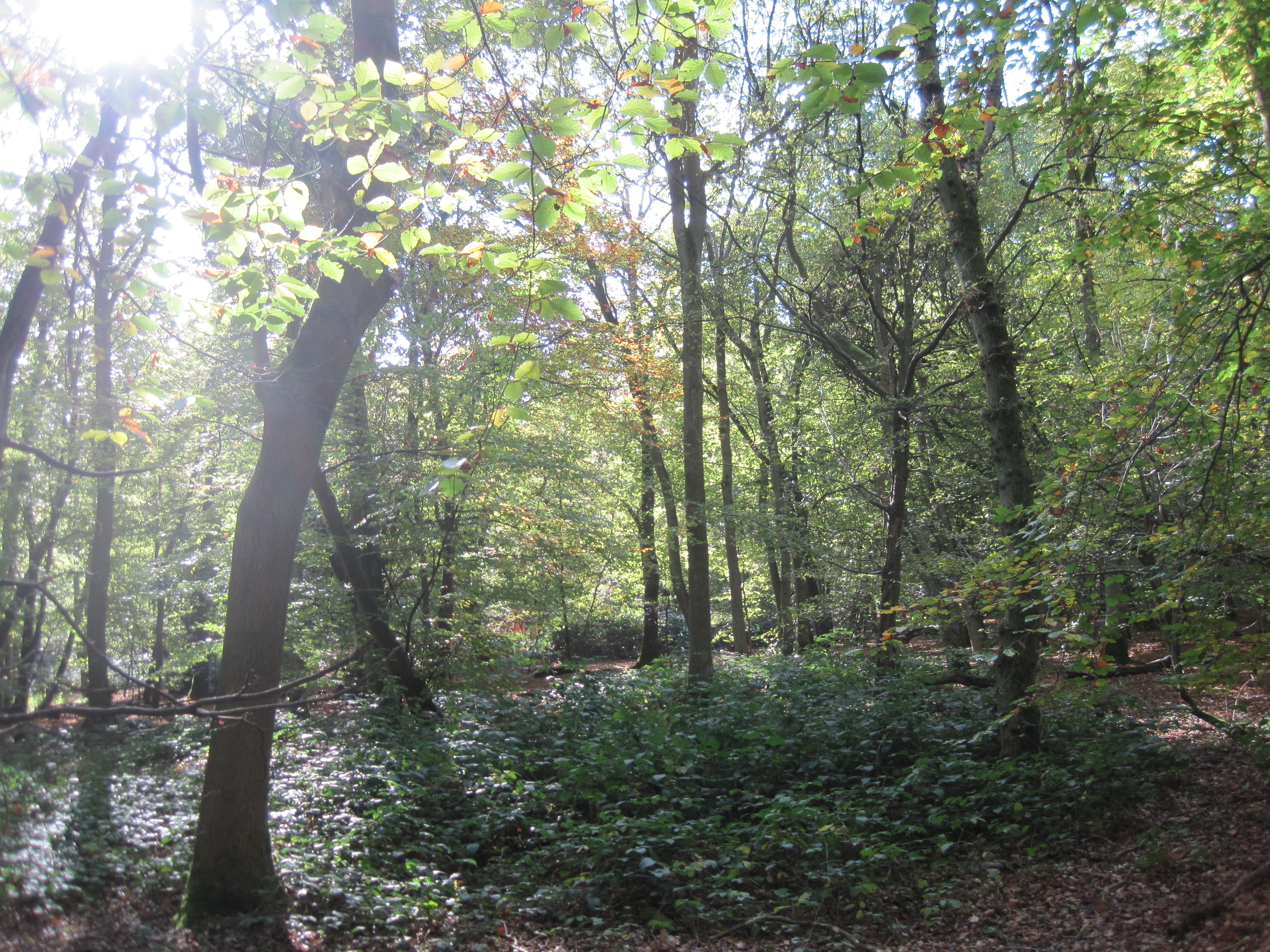
Woodland on the Common

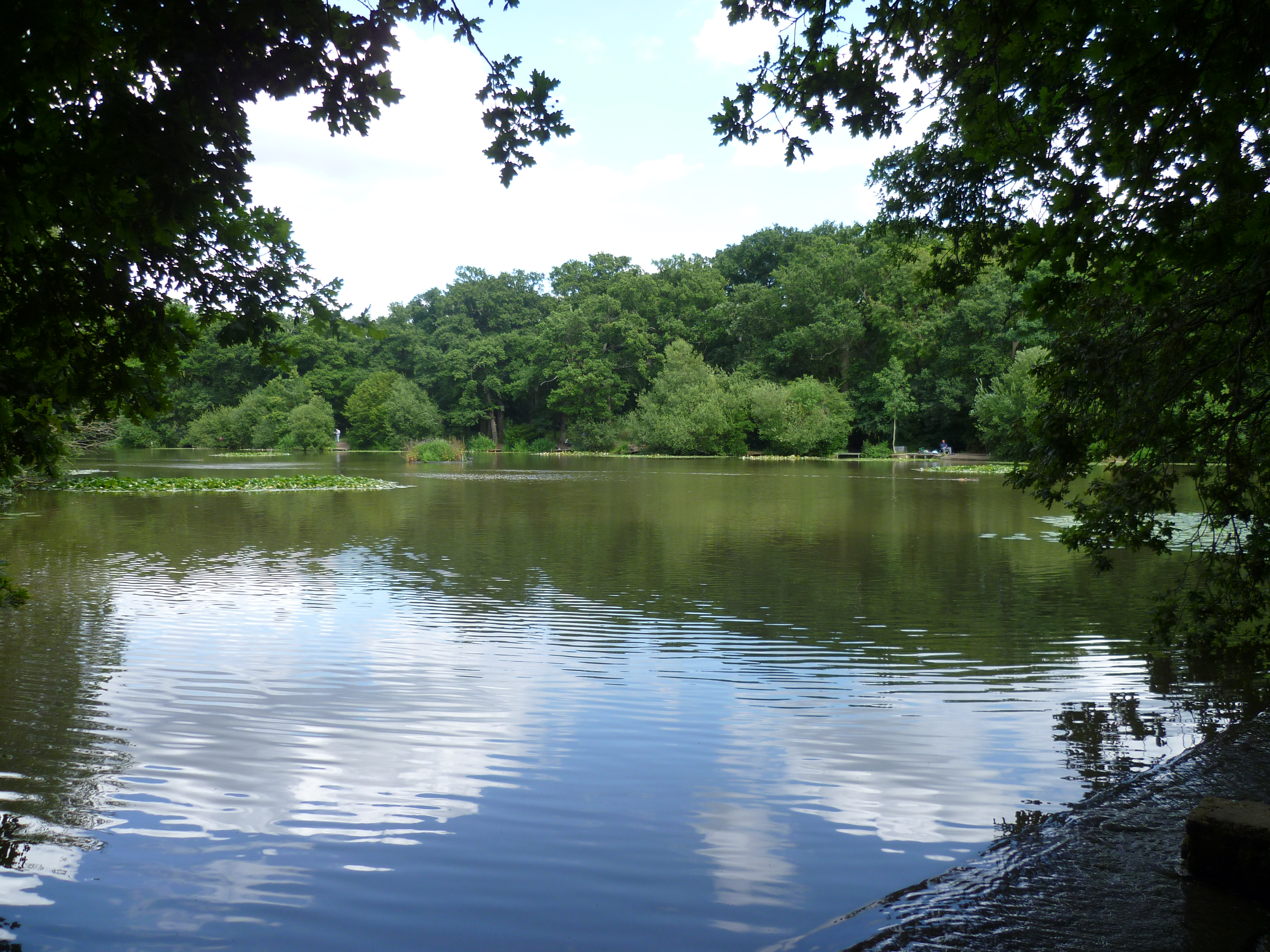
Jack's Lake

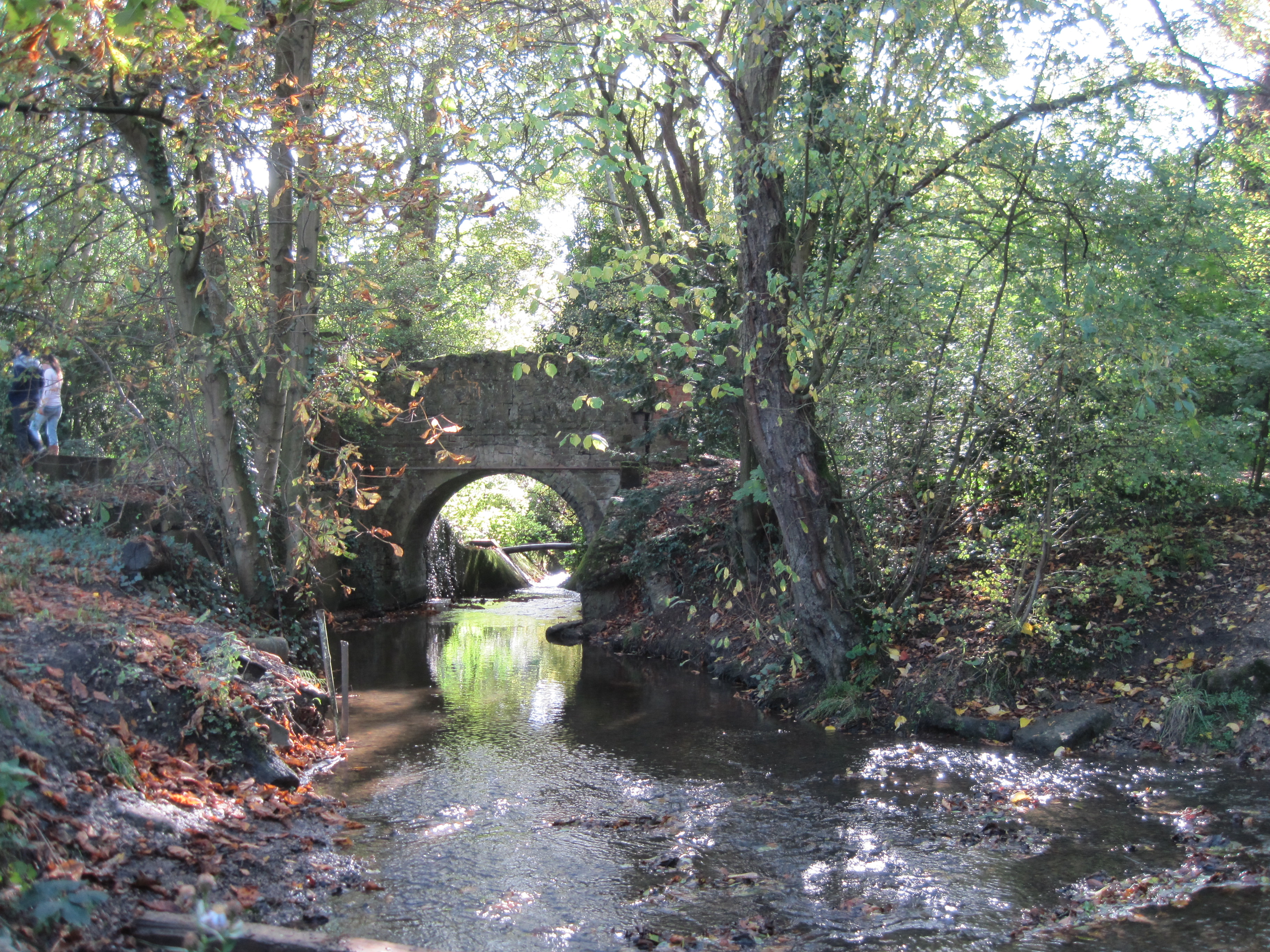
Pymme's Brook

== See also ==
- Parks and open spaces in the London Borough of Barnet
- Nature reserves in Barnet
- Lemmons
