= William Pymme =

William Pymme (fl. mid 14th-century) was a landowner in Edmonton, now in London, a member of the Pymme family who had been granted land by Edward II in the 14th century.

In 1327, Pymme built the original Pymmes House on the north side of Watery Lane in Edmonton, now known as Silver Street. The house was subsequently occupied by a number of notable individuals including Thomas Wilson (1524–1581) who was Secretary of State to Queen Elizabeth I, William Cecil, 1st Baron Burghley (1520–1598), and Robert Cecil, 1st Earl of Salisbury (c. 1563–1612). It was significantly remodelled more than once but demolished after a fire in 1940. The house was sited in what is now Pymmes Park. The Pymmes Brook, named after the family, runs through the park.

In 1362 Pymme entered into certain transactions relating to land with Adam Fraunceys.
