= Pymmes Park =

Park in Edmonton, London

Coordinates: 51.6155°N 0.0704°W

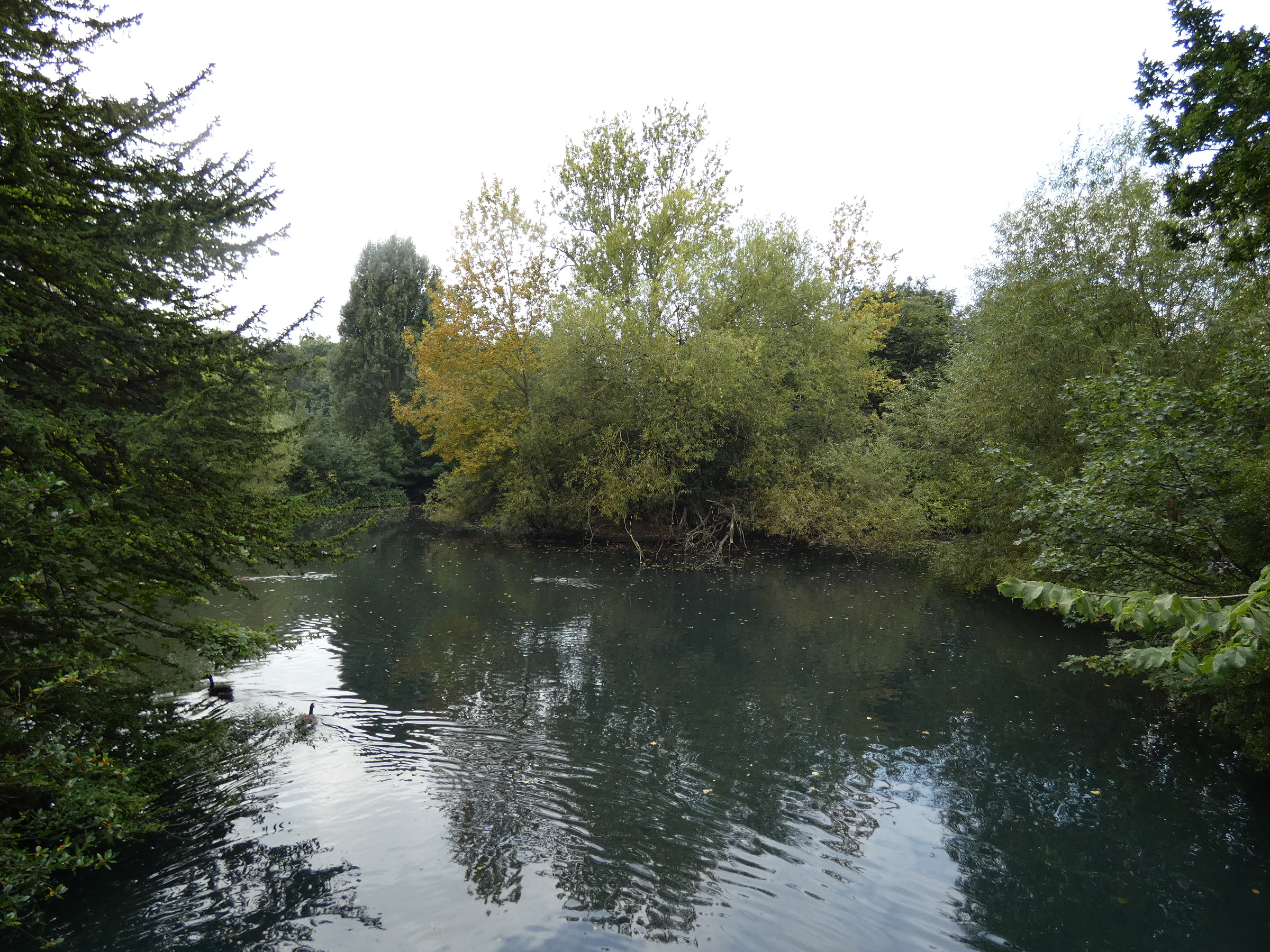
The lake at Pymmes Park

Pymmes Park is located in Edmonton, London and is bordered by the North Circular Road.

The park is Metropolitan Open Land, of local importance for nature conservation, and a site of archaeological importance.

== History ==
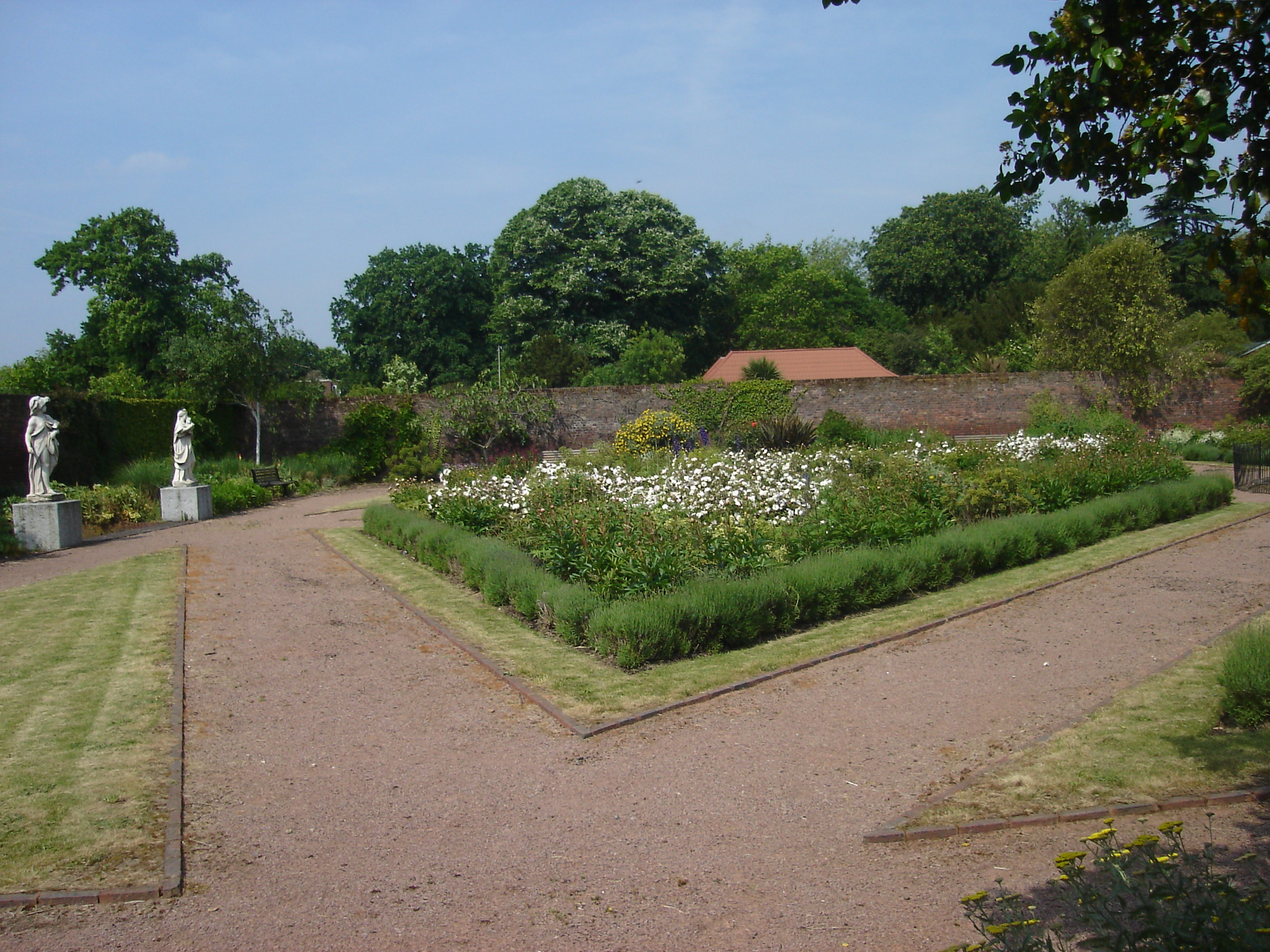
The walled garden

The area known as Pymmes Park dates back to 1327 when William Pymme built Pymmes House there. The estate changed hands several times. Thomas Wilson, a statesman, bought the estate in 1579. An inventory made after his death in 1581, and transcribed and published in 1957, includes the furnishings of his house at Pymmes.

In 1582 William Cecil, 1st Baron Burghley, Lord High Treasurer, purchased the estate which remained in the family until 1801. The Ray family owned the estate from 1808 to 1899. It was then purchased by the local council to provide public open space following an increase in the local population. The park was opened to the public in 1906.

== Gardens ==
The park contains a Victorian walled garden, bounded on three sides by Grade II-listed walls, containing an ornamental pond, herbaceous borders and bedding plants. Access is on request to a member of the park's staff.

== Recent history ==
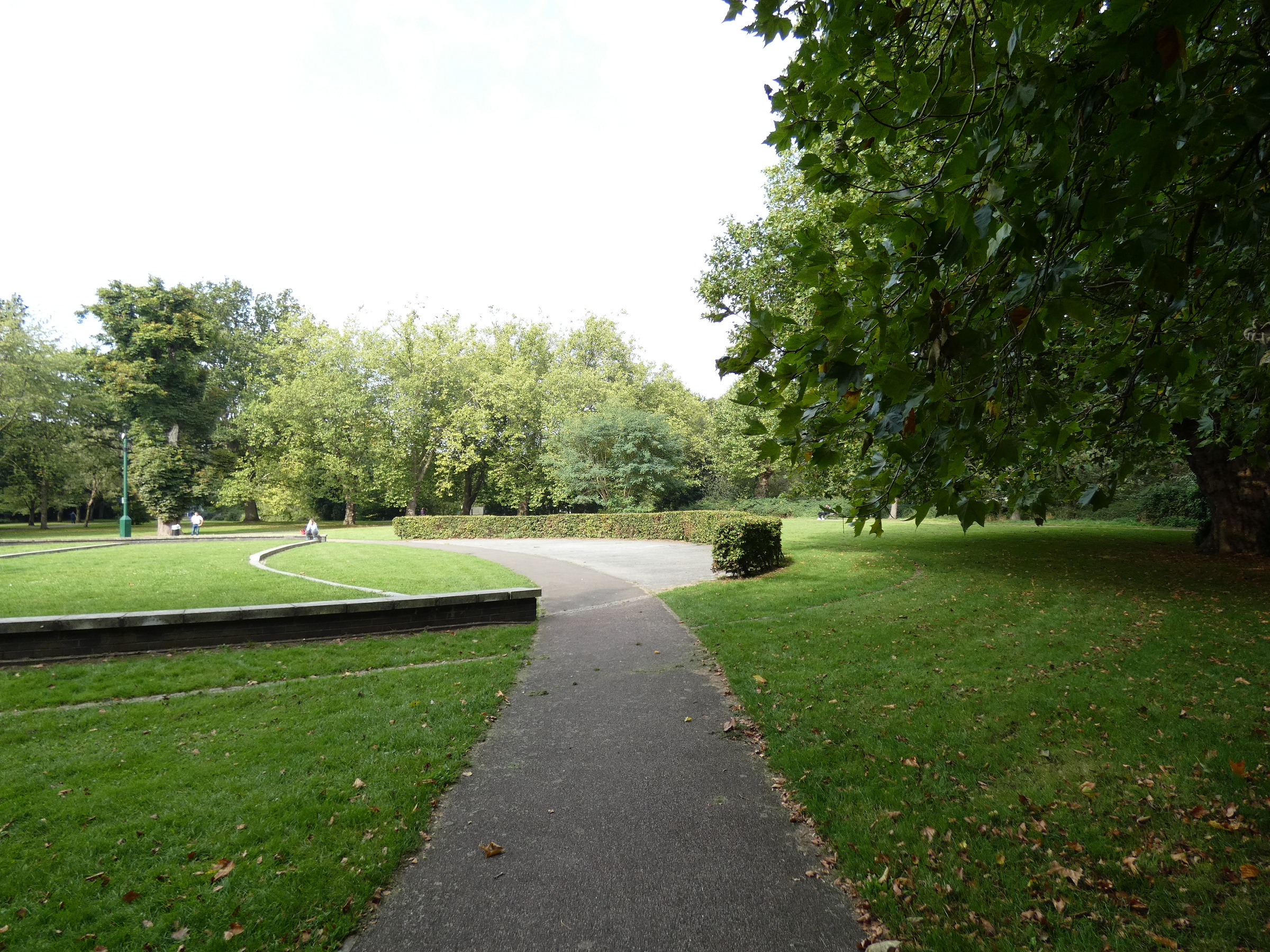
The amphitheatre at Pymmes Park

In recent years, the park has undergone major changes due mainly to the widening of the North Circular Road in the 1990s. An application to the Heritage Lottery Fund was successful and £2.8 million was granted for the restoration of the Victorian parkland in a scheme known as the Pymmes Park restoration project.

Pymmes Park lake has suffered from severe pollution for many years. In 2014, the London Borough of Enfield announced plans to create a wetland covering 4,000 square metres (43,000 sq ft) to improve the quality of the water entering the lake.

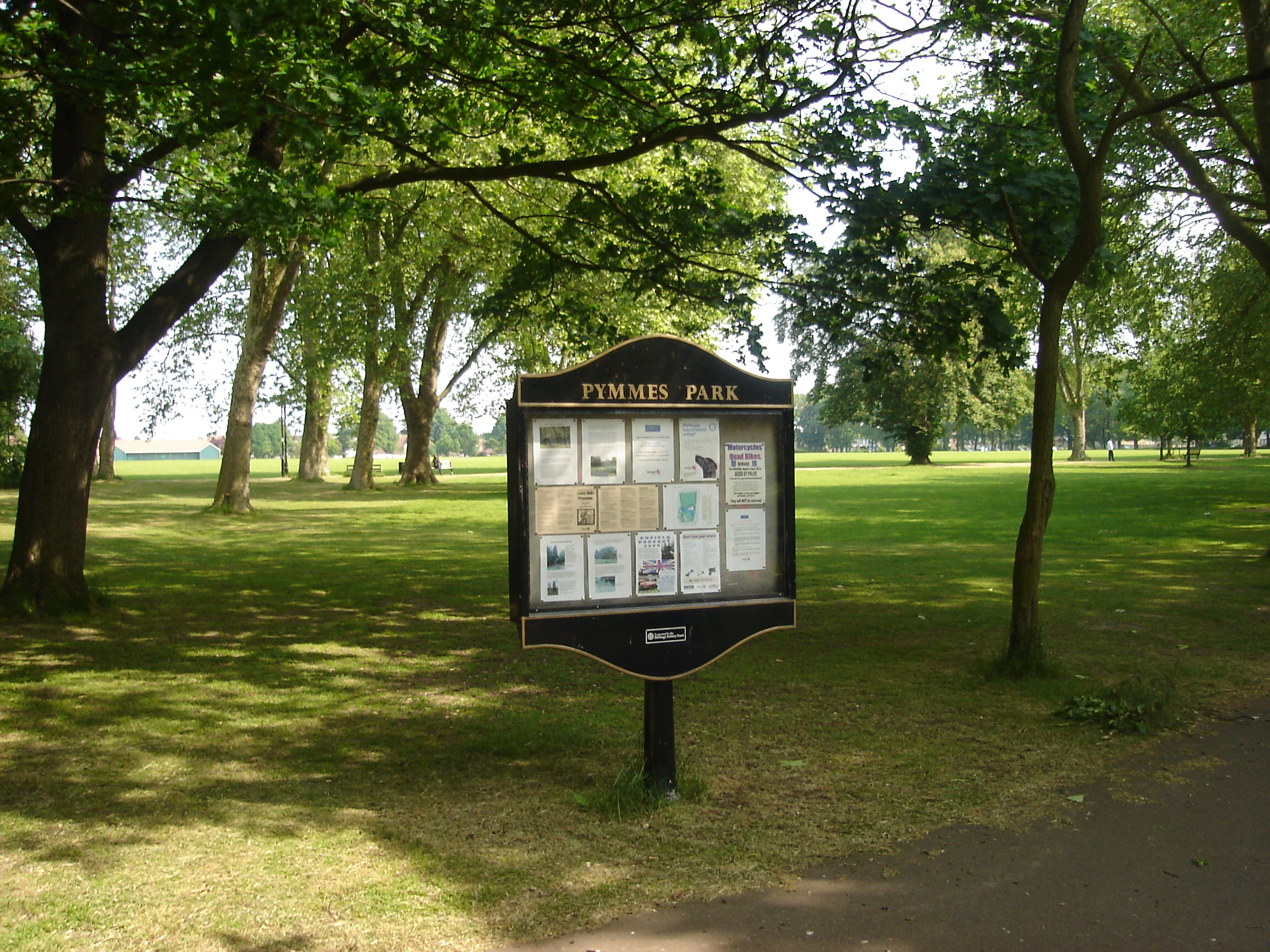
Playing fields

== Recreation ==
Facilities include a bowls club, tennis courts, multi-use games area, football pitches, children's playground, lake and ornamental pond. The Pymmes Brook Trail follows the approximate course of Pymmes Brook which flows through the park. Since 2011, a weekly 5 kilometres (3.1 miles) Parkrun is held in the park.

The park includes a memorial to John Alexander Christie VC.

== Public transport ==
Silver Street railway station on the London Overground's Weaver line is opposite the park, which is also served by London bus routes: 34, 102, 144, 149, 192, 259, 279, 349 and 444.
