= Hurst Cottage =

Coordinates: 51.6600°N 0.1913°W

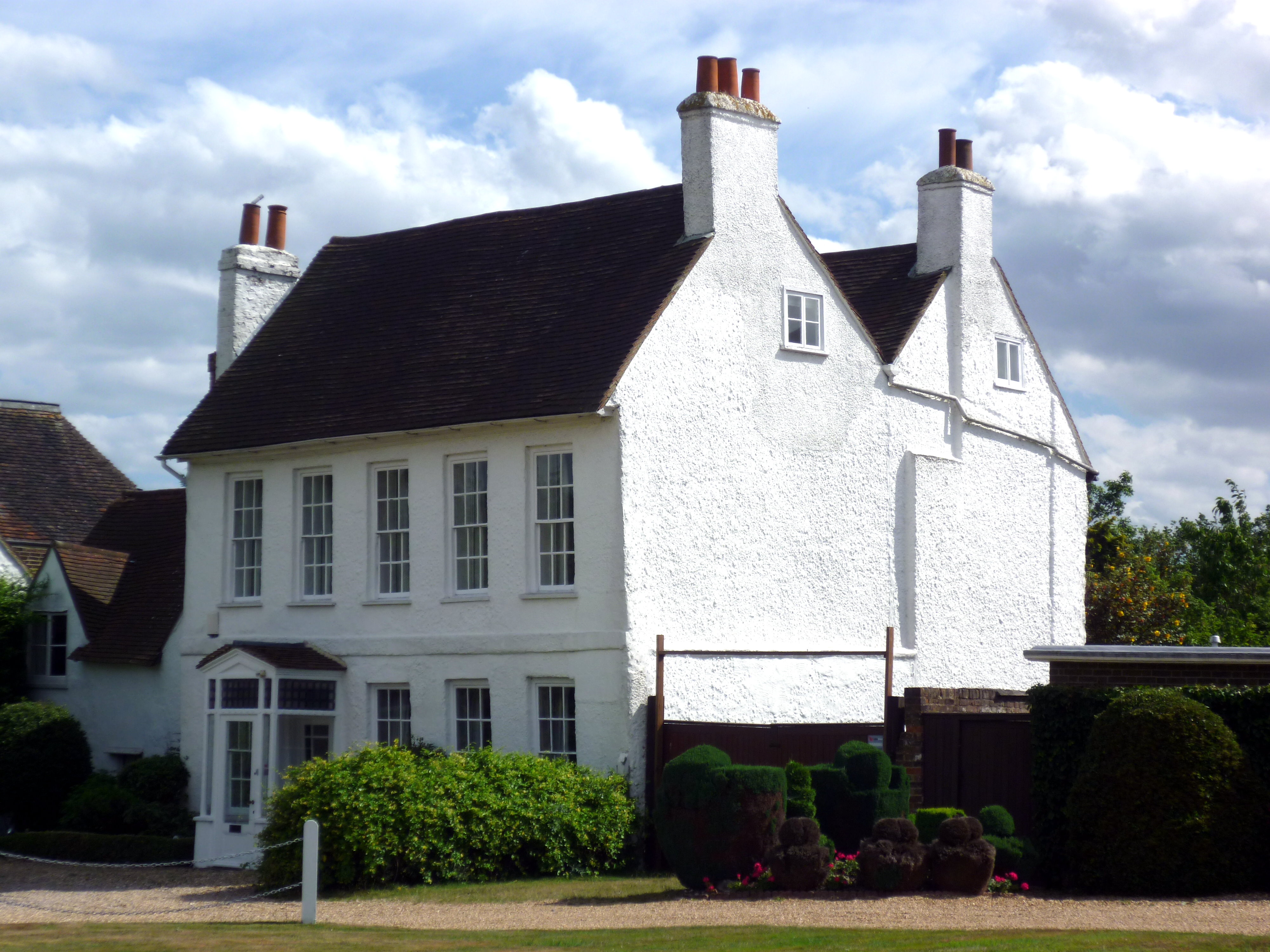
Hurst Cottage with its distinctive roof structure.

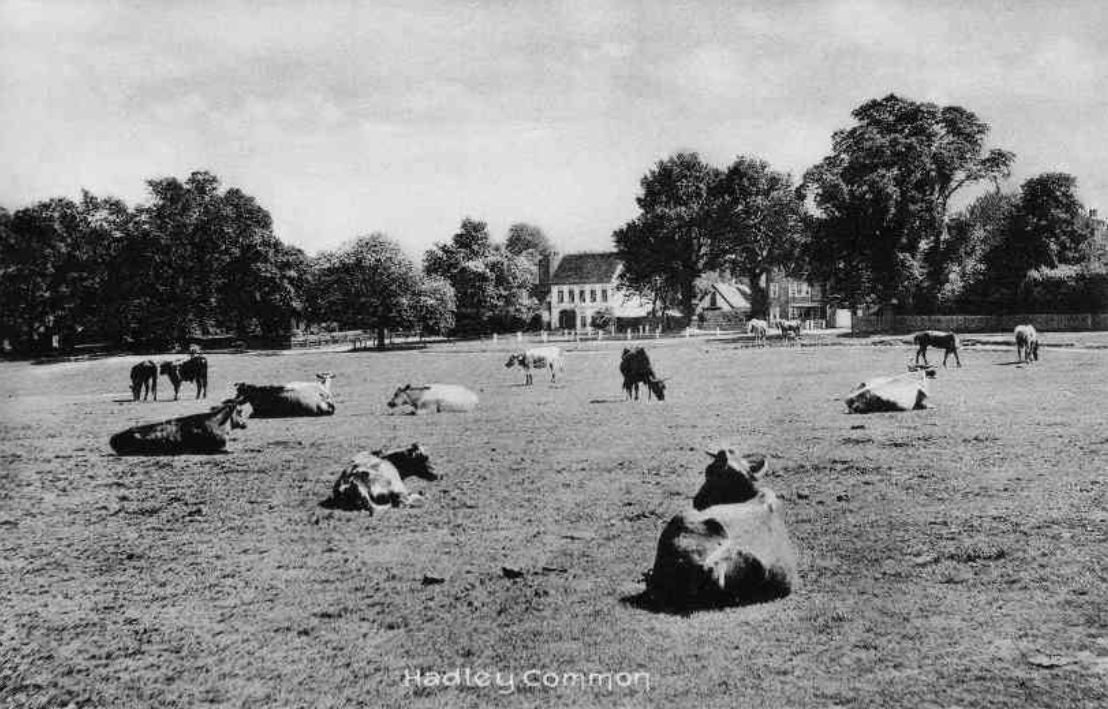
A 1911 (or earlier) postcard showing Monken Hadley Common and Hurst Cottage.

Hurst Cottage is a grade II listed building on Hadley Common Road, in Monken Hadley, north of Chipping Barnet. The building was completed in the late 17th or early 18th century and faces Monken Hadley Common. It was first listed in 1949, originally under the name Coach House Cottage.
