= Oak Hill Park (Barnet) =

Park in the London Borough of Barnet, England

Coordinates: 51.6378°N 0.1549°W

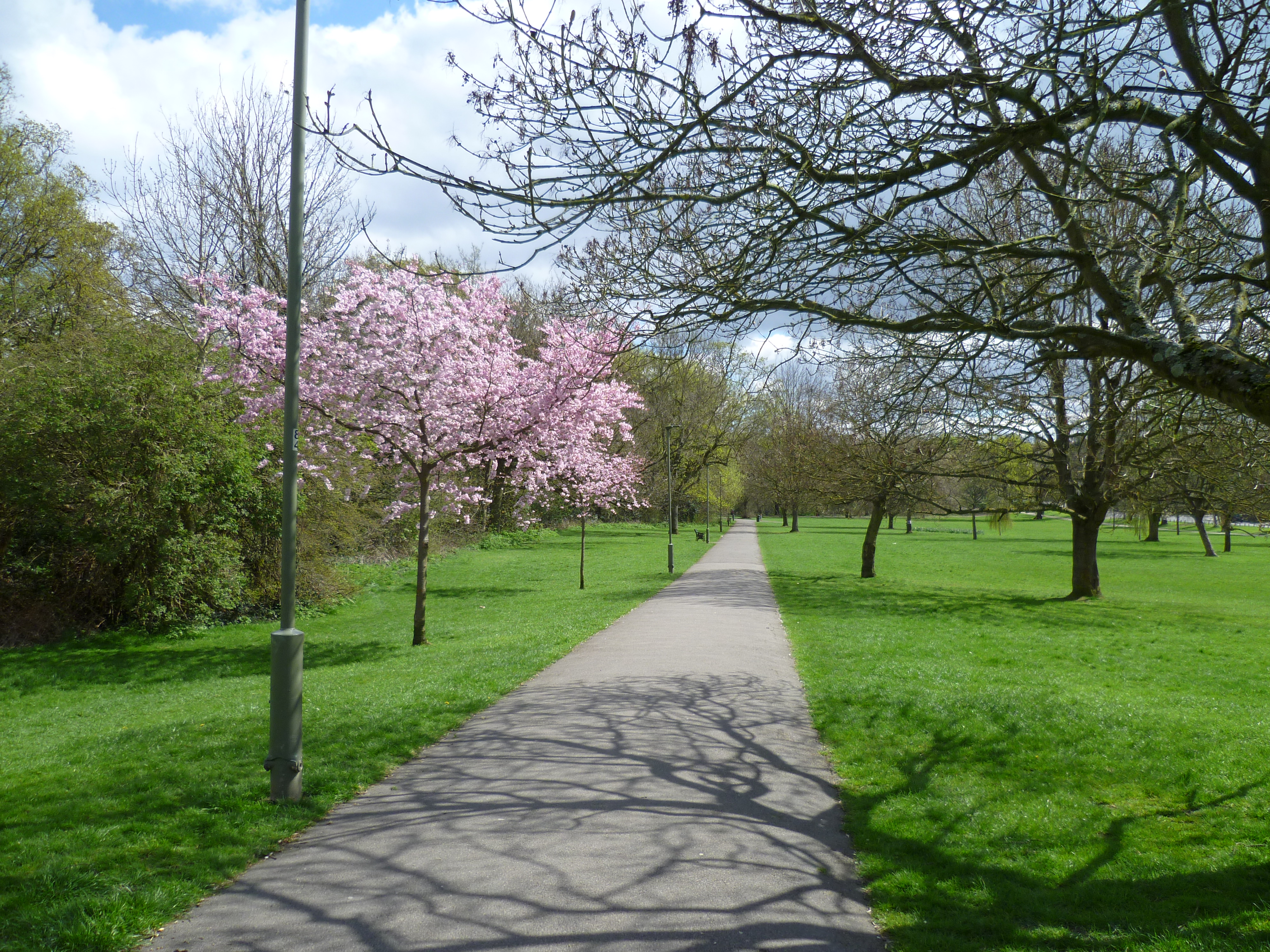
Oak Hill Park

Oak Hill Park is in East Barnet in the London Borough of Barnet. It is one of Barnet's premier parks and received a Green Flag Award for 2009–10. It is a large area of parkland with a wide range of facilities, including an outdoor gym, a bowls green, football pitches, a golf course, three tennis courts, a multi-sports court and a play area for toddlers.

Part of the park became Oak Hill Wood, a Local Nature Reserve in 1997. Pymme's Brook and Pymmes Brook Trail pass through the park.

Oak Hill Park has been part of Parkrun since August 2011

There is access from Church Hill Road, Parkside Gardens, Daneland and Vernon Crescent.

== History ==
Oak Hill dates back to at least the 11th century, as part of the Monkenfrith estate owned by the church. After the dissolution of the Monasteries it was sold in 1536–38 and remained in private ownership until the bulk of the estate – renamed Oak Hill in the late 18th century – was bought by East Barnet Council in 1930 following the death of its last owner Charles Edward Baring Young in 1928. Oak Hill House became the home of Oak Hill College, retaining some of the grounds, while the remainder became Oak Hill Park, established in 1933; The adjacent Monkfrith House existed until demolition in 1937, when the south-east corner of the estate was developed for housing. A monument to Sir Simon Haughton Clarke, owner of Oak Hill in the early 18th Century, stands in the cemetery of St Mary's Church, on the opposite side of the park.

== Gallery ==
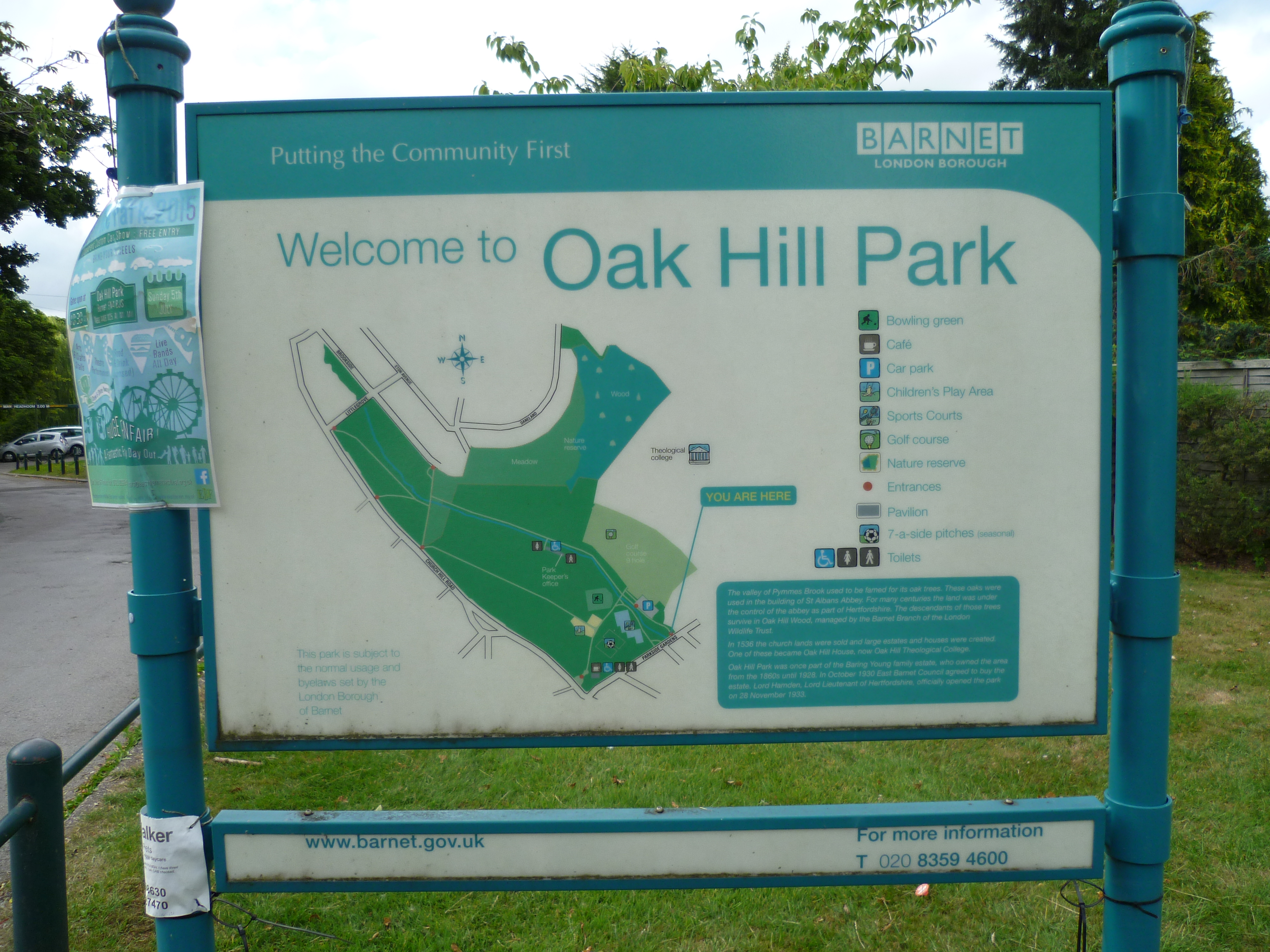
Map of the park.

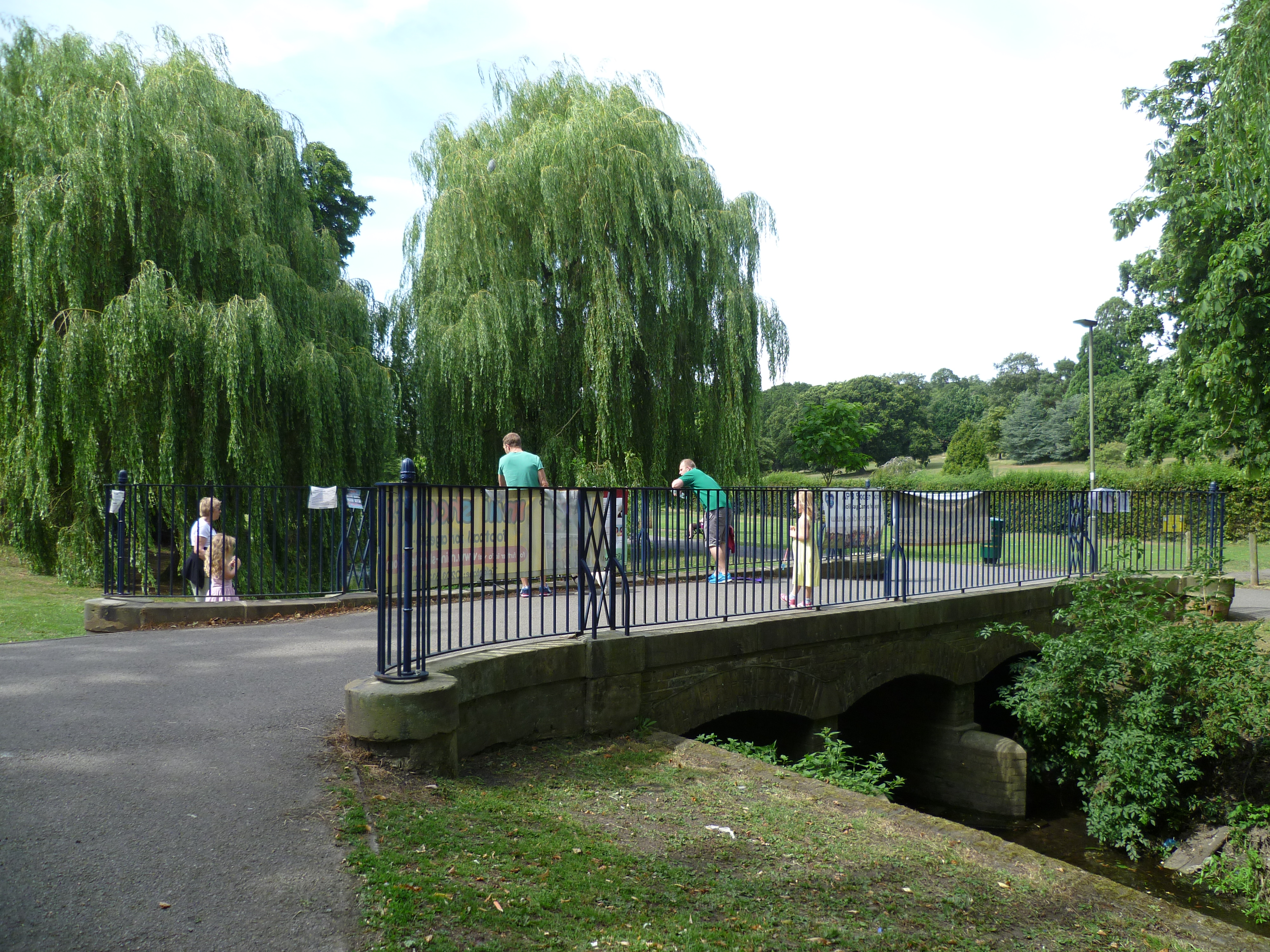
Bridge over Pymme's Brook

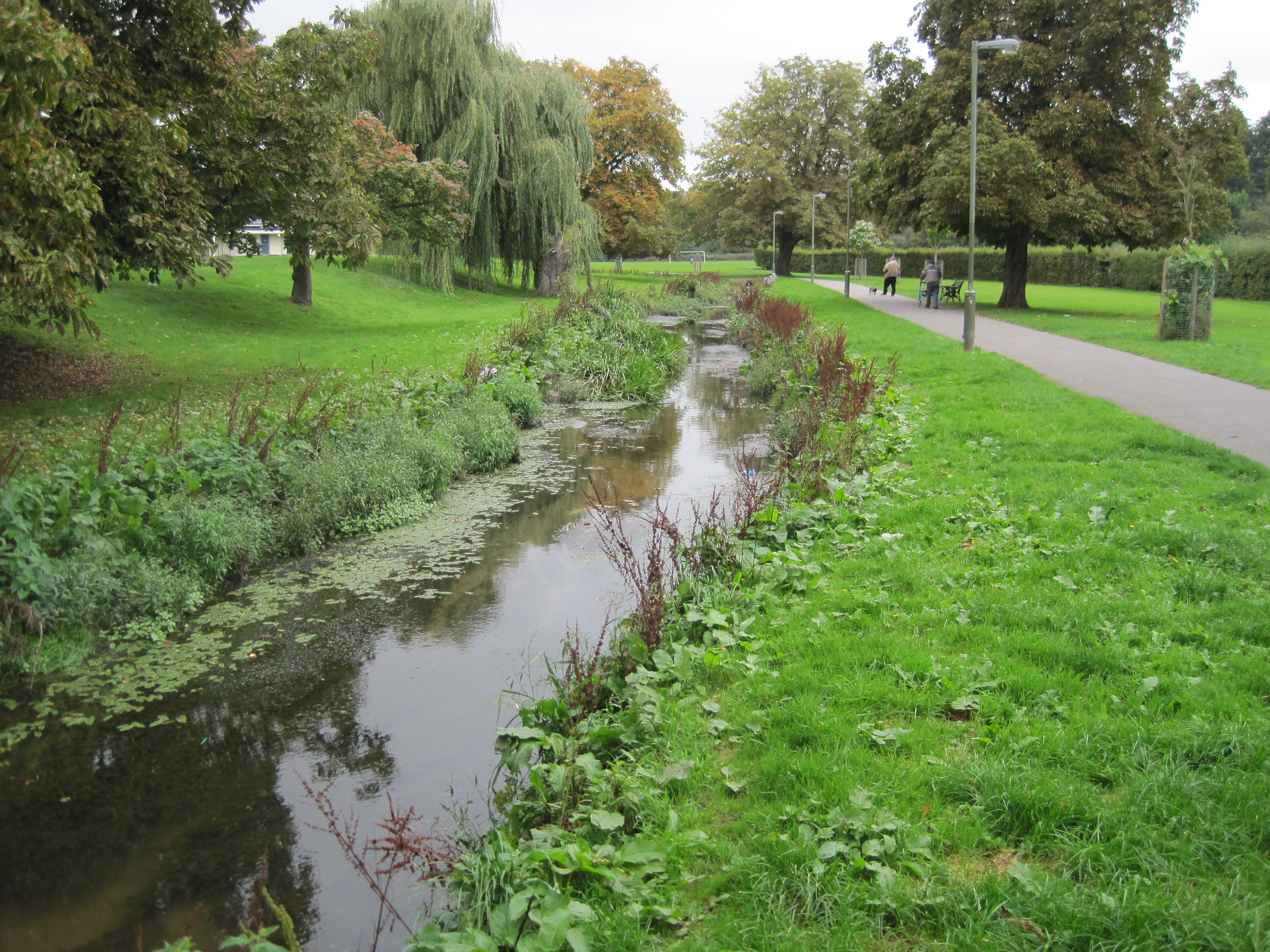
Pymme's Brook

== See also ==
- Barnet parks and open spaces
- Nature reserves in Barnet
