= Pymmes Brook =

River in north London

Coordinates: 51.637927°N 0.154796°W

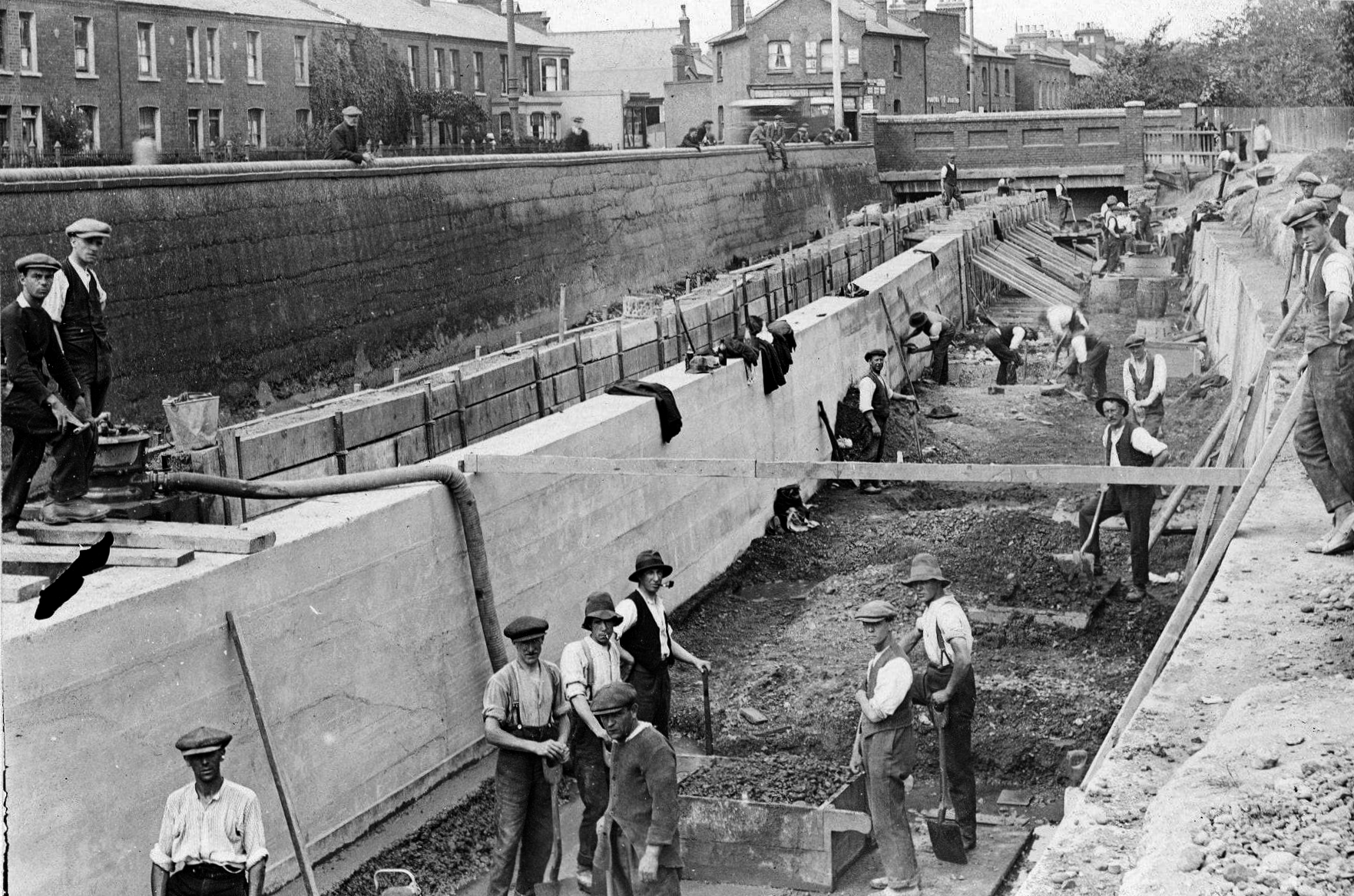
Culverting of Pymmes Brook beside Angel Road as part of the construction of the North Circular Road, 1921 (Note: The photograph is looking west from a point south of Glasgow Road towards the bridge carrying Edinburgh Road across Pymmes Brook; see https://maps.nls.uk/view/103657610)

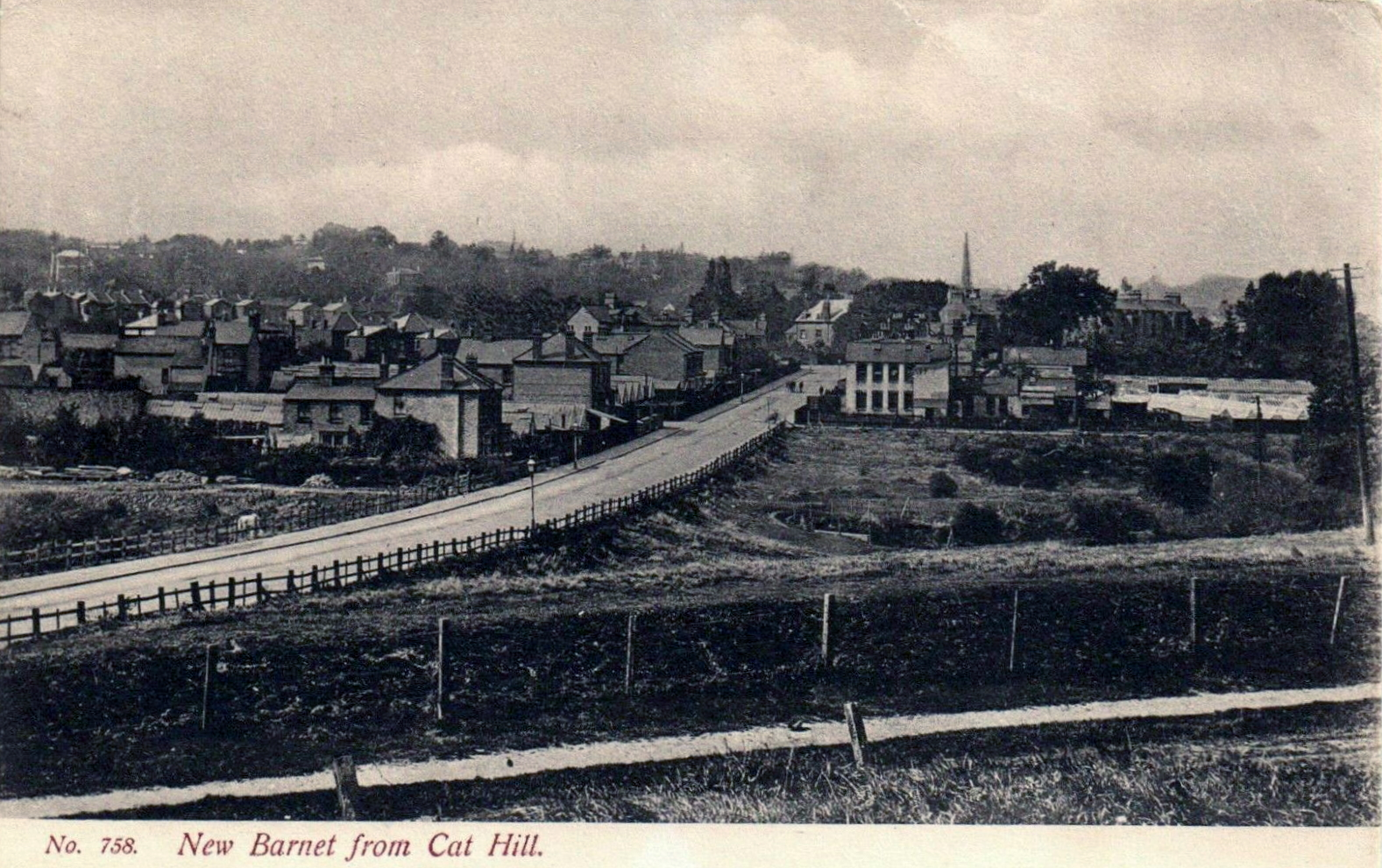
Pymmes Brook from Cat Hill looking down Brookhill Road 1908

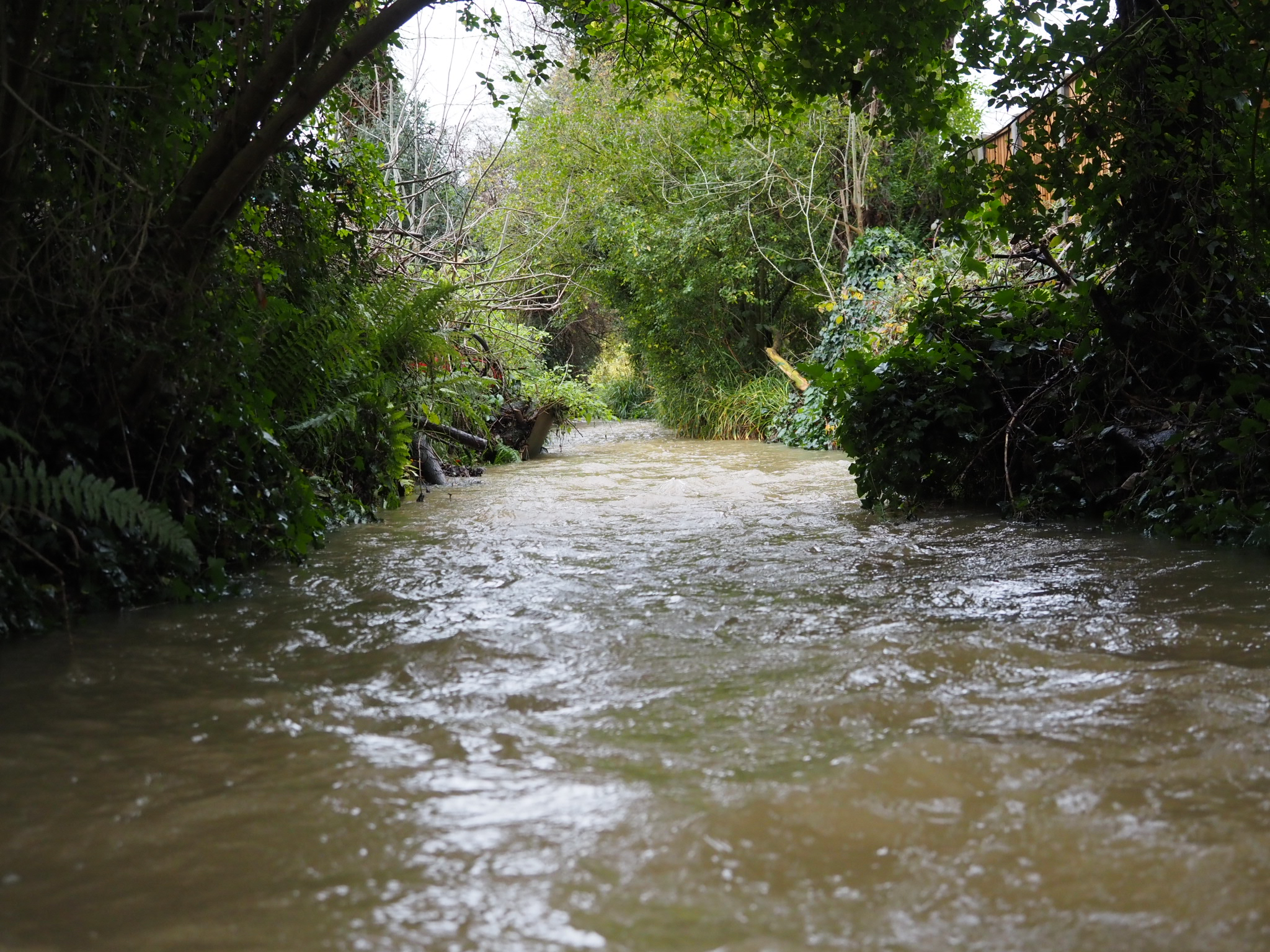
Pymmes Brook parallel to Crescent Road in 2021

Pymmes Brook is located in North London and named after William Pymme, a local landowner. It is a minor tributary of the River Lea. The brook mostly flows through urban areas and is particularly prone to flooding in its lower reaches. To alleviate the problem the brook has been culverted in many areas. Part of it is a Site of Borough Importance for Nature Conservation, Grade II. The Pymmes BrookERS community group works to improve the health of the river and its tributaries.

== Course ==
The source of the brook are underground springs at Hadley Common which are mentioned in reference to the penultimate battle in the Wars of the Roses at the Battle of Barnet. At this point it is known as Monken Mead Brook before flowing in a south-easterly direction to merge with the River Lee Navigation at Tottenham. It flows through East Barnet, where it is joined by a small tributary, the Shirebourne brook before flowing through New Southgate, Arnos Grove, Palmers Green and Edmonton. After flowing through Pymmes Park the brook can be seen at Fore Street, Edmonton before it flows in a culvert under Angel Road. It emerges beneath the North Circular Road flyover to the east of Albany Road and is then joined by Salmons Brook. The brook then flows parallel with the River Lee Navigation in Tottenham Marshes until it merges with the Lea near Ferry Lane A503 and Tottenham Lock.

== Geology, origin and evolution ==
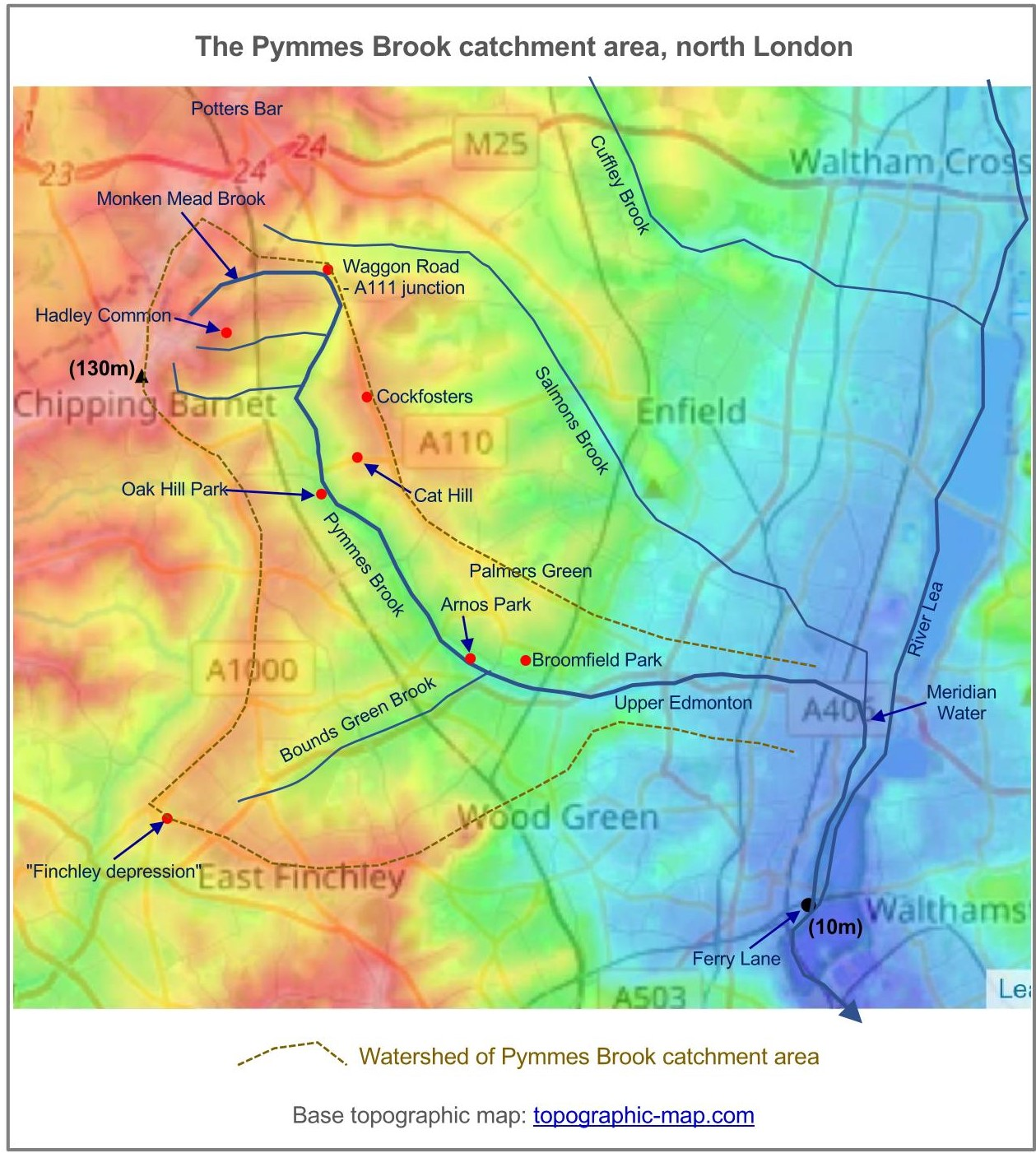
Topographic map of the Pymmes Brook catchment area, north London

The main geological formation underlying the Pymmes Brook catchment area is Eocene London Clay. The uppermost part of this formation - the "Claygate Beds" - has a higher sand content. In some parts of the higher sections of the catchment area, the London Clay is overlain by "Stanmore Gravel" (also known as "Pebble Gravel") and "Dollis Hill Gravel" (both Quaternary pre-glacial fluvial deposits), and by Quaternary glacial till. From Oak Hill Park southwards, there are sand, gravel and alluvium deposits on the Pymmes Brook valley floor. And east of Palmers Green, the brook crosses extensive Quaternary river terrace deposits laid down by the River Lea.

As a west bank tributary of the lower River Lea, Pymmes Brook came into being about 400,000 years ago, after the Anglian glaciation. During that glaciation, ice from the north of England advanced at least as far south as Watford, Finchley and Chingford.

Until the Anglian glaciation, the River Thames flowed north-eastwards via Watford, through what is now the Vale of St Albans, then eastwards towards Chelmsford and the North Sea. As a result of the glaciation, the Thames was diverted to a more southerly route, broadly along the line of its current course.

Prior to the Anglian glaciation, a "proto-Mole-Wey" river was flowing northwards from the Weald and North Downs, through the "Finchley depression" and Palmers Green, to join the proto-Thames somewhere around Hoddesdon, at what is today an altitude of around 60 metres. It was this river which, during the course of the early and middle Pleistocene, deposited the "Dollis Hill Gravel" at successive altitudes.

When the Anglian ice sheet diverted the Thames southwards, the Mole-Wey was cut off at Richmond. Meltwater from the retreating Anglian ice sheet gave birth to a south-flowing lower River Lea, and that river cut into and followed in part the line of the former proto-Mole-Wey. It flowed into the newly diverted Thames, which at that time was spread over a wide flood plain extending as far north as Islington.

And, as the ice sheet retreated, west bank tributaries of the lower Lea, such as Pymmes Brook, flowed eastwards and south-eastwards from higher ground running roughly south–north through Potters Bar, down towards the newly formed lower River Lea. They (and their own tributaries such as Bounds Green Brook) cut down successively through till left by the ice sheet, then through "Dollis Hill Gravel", and then into Eocene London Clay below.

It is not known at present whether Pymmes Brook, and other west bank tributaries such as Salmons Brook and Cuffley Brook, followed valleys which had been in existence before the ice sheet covered the land, or whether they fashioned a substantially different landscape after the ice retreated. But it is known that today's tributaries of the upper Lea, such as the Rivers Mimram and Stort, follow broadly the same lines as pre-glaciation valleys, so, by analogy, it is quite possible that elements at least of the pre-glaciation topography of the lower Lea basin are reflected in today's relief.

In the case of Pymmes Brook immediately after the glaciation, that stream joined the River Lea somewhere around Broomfield Park, where there is a deposit of "Boyn Hill Gravel". That gravel, which is on the highest of the river terraces left by the post-Anglian lower River Lea, marks the line followed by the Lea after the retreat of the ice sheet.

During the course of the following 400,000 years, the lower Lea moved steadily eastwards, leaving river terrace deposits of decreasing age and altitude as it did so, as well as a relatively steep eastern slope. (This eastward shift has been attributed to an underlying monocline.) Pymmes Brook thus extended its course eastwards from Broomfield Park, across the valley floor of the lower Lea, through Upper Edmonton, to Meridian Water.

From Cockfosters down to Arnos Park, Pymmes Brook, like the lower River Lea, has a notably steep eastern slope. Associated with that is the fact that almost all the tributaries of that section of Pymmes Brook are on its west side. So it is possible that that section of the brook has, like the lower River Lea, also shifted eastwards somewhat since the Anglian glaciation (and, if so, presumably for the same reason).

In addition, that section of the Pymmes Brook valley today seems disproportionately deep for such a small stream – for example, at Cat Hill. But we are currently in an interglacial period, and the stream would have been flowing more strongly than today at times of "high discharge, under cold climatic conditions". And, at such times, soil cover and vegetation would have been much thinner than today, thus facilitating greater erosion. Furthermore, as the River Lea itself cut down as it moved eastwards, it lowered the base level of its tributary stream, Pymmes Brook. That would have enabled the brook to become further incised into the higher ground to the west of the Lea flood plain.

The drainage pattern in this area continues to evolve. For example, the pronounced wind gap at the junction of Waggon Road and the A111, where Monken Mead Brook turns sharply to the south to become the upper part of Pymmes Brook, indicates that Monken Mead Brook once continued eastwards as a tributary of Salmons Brook. It has been captured by Pymmes Brook in the recent geological past.

== Parks ==
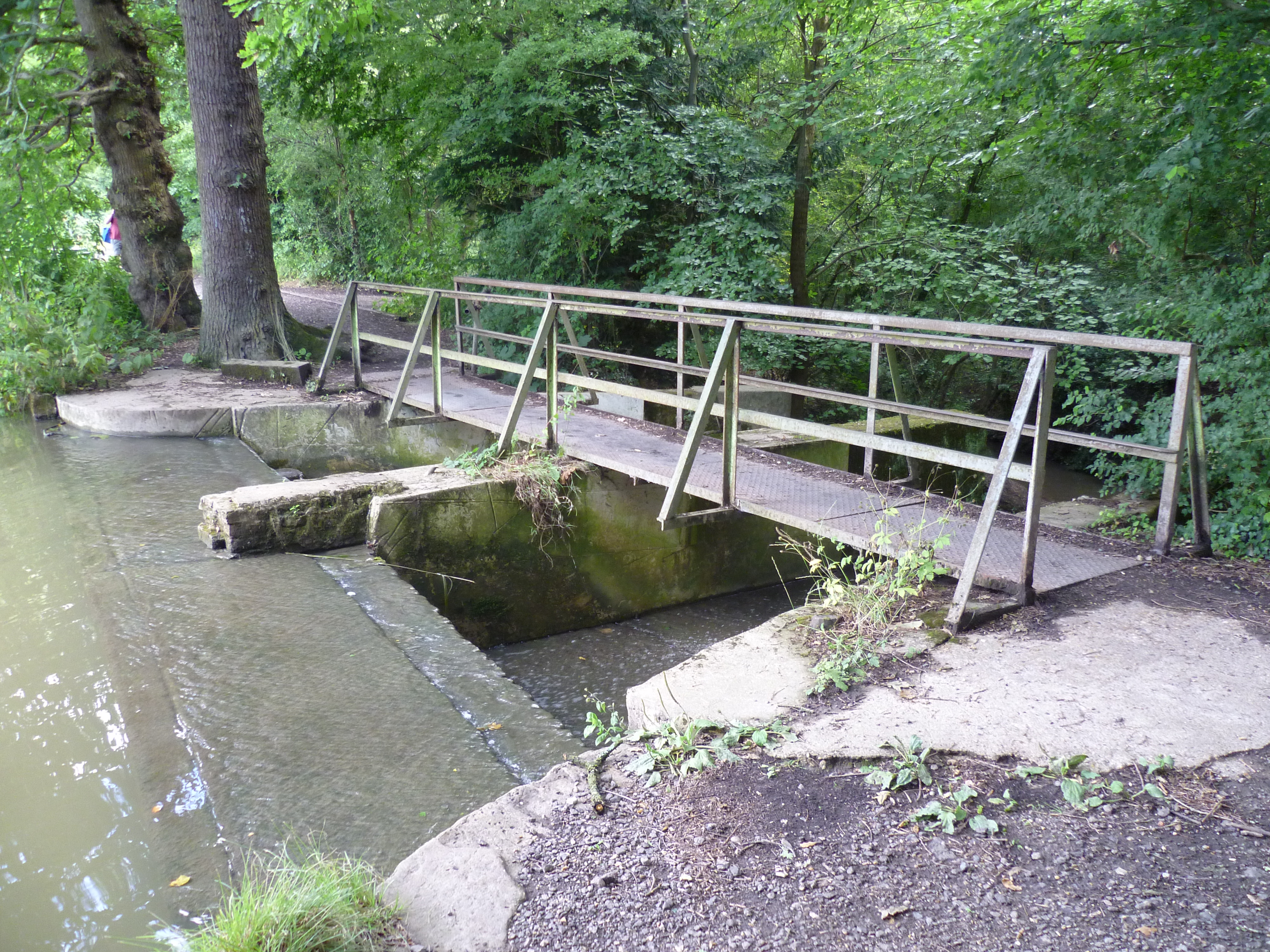
The weir at the south of Jack's Lake at Monken Hadley Common where Pymmes Brook was dammed.

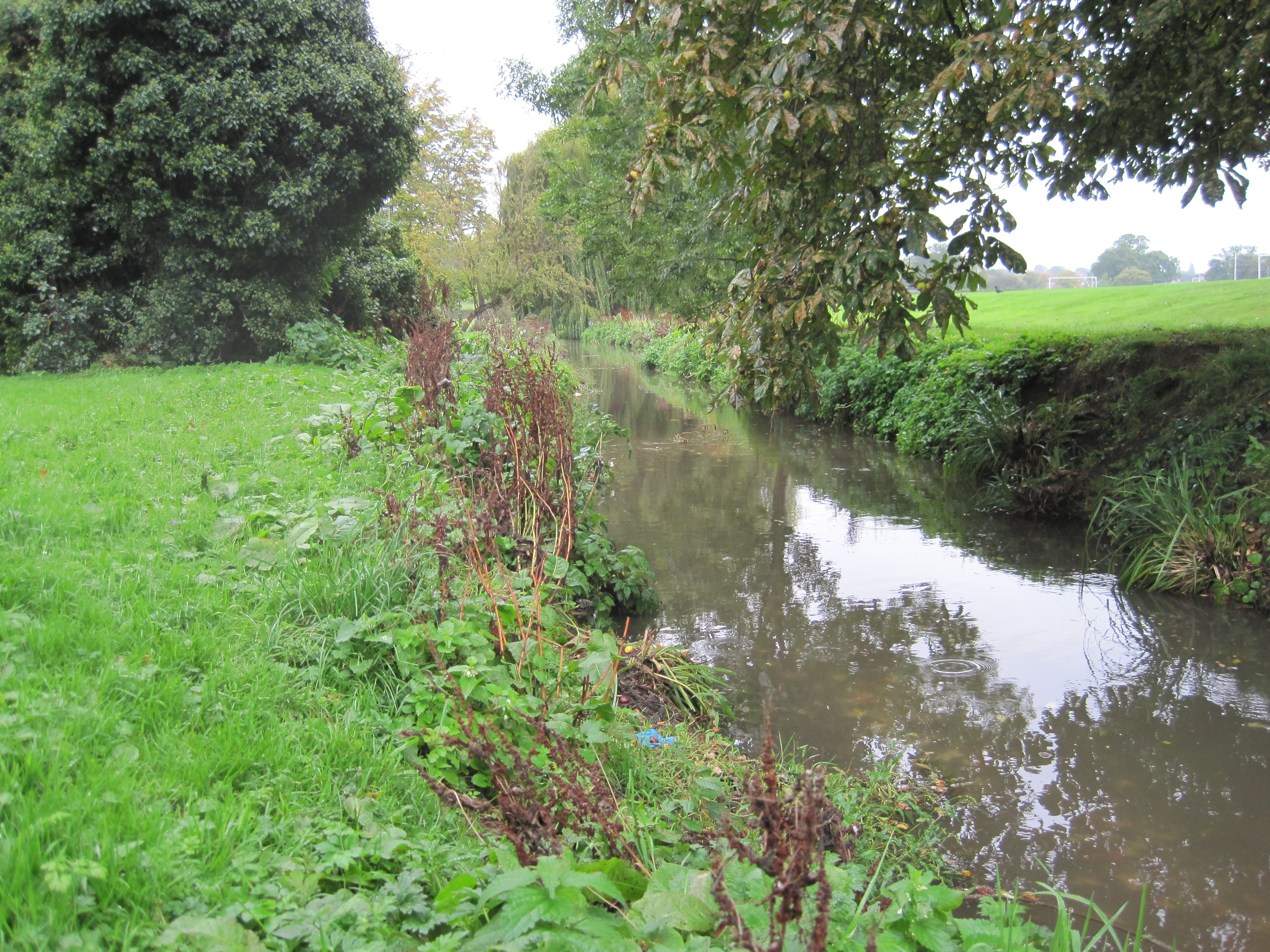
Pymme's Brook in Oak Hill Park, East Barnet

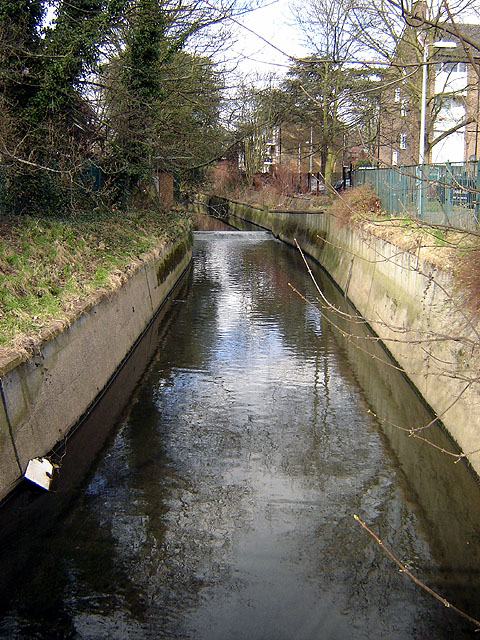
Pymmes Brook at Fore Street, Edmonton

The brook can be seen in the following larger parks:

- Arnos Park
- Pymmes Park
- Oak Hill Park
- Brunswick Park

It also flows through a number of other open spaces, smaller parks, and greens.

== Walking ==
The new, extended route of the Pymmes Brook Trail starts where the brook's headwaters rise on Hadley Green then follows its approximate course to its confluence with the River Lea at Tottenham Hale, where the trail joins the Lea Valley Walk.

== History ==
The brook is marked thus on the Ordnance Survey map of 1877. In c.1200 it was called Medeseye, that is, ' meadow marsh-stream ' from Old English mæd and sæge ,

During the Middle Ages, it was known as the Medesenge, in the late 17th century as Millicents brook then, by the late 18th century as Bell brook.

== Water quality ==
Pymmes Brook receives most of its water from urban run-off as overland flow or via surface water drains and combined sewage outfalls (CSOs). There is some overflow from Jacks (Beechhill) lake. Jacks Lake burst its banks in the 1930s causing flooding in East Barnet with glasshouses and cows carried downstream. Following on from this event the banks and the first part of the channel was heavily reinforced with concrete. Water quality parameters are indicative of a high level of pollution, in particular, there are areas with misconnections resulting in very high levels of fecal coliforms. Cat Hill for instance often exceeds 1 million colony forming units of Escherichia coli per 100 mLs of water. Macroinvertebrate families are good indicators of organic loading and both the BMWP scores and the more recent WHPT biotic index scores are very low, compared with a clean chalk stream like the River Mimram which has a biotic index of around 210. The best scoring area of the brook (close to the headwaters) has never gone above 32. Channel sediments are also heavily contaminated particularly with heavy metals, lead, zinc, copper, and cadmium are all extremely high.

== See also ==
- Nature reserves in Barnet
