= Thomas Wilson (rhetorician) =

English statesman and rhetorician (1524–1581)

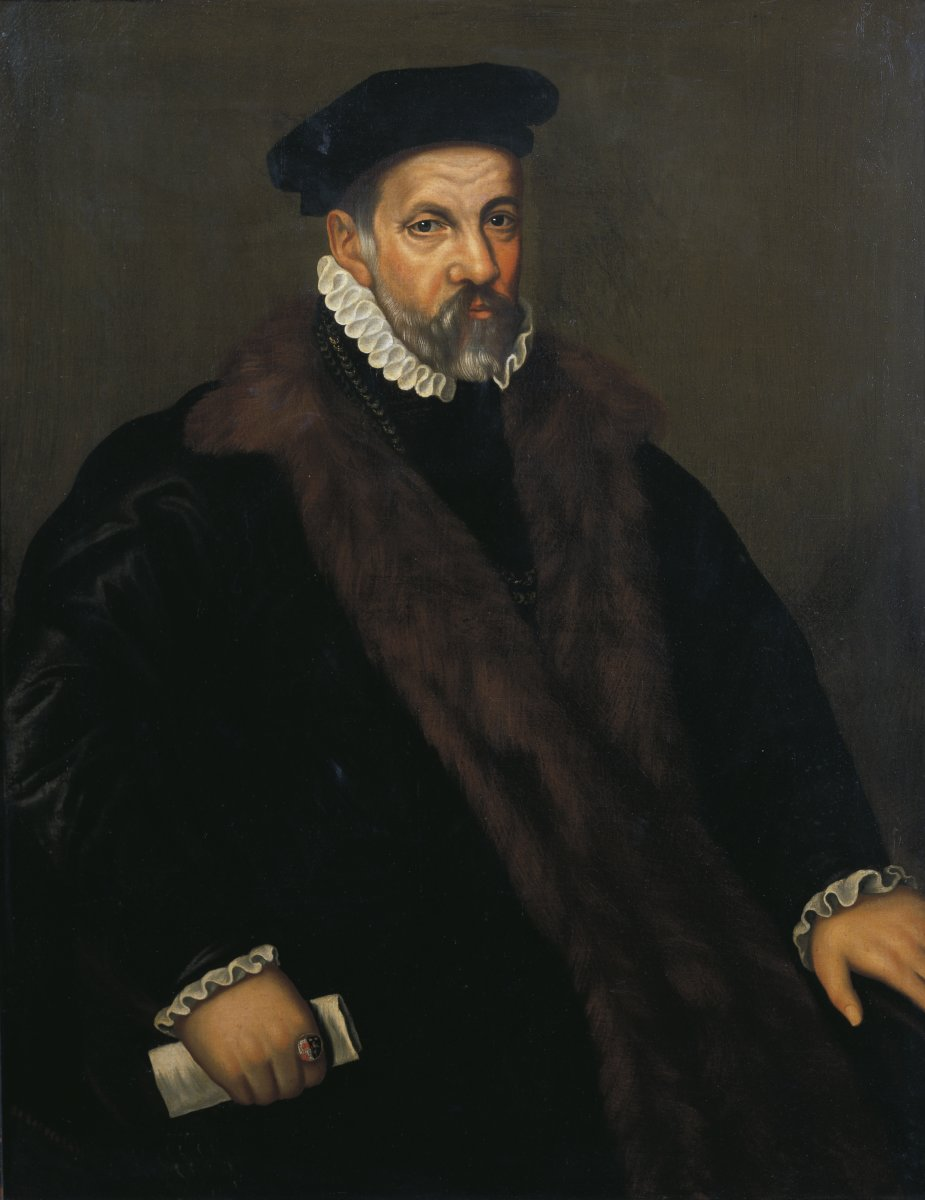
Thomas Wilson, Esquire

Thomas Wilson (1524–1581), Esquire, LL.D., was an English diplomat and judge who served as a privy councillor and Secretary of State (1577–81) to Queen Elizabeth I. He is remembered especially for his Logique (1551) and The Arte of Rhetorique (1553), which have been called "the first complete works on logic and rhetoric in English".

He also wrote A Discourse upon Usury by way of Dialogue and Orations (1572), and he was the first to publish a translation of Demosthenes into English.

== Life ==
He was the son of Thomas Wilson, a farmer, of Strubby, Lincolnshire. He was educated at Eton College under Nicholas Udall, and at King's College, Cambridge, where he joined the school of Hellenists to which John Cheke, Thomas Smith, Walter Haddon and others belonged. He graduated B.A. in 1546, and M.A. in 1549.

Wilson was an intellectual companion to the sons of John Dudley, 1st Duke of Northumberland, especially with John, Ambrose, and Robert Dudley. When the Dudley family fell from power in 1553, he fled to the Continent. He was with Sir John Cheke in Padua in 1555–1557, and afterwards at Rome, whither in 1558 Queen Mary wrote, ordering him to return to England to stand his trial as a heretic. He refused to come home, but was arrested by the Roman Inquisition and tortured. He escaped, and fled to Ferrara, but in 1560 he was once more in London.

Wilson became Master of Requests and Master of St Katherine's Hospital in the Tower in 1561 and entered parliament in January 1563 as MP for Mitchell, Cornwall. In 1571 and 1572 he was elected MP for London.

From 1574 to 1577, Wilson, who had now become a prominent person in the diplomatic world, was principally engaged on embassies to the Low Countries, and on his return to England he was made a privy councillor and sworn secretary of state; Francis Walsingham was his colleague. In 1580, despite his being not in holy orders, Queen Elizabeth appointed Wilson Dean of Durham. He died at St Katherine's Hospital on 16 June 1581, and was buried next day, "without charge or pomp", at his express wish.

An inventory made in 1581 includes the furnishings of his estate Pymmes in Edmonton survives and was transcribed and published in 1957.

== Works ==
In 1551 Wilson produced, with Walter Haddon, a Latin life of Henry Brandon, 2nd Duke of Suffolk and his brother Charles Brandon, 3rd Duke of Suffolk. His earliest work of importance was The Rule of Reason, conteinynge the Arte of Logique set forth in Englishe (1551), which was frequently reprinted. It has been considered a derivative work, in English, of the Dialectica of John Seton which was circulated as a Latin manuscript before its publication.

It has been maintained that the book on which Wilson's fame mainly rests, The Arte of Rhetorique, was printed about the same time, but this is probably an error: the first edition extant is dated January 1553. It is the earliest systematic work of rhetoric and literary criticism existing in the English language.

The Arte of Rhetorique gives Wilson a place among the earliest exponents of English style. He was opposed to pedantry of phrase, and above all to a revival of uncouth medieval forms of speech, and encouraged a simpler manner of prose writing than was generally appreciated in the middle of the 16th century. He was also opposed to "inkhorn terms"—borrowings and coinages from Greek and Latin—which he found affected.

In 1570 Wilson published a translation, the first attempted in English, of the Olynthiacs and Philippics of Demosthenes, on which he had been engaged since 1556. His Discourse upon Usury, which he dedicated to Robert Dudley, Earl of Leicester, his patron and former pupil, appeared in 1572.

== Family ==
In his will proved in 1582, Thomas Wilson refers to his brother Godfrey Wilson of Durham, and calls Sir William Wynter his brother-in-law. He also had brothers Humphrey and William in Lincolnshire. He was first married to Agnes Wynter (sister of William Wynter), widow of William Broke of Ham in Essex: Broke died in 1562. Agnes died in 1574. Wilson names one son and two daughters who were born of this marriage:

- Nicholas Wilson (executor); of Sheepwash, Lincolnshire.
- Mary Wilson (in minority and unmarried, 1581); married (1) Robert Burdett of Bramcote, Warwickshire (died 1603), and (2) Sir Christopher Lowther of Lowther, Westmorland.
- Lucrece Wilson (in minority and unmarried, 1581); married Sir George Belgrave, of Belgrave, Leicester.

Sir Francis Walsingham, Sir William Wynter and Mathewe Smyth Esquire were appointed overseers to Wilson's will.

According to the Visitations of Essex, Wilson made a late marriage to Jane, widow of John Pynchon of Writtle, Essex, which is shown in the parish registers of Terling (Essex) at 15 July 1576. The Visitations identify her as a daughter of Sir Richard Empson. P.W. Hasler states that Jane died in 1577, which would account for her not being mentioned in Thomas Wilson's will of 1582. However the register copy of Jane Wilson's will suggests it was written in 1587 and proved in 1588. Both John Pynchon's and Jane Wilson's wills indicate a near relationship to Peter Osborne: possibly Jane was first the widow of Osborne's brother John, of Latchingdon, Essex, who had died in 1553.

== Notes ==
Political offices
Preceded by Sir Francis Walsingham	Secretary of State; 1577–1581; With: Sir Francis Walsingham	Succeeded by Sir Francis Walsingham
