= Pulhamite =

Material simulating natural stone

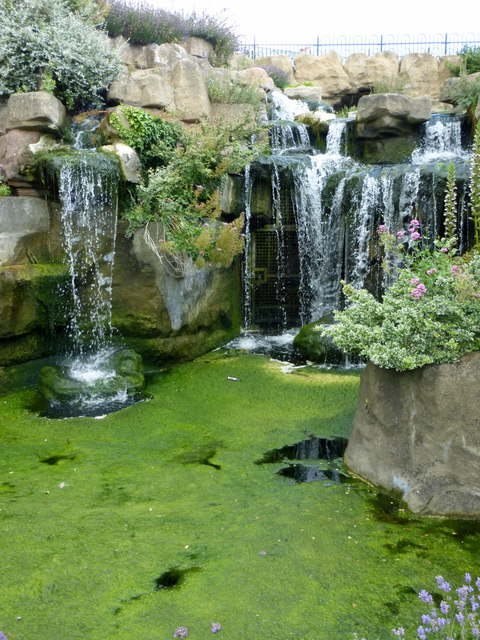
Waterfall in Albion Place Gardens, Ramsgate

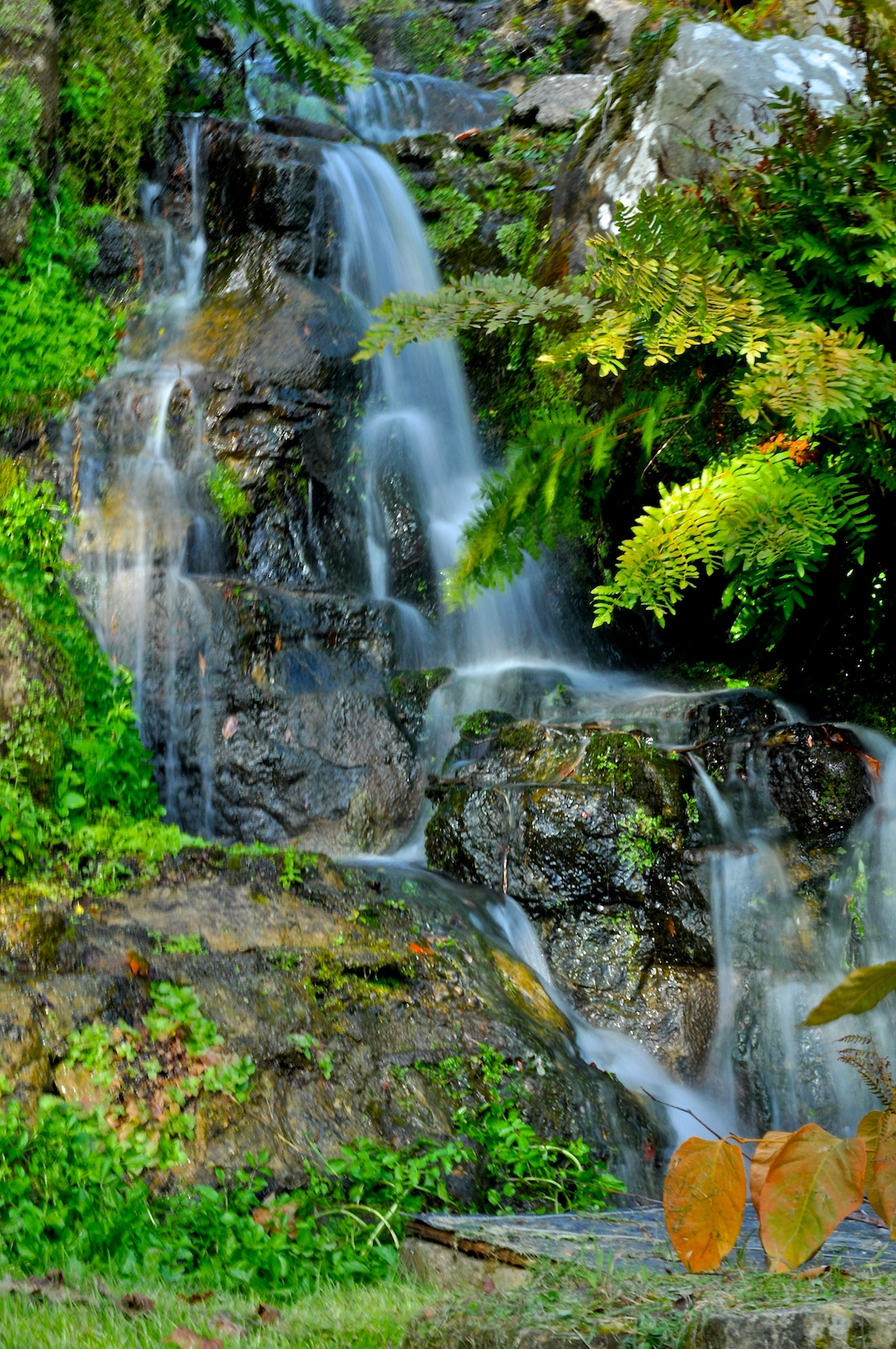
Pulham Falls, Sheffield Park Garden

Pulhamite was a patented anthropic rock material invented by James Pulham (1820–1898) of the firm James Pulham and Son of Broxbourne in Hertfordshire. It was widely used for rock gardens and grottos.

== Overview ==
Pulhamite, which usually looked like gritty sandstone, was used to join natural rocks together or crafted to simulate natural stone features. It was so realistic that it fooled some geologists of the era. The recipe went to the grave with the inventor. Modern analysis of surviving original Pulhamite has shown it to be a blend of sand, Portland cement and clinker sculpted over a core of rubble and crushed bricks. It can be viewed in these places:

- Dane Park, Margate
- Neo-Norman gatehouse and folly at Benington Lordship in Hertfordshire
- Rockery, Burslem Park
- Cascade and Rock Garden, Ramsgate,
- Courtstairs Chine, Ramsgate,
- Garden Folly, Sydenham Hill Wood, Sydenham, London.
- Grottoes at Dewstow Gardens, South Wales
- Dunorlan Park, Tunbridge Wells
- Felixstowe Spa and Winter Garden, Suffolk
- Fernery and waterfall, Bromley Palace Park, Bromley
- Grotto, Wotton House, Surrey
- Water course and pump tower, The Dell, Englefield Green
- Henley Hall, Shropshire
- Lake and rockery, Milton Mount Gardens, Crawley
- Leonardslee, rockery in Grade I listed garden at Lower Beeding, West Sussex, England.
- Newstead Abbey fernery, Nottinghamshire
- Rock Cliff, Bawdsey Manor, Suffolk
- Water Garden, Highnam Court, Gloucester
- Zig-zag Path, Lower Leas Coastal Park, Folkestone
- Rosshall Park, Glasgow
- Gardens at Waddesdon Manor, Buckinghamshire
- Heythrop Park, Oxfordshire
- Fernery at Danesbury Park, Hertfordshire.
- Waterfall at Battersea Park, London.
- Madresfield Court and gardens, Worcestershire
- Gardens at Coombe Wood, Croydon.
- Artificial stone mouldings in West Hyde church, Hertfordshire.
- Colney Hall near Norwich
- Cliffs at North Shore, Blackpool
- Former Terraced Gardens, Rivington, Lancashire.
- Holly Hill Woodland Park, Fareham.

== Gallery ==
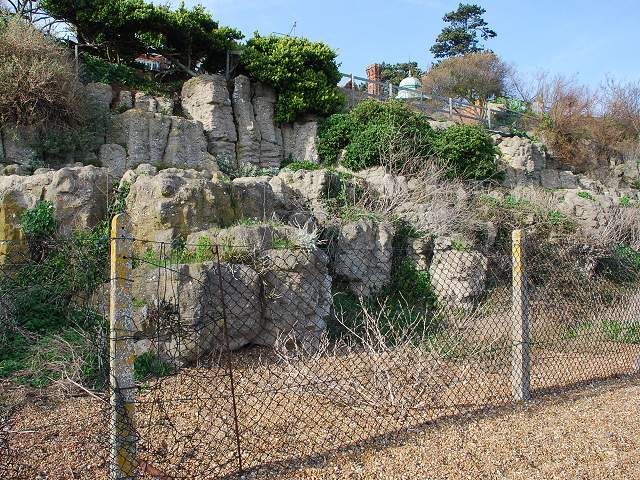
Pulhamite cliff walk at Bawdsey Manor

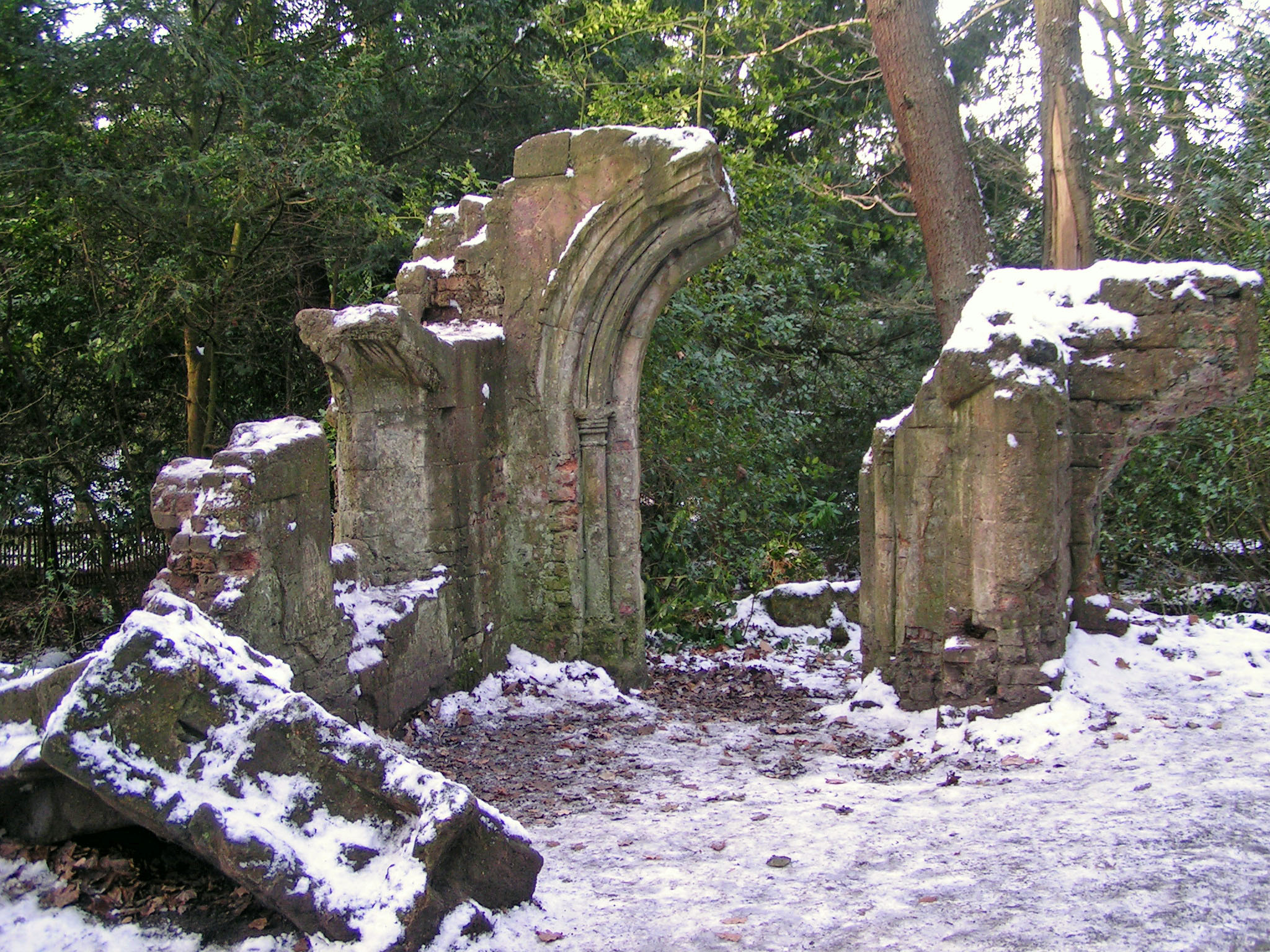
Remnants of a folly ruin in Sydenham Hill Wood

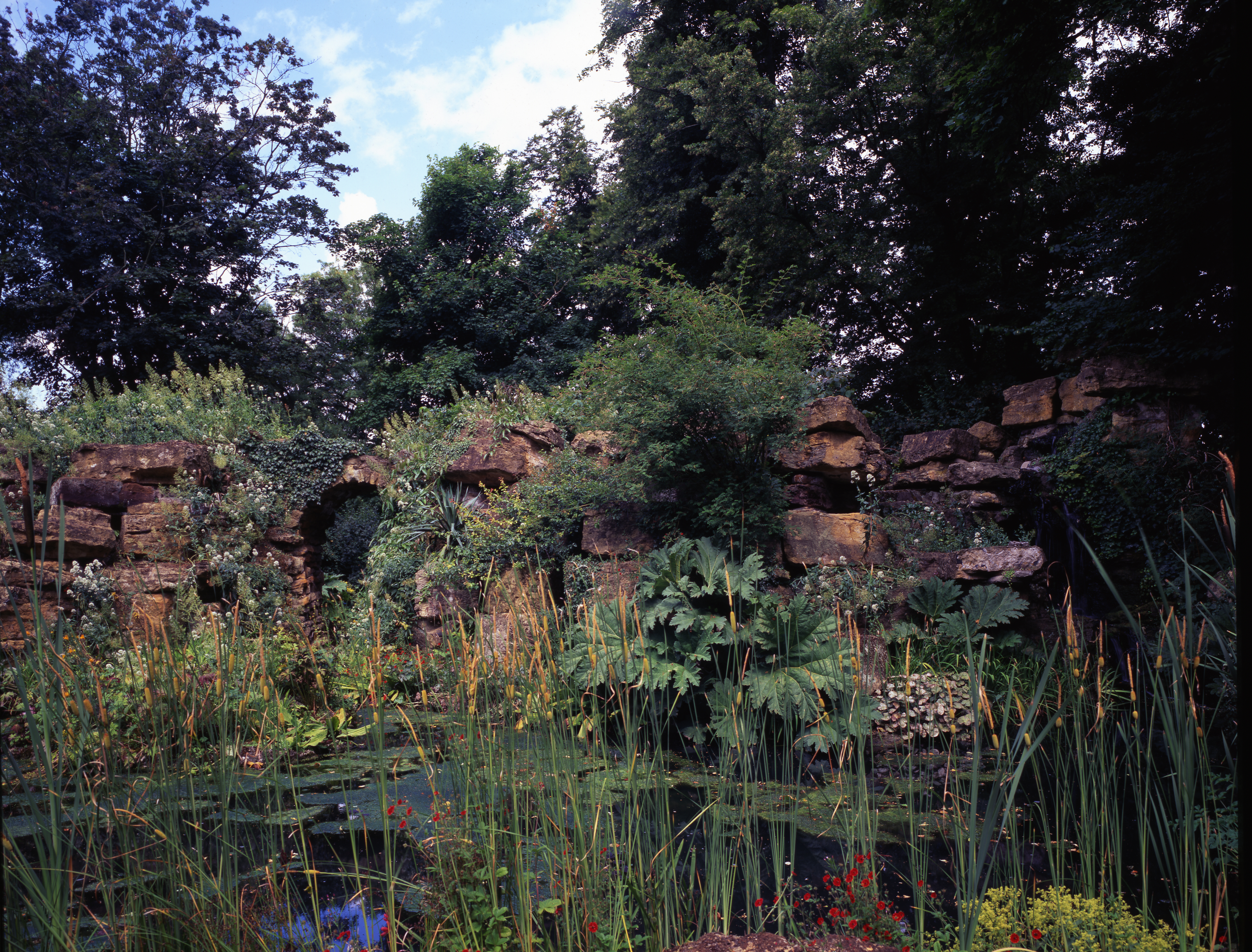
Pulham rocks in the Water Garden at Waddesdon Manor estate

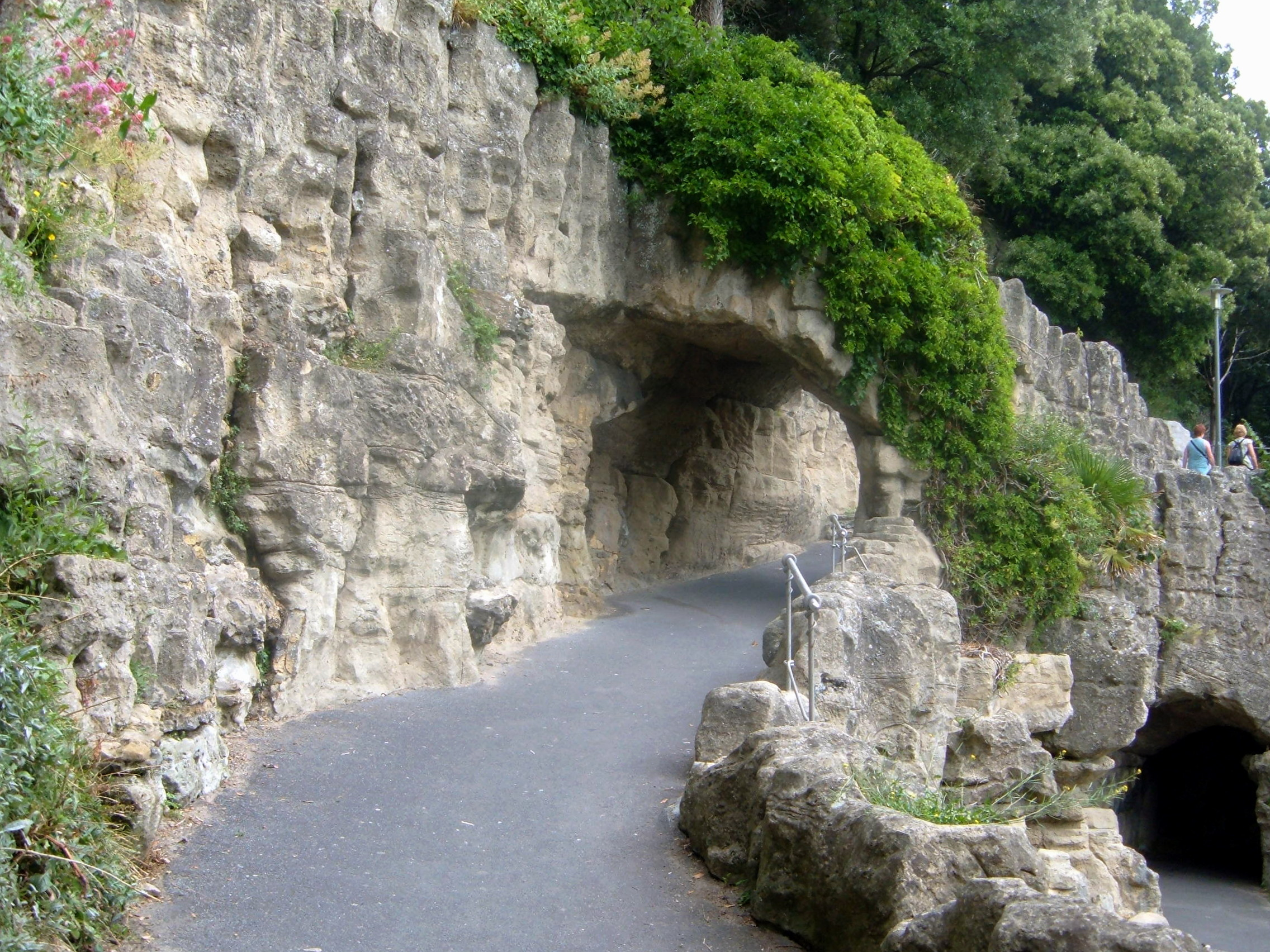
Zig-zag Path in Folkestone

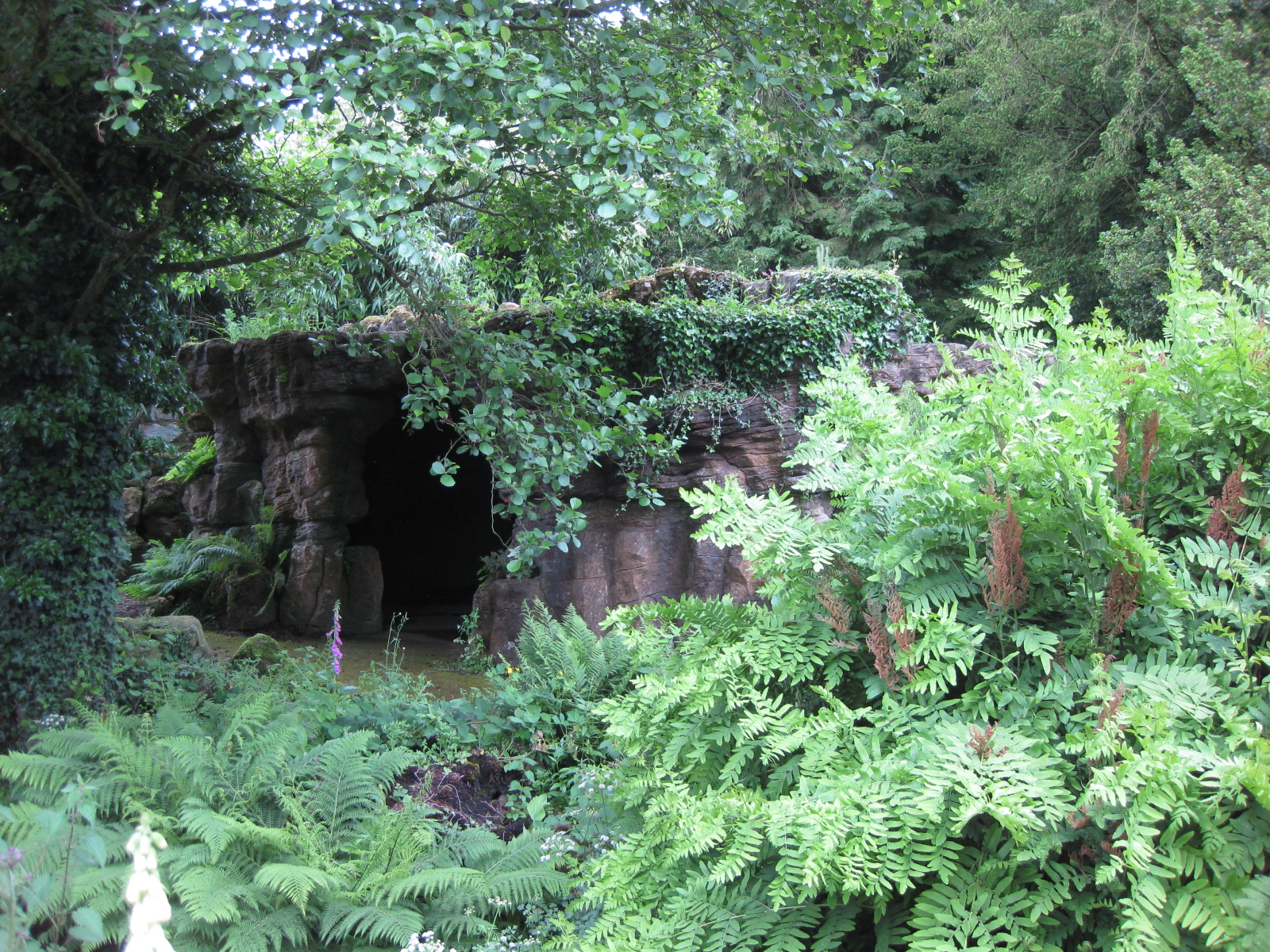
Pulhamite grotto at Wotton House, Surrey

== See also ==
- Cast stone
- Folly
