= St Mary's Church, Welwyn =

Church in Welwyn, Hertfordshire, England

- The church in 2026
- St Mary's Church, Welwyn
- OS grid reference: TL 23099 16275
- Location: Welwyn, Hertfordshire
- Country: England
- Language: English
- Denomination: Anglican
- Website: welwyn.org.uk

Architecture
- Functional status: Active
- Heritage designation: Grade II
- Designated: 24 January 1967

Administration
- Diocese: St. Albans
- Parish: Welwyn

Clergy
- Rector: The Rev'd Dr David Munchin

St. Mary's Church is a Church of England church located in Welwyn, Hertfordshire, in England. It is north of the River Mimram and within the Welwyn conservation area. The present church building is grade II listed.

== History ==
The chancel and nave of the church were built in the thirteenth century, most likely on the site of a destroyed Saxon chapel. The village of Welwyn was significant as it was on the road between Verulamium (St Albans) and Camulodunum (Colchester). The nave was altered in the fourteenth century, then once again in 1662 in order to include a nave aisle. The church tower was also rebuilt at this time. The church was further expanded between 1867 and 1870 with the addition of an organ chamber, a vestry and a choir aisle. The restoration was financed by Charles Willes Wilshere, and the architect was Arthur Blomfield. The nave was also extended during this time, and the St Nicholas tower was built on former graveyard.

The present tower was built in 1910 as part of a rebuilding by Arthur Blomfield's son Charles. The church tower has eight bells and a clock that was made in 1803. The church was awarded grade II listed status in 1967. The church house was constructed on the former northern part of the churchyard in 2007. The church is still open to the public.
