= Danesbury Park =

Park in Hertfordshire, England

Coordinates: 51.8372°N 0.2176°W

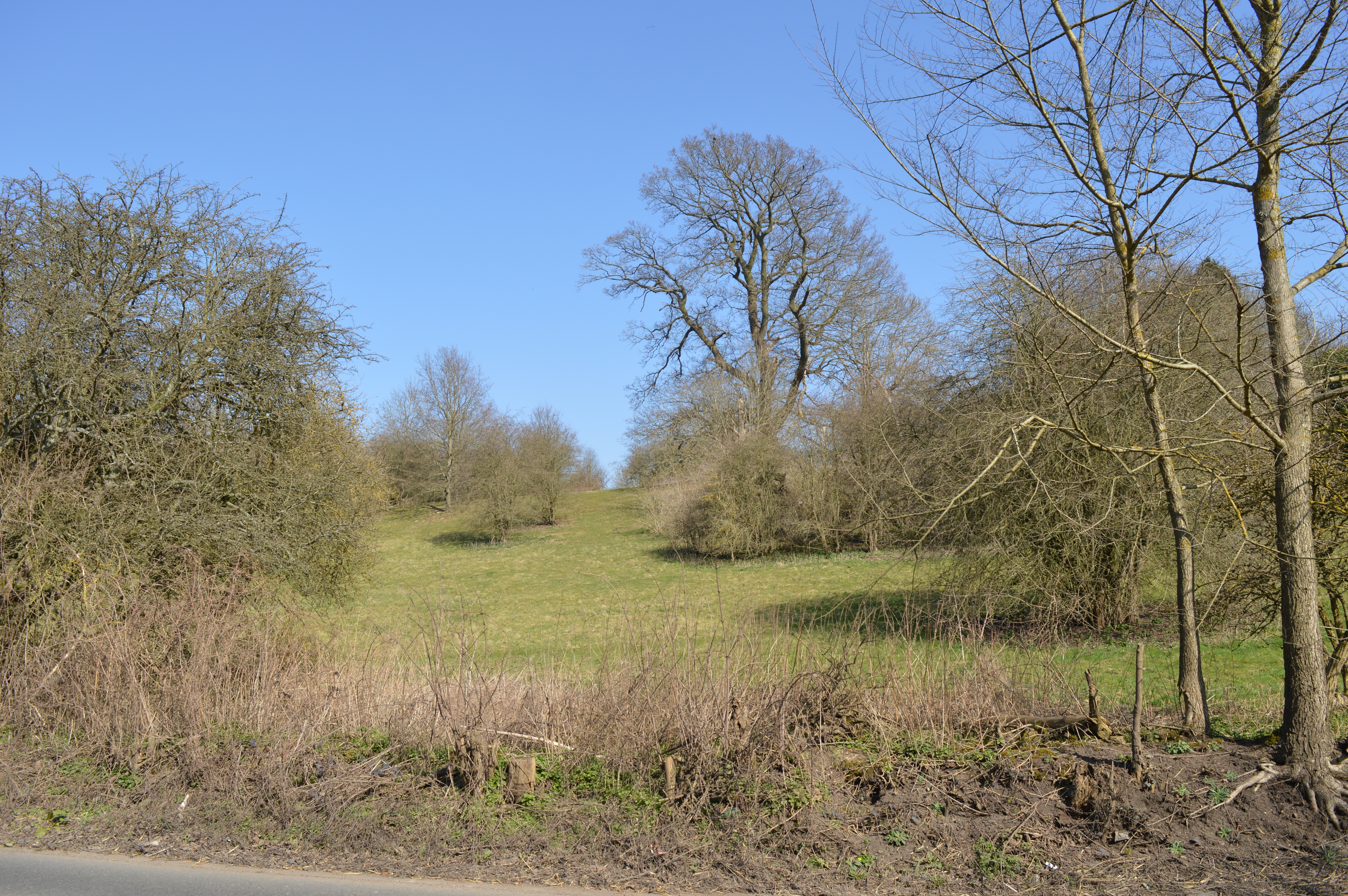

Danesbury Park is a 24.5-hectare (61-acre) public park and Local Nature Reserve in Welwyn in Hertfordshire. It is owned and managed by Welwyn Hatfield Borough Council.

The site was formerly the park of Danesbury House, and it still has some large mature trees which are important to wildlife, especially bats, owls, insects and fungi. The park also has grassland with many varieties of flowering plants, and which is managed by rare-breed cattle, and occasionally by cutting.

There is access from a number of roads including Codicote Road. Another Local Nature Reserve, Singlers Marsh is on the other side of Codicote Road.
