= Rivers of Kent =

Watercourses in Kent, England

Coordinates: 51.2°N 0.7°E

Rivers in Kent.

Four major rivers drain the county of Kent, England.

== River Medway ==
The catchment area of the Medway covers almost 25% of the county. The detailed map has a diagram of that catchment area, which includes its main tributaries: the rivers Eden, Bourne (or Shode), Teise, Beult, Loose and Len.

=== Tributaries of the River Medway ===
- The River Eden
- River Grom
- The River Bourne begins its course west of Oldbury Hill on the Greensand Ridge in the parish of Ightham and enters the Medway upstream of East Peckham, near Tonbridge.
- The River Teise (pronounced tice or teeze) begins in Dunorlan Park in Tunbridge Wells and flows eastwards through Lamberhurst, passing Bayham Abbey. Here the small River Bewl, on which is the reservoir Bewl Water, joins the Teise. The Teise bifurcates 2 km SW of Marden, the minor stream flows directly to Twyford Bridge, Yalding, while the major stream joins the River Beult at Hunton, 1.5 km above Yalding.
- The River Beult (pronounced belt) has its several sources west of Ashford, and then flows through Headcorn and where it is joined by the major stream of the Teise. The river enters the Medway at Yalding.
- Wateringbury Stream rises at West Peckham, flows south east towards Mereworth and then flows in a generally easterly direction to join the Medway at Wateringbury. It is some four miles (6 km) long and until the 20th century powered several watermills.
- The River Loose is a relatively short river starting near Langley south east of Maidstone running west through Loose and joining the Medway at Tovil.
- The River Len has its source at a small watershed south of Lenham. A nearby stream is one of the sources of the Great Stour. The Len flows in a westerly direction and joins the Medway at Maidstone.

== River Stour ==
The River Stour is also known as the Great Stour, especially above its confluence with the Little Stour at Plucks Gutter. Its catchment area covers the eastern part of Kent.

=== Tributaries of the River Stour ===
- East Stour - rising near Hythe to Ashford.
- Little Stour - north of Hythe to join the Great Stour at Plucks Gutter, north west of Canterbury.
- River Wantsum - part of the old Wantsum Channel separating the Isle of Thanet from Kent.
- Whitewater Dyke - running from Shadoxhurst to Ashford
- Ruckinge Dyke - from north of Hamstreet to Ashford
- Aylesford Stream - its source is north of Sevington to Willesborough

== River Darent ==
Its tributary is the River Cray.

== River Dour ==
A minor river from Temple Ewell to Dover

== River Rother ==
A Wealden river. It is included here since for part of its journey near Bodiam it forms the boundary between Kent and East Sussex.
