= Tewingas =

Tribe of Anglo-Saxon England

The Tewingas were a tribe or clan of Anglo-Saxon England, whose territory was centred on the settlement of Welwyn in modern-day Hertfordshire, the site of an early Minster church, and the nearby settlement of Tewin. Its name means either "the people of Tiwa" or "the worshippers of the God Tew".

The tribe and its territory is mentioned in an Anglo Saxon charter of c. 945. Its heartland was in the valley of the River Mimram on well-drained soils. The area shows strong continuity with earlier settlements, with the Welwyn area including an earlier Iron Age oppidum, a Roman small town and several Roman villas.

== Bibliography ==
- Rowe, Anne; Williamson, Tom (2013), Hertfordshire: A Landscape History, Hatfield: University of Hertfordshire Press, p. 298, ISBN 978-1909291027
- Williamson, Tom (2000), The Origins of Hertfordshire, Manchester: Manchester University Press, ISBN 071904491X
