= Whitwell, Hertfordshire =

Village in Hertfordshire, England

Coordinates: 51.876°N 0.283°W

Whitwell
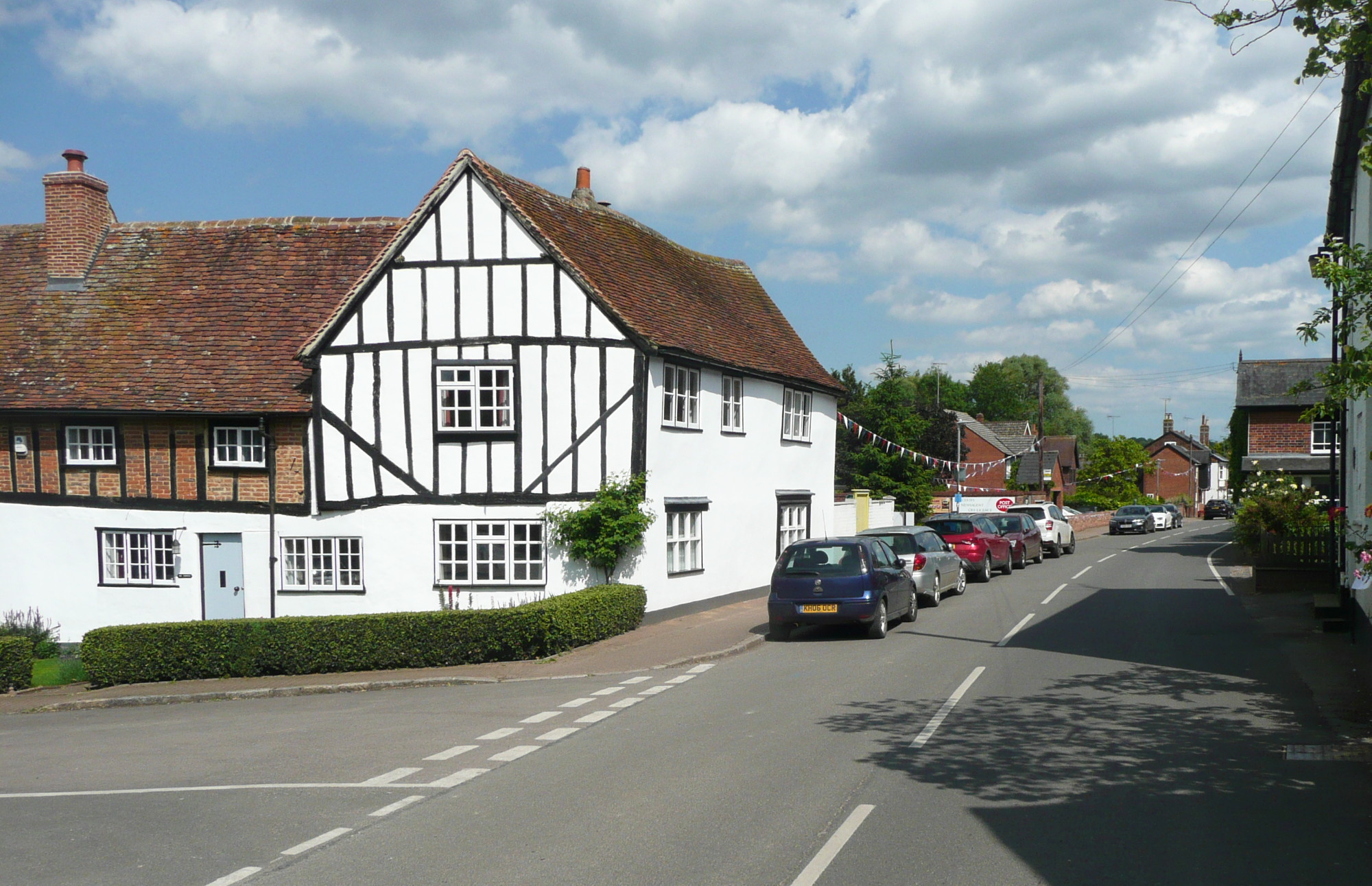
- High Street at junction with The Valley

- Location within Hertfordshire
- Population: 1,024 (Built up area, 2022 estimate)
- OS grid reference: TL1857021096
- District: North Hertfordshire
- Shire county: Hertfordshire
- Region: East
- Country: England
- Sovereign state: United Kingdom
- Post town: HITCHIN
- Postcode district: SG4
- Dialling code: 01438
- Police: Hertfordshire
- Fire: Hertfordshire
- Ambulance: East of England
- UK Parliament: Hitchin and Harpenden

Whitwell is a village in the parish of St Paul's Walden, in the North Hertfordshire district of Hertfordshire, England. It lies 5 miles (8 km) south of Hitchin, its post town. The built up area had an estimated population of 1,024 in 2022.

== Geography ==
The village lies in the valley of the River Mimram, and is about 302 feet (92 m) above sea level. The soil is mostly clay with flints.

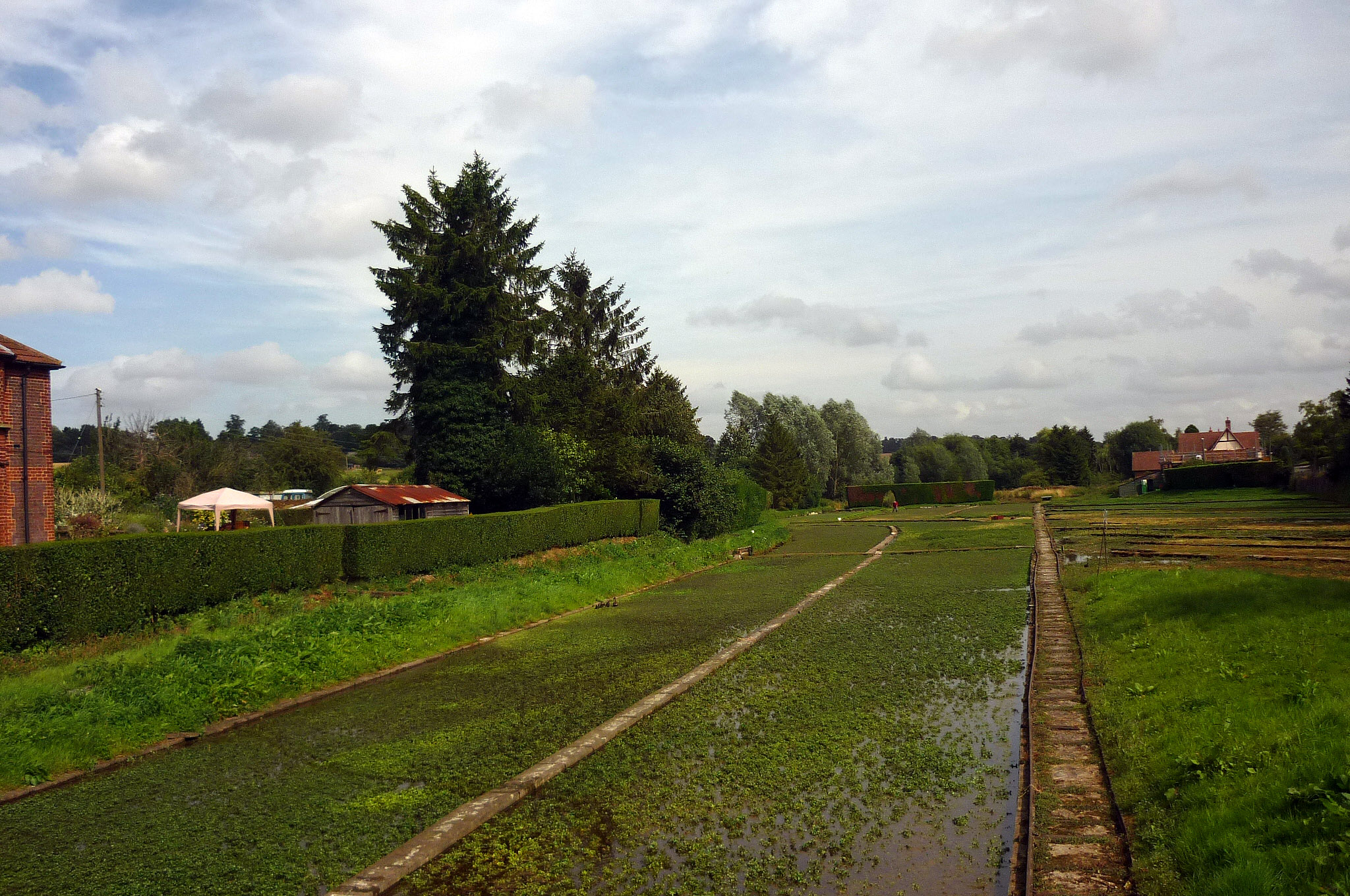
Watercress beds on the Mimram near Lilley Bottom Road

It contains a number of early brick and half-timbered houses, several of which are of the 18th century. Waterhall Farm (an open farm and craft centre) is one of the village's attractions. The village was historically known for its watercress, grown in beds along the Mimram.

St Paul's Walden Primary School is on Bendish Lane in Whitwell.

== History ==
Roman coins have been found in Whitwell.

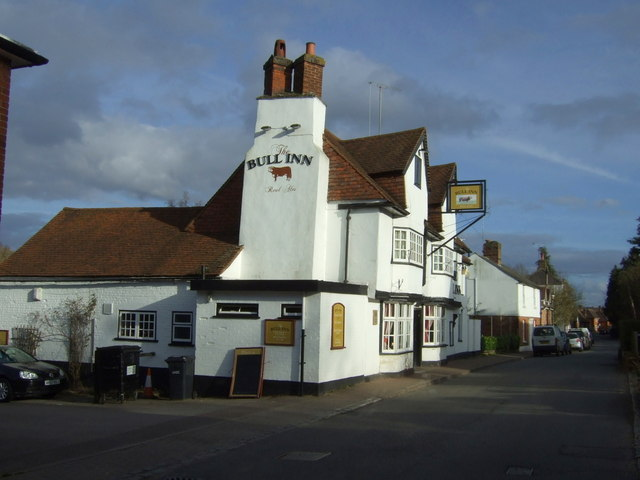
The Bull Inn, High Street

Whitwell was once known for its ‘notorious seven’ public houses, but today only one remains; The Bull Inn. The most recent to close was The Maiden's Head in 2015, which is currently (2021) being developed as a private residence. There are over thirty listed buildings in the village.

From 1926, a factory building on Hitchin Road on the east side of the village was home to engineering company C & A Roberts. The site remained until 2000, when it was demolished, and was eventually replaced by a street of houses named Roberts Court.

== Governance ==
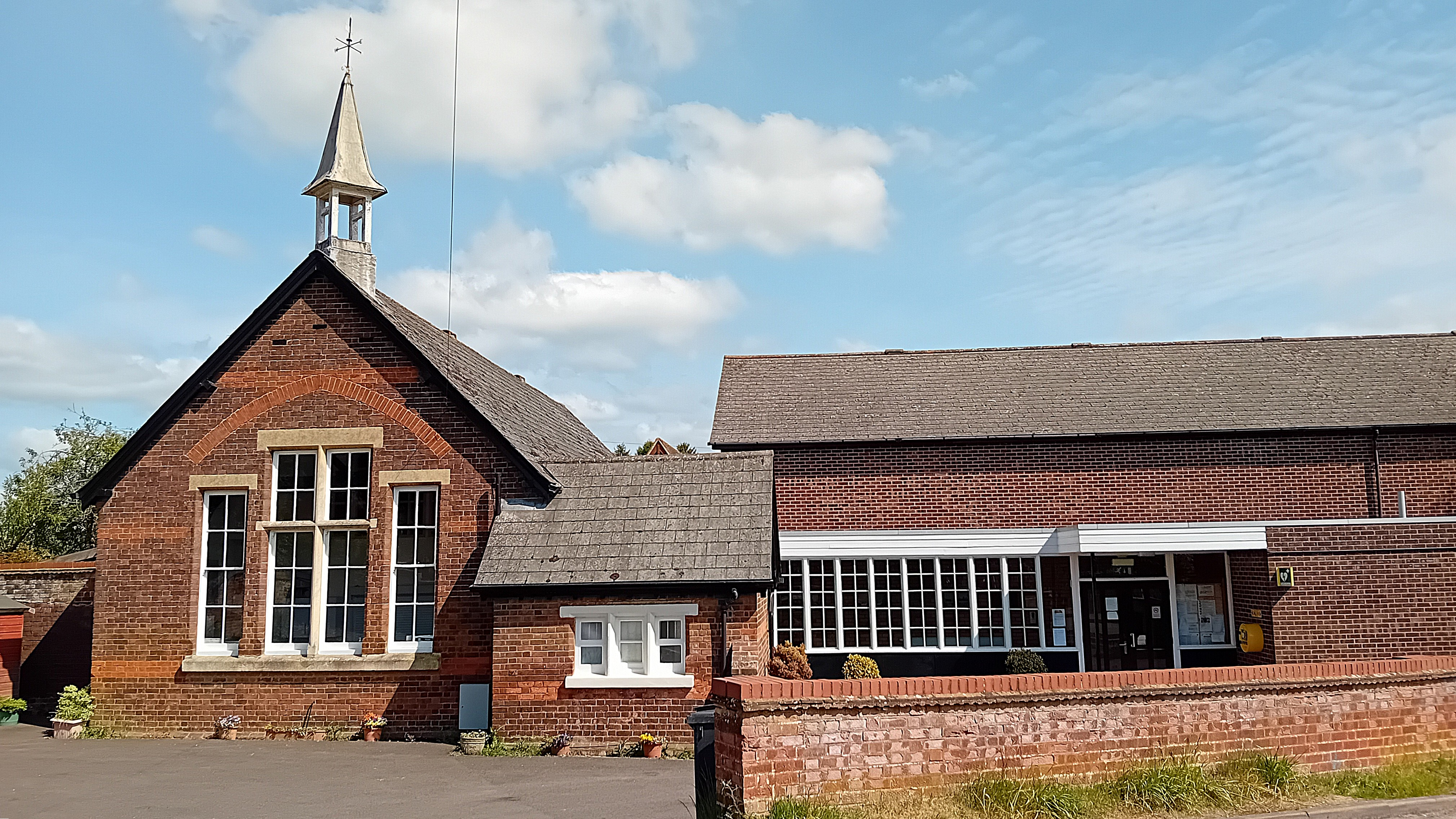
New Fellowship Hall

Whitwell forms part of the parish of St Paul's Walden. There are three tiers of local government covering St Paul's Walden, at parish, district, and county level: St Paul's Walden Parish Council, North Hertfordshire District Council, and Hertfordshire County Council. The parish council meets in Whitwell, either at the village hall on Bendish Lane, known as the New Fellowship Hall, or at the pavilion at the recreation ground on Bradway.

== Whitwell Players ==
 Whitwell also has a thriving amateur dramatics society - The Whitwell Players. As far as it is possible to tell, there has been some form of am dram society in Whitwell for over a century, but The Whitwell Players, in its current guise, came into being in the 1980s. The players perform at least two or three times a year in Spring, Autumn and a Panto in December. As a result of their labours, many people have benefitted as the Players make donations to support local charities on a regular basis.
Highlights include: the company's first Shakespearean production - A Midsummer Night's dream - in 2002, performed both in the village hall and in the open air at the stunning St Paul's Walden Bury gardens, as well as Much Ado About Nothing, Hobson's Choice, Allo, Allo, Blackadder, Calendar Girls, and See How They Run.

== Notable residents ==
- Richard Clarkson (1904-96), chief aerodynamicist of de Havilland from 1935 to 1958, and hence was responsible for the de Havilland Mosquito, who grew up in the village; his father lived in the village as well
