= Codicote =

Village and parish in Hertfordshire, England

Coordinates: 51.850°N 0.236°W

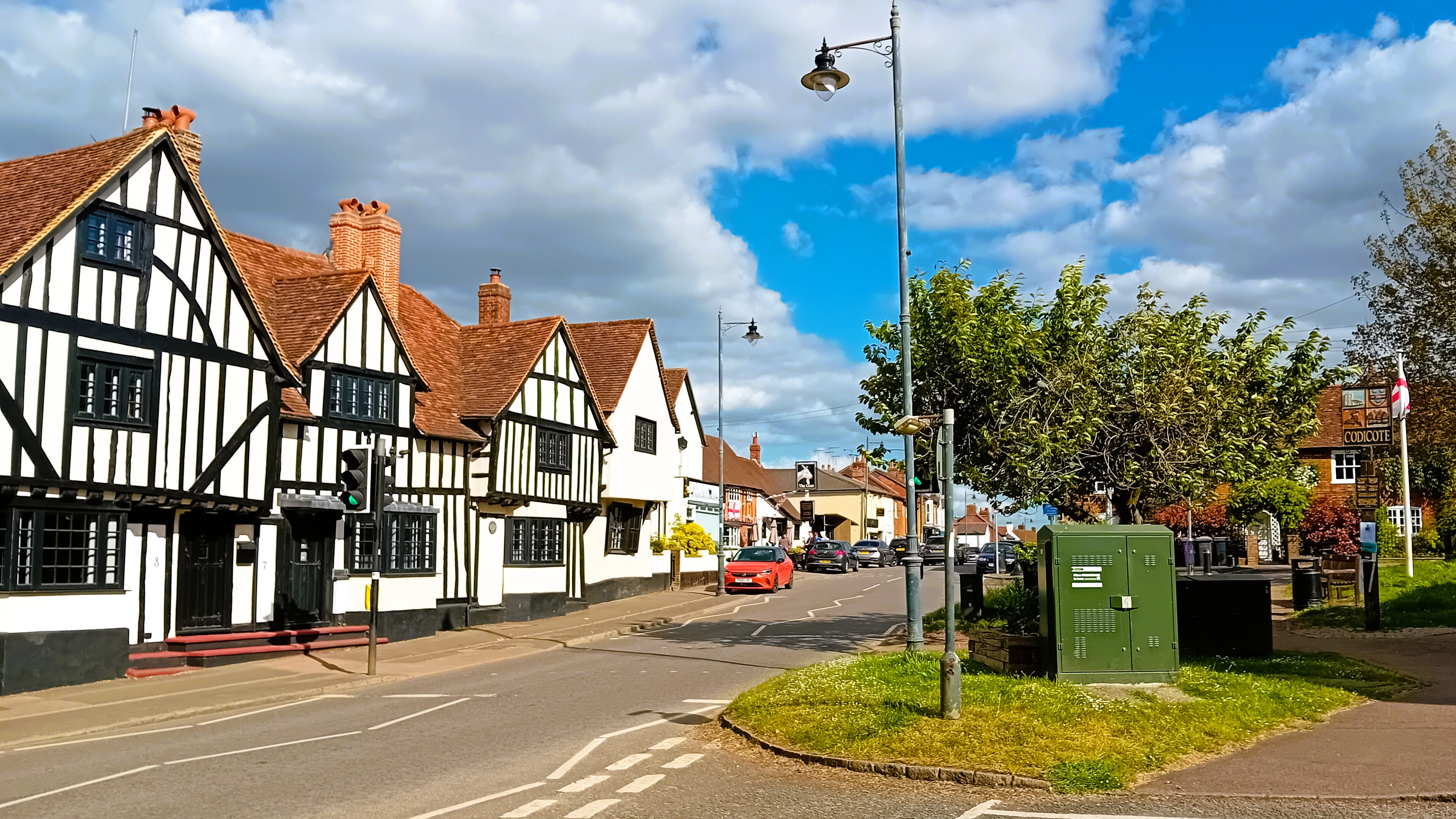
- The Hill: green at junction of High Street and St Albans Road

- Location within Hertfordshire
- Population: 3,586 (Parish, 2021)
- District: North Hertfordshire
- Shire county: Hertfordshire
- Region: East
- Country: England
- Sovereign state: United Kingdom
- Post town: HITCHIN
- Postcode district: SG4
- Dialling code: 01438
- UK Parliament: Stevenage

Codicote (/ˈkɒdɪkət/ KO-dih-kət) is a village and civil parish in the North Hertfordshire district of Hertfordshire, England. It lies 7 miles (11 km) south of Hitchin, its post town, and 1.5 miles (2.4 km) north of Welwyn. Codicote was a small market town between the 13th and 16th centuries. The population of the parish was 3,586 at the 2021 census.

== History ==
The first Anglo-Saxon settlements in England were created by the invaders themselves. Later individuals or small groups tended to leave these villages to found other secondary settlements in between. The element '-cote' in the name Codicote is typical of this second phase and so it is likely that this village was founded in the later period of colonisation. Thus at some time, perhaps around 600 AD, a man with a name something like Cudda came to the area and founded a settlement. The earliest form of the name is recorded in 1002 as Cuthingcoton, meaning the "cottages of Cuthhere's people". A later alternative form of the name was Cudingacotu in which the first element is "Cuda" a diminutive of Cuthhere.

Codicote is first recorded in 1002, when Æthelred the Unready, its owner, sold it by means of a charter for the sum of 150 mancusae, or 900 shillings of pure gold to his 'faithful minister' Ælfhelm. It was described as being 'five measures of ground' (of uncertain extent) and known as 'Æt Cuthingcoton'. Shortly after this it passed to the Abbot and Chapter of St Albans Abbey.

By 1086, the Domesday Book shows its value at six pounds. There was a total of eight 'hides' in the manor, perhaps 960 acres (3.9 km^{2}), of which the Abbot's bailiff farmed three and a quarter hides as the Abbot's 'home farm'. The rest was shared between a number of tenants, 16 'villeins', three humbler cottagers and one 'Frenchman' who may have been the bailiff. In addition there were four (landless) serfs. This suggests a total population of about 100 persons including women and children. There were two mills (now known as Codicote Mill and Fulling Mill, both on the Mimram), some meadow and pasture and some woodland.

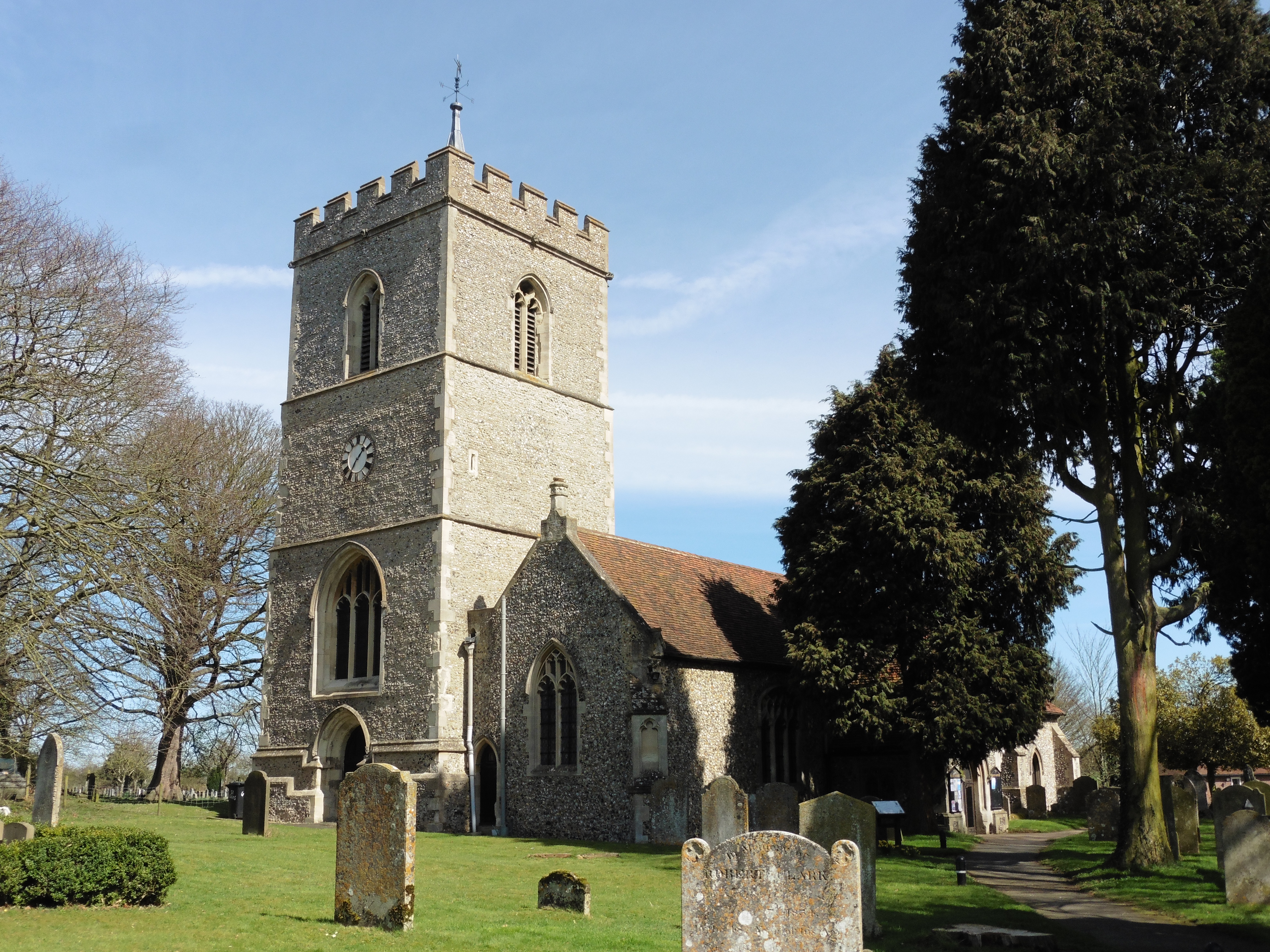
St Giles' Church

No priest is mentioned in the Domesday Book at Codicote, suggesting it was not yet a parish. Codicote has a very irregular parish boundary with Welwyn (which did have a priest mentioned in the Domesday Book). Such irregular boundaries often indicate the division of a larger parish in the period after the Norman Conquest. Codicote's parish church of St Giles was built in the early 12th century. It is known that it was dedicated by Ralph d'Escures whilst he was Bishop of Rochester, which was between 1108 and 1115. Presumably, Codicote became a separate parish around the same time. The church was extensively restored in 1853; the main earlier material still visible is the 15th century tower.

St Giles stands on the north-eastern edge of the modern village, alongside the manor house, known as The Bury. The area around the church may indicate an early centre for the village. The main road through the parish (now High Street, the B656) passes 500 metres south-west of the church. In the late 13th century, St Albans Abbey as the manorial owner of Codicote secured a market charter and annual fair for Codicote. (Note: Sources conflict on when exactly the market charter was granted. The Victoria County History (1908) says the market was reported as having been operating for ten years in 1262, Codicote Local History Society says permission to hold the market was given in 1267, and modern road signs at the edge of the village say "Granted a market in 1279 AD".) A market place was established at the junction of St Albans Road and High Street, and the focus for the village shifted to be around the market place (which became known as The Hill) and along High Street.

Codicote was badly affected by the Black Death of the late 1340s, with half the village's population dying from the disease. The market continued to operate until the Reformation. Codicote's landlord, St Albans Abbey, was dissolved in 1539, and Codicote's market seems to have ceased operating around the same time. The Codicote estates of St Albans Abbey were claimed by the crown and subsequently sold into private ownership.

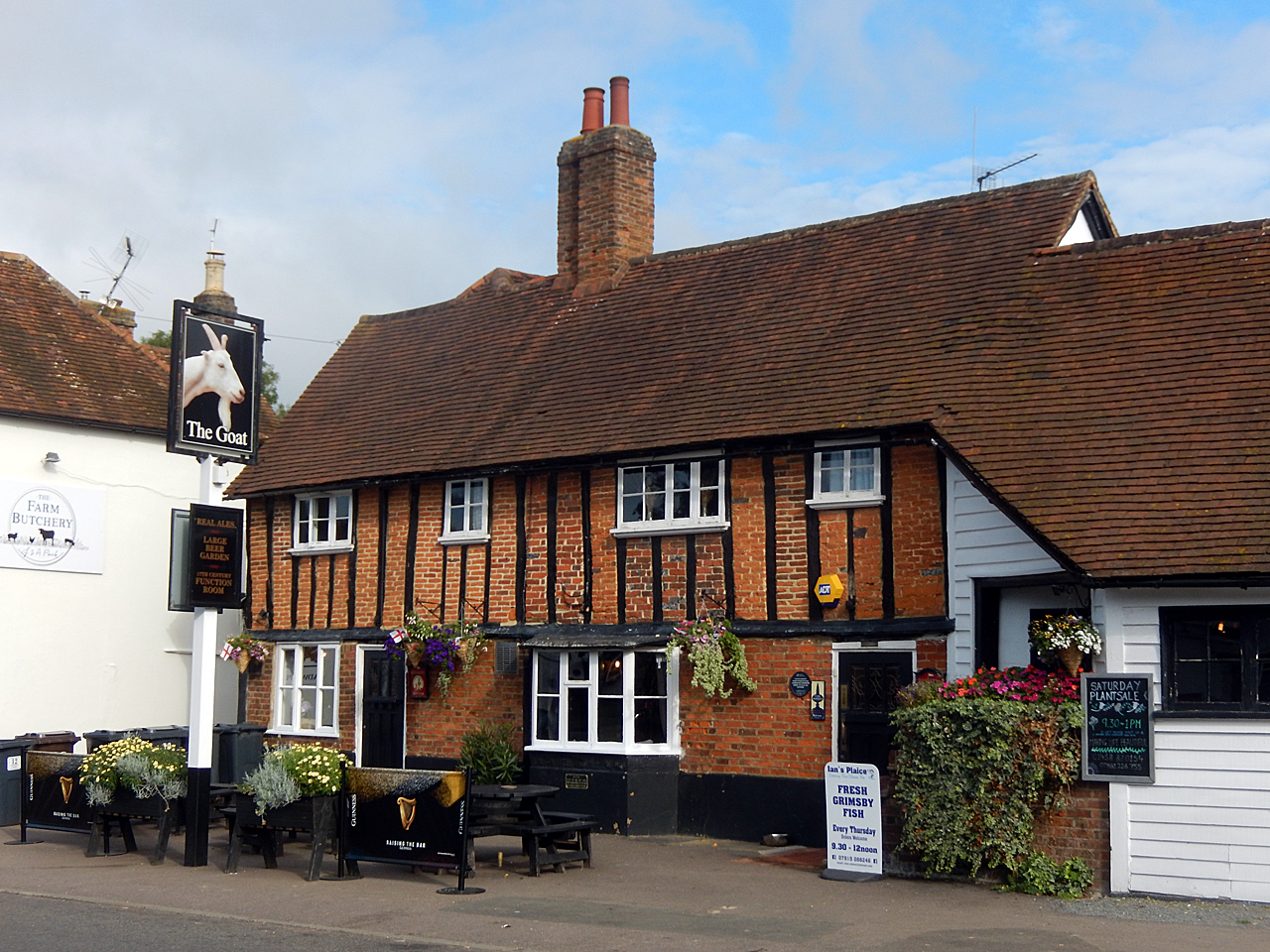
The Goat, High Street

The Welwyn Turnpike Trust was established in 1726 to improve various roads in the area, including Codicote's High Street as part of the main road linking Hitchin to the Great North Road at Welwyn. Codicote had several public houses along the High Street, including the George and Dragon, the Bell, and the Red Lion, which have all since closed and been converted to other uses. The prominent timber-framed George and Dragon, which dates back to at least the 16th century, became a Chinese restaurant before being converted into housing called Taverners Place. There are two pubs still operating on the High Street, being the Globe and the Goat, the latter being another timber-framed building dating back to the 16th century.

== Geography ==
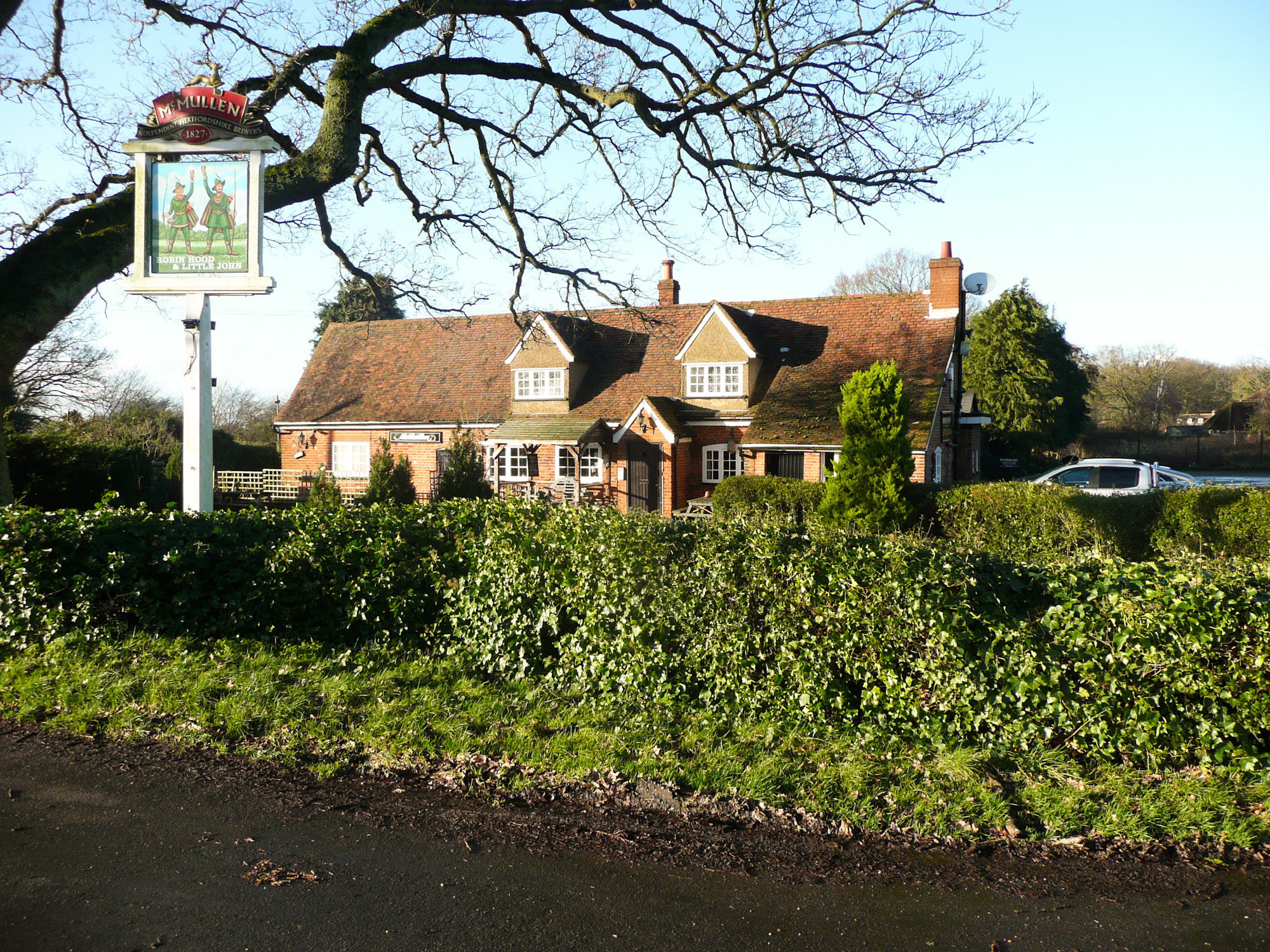
The Robin Hood and Little John at Rabley Heath, one of the outlying hamlets of Codicote parish

Codicote lies on a chalk ridge on the dip slope of the Chiltern Hills. The highest parts of the parish lie in the north and east, most of which is over 120 metres (390 ft) above sea level, and at one point 140 metres (460 ft) is reached. The River Mimram flows to the south-west of the village; this part of its valley is known as Codicote Bottom. On the west side of the river the land rises to about 120m at Abbotshay. As well as Codicote village itself, the parish also contains numerous small hamlets, including Nup End and Rabley Heath.

Node Court, in the countryside north of the village, was built as a model dairy farm in 1928 in a distinctive picturesque style with thatched roofs. The complex was badly damaged in a fire in 2015, and as at 2025 proposals for its reconstruction are still being considered.

== Governance ==
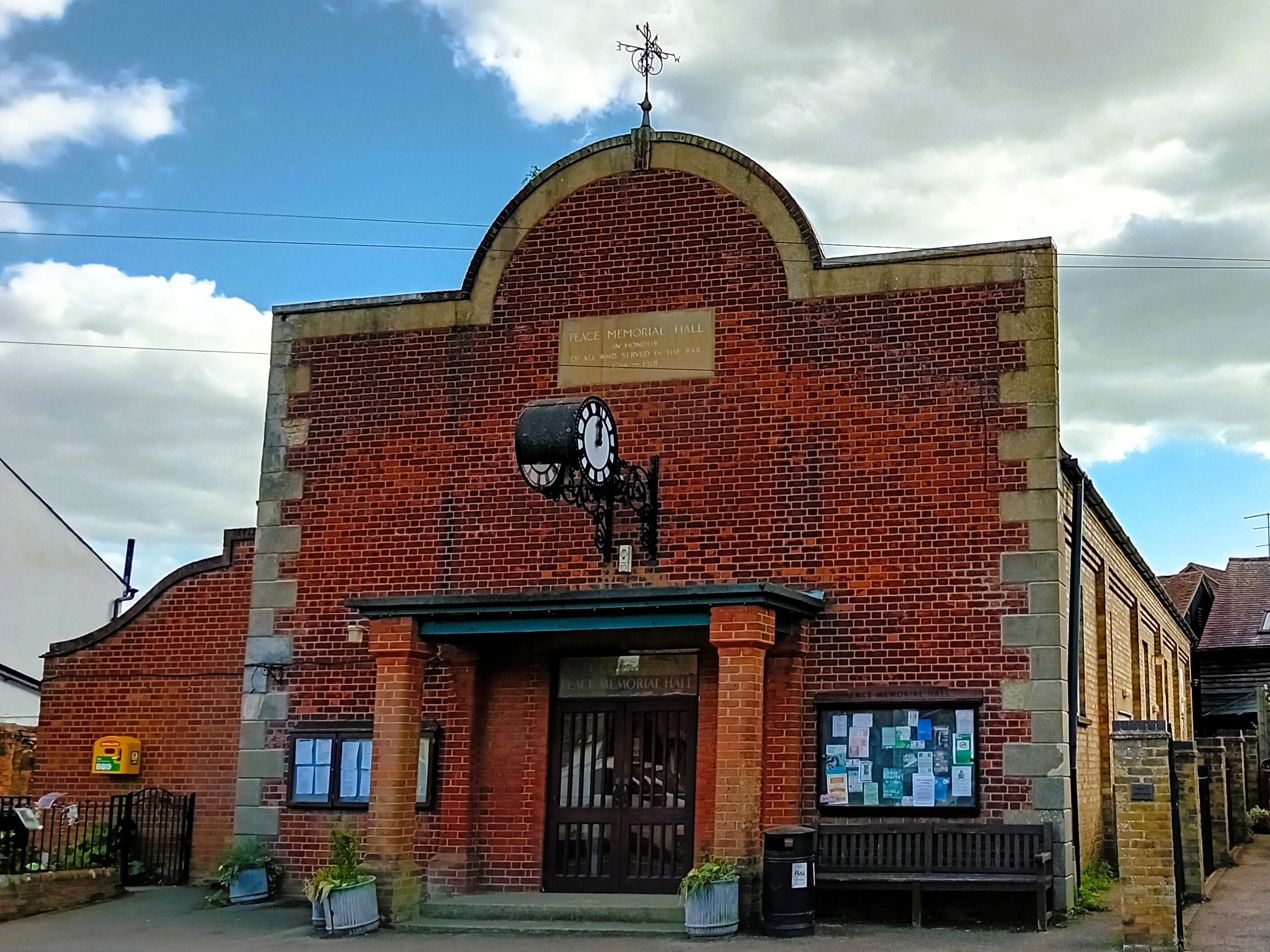
Peace Memorial Hall, High Street

There are three tiers of local government covering Codicote, at parish, district, and county level: Codicote Parish Council, North Hertfordshire District Council, and Hertfordshire County Council. The parish council meets at the Peace Memorial Hall on the High Street, which was built in 1927.

== Population ==
At the 2021 census, the population of the parish was 3,586. The population had been 3,344 in 2011.

== Education ==
Codicote Church of England Primary School dates back to 1857 and the current school, on Meadow Way, was built in 1972. State secondary education is provided by schools in nearby towns and the vast majority of pupils move on to Hitchin Boys' School, Hitchin Girls' School and Monk's Walk School. Private and other schools are also well catered for in nearby towns.

== Sports ==
The current sports field and facilities came about as a result of the death in 1976 of John Clements, a local teacher who died rescuing 35 children by leading them from a burning hotel. He was subsequently awarded the George Cross. A memorial trust fund was established in his honour which led to the current sports field and a changing facility being opened in 1984 and an extension to changing facilities being added in 2000.

There are currently three main outdoor sports areas and activities in the village:

- Two football pitches used by two senior teams in Herts Premier League, 1 under 18, 1 under 17, 2 under 11, 1 under 7 team and 2 Ladies teams
- Three tennis courts
- A cricket wicket used by up to four cricket teams

Full planning permission was granted on 30 April 2009 for the £1.7m Sports Hall. The structure measures 48.1 meters by 19.3 meters and includes a sports hall, function room, youth club and changing facilities. The new John Clements Sports & Community Centre was completed in 2011. This allows indoor sports such as 5-a-side football, indoor tennis, cricket nets, bowls, basketball and netball.

Non-League football club Codicote F.C. are one of the senior teams using the John Clements Memorial Ground.

Codicote Tennis Club has three floodlit hard courts and is based at Codicote Sports & Social Centre in Hertfordshire.

Codicote Village Day is an annual one-day festival which begins with a parade up the High St and proceeds to the Sports and Recreation field where there are events, stalls and attractions.

== Notable residents ==
- Robert Newman: British comedian, author and political activist. Former comedy partner of David Baddiel. Grew up in the Hertfordshire villages of Datchworth, Codicote and Whitwell.
- Kim Wilde: British pop singer, author, television presenter. Married in the village church of St. Giles in September 1996.

== Local and family history ==
Codicote Local History Society is dedicated to researching and spreading knowledge about Codicote's history. Active for over 30 years, the society ran a wide-ranging series of public events and a few archaeological digs in 2018–19. In 2020, the society published a series of old photos of the village under the title Snippets from Codicote's Past.

A 2008 BBC programme, Christina: A Medieval Life, presented by Michael Wood, focused upon the life and times of Christina Cok (died 1348) in Codicote, studying the archives relating to her father's acquisition of field strips and marketplace property, which she took over in the 14th century. She won a consistory court case over her claim to the rights to her land.
