= Mardley Heath =

Nature reserve in Hertfordshire, England

Coordinates: 51.8494°N 0.1925°W

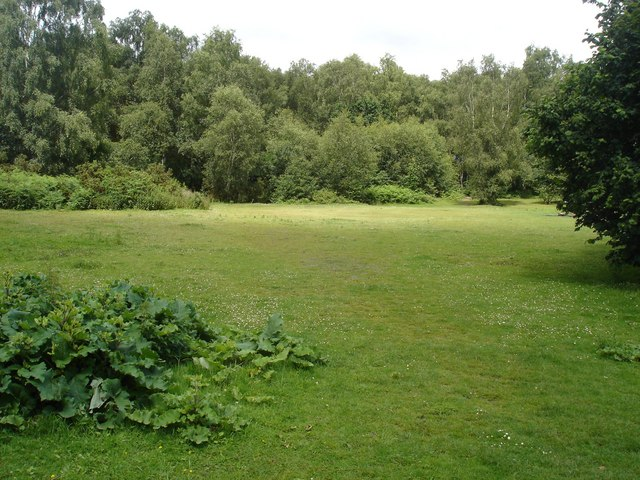

Mardley Heath is a 41.1 hectare Local Nature Reserve in Welwyn in Hertfordshire. It is owned by Welwyn Hatfield Borough Council and managed by the council together with the Friends of Mardley Heath.

In the Middle Ages Mardley Heath was common land, used by villagers for collecting fuel and grazing their animals. By the middle of the nineteenth century most of it had been enclosed, and in the mid twentieth it was used for gravel extraction. In 1967 it was acquired by the Rural District of Welwyn, and it is now managed for public recreation and maintaining the diversity of the woodland on the site. The heathland has regenerated since the gravel extraction ceased, and the oak and hornbeam woodland remains.

There is a car park on Heath Road.
