= Ruckinge Dyke =

River in England

Coordinates: 51°07′41″N 0°52′47″E

Physical characteristics
- Source
  - location: Hamstreet
- Mouth
  - location: Great Stour
- Length: 7.9 km (4.9 mi)

Ruckinge Dyke, in relation to the Great Stour and other Rivers of Kent

Ruckinge Dyke is a tributary of the Great Stour, joining with the East Stour and then the Great Stour at Pledge's Mill at the bottom of East Hill in Ashford, Kent, England.

The stream runs from its source north of Hamstreet, 7.9 kilometres, to the East Stour in Willesborough.
