= Dunorlan Park =

Park in Tunbridge Wells, United Kingdom

- The avenue leading from the fountain to the Grecian temple (courtesy of Tunbridge Wells Museum)

- Location within Kent
- Location: Tunbridge Wells
- Coordinates: 51°8′0″N 0°17′2″E
- Area: Kent
- Designation: Grade II

Dunorlan Park is a park and grounds in Royal Tunbridge Wells, UK.

Totalling approximately 78 acres (32 ha) and containing a 6-acre (2.4 ha) lake, the grounds were landscaped by Robert Marnock for Henry Reed, the merchant and philanthropist who owned the estate and the now-demolished house that once overlooked it.

== History ==
=== Development ===
First record of the land is under the name of Burnthouse or Calverly Manor Farm which appears on a Tunbridge Wells map produced by John Bowra in 1738. After the death of the owner, a Mr Thomas Panuwell, in 1823, the farm was purchased by a land developer called John Ward, who intended to build a 1,000-acre (400 ha) Calverly Estate to rival the lower village of Tunbridge Wells which was centred around the spring in the Pantiles.

Henry Reed (painted in 1870)

However, in the 1850s the farmhouse and lands were purchased by Henry Reed who was the driving force behind the park as it stands today. Mr Reed demolished the house that stood on the grounds and built his own mansion, completed in 1862, which he named Dunorlan. In a sale brochure of 1871/2 the mansion was described as "a most elegant and substantial mansion, erected ... entirely of Normandy stone, in the Italian style of architecture, finished throughout in the most perfect manner, and in every way adapted for the comfort and enjoyment of a nobleman or gentleman of fortune". However, Mr Reed was "not at all satisfied with the house" on its completion and during its construction "he was not at all satisfied with the plan. The architect, however, said that his reputation was at stake and he would not have anything altered". As his family grew, he decided to pull down part of the building and erect a new wing. The 1881 Census (the house at this point now belonging to the Collins family) shows the house to have operated with 11 servants, a testament to its size.

To complement the house the surrounding fields were landscaped and formed into a park under the direction and design of Robert Marnock, one of the leading landscape designers of his day. These grounds were often used by Henry Reed in his evangelical pursuits, and during his last few years there he invited local ministers to hold open air services under the fine beech trees on the lawn, with over 500 invitations to attend sent to the local gentry.

=== Robert Marnock's influence ===
In designing the grounds of Dunorlan, Marnock adhered to his guiding principle of "harmony with nature". The lake was adapted to form a "fine ornamental sheet of water" and a "luxuriant avenue of deodoras and douglas picea, leading from a Grecian temple to a handsome stone basin and fountain".

=== Henry Reed's departure ===
Dunorlan House from the 1871 Sales Brochure courtesy of Tunbridge Wells Museum

Despite the huge expense and time invested in Dunorlan, Henry Reed moved to Harrogate in 1870 and Dunorlan was put up for sale, with an original sales brochure remaining in the Tunbridge Wells museum today. The cause of this move is attributed by his widow (Mrs Margaret S.E Reed) to the fault some Christian people in England found with him because of the house. However, it proved difficult to find a buyer with two auctions being aborted in 1871 and 1872. Despite the favorable depictions of the property in the sales brochure (as quoted above), others viewed the mansion far less favourably, with a servant of the house describing it as "an architectural monstrosity (which) represented everything one might expect from a man with too much money and too little taste". Eventually it was sold to Brenton Halliburton Collins, a banker from Halifax, Nova Scotia and on his death, it was inherited by his son, Carteret Fitzgeral Collins who subsequently died in 1941. At this point the house fell vacant before being requisitioned for the war effort on 15 May 1941.

=== Dunorlan during World War II ===
Originally the mansion built by Reed was used to house troops, who are accused of using the statues lining the avenue from the Grecian temple to the fountain for target practice. In 1943 the War Damage Commission took up residence and stayed at the mansion for 14 years. Shortly after the family of Carteret Collins entered into negotiations with the Council regarding selling Dunorlan and the grounds for the public benefit. Eventually the estate and other surrounding lands owned by the family were sold to the Council for £42,000.

=== Dunorlan open to the public ===
Initially only intended to be temporary, 30 acres (12 ha) of land were opened to the public. This soon became permanent and Dunorlan Park was born, with the next two years seeing the installation of footpaths, fences and seats and in 1950 King George VI awarded two swans to the park. Boating on the lake began April 1949 and has continued to run every year since.

=== Dunorlan House fire ===
In 1946, the same year the park was opened to the public, a fire broke out in the house, while still being used by the War Damage Commission. Restorative works were performed to ensure the building was usable, but when the Commission surrendered the property back to the Council on 31 July 1957, the Council could find no use for it. In September 1957 it was sold for development and was demolished in the following year. Eight new houses were constructed on the site.

=== Modern history ===
The tea pavilion was built in 1966 and the park continued to operate unchanged until 1996 when meadows on the south side of the estate, previously leased out for grazing and thus not open to the public, were incorporated into the park and are now managed for their wildlife interest. Other areas of these meadows are occasionally leased out for events and shows including both the Chinese and Moscow State Circus, and previously the Hawkenbury Allotment Holders' Association (HAHA) annual show.

== Restoration project ==
Friends of Dunorlan Park Logo featuring the Grecian Temple

=== The Friends of Dunorlan Park ===
The Friends of Dunorlan Park started as an informal conservation group in the 1990s, when signs of neglect and underinvestment were shown by many features in the park. After meetings with the Tunbridge Wells Council about restoration initiatives, an initial application for lottery funding, under the Urban Parks Programme was made. This application was turned down, but a subsequent application to the new Heritage Lottery Fund was submitted in 1999. In this time, The Friends of Dunorlan Park was officially launched in October 1996 and became a registered charity (No. 1063715/0) on 31 July 1997.

In February 2003, the Heritage Lottery Fund approved a grant of £2.1 Million towards the cost of the extensive restoration of the park, back to the original Robert Marnocks designs. Historic England listed Dunorlan on the National Register of Historic Parks and Gardens, giving it Grade II listing in 2002.

== Main features of the park ==
=== Chalybeate spring ===
After the discovery of the chalybeate spring in the area now known as The Pantiles in 1606, many local landowners attempted to establish rival springs on their own land. One such spring was situated at the then Burnthouse farm and can still be seen in Dunorlan Park today. It was described in 1832 (before Marnock came to design the landscape) by John Britton as a spring which "rises rapidly into a stone basin, placed in the centre of a circular excavation, about ten feet in diameter and six or eight feet deep, which is bricked round, and with the remains of stone steps leading down to the basin at the bottom".

=== Terrace ===
The only surviving part of Dunorlan House is the terrace which leads to its entrance. Once gravelled, it is now paved with York stone and affords dramatic views across the park and of the surrounding farmland.

=== Water system ===
==== The lake ====
The lake totals approximately 6 acres (2.4 ha) and is supplied by the River Teise a tributary of the River Medway), which rises in the valley Dunorlan Park is set into. The river was dammed twice to form a pond, and subsequently the lake. The lake then flows over a cascade into the Victorian water garden and pond before reaching the fountain. Various types of boat hire are available in the summer months. Protracted repairs to the main dam required the lake to be lowered, drawing attention to the heavy silting and the failure of the stream feeding the water system.

==== The cascade ====
The cascade has changed little since it was built in the 19th century. It operates between the main lake and the water garden adjacent to the fountain. The deterioration of the Cascade was one of the main motivators behind seeking restoration of the park and the repairs were designed to ensure the operation of the cascade throughout the year.

==== Fountain ====
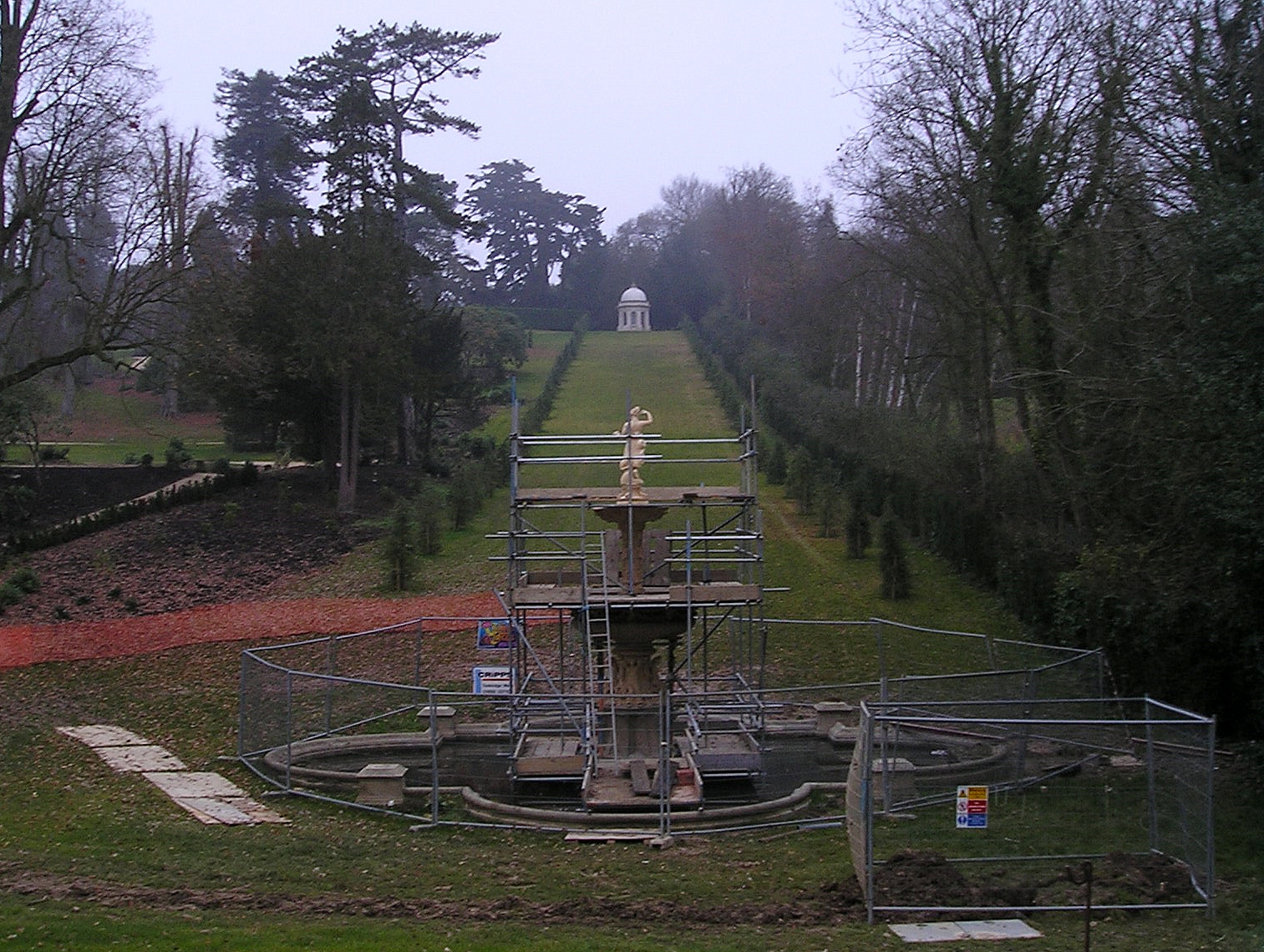
The fountain during restoration with the newly planted avenue and Grecian temple

This is one of the stand-out features of the park and has been a major focus for the restoration efforts. The splendid fountain is adorned with dolphins, water nymphs and classical figures and is constructed out of Pulhamite (an artificial stone invented by the family) and terracotta. It is a Grade II listed building.

The fountain was designed and built by the Pulham family, with high quality terracotta and Pulhamite furniture a major aspect of their work. They became renowned for their work winning several medals and exhibiting at the Great Exhibition of 1862. One of the two works exhibited there was the upper section of what is now Dunorlan Fountain. Originally called the Hebe Fountain, due to the image of Hebe - daughter of Zeus, at the top, James Pullham II received recommendation for the architectural decoration in terracotta. The fountain is shown clearly in the image from the Dunorlan Sales Brochure, with Hebe atop the central column and four kneeling Triton figures around the base. These details were long absent from the fountain, believed to have been used as target practice by the service men occupying the house during World War II, succumbing to the same fate as the statues that lined the avenue. However, the restoration project has completely renovated the fountain to return it to its former glory.

The fountain was a major focus of the restoration project and a new statue of Hebe was built in terracotta by specialist sculptors. While dismantling the fountain for repair other sections and figures were found in need of replacement. The four Triton figures on the outer edge of the fountain; spraying water back into the bottom pond, were not replaced for fear they would be easily damaged. The restoration won a Civic Trust Award for the restoration.

=== Grecian Temple ===
The Grecian Temple containing The Dancing Girl Statue

The Grecian Temple was built by the renowned Pulham family. Made from Portland stone and some Pulhamite, the temple stands at the top of the avenue leading down to the fountain at the base of the hill. The temple has been part of the focus of the restoration project, partly to reveal the detailed and colourful painting inside that had been covered by sections of modern paint. It is a Grade II listed building.

==== Dancing Girl statue ====
A Close-up of The Dancing Girl

The Dancing Girl is a statue that stood in the Grecian temple. It was gifted to the town by Alderman RD Burslem in 1951 for the enjoyment of the park and was sculpted by William Theed a renowned Victorian sculptor. It has always been a favourite among visitors and is described as a "valuable part of the park's and the town's heritage", and "precious and historically significant". It was reportedly worth £50,000.

===== Theft of the statue =====
The Dancing Girl was stolen from the park on the night of Sunday 23 October 2006. The theft was discovered just before 8am Monday 24 October by a member of staff who noticed the glass window of Grecian temple had been removed. Vehicle tracks led from the top entrance of the park (that at Pembury Road) to the temple, but it is unknown how the statue was removed from the plinth it was attached to.

A reward of £1500 was offered by the town council for information leading to its return. Councillor James Scholes said; "We are anxious to see the statue safely returned". As of August 2015 the whereabouts of the statue is still unknown.

=== Victoria Cross Grove ===
The Victoria Cross Grove commemorates ten recipients of the Victorian Cross who had connections to the borough of Tunbridge Wells. The area was planted with 21 oak trees during the winter of 1994/5 and dedicated on the 50th anniversary of Victory in Europe Day, 8 May 1995. In 2006, to mark the 400th anniversary of Royal Tunbridge Wells and the 150th anniversary of the Victoria Cross, Andrew Motion (the poet laureate) was commissioned to write a poem, and Charles Gurrey to create a memorial sculpture. Extracts from Motion's poem Remembrance feature on the sculpture, which resides in the Grove.

The ten Victoria Cross recipients remembered are:

Charles Davis Lucas: Mate (later rising to Rear Admiral) in the Royal Navy. He was the first recipient of the Victoria Cross, receiving the medal from Queen Victoria on 26 June 1857 for action on board HMS Hecla in 1854, during the Crimean War.

Matthew Charles Dixon: Captain (later rising to Major General) in the Royal Regiment of artillery. Captain Dixon gained his Victoria Cross soon after the outbreak of the Crimean War in 1855.

William Temple: Assistant Surgeon in the Royal Regiment of Artillery. Honoured for his courage at the assault at Rangiriri, New Zealand in 1863.

John Duncan Grant: Lieutenant (later rising to Colonel) in the 8th Gurkha Rifles, Indian Army. Awarded for action whilst storming Gyantse Jong fort, Tibet in 1904.

Douglas Walter Belcher: Lance Sergeant (later rising to Captain) in the 1/5th (City of London) Battalion, The London Regiment (The London Rifle Brigade). The first Territorial to receive the Victoria Cross, awarded for his bravery in Belgium in 1915, during World War I.

William Robert Fountaine Addison: Chaplain of the Forces, 4th Class (later 2nd Class) in the Army Chaplains' Department attached to the King's own Royal Lancaster Regiment. Awarded the Victoria Cross for his actions during World War I, at Sanna-i-Yat, Mesopotamia (present-day Iraq).

Eric Stuart Dougall: Acting Captain in the Special Reserve attached to A Battery, 88th Brigade of the Royal Field Artillery. He gained his Victoria Cross for his action at Messines (near Ypres), Belgium in 1918, during World War I.

William Hew Clark-Kennedy: Lieutenant Colonel of the 24th Battalion, Quebec Regiment (Victoria Rifles), Canadian Expeditionary Force. For bravery displayed in France in 1918, during World War I.

Lionel Ernest Queripel: Captain in the Royal Sussex Regiment attached to the 10th Parachute Battalion. Captain Queripel was awarded the Victoria Cross for his action in 1944, during fighting in the Netherlands in World War II.

John Henry Cound Brunt: Temporary Captain in the Sherwood Foresters (The Nottinghamshire and Derbyshire Regiment), attached to the 6th Battalion The Lincolnshire Regiment. He gained his Victoria Cross as a result of his leadership and bravery at Faenza, Italy in 1944, during World War II.

=== Natural play area ===
A natural play area has been constructed for pre-school and younger children.

== Flora ==
Dunorlan has a wide range of habitats ranging from meadows and grass land to hedgerows and shrubberies, walls and flower beds. When Marnock first developed the garden, many of the trees and shrubs were new introductions to the British gardening scene. Marnock's "Gardenesque" style emphasised the beauty of individual trees, making features out of distinctive trees and contrasting tones of various greens against light stonework.

The large deodar cedars Marnock planted by the original drive to the house (now the Pembury Road entrance) still exist today and the restoration work has followed in the spirit of his style.

== Awards ==
- Green Heritage Site Status: a new development under the Green Flag Award scheme, sponsored by English Heritage. It marks the park as an area of national historic interest.
- Green Flag Award recognising the best green spaces in England and Wales.
- National Gold Green Apple Award, awarded to the park in May 2006 for the built environmental and architectural heritage". The National Gold is the highest level that can be awarded by The Green Organisation which launched the award in 2000. Dunorlan was one of 50 winners out of 400 nominations.
