= Singlers Marsh =

Nature reserve in Hertfordshire, England

Coordinates: 51.8354°N 0.2206°W

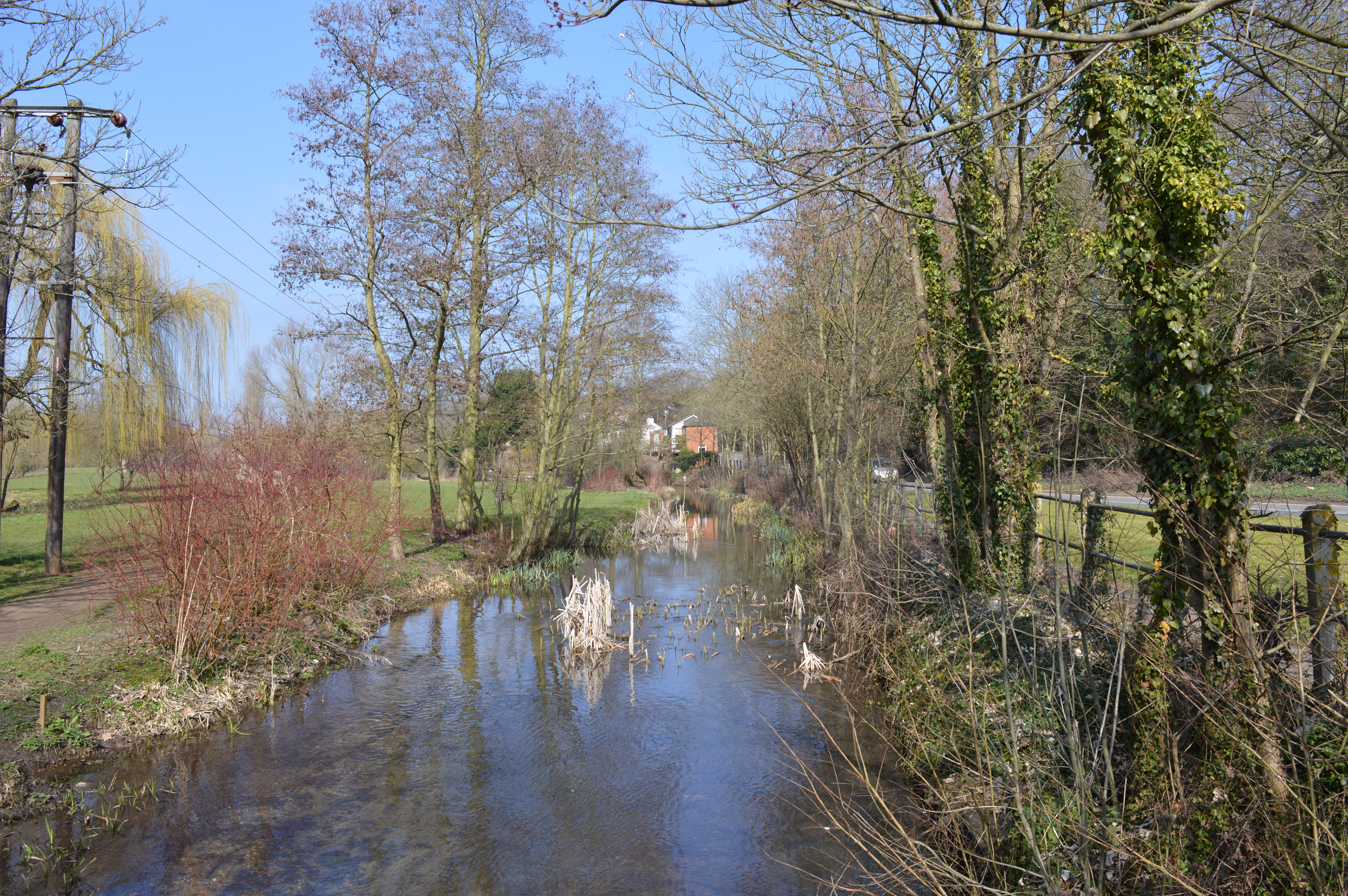
The River Mimram with Singlers Marsh on the left

Singlers Marsh is a 6.3 hectare Local Nature Reserve in Welwyn in Hertfordshire It is owned and managed by Welwyn Hatfield Borough Council.

The site is bordered by the River Mimram. It has grassland, which is managed by cattle grazing and cutting, and areas of willow scrub with some more mature trees. It provides a habitat for a wide range of insects and birds.

There is access by a kissing gate at the corner of Codicote Road and Fulling Mill Lane.
