= Listed buildings in Shadoxhurst =

Civil Parish in Kent, England

Shadoxhurst is a village and civil parish in the Borough of Ashford of Kent, England. It contains one grade II* and 25 grade II listed buildings that are recorded in the National Heritage List for England.

This list is based on the information retrieved online from Historic England.

== Key ==
Grade	Criteria
I	Buildings that are of exceptional interest
II*	Particularly important buildings of more than special interest
II	Buildings that are of special interest

== Listing ==
Name	Grade	Location	Type	Completed (Note: The date given is the date used by Historic England as significant for the initial building or that of an important part in the structure's description.)	Date designated	Grid ref. (Note: The grid reference is based on the British national grid reference system, sometimes known as OSGB36, used by the Ordnance Survey.) Geo-coordinates	Notes	Entry number (Note: The "List Entry Number" is a unique number assigned to each listed building and scheduled monument by Historic England.)	Image	Wikidata
Hornash	II	TN26 1HT			10 October 1980	TQ9782937995; 51°06′26″N 0°49′29″E		1071400	Upload Photo	Q26326546
Handcock's Farmhouse	II	Bethersden Road			14 February 1967	TQ9638138636; 51°06′48″N 0°48′15″E		1071394	Upload Photo	Q26326537
Little Criol	II	Bethersden Road			17 September 1952	TQ9686338219; 51°06′34″N 0°48′39″E		1362706	Upload Photo	Q26644578
Criol Farmhouse	II	Chart Road			10 October 1980	TQ9708138716; 51°06′50″N 0°48′52″E		1362707	Upload Photo	Q26644579
Weatherboarded Barn to East of Criol Farmhouse	II	Chart Road			10 October 1980	TQ9713538713; 51°06′50″N 0°48′54″E		1071395	Upload Photo	Q26326538
Chest Tomb and Railings to Sir Charles Molloy (died 1760) East of the Church of St Peter and St Paul	II	Church Lane			2 February 2000	TQ9725737608; 51°06′14″N 0°48′58″E		1380061	Upload Photo	Q26660278
Church of St Peter and St Paul	II*	Church Lane			14 February 1967	TQ9723737601; 51°06′14″N 0°48′57″E		1326649	Church of St Peter and St Paul More images	Q17556874
Forge House	II	Church Lane			10 October 1980	TQ9723537664; 51°06′16″N 0°48′57″E		1104877	Upload Photo	Q26398843
Green Farm Cottage	II	Church Lane			10 October 1980	TQ9714937714; 51°06′17″N 0°48′53″E		1362671	Upload Photo	Q26644545
Green Farmhouse	II	Church Lane			17 September 1952	TQ9713037640; 51°06′15″N 0°48′52″E		1362670	Upload Photo	Q26644544
Monument to Elizabeth Brown Approx 3 Metres from the South Wall of the Chancel of the Church of St Peter and St Paul (no 3)	II	Church Lane			2 February 2000	TQ9724137595; 51°06′13″N 0°48′58″E		1380064	Upload Photo	Q26660281
Monument to James Swaffer 3 Metres South of Chancel of the Church of St Peter and St Paul (no 2)	II	Church Lane			2 February 2000	TQ9725637591; 51°06′13″N 0°48′58″E		1380063	Upload Photo	Q26660280
Monument to John and Joanna Hynes to South of the Church of St Peter and St Paul (no 1)	II	Church Lane			2 February 2000	TQ9725737595; 51°06′13″N 0°48′58″E		1380062	Upload Photo	Q26660279
Nichols House	II	Church Lane			10 October 1980	TQ9721737672; 51°06′16″N 0°48′56″E		1071398	Upload Photo	Q26326542
Pound House	II	Church Lane			10 October 1980	TQ9713537735; 51°06′18″N 0°48′52″E		1071397	Upload Photo	Q26326541
Quince Cottage	II	Church Lane			10 October 1980	TQ9712137688; 51°06′17″N 0°48′52″E		1326645	Upload Photo	Q26612118
Rosemary Cottage	II	Church Lane			10 October 1980	TQ9726137658; 51°06′15″N 0°48′59″E		1071399	Upload Photo	Q26326545
The Old School	II	Church Lane			10 October 1980	TQ9719537619; 51°06′14″N 0°48′55″E		1071396	Upload Photo	Q26326539
Village Pump	II	Church Lane			10 October 1980	TQ9715937660; 51°06′16″N 0°48′53″E		1104896	Upload Photo	Q26398857
Woodgate House	II	Church Lane			10 October 1980	TQ9717637706; 51°06′17″N 0°48′54″E		1104914	Upload Photo	Q26398873
Manor Farmhouse	II	Ham Street Road			10 October 1980	TQ9915236928; 51°05′49″N 0°50′34″E		1362672	Upload Photo	Q26644546
Weatherboarded Barn to North of Manor Farmhouse	II	Ham Street Road			10 October 1980	TQ9915336971; 51°05′51″N 0°50′34″E		1104856	Upload Photo	Q26398823
Poplar Farm and Projecting Wall	II	Hamstreet Road			10 August 1988	TQ9898736819; 51°05′46″N 0°50′26″E		1362773	Upload Photo	Q26644642
Snailswood Farmhouse	II	Tally Ho Road			10 May 1973	TQ9772538703; 51°06′49″N 0°49′25″E		1104858	Upload Photo	Q26398825
Park Farmhouse	II	Woodchurch Road			14 February 1967	TQ9751938100; 51°06′29″N 0°49′13″E		1071401	Upload Photo	Q26326547
The King's Head Inn	II	Woodchurch Road			10 October 1980	TQ9709438063; 51°06′29″N 0°48′51″E		1362673	The King's Head Inn More images	Q26644547

== See also ==
- Grade I listed buildings in Kent
- Grade II* listed buildings in Kent

== Sources ==
- Newman, John (2012) [1969], Kent: West and the Weald, The Buildings of England, New Haven and London: Yale University Press, ISBN 978-0-300-18509-6
