= Whitewater Dyke =

Coordinates: 51°08′02″N 0°52′20″E

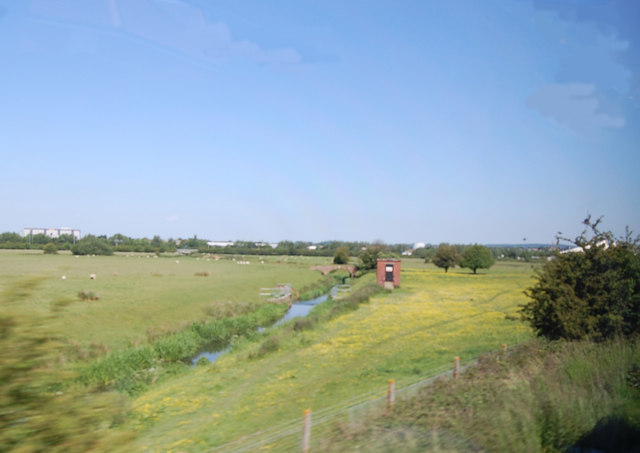

Physical characteristics
- Source
  - location: Shadoxhurst
- Mouth
  - location: Great Stour
- Length: 5.6 km (3.5 mi)

Whitewater Dyke, in relation to the Great Stour and other Rivers of Kent

Whitewater Dyke is a tributary of the Great Stour river, joining with the East Stour and then the Great Stour at Pledge's Mill at the bottom of East Hill in Ashford, Kent, England.

The stream runs from its source near Shadoxhurst, 5.6 kilometres, to the East Stour in Willesborough.
