= Welwyn =

Village in Hertfordshire, England

Coordinates: 51.831°N 0.215°W

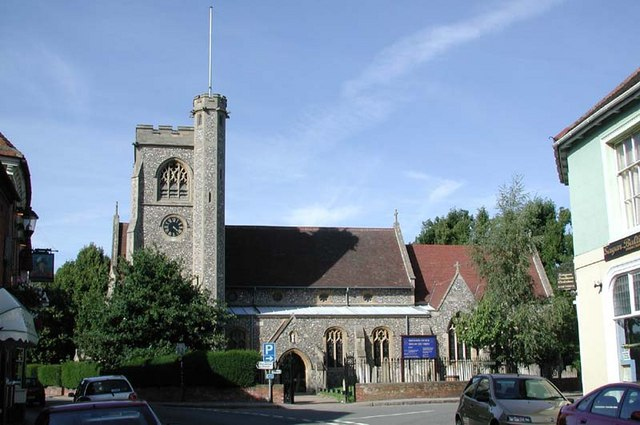
- St Mary the Virgin, Welwyn

- Location within Hertfordshire
- Population: 8,425 (2011 Census)
- OS grid reference: TL225165
- Civil parish: Welwyn
- District: Welwyn Hatfield
- Shire county: Hertfordshire
- Region: East
- Country: England
- Sovereign state: United Kingdom
- Post town: WELWYN
- Postcode district: AL6
- Dialling code: 01438
- Police: Hertfordshire
- Fire: Hertfordshire
- Ambulance: East of England
- UK Parliament: Welwyn Hatfield

Welwyn /ˈwɛlɪn/ is a village and civil parish in Hertfordshire, England. The parish also includes the nearby villages and settlements of Digswell, Mardley Heath and Oaklands. The village is sometimes referred to as Old Welwyn or Welwyn Village, to distinguish it from the much newer and larger settlement of Welwyn Garden City, about a mile to the south. Welwyn Garden City residents often refer to their town as Welwyn, causing them to call the village by the name of Old Welwyn to make a distinction. Residents of the village usually refer to it as Welwyn, or sometimes Welwyn Village to make a distinction.

== Etymology ==
The name is derived from Old English welig meaning "willow", referring to the trees that nestle on the banks of the River Mimram as it flows through the village. The name itself is an evolution from weligun, the dative form of the word, and so is more precisely translated as "at the willows", unlike nearby Willian which is likely to mean simply "the willows".

Through having its name derived from welig rather than sealh (the more commonly cited Old English word for willow), Welwyn is possibly cognate with Heligan in Cornwall whose name is derived from helygen, the Cornish word for willow that shares a root with welig.

The nearby modern village of Digswell (around Welwyn North railway station) was originally called 'High Welwyn' when first developed at the beginning of the 20th century. The original settlement of Digswell was subsumed by the expansion of Welwyn Garden City, and now remains only in the named area of Digswell Park within Welwyn Garden City.

== History ==
Situated in the valley of the River Mimram, Welwyn has hosted human activity since the Palaeolithic with stone tools from that era having been found alongside the river and further inland across the area. Settlement across the area seems to have become established during the Bronze Age according to various recovered artefacts and crop marks left by round barrows and burial mounds from that period.

Iron Age remnants have not been detected until the Late Iron Age, with various local chieftain burials dated to the 1st Century BC gaining national prominence.

The Belgae Celtic culture colonised much of South-Eastern England in the 1st century BC, with Welwyn in the area believed to have been settled by the Catuvellauni tribe.

Following the Roman invasion, Welwyn was settled by the Romans. The area was marshy, and the settlement of Welwyn was a known fording point across the river since at least Roman times when the Roman road through the village was laid out, leading to the establishment of the settlement around the road and the ford. Many Roman artifacts have been found in and around the village, including the remains of several Roman villas close by.

The Welwyn Roman Baths (the remains of a third-century Roman bath house) have been preserved and are open to the public. One particular excavation revealed a large Roman cemetery very close to the site of the current church, which itself is known to date back to at least Saxon times (see below). The church lies directly alongside the route of the Roman road.

The archaeological record in Welwyn is nearly continuous from the late Iron Age (Celtic) through to recorded times, lacking proof of occupation only in the early Anglo-Saxon period. It is therefore likely that Welwyn has been continuously occupied for over 2000 years.

Welwyn was at the heart of the territory of the Anglo-Saxon Tewingas tribe and was the site of an early minster church. In 1990, a proposal was made to rename the village as "Welwyn Minster" to shake off the unpopular "Old" name.

The massacre on St. Brice's day on 13 November 1002, when the Saxons turned on their newly settled Danish neighbours, is said to have commenced near Welwyn. The only known source for this claim is Robert Fabyan's eponymous chronicle, which states it to be "common fame" (ie widespread popular belief) - with Fabyan writing 500 years after the massacre, and with no earlier sources, historians believe it is not possible to rely on this one statement.

A Norman church was built on the site of the Saxon church about 1190. The nave of the present church (St Mary's), was built in the 13th century, the chancel arch being the most obvious early structure. There are two medieval corbels at the east end of the south aisle. Patronage of the church passed through several hands until in 1549 it was sold to the Wilshere family, who lived at The Frythe until relatively recently.

Much later, in the 17th century, as it lies on the old Great North Road, it became an important staging post and a number of coaching inns remain as public houses. After the Great Northern Railway by-passed the village due to the objections of local landowners, Welwyn became less important. Having previously been seen as a town on par with Hatfield and Stevenage, it gradually was seen as a village. The 20th century brought major expansion to the area, as estates to the south, west and north of the village were built up.

== Historical descriptions ==
Despite this long history, at the beginning of the 20th century Welwyn was regarded as a sleepy backwater. One writer wrote that Welwyn, a small town in the Maran Valley, can show little of interest beyond many quaint cottages, and the church.

In 1870–1872, John Marius Wilson's Imperial Gazetteer of England and Wales described Welwyn thus:

WELWYN, a village, a parish, and a sub-district, in Hatfield district, Herts. The village stands on the river Maran, 1¼ mile W of the Great Northern railway, and 5 N of Hatfield; carries on shoe-making and wool-stapling; consists chiefly of two well built streets; and has a head post-office,‡ a r. station with telegraph, two hotels, a police station, a good ancient church, two dissenting chapels, a large national school, an education charity, a workhouse, and charities for the poor £26.—The parish includes Woolmer-Green hamlet, and comprises 2,987 acres. Real property, £7,044. Pop., 1,612. Houses, 320. The property is much subdivided. Danesbury and Frythe are chief residences. The living is a rectory in the diocese of Rochester. Value, £665.* Patron, All Souls College, Oxford. Dr. Young was rector, and wrote here his "Night Thoughts." A national school is at Woolmer-Green, and is used as a chapel of ease.—The sub-district contains 4 parishes, and is a poor-law union. Acres, 6,457. Pop., 2,21 1. Houses, 439.

A fuller history is given in William Page's A History of the County of Hertford in the Victoria History of the Counties of England series.

== Transport ==
Welwyn was noted for its congestion since the beginning of the 20th century, but in 1927 it got what is claimed to be the first by-pass in Britain. The A1 was upgraded to motorway standards north of Welwyn in the 1960s, and in 1973 the motorway was extended south past the village, by-passing the existing by-pass. Today the village is the point where the six-lane motorway merges into four lanes and is the site of extensive traffic jams in the evening peak.

There had been extensive plans to widen the whole road through the area to eight lanes, and to upgrade the existing junction to create a long one-way system running the length of the village. These plans were shelved, but recently plans to provide a climbing lane at least on the section north of the village have been discussed.

Buses are provided by Arriva Shires & Essex and Centrebus, with some assistance from Hertfordshire County Council. Arriva's 300/301 Centraline service links Welwyn and Oaklands to the nearby towns of Stevenage, Welwyn Garden City, Hatfield, St Albans and Hemel Hempstead, as well as neighbouring villages Woolmer Green and Knebworth. The 301 additionally connects both the nearby hospitals in Stevenage and Welwyn Garden City, while the 300 provides a direct link to recreational areas such as Stanborough Lakes in Welwyn Garden City and Verulamium Roman town in St Albans.

Buses run every 15 minutes Monday–Friday, every 20 minutes Saturday, and hourly on Sunday. Additional bi-hourly service 314 is provided by Centrebus, connecting Welwyn to Codicote and Hitchin.

Green Line route 797 used to stop on the by-pass, providing an hourly direct link to areas of North London and the West End, however, the service ceased in September 2016.

The nearest railway station to Welwyn Village is Welwyn North in the nearby village of Digswell, about a mile east from the village, while Knebworth station, one stop nearer Stevenage, is easier for residents of Oaklands to access.

Trains are operated by Great Northern and run every 30 minutes Monday to Saturday south to London King's Cross and north to Hitchin and Stevenage, with an hourly service to Letchworth and Cambridge and to Peterborough. On Sundays an hourly service operates from London to Cambridge only. There is no bus link to Welwyn North station, although buses do link to nearby Welwyn Garden City station and Knebworth station.

== Education ==
There are two state schools in Welwyn and one independent school.

The larger state school is Welwyn St. Mary's Church of England Primary School, situated off London Road which takes children aged between 4 and 11 years of age (Reception to Year 6). Originally built in 1940 as a secondary school, the school was later converted to a primary school. The second is Oaklands Primary School, which incorporates Acorns Preschool and Playgroup.

There is also Tenterfield Nursery School which is situated on London Road close to the primary school. It takes children aged 3 to 4 years of age.

Secondary state education is provided through schools in nearby towns, such as Monks Walk School and Stanborough School, in Welwyn Garden city.

There is an independent all-ages (nursery through to sixth form) coeducational school on the eastern outskirts of Welwyn called Sherrardswood School.

== Sports ==
There are a tennis club, a sports and social club, a bowls club, a football club, and a cricket pitch in the village. These last two are part of Welwyn Garden City-based clubs.

== Local points of interest ==
In the fields surrounding the nearby Danesbury House, now converted into accommodation, is a previously dilapidated and neglected former fernery which has been reinstated to its former glory The Danesbury Fernery – 'the best fernery to be found in the Home Counties' designed by Anthony Parsons (then gardener for the Danesbury Estate) and constructed in a small chalk pit in the grounds of Danesbury Park by the younger James Pulham in 1859. In its day it was well admired, with one W. Robinson (writing in "The English Flower Garden", published in 1883), stating that "In the Home Counties there is probably not a better fernery than at Danesbury."

On the outskirts of Welwyn are the remains of a 3rd-century Roman bath-house, which was once part of the Dicket Mead villa. Local archaeologist Tony Rook discovered the villa and bath-house in the 1960s and excavated them with a team of archaeologists and volunteers from Welwyn Archaeological Society. The remains of the bath-house are now preserved in a vault under the A1 motorway. The site is now run by Welwyn Hatfield Museum Service and is sometimes opened to the public.

The Frythe is a Victorian mansion set in grounds just south of the village. It was privately occupied until 1934, then run as a hotel until the outbreak of World War II. During the war, it was the home of Station IX, a Special Operations Executive (SOE) factory designing and building weapons and tools for SOE activities in occupied Europe. After the war, it became a commercial research facility for first Unilever and then Smith, Kline & French. GlaxoSmithKline, its successor company, wound down the site and sold it in 2010 for residential property development.

Between 1928 and 1951 Welwyn Studios was active, mainly providing supporting features. However, like Welwyn Components (another apparently eponymous business), Welwyn Studios was located in Welwyn Garden City.

Vincent van Gogh walked from London to visit his sister while she was staying in Welwyn; this is commemorated by a blue plaque on a building on Church Street.

== Twinning ==
Welwyn is twinned with the village of Champagne-sur-Oise in the département of Val-d'Oise, just north of Paris. The connection is organised in Welwyn by the Welwyn Anglo-French Twinning Association (WAFTA). The twinning arrangement was entered into in 1973, as a result of a visit to Champagne-sur-Oise by the headmaster and pupils of St Mary's School, Welwyn, setting up a cultural association which has continued since then.

Coincidentally, Champagne-sur-Oise is only about twenty miles from the River Marne, whose name is said to be the origin of the alternative name of Welwyn's Mimram river – the Maran. This connection was brought about by a migration of the Catalauni, the Belgic tribe from the Champagne region of France, into England stretching north of the Thames from London, where the tribe was known as the Catuvellauni. In that respect, WAFTA claims to have resurrected a twinning link first forged nearly 2,000 years ago.

== Notable people ==
- Gabriel Towerson (c. 1635–1697), theologian, was Rector of Welwyn from 1662 until his death.
- Edward Young (1683–1765), poet, philosopher and theologian, author of Night-Thoughts, was a later Rector of Welwyn.
- William Blake (1774–1852), an economist, leased St John's Lodge, Welwyn, with a park of 130 acres, in 1819 and bought it in 1824, changing the name to Danesbury. He was High Sheriff of Hertfordshire in 1836.
- William Wilshere (1806–1867), a Whig politician, lived at The Frythe, near Welwyn, and in 1846 built a Gothic revival country house.
- Sir Arthur Davidson (1856–1922), equerry, grew up in Welwyn.
- Basil Sanderson, 1st Baron Sanderson of Ayot (1894–1971) lived at Welwyn and took his title from Ayot, in the parish.
- Eileen Soper (1905–1990), illustrator, and her sister Eva Soper, also an artist, moved into Wildings, Harmer Green, Welwyn, in 1908, when it was built by their father, the artist George Soper, and lived there for the whole of their lives.
- Alan Stewart Orr (1911–1991), barrister and Lord Justice of Appeal, lived at Harmer Green.
- Sir Martin Gilliat (1913–1993), long-serving Private Secretary to Queen Elizabeth the Queen Mother, lived at the Manor House, Welwyn.
- Matthew Marsh (born 1968), racing driver, is a native of Welwyn.
- Rebecca Llewellyn (born 1985), a tennis player, lives at Welwyn.
- Simon Pearce (born 1946), historian and podcaster.
- Major-General Eric Miles, British Army officer who served in both of the World wars, commanding the 56th (London) Infantry Division in the longest approach march in history.

== See also ==
- St Mary's Church, Welwyn
- Population figures (PDF)
