= James Pulham and Son =

Firm of landscape gardeners and terracotta manufacturers

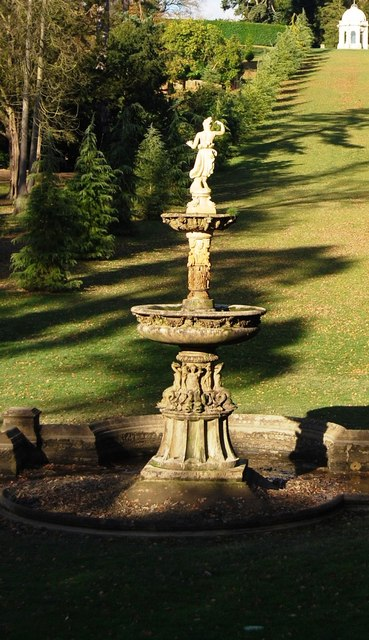
Pulhamite and Terracotta Fountain in Dunorlan Park

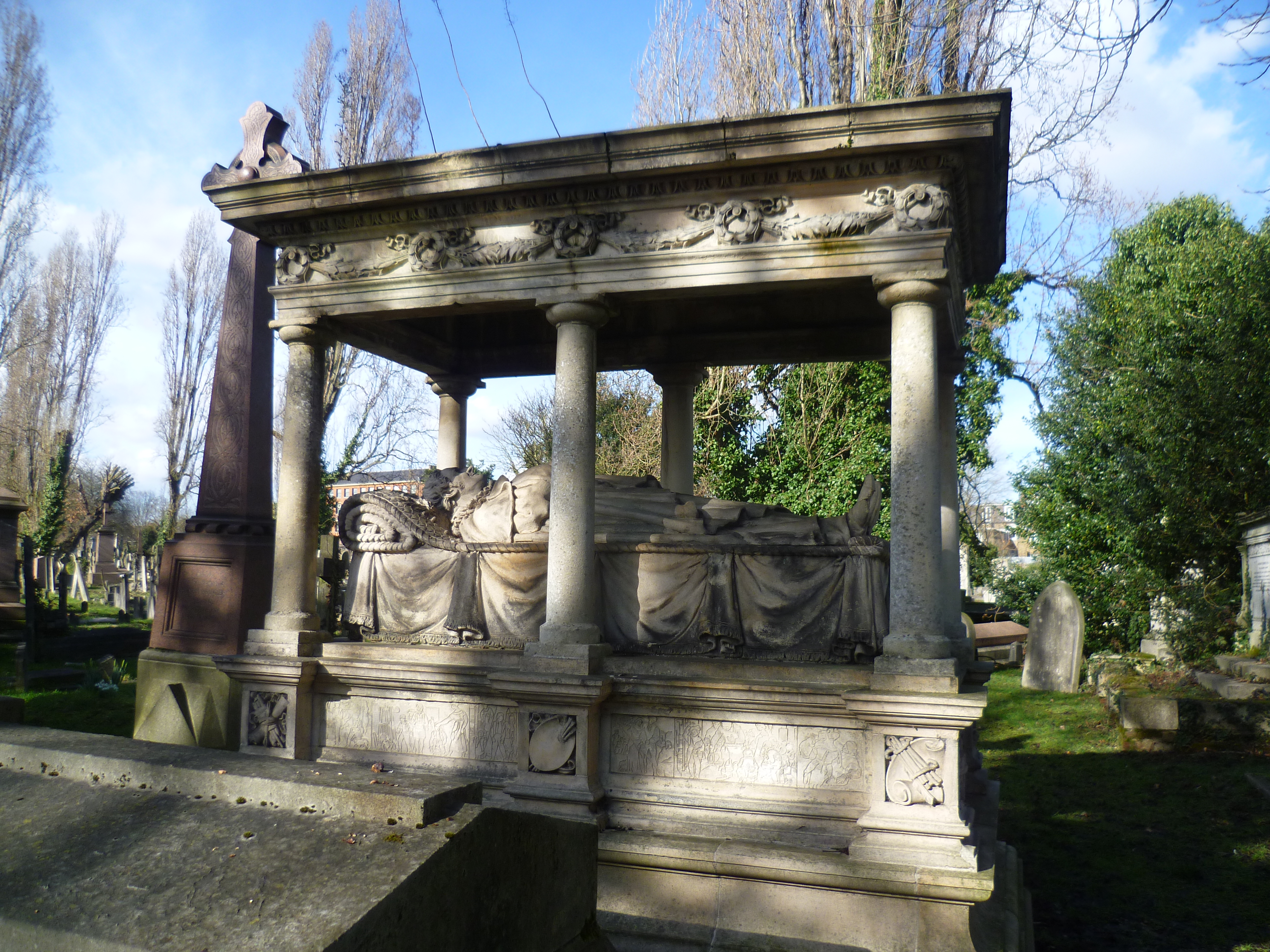
Tomb of William Mulready in Kensal Green Cemetery

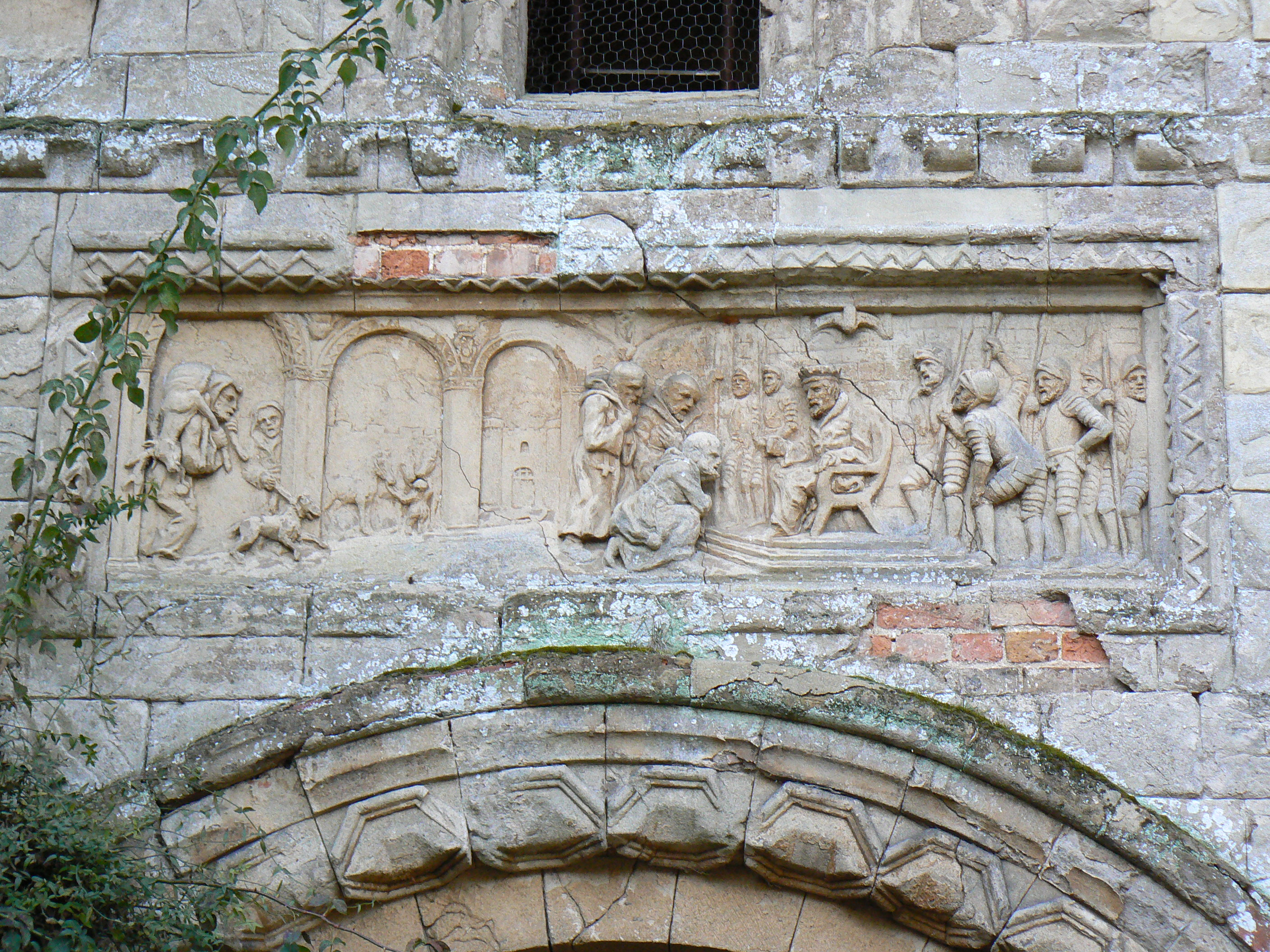
Detail of a folly at Benington Lordship, Hertfordshire. Bricks can be seen beneath the artificial stone

James Pulham and Son was a firm of Victorian landscape gardeners and terracotta manufacturers which exhibited and won medals at London's Great Exhibition of 1851 and 1862 International Exhibition.

== History ==
James Pulham and Son was founded by James Pulham (1765–1830) of Woodbridge in Suffolk, then succeeded by his son James (1793–1838) who was succeeded by his eldest son James (1820–1898) and then by two further generations of eldest sons, all named James. The firm went out of business in 1939.

The firm was best known for the construction of rock gardens, follies and grottoes using both natural stone and their own invention, Pulhamite artificial rock. Pulham and Son also manufactured a wide range of terracotta and Pulhamite garden ornaments, originally at their works in Tottenham, but after 1840 at Broxbourne in Hertfordshire. In 1895 the firm was granted a Royal Warrant by the Prince of Wales, later King Edward VII, and some of their work survives at Sandringham House and Buckingham Palace.

At the Great Exhibition of 1862, the firm exhibited the upper section of the Hebe Fountain, surmounted by a portrayal of the Greek goddess Hebe. James Pullham II (the son) received a recommendation for the architectural decoration in terracotta. The fountain is now at Dunorlan Park, Tunbridge Wells.

At the 1867 Paris Exhibition the company showed the "Preston vase" (several of which were made for the People's Park, Preston), and the Mulready monument. The latter, modelled by Godfrey Sykes consisted of a pedestal 15 feet long and 10 feet wide, supporting an effigy, seven feet long, on a raised bier. It won a silver medal at the exhibition, and was installed at Kensal Green Cemetery on its return from Paris.

== Works ==
- Statues on the Freemasons lodge (The Castle) at Woodridge (1814)
- Statue of Old Father Time on the "Little Castle" at Woodridge (1816)
- Facade of the Female Orphan Asylum at Tottenham
- Bull carving for the "Black Bull Inn" in Holborn
- Bust of Alfred the Great (1825)
- Bust of William Penn (1825)
- Garden layout at Highnam Court
