= Shadoxhurst =

Village in Kent, England

Coordinates: 51.1080°N 0.8195°E

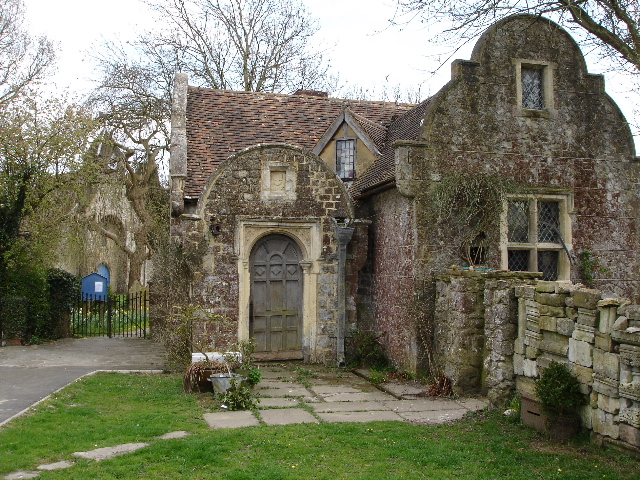
- The former School House

- Location within Kent
- Area: 8.02 km^{2} (3.10 sq mi)
- Population: 1,216 (Civil Parish 2011)
  - Density: 152/km^{2} (390/sq mi)
- OS grid reference: TQ973381
- Civil parish: Shadoxhurst
- District: Ashford
- Shire county: Kent
- Region: South East
- Country: England
- Sovereign state: United Kingdom
- Post town: ASHFORD
- Postcode district: TN26
- Dialling code: 01233
- Police: Kent
- Fire: Kent
- Ambulance: South East Coast
- UK Parliament: Weald of Kent
- Website: Shadoxhurst Parish Council

Shadoxhurst (/ˈʃædɒkshɜːrst/) is a civil parish and a village on the remnant forest the Kent Weald, near Ashford in Kent, England between the Greensand Ridge and Romney Marsh.

== Geography ==
Part of the vestige of county-sized woodland known as The Weald, Shadoxhurst is mostly wooded countryside and farmland. with the Whitewater Dyke (a tributary of the River Stour) rising in the area.

Shadoxhurst is on the Woodchurch to Ashford road.

The village is known as 'the woodland gateway to the countryside' and is surrounded by ancient woodlands.

The area ranges between approximately 40 and 50 metres above sea level.

== History ==
A fairly comprehensive historical overview in Edward Hasted's History and Topography of Kent covers, for instance, the church and the village as well as the recorded history up to the end of the 18th century.

Reverend Charles Rolfe (1800–1877), who worked as the rector of Shadoxhurst's St Peter and Paul Church for thirty-nine years was directly descended from John Rolfe of Heacham who married Chief Powhatan's daughter, Pocahontas on 5 April 1614 in Jamestown, Virginia.

== Amenities ==
The village has a Church of England 13th-century church with lancet windows, to Saints Peter and Paul.

== See also ==
- Listed buildings in Shadoxhurst
