= River Mimram =

River in Hertfordshire, England

Mimram
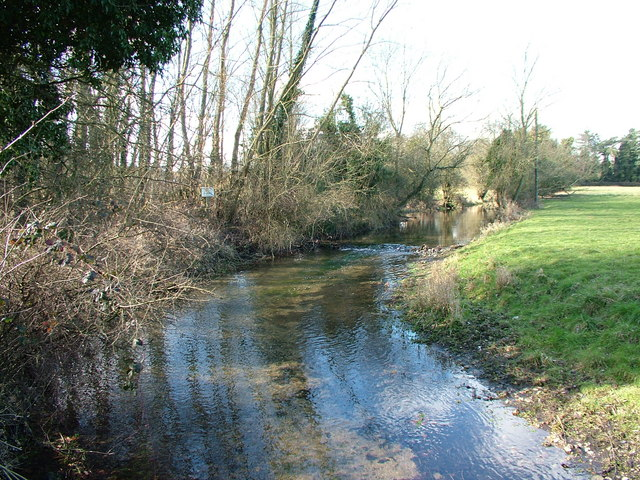
- The river near Tewin

Location
- Country: England

Physical characteristics
- Source
  - location: Nr. Whitwell
  - elevation: 90 m (300 ft)
- Mouth
  - location: Hertford, Hertfordshire into River Lea
  - coordinates: 51°47′35.4″N 0°5′16.5″W
- Length: 20 km (12 mi)

The River Mimram is a chalk stream in Hertfordshire, England. It runs from its source near Whitwell in Hertfordshire to join the River Lea at Hertford.

== Geography ==
Course of the River Mimram

The River Mimram rises from a spring to the north-west of Whitwell, in North Hertfordshire, England. At Whitwell there are watercress beds which have existed since Roman times and these are fed by the same springs. The valley extends northwards where it becomes known as Lilley Bottom. Other sections of the valley are known as Kimpton Bottom and Codicote Bottom.

After flowing through Whitwell, Kimpton Mill (where the Mimram is joined by the River Kym) and Codicote Bottom, the river flows through the middle of Welwyn village before heading between the modern and older Digswell settlements, and then running cross-country through Panshanger Park, a former gravel quarry, until it reaches the River Lea at Hertford.

Although a dry valley to the north, it has been known in particularly wet years for the River Mimram to be extended for several miles by springs in the upper valley. In 2001, in a neighbouring valley to the west a village was flooded. The Valley is the furthest east of all the Chiltern Hills valleys.

== Historical References ==
The name of the Mimram is one of the few toponyms recorded within its local area prior to the compilation of the Domesday Book in 1086. The Anglo-Saxon Chronicle described the building of a burh (a fortified town) at Hertford in 913: "betweox memeran and beneficcan and lygean" (one manuscript spells "memeran" as "maran", and another gives "mæran"), meaning "between the Mimram/Maran and the Beane and the Lea’. On old maps of Hertfordshire, the river is named both as the Mimram and the Maran, with local residents in the 20th century still referring to the surrounding area as the Maran Valley.

== Etymology ==
The name "Mimram" is typically believed to be of Celtic origin. Rutherford Davis states "etymology unknown, but there is little reason to doubt it is Celtic". Etymological connections have been suggested by academic philologists with the River Mint in Westmorland and with North Mymms in south Hertfordshire. There have been suggestions of it being named after a Celtic deity, though no academic sources have been cited for this and the speculation probably stems from a comparison with etymology for the nearby River Beane. Generally, etymologists and philologists have found the name 'Mimram' hard to analyse as there has been so little raw material on which to work until well into the Saxon era, by which time multiple forms of the name appear in records.

Eilert Ekwall believes the Old English version of the name was Memere or Mere (Mære), and that, given the dubious nature of early forms, no etymology can realistically be attempted.

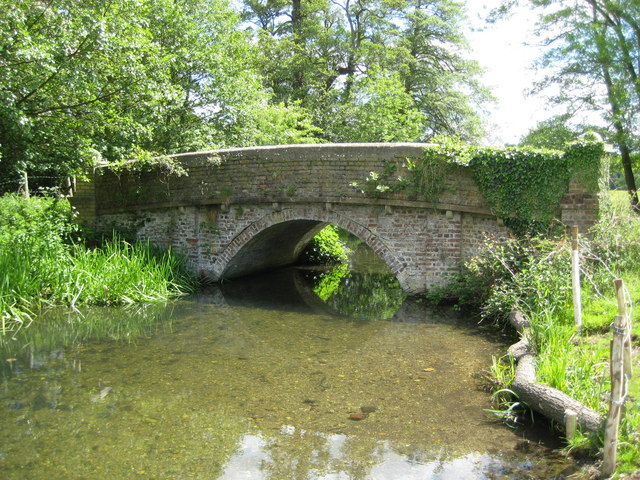
A track bridge crossing the Mimram at Marden Hill

Archaeologist Keith Fitzpatrick-Matthews has written that the Mimram's name is meaningless in Old English and therefore must have Brittonic origins. He writes:

"Mimram" seems to contain Brittonic *mimo-, ‘speaking, murmuring, mumbling’, and *aramo-, ‘gentle, calm, quiet’. The original *Mimaramā would mean the ‘murmuring gentle river’. Speakers of Old English found words with three repeated consonants challenging to say and changed the third ‑m– to –n by a process known as dissimilation.

Historically, the river has also been known by the name "Maran" and many maps from the nineteenth and early twentieth centuries mark the river's name as "Mimram or Maran". Indeed, up until the 1960s and 1970s, most local residents referred the area around it as the Maran Valley rather than the Mimram Valley. Downstream in Digswell there is a homestead property dating from the sixteenth century that has the name "Maran House". It has been speculated that "Maran" may hark back to the homelands of the Catuvellauni tribe, the Celts who came to Hertfordshire from a region of modern-day Belgium and Northern France where the main river is the Marne, after which a whole department of France is named. The prefecture of Marne is Châlons-en-Champagne, formerly called Châlons-sur-Marne - with the name "Châlons" being etymologically derived from the name of the local Belgic tribe of the Catalauni. However, the link between the French Catalauni and the British Catuvellauni is not categorically proven: some texts assume they are connected (including, recently, Graham Robb's "The Ancient Paths"), while others infer a lack of connection from the lack of proof.

== Crossings ==
The Mimram is crossed at Digswell by the Digswell or Welwyn Viaduct, carrying the East Coast Main Line as well as commuter services to Peterborough and Cambridge, as it spans the entire width of the Maran Valley.

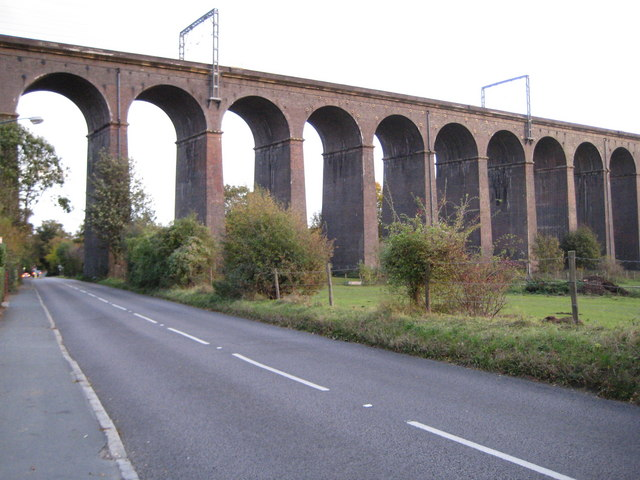
The Digswell Viaduct

The upper reaches of the Mimram are crossed only occasionally by small road bridge or fords (eg at Welwyn and Codicote Bottom). Welwyn Village's three bridge are at Singlers Bridge, on the High Street (previously a ford), and on Mill Lane. The High Street and Mill Lane bridges are relatively recent, making Singlers Bridge the only early bridge within Welwyn. Singlers Bridge is named after Singlers Marsh, which was originally named Single Bridge Mead in the 18th century tithe maps, presumably acknowledging its status as accommodating the only bridge across the Mimram in the area.

Below Welwyn, the river goes into a culvert under the by-pass road and the motorway alongside it, before emerging at Lockleys Park and flowing alongside the road through Tewin Water towards Panshanger Park.

== Literary references ==
The river is the subject (and speaker) of a Stevie Smith poem, The River God. Popular and enjoyable though this poem has been for its many readers, the description of the river in the poem bears little relation to the geography of the actual Mimram.
