= 1994 Enfield London Borough Council election =

1994 local election in England

- 5 May 1994

All 66 seats up for election to Enfield London Borough Council 34 seats needed for a majority
- Registered: 192,473
- Turnout: 90,716, 47.13% (▼0.84)

	First party	Second party	Third party
Leader	Jeffery L. Rodin	Graham Eustance	Unknown
Party	Labour	Conservative	Liberal Democrats
Leader since	1989	1988	Unknown
Leader's seat	Bowes	Willow	Unknown
Last election	32 seats, 41.44%	34 seats, 49.73%	0 seats, 2.81%
Seats before	31	35	0
Seats won	41	25	0
Seat change	▲10	▼10	Steady
Popular vote	80,713	66,930	21,241
Percentage	47.56%	39.44%	12.52%
Swing	▲6.12	▼10.29	▲9.71
Council control before election
Conservative
Council control after election
Labour

The 1994 Enfield Council election took place on 5 May 1994 to elect members of Enfield London Borough Council in London, England. The whole council was up for election and the Labour party gained overall control of the council. This was the first Labour win in Enfield since 1964, ending 26 years of Conservative administration.

== Election result ==
1994 Enfield London Borough Council elections
Party	Seats	Gains	Losses	Net gain/loss	Seats %	Votes %	Votes	+/−
Labour	41	10	0	▲10	62.12	47.56	80,713	▲6.12
Conservative	25	0	10	▼10	37.88	39.44	66,930	▼10.29
Liberal Democrats	0	0	0	Steady	0.00	12.52	21,241	▲9.71
Independent	0	0	0	Steady	0.00	0.23	386	▼0.03
Green	0	0	0	Steady	0.00	0.18	300	▼5.57
Militant Labour	0	0	0	Steady	0.00	0.08	139	New
Total	66						169,709	

== Ward results ==
(*) - Indicates an incumbent candidate

(†) - Indicates an incumbent candidate standing in a different ward

=== Angel Road ===
Angel Road (2)
Party	Candidate	Votes	%	±%
Labour Co-op	John Connew*	1,249	65.62	▲10.51
Labour Co-op	Grave Loake*	1,144		
Conservative	Peter Lovell	497	26.92	▼10.57
Conservative	Mamas Georgiou	484		
Liberal Democrats	Stanley Summerfield	160	7.46	New
Liberal Democrats	Ivor Zeitman	111		
Registered electors		4,808		▼374
Turnout		2,022	42.05	▼5.60
Rejected ballots		4	0.20	Steady
Labour Co-op hold				
Labour Co-op hold				

=== Arnos ===
Arnos (2)
Party	Candidate	Votes	%	±%
Labour	Yasemin Brett	1,345	59.82	▲9.11
Labour	Alan Course*	1,286		
Conservative	Felicity Brown	690	29.77	▼5.03
Conservative	Nadezda Conway^{†} (Note: Conway was a sitting councillor representing the Trent)	619		
Liberal Democrats	Alan Stainer	260	10.41	New
Liberal Democrats	Jagdish Bulsara	197		
Registered electors		5,327		▼351
Turnout		2,334	43.81	▼2.19
Rejected ballots		6	0.26	▼0.08
Labour hold				
Labour hold				

=== Bowes ===
Bowes (2)
Party	Candidate	Votes	%	±%
Labour	Achilleas Georgiou*	1,541	61.92	▼11.67
Labour	Jeffery Rodin*	1,476		
Conservative	Anthony White	660	27.00	▼10.58
Conservative	Gilda Larkin-Sealey	656		
Liberal Democrats	Kevin Keane	296	11.08	New
Liberal Democrats	Francis Jeyarajah	244		
Registered electors		5,644		▼21
Turnout		2,581	45.73	▼1.42
Rejected ballots		5	0.19	▲0.04
Labour hold				
Labour hold				

=== Bullsmoor ===
Bullsmoor (2)
Party	Candidate	Votes	%	±%
Labour	Graham Devitt	1,644	57.15	▲11.98
Labour Co-op	Patrick Cunneen*	1,567		
Conservative	Gillian Shadbolt	1,229	42.85	▼3.66
Conservative	Brian Tarrant*	1,179		
Registered electors		6,047		▲15
Turnout		3,058	50.57	▲0.04
Rejected ballots		10	0.33	▲0.23
Labour gain from Conservative				
Labour Co-op hold				

=== Chase ===
Chase (2)
Party	Candidate	Votes	%	±%
Conservative	John Yates*	1,345	47.04	▼2.96
Conservative	Grace Ford	1,342		
Labour	Doug Taylor	1,013	34.93	▲6.66
Labour	Fiona Renny	983		
Liberal Democrats	Angus Macleod	538	18.03	▲9.80
Liberal Democrats	Michael Wilson	492		
Registered electors		6,100		▼207
Turnout		3,010	49.34	▼1.68
Rejected ballots		4	0.13	▲0.10
Conservative hold				
Conservative hold				

=== Craig Park ===
Craig Park (2)
Party	Candidate	Votes	%	±%
Labour	Mark Fenton*	1,313	71.03	▲7.68
Labour	Alexander Mattingly*	1,236		
Conservative	Michael Harding	393	20.11	▼5.07
Conservative	Nigel Schofield	328		
Liberal Democrats	Josephine Aron	179	8.86	New
Liberal Democrats	David Osman	139		
Registered electors		5,334		▼272
Turnout		1,912	35.85	▼3.27
Rejected ballots		4	0.21	▲0.12
Labour hold				
Labour hold				

=== Enfield Lock ===
Enfield Lock (2)
Party	Candidate	Votes	%	±%
Labour Co-op	Christopher Bond*	1,644	55.26	▲7.59
Labour Co-op	Patrick Horridge*	1,644		
Conservative	Linda Lloyd	1,346	44.74	▲3.36
Conservative	Richard Farmbrough	1,315		
Registered electors		6,842		▼225
Turnout		3,181	46.49	▼2.58
Rejected ballots		10	0.31	▲0.14
Labour Co-op hold				
Labour Co-op hold				

=== Enfield Wash ===
Enfield Wash (2)
Party	Candidate	Votes	%	±%
Labour	Roger Buckley	1,420	61.80	▲7.43
Labour	James Shutt	1,256		
Conservative	Robert Farrow	847	38.20	▲2.18
Conservative	Oliver Grigg	806		
Registered electors		5,657		▼321
Turnout		2,316	40.94	▼2.30
Rejected ballots		14	0.60	▲0.48
Labour hold				
Labour hold				

=== Grange ===
Grange (2)
Party	Candidate	Votes	%	±%
Conservative	Cecil Newell*	1,740	50.66	▼13.52
Conservative	Glynis Vince	1,721		
Liberal Democrats	Christopher Jephcott	1,072	29.70	▲18.51
Liberal Democrats	George Garabetian	957		
Labour	Ronald Daultry	587	16.71	▲2.70
Labour	Theresa Stafford	555		
Green	Olukorede Adeyemi	100	2.93	▼7.69
Registered electors		6,478		▼263
Turnout		3,532	54.52	▼0.23
Rejected ballots		6	0.17	▲0.12
Conservative hold				
Conservative hold				

=== Green Street ===
Green Street (2)
Party	Candidate	Votes	%	±%
Labour	Paul Forrest	1,479	57.86	▲11.92
Labour	Terence Smith	1,442		
Conservative	Bill Price*	1,121	42.14	▼4.02
Conservative	Gloria Price	1,006		
Registered electors		5,668		▼338
Turnout		2,702	47.67	▲1.28
Rejected ballots		12	0.44	▲0.33
Labour gain from Conservative				
Labour hold				

=== Grovelands ===
Grovelands (2)
Party	Candidate	Votes	%	±%
Conservative	Anthony Wright*	1,122	45.51	▼7.97
Conservative	Susan Rust	1,109		
Labour	Claire Jarvis	800	32.30	▲12.02
Labour	Paul Clark	783		
Liberal Democrats	Susan Hill	546	22.19	▲10.88
Liberal Democrats	John Hill	542		
Registered electors		5,569		▼58
Turnout		2,616	46.97	▼2.03
Rejected ballots		7	0.27	▲0.16
Conservative hold				
Conservative hold				

=== Highfield ===
Highfield (2)
Party	Candidate	Votes	%	±%
Labour	Christopher Cole	1,463	53.09	▲11.71
Labour	Ian Borkett	1,375		
Conservative	John Egan*	1,104	38.83	▼8.80
Conservative	Lionel Zetter	971		
Liberal Democrats	George Kounis	262	8.08	New
Liberal Democrats	Hui Ma	170		
Registered electors		5,616		▼249
Turnout		2,826	50.32	▲0.12
Rejected ballots		7	0.25	▲0.08
Labour gain from Conservative				
Labour hold				

=== Hoe Lane ===
Hoe Lane (2)
Party	Candidate	Votes	%	±%
Labour	Geoffrey Southwell*	1,564	55.41	▲1.36
Labour Co-op	Verna Horridge	1,402		
Conservative	Paul Watts* (Note: Watts replaced Cllr Vladimir Goddard after his death in 1990)	1,019	34.42	▼1.80
Conservative	Mark Williams	823		
Liberal Democrats	Robin Wilson	272	10.16	New
Registered electors		6,224		▼344
Turnout		2,834	45.53	▲2.70
Rejected ballots		1	0.04	▼0.14
Labour hold				
Labour Co-op gain from Conservative				

=== Huxley ===
Huxley (2)
Party	Candidate	Votes	%	±%
Labour	George Savva*	1,584	63.12	▲12.61
Labour	Brian Barford^{†} (Note: Barford was a sitting councillor representing the Highfield ward)	1,571		
Conservative	Mary Gosnell	735	28.16	▼11.66
Conservative	Jack Parashou	673		
Liberal Democrats	Helen Osman	228	8.72	New
Liberal Democrats	Stewart Selby	208		
Registered electors		5,783		▼399
Turnout		2,665	46.08	▼3.71
Rejected ballots		6	0.23	▲0.10
Labour hold				
Labour hold				

=== Jubilee ===
Jubilee (2)
Party	Candidate	Votes	%	±%
Labour	Rita Smythe*	1,564	62.31	▲6.33
Labour Co-op	Kathleen Prowse*	1,412		
Conservative	Mark Dingley	738	26.88	▼5.76
Conservative	Mohamed Gulamhusein	546		
Liberal Democrats	Paul Archer	271	10.80	New
Liberal Democrats	Olive Kipling	244		
Registered electors		5,736		▼283
Turnout		2,663	47.43	▲0.79
Rejected ballots		3	0.11	▼0.03
Labour hold				
Labour Co-op hold				

=== Latymer ===
Latymer (2)
Party	Candidate	Votes	%	±%
Labour	Mustafa Ibrahim*	1,395	65.01	▲2.75
Labour	Phillip Sowter	1,372		
Conservative	Terence Smith	458	19.63	▼6.76
Conservative	Frank Thacker	377		
Liberal Democrats	Michael Steel	214	8.83	New
Liberal Democrats	Mohammed Alam	162		
Militant Labour	Darrell Kavanagh	139	6.53	New
Registered electors		5,277		▼490
Turnout		2,241	42.47	▼0.79
Rejected ballots		6	0.27	▲0.23
Labour hold				
Labour hold				

=== Merryhills ===
Merryhills (2)
Party	Candidate	Votes	%	±%
Conservative	Victor James*	1,375	55.12	▼11.13
Conservative	Jennifer Sharkey	1,260		
Labour	Peter King	687	27.31	▲5.85
Labour	Gladys Stanbridge	619		
Liberal Democrats	Terence McGee	425	17.57	New
Liberal Democrats	Paul Price	414		
Registered electors		5,218		▼135
Turnout		2,595	49.73	▼1.92
Rejected ballots		6	0.23	▼0.02
Conservative hold				
Conservative hold				

=== Oakwood ===
Oakwood (2)
Party	Candidate	Votes	%	±%
Conservative	David Conway*	1,076	48.30	▼1.91
Conservative	Patricia Dawson*	999		
Labour	Charles Hislop	824	34.81	▲7.76
Labour	Sukumar Mazumdar	672		
Liberal Democrats	Elizabeth Shakery	375	16.89	▲6.00
Liberal Democrats	Harry Kahn	350		
Registered electors		5,349		▼169
Turnout		2,337	43.69	▼2.44
Rejected ballots		8	0.34	▲0.18
Conservative hold				
Conservative hold				

=== Palmers Green ===
Palmers Green (2)
Party	Candidate	Votes	%	±%
Labour	Neil Aves	1,644	52.99	▲26.78
Labour	Charalambos Charalambous	1,619		
Conservative	Alan Barker	1,029	31.88	▼24.38
Conservative	Clive Goldwater*	935		
Liberal Democrats	Glenton Haddock	467	15.13	▲5.79
Liberal Democrats	Ian Swinton	464		
Registered electors		6,372		▲116
Turnout		3,234	50.75	▼3.42
Rejected ballots		1	0.03	▼0.09
Labour gain from Conservative				
Labour gain from Conservative				

=== Ponders End ===
Ponders End (2)
Party	Candidate	Votes	%	±%
Labour	Elizabeth Costello	1,458	69.71	▲16.58
Labour	Ivor Wiggett	1,424		
Conservative	Andrew Jordon	661	30.29	▼0.15
Conservative	Neil Hulka	590		
Registered electors		5,567		▼239
Turnout		2,231	40.08	▼0.45
Rejected ballots		6	0.27	▼0.58
Labour hold				
Labour hold				

=== Raglan ===
Raglan (2)
Party	Candidate	Votes	%	±%
Conservative	Celia Gooch	1,456	46.72	▼8.65
Conservative	Doreen Mardon*	1,453		
Labour	Elizabeth Mason^{†} (Note: Mason was a sitting councillor representing the Huxley ward)	1,305	41.91	▲11.42
Labour	Anthony Farrington	1,304		
Liberal Democrats	Trevor Stone	358	11.36	New
Liberal Democrats	Timothy Hoof	350		
Registered electors		6,766		▲123
Turnout		3,293	48.67	▼0.46
Rejected ballots		6	0.18	Steady
Conservative hold				
Conservative hold				

=== St Alphege ===
St Alphege (2)
Party	Candidate	Votes	%	±%
Labour	Anthony Kinsler*	1,509	62.07	▲8.21
Labour	Leonard Nicolls*	1,472		
Conservative	Audrey Stacey	712	28.56	▼7.99
Conservative	Roger Vince	660		
Liberal Democrats	William Glass	227	9.37	New
Liberal Democrats	Richard Carrington	222		
Registered electors		5,969		▲70
Turnout		2,536	42.49	▲0.21
Rejected ballots		2	0.08	▲0.04
Labour hold				
Labour hold				

=== St Marks ===
St Marks (2)
Party	Candidate	Votes	%	±%
Labour	David Mason*	1,524	54.70	▲12.99
Labour	Andrew Stafford	1,420		
Conservative	Jacqueline Harding*	1,024	36.53	▼8.40
Conservative	Celia McNeice	941		
Liberal Democrats	Barbara Adams	253	8.77	New
Liberal Democrats	Michael Spinks	218		
Registered electors		5,004		▼259
Turnout		2,825	56.45	▲0.42
Rejected ballots		5	0.18	▲0.11
Labour gain from Conservative				
Labour hold				

=== St Peters ===
St Peters (2)
Party	Candidate	Votes	%	±%
Labour	Colin Robb	1,426	65.25	▲6.32
Labour	Eric Smythe*	1,420		
Conservative	Christine Marlow	546	24.03	▼6.32
Conservative	Harry Marlow	502		
Liberal Democrats	Brendan Malone	241	10.73	New
Liberal Democrats	Shaun Sanders	226		
Registered electors		5,691		▼565
Turnout		2,345	41.21	▲1.06
Rejected ballots		2	0.09	▼0.15
Labour hold				
Labour hold				

=== Southbury ===
Southbury (2)
Party	Candidate	Votes	%	±%
Labour	Stanley Carter	1,579	48.72	▲7.78
Labour	Patrcia Hyder	1,548		
Conservative	Frank Nellis*	1,261	38.47	▼8.78
Conservative	Richard Stacy*	1,209		
Liberal Democrats	Harold Nelson	443	12.81	New
Liberal Democrats	Simon Price	379		
Registered electors		6,447		▼178
Turnout		3,359	52.10	▲1.17
Rejected ballots		2	0.06	▼0.15
Labour gain from Conservative				
Labour gain from Conservative				

=== Southgate Green ===
Southgate Green (2)
Party	Candidate	Votes	%	±%
Conservative	Pamela Adams*	1,089	46.66	▼6.35
Conservative	Peter Elvidge*	1,035		
Labour	Michael Brett^{†} (Note: Brett was a sitting councillor representing the St Peters ward)	792	32.29	▲10.26
Labour	Terence Gueizelar	677		
Liberal Democrats	Bertina Frost	486	21.05	▲10.06
Liberal Democrats	Eric Staunton	472		
Registered electors		5,684		▼128
Turnout		2,438	42.89	▲0.22
Rejected ballots		3	0.12	▲0.08
Conservative hold				
Conservative hold				

=== Town ===
Town (2)
Party	Candidate	Votes	%	±%
Conservative	Audrey Thacker* (Note: Thacker replaced Cllr Roger Brooke after his death in 1990)	1,499	48.93	▼5.97
Conservative	Stephen Wortley^{†} (Note: Wortley was a sitting councillor representing the Grovelands ward)	1,390		
Labour	Frances Howard	1,002	33.76	▲8.05
Labour	Gregory Coombs	992		
Liberal Democrats	James Hanchett	514	17.31	▲7.37
Liberal Democrats	Sheila Macleod	508		
Registered electors		5,650		▼235
Turnout		3,116	55.15	▲3.05
Rejected ballots		8	0.26	▲0.10
Conservative hold				
Conservative hold				

=== Trent ===
Trent (2)
Party	Candidate	Votes	%	±%
Conservative	David Burrowes	1,694	61.11	▼10.28
Conservative	Anne Pearce*	1,580		
Labour	Stephen Mann	558	19.82	▲5.91
Liberal Democrats	Richard Davey	519	19.07	▲10.58
Liberal Democrats	Susan Finlay	503		
Labour	Philip Rowe	503		
Registered electors		6,611		▼69
Turnout		2,858	43.23	▼3.79
Rejected ballots		8	0.28	▲0.15
Conservative hold				
Conservative hold				

=== Village ===
Village (2)
Party	Candidate	Votes	%	±%
Conservative	John Jackson*	1,579	52.79	▼13.69
Conservative	John Wyatt*	1,485		
Labour	William Glover	1,003	32.53	▲8.94
Labour	Katherine Tordoff	884		
Liberal Democrats	John Arend	428	14.68	New
Liberal Democrats	William Meldrum	423		
Registered electors		6,221		▼220
Turnout		3,079	49.49	▼2.02
Rejected ballots		3	0.10	▲0.01
Conservative hold				
Conservative hold				

=== Weir Hall ===
Weir Hall (2)
Party	Candidate	Votes	%	±%
Labour	Sian Walker*	1,431	62.24	▲7.73
Labour	Andreas Constantinides*	1,410		
Conservative	Jean Creber	721	29.92	▼7.06
Conservative	Andrew Murray	644		
Liberal Democrats	Tobias Simon	187	7.84	New
Liberal Democrats	David Springall	171		
Registered electors		5,743		▲108
Turnout		2,454	42.73	▼5.45
Rejected ballots		5	0.20	▼0.13
Labour hold				
Labour hold				

=== Willow ===
Willow (2)
Party	Candidate	Votes	%	±%
Conservative	Graham Eustance*	1,390	40.83	▼15.43
Conservative	Michael Rye	1,255		
Liberal Democrats	Jonathan Chatfield	1,175	35.12	▲25.78
Liberal Democrats	Michael Hopkins	1,100		
Labour	Alan Swain	781	24.04	▼2.17
Labour	Paul Renny	776		
Registered electors		6,066		▼190
Turnout		3,430	56.54	▲2.37
Rejected ballots		4	0.12	Steady
Conservative hold				
Conservative hold				

=== Winchmore Hill ===
Winchmore Hill (2)
Party	Candidate	Votes	%	±%
Conservative	Terence Neville*	1,037	37.28	▼11.95
Conservative	Peter Perryman*	988		
Labour	Keith Blackburn	778	26.65	▲6.51
Labour	Barry Schwartz	670		
Liberal Democrats	Joy Wiggett	397	14.50	▲6.99
Liberal Democrats	Roy Raeburn	391		
Independent	Audrey Kirby	386	14.21	▲3.88
Green	Frederick Clark	200	7.36	▼5.43
Registered electors		5,721		▼249
Turnout		2,641	46.16	▼2.13
Rejected ballots		2	0.08	▼0.06
Conservative hold				
Conservative hold				

=== Worcesters ===
Worcesters (2)
Party	Candidate	Votes	%	±%
Conservative	Mark Evans* (Note: Evans replaced Cllr James Porter after his resignation in 1992)	1,472	43.66	▲6.63
Labour	William Chapman	1,456	44.23	▼3.74
Labour	John Gorton	1,437		
Conservative	Alan Yole	1,384		
Liberal Democrats	Fiona Macleod	416	12.11	▲5.18
Liberal Democrats	Frank Stockwell	375		
Registered electors		6,284		▲78
Turnout		3,452	54.93	▼3.37
Rejected ballots		7	0.20	▲0.06
Conservative hold				
Labour gain from Conservative				
