= 1990 Enfield London Borough Council election =

1990 local election in England

- 3 May 1990

66 seats for election to Enfield London Borough Council 34 seats needed for a majority
- Registered: 199,069
- Turnout: 95,490, 47.97%
	First party	Second party	Third party
Party	Conservative	Labour	Green
Seats won	34	32	0
Seat change	▼5	▲5	Steady
Popular vote	87,167	72,632	10,077
Percentage	49.73%	41.44%	5.75%
before election before election
Conservative
Council control after election
Conservative

The 1990 Enfield Council election took place on 3 May 1990 to elect members of Enfield London Borough Council in London, England. The whole council was up for election and the Conservative Party stayed in overall control of the council.

== Election result ==
1990 Enfield London Borough Council elections
Party	Seats	Gains	Losses	Net gain/loss	Seats %	Votes %	Votes	+/−
Conservative	34	0	5	▼5	51.51	49.73	87,167	
Labour	32	5	0	▲5	48.49	41.44	72,632	
Green	0	0	0	Steady	0.00	5.75	10,077	
Liberal Democrats	0	0	0	Steady	0.00	2.81	4,931	
Independent	0	0	0	Steady	0.00	0.26	463	
Total	66						175,270	

== Ward results ==
(*) - indicates an incumbent candidate

(†) - indicates an incumbent candidate standing in a different ward

=== Angel Road ===
Angel Road (2)
Party	Candidate	Votes	%
Labour	John A. Connew*	1,343	55.11
Labour	Grace A. Loake	1,203	
Conservative	Aneurin J.M. Preece	890	37.49
Conservative	Nigel C. Schofield* (Note: Schofield replaced Cllr. Sheila A. Camp after her resignation in 1987)	841	
Green	James P. Dillon	171	7.40
Registered electors		5,182	
Turnout		2,469	47.65
Rejected ballots		5	0.20
Labour hold			
Labour gain from Conservative			

=== Arnos ===
Arnos (2)
Party	Candidate	Votes	%
Labour	Allan W. Course*	1,316	50.71
Labour	Josepha G. Scotney*	1,260	
Conservative	Robert G. Hayward	960	34.80
Conservative	Ali Ahmet	808	
Green	Philip W. Chamberlain	368	14.49
Registered electors		5,678	
Turnout		2,612	46.00
Rejected ballots		9	0.34
Labour hold			
Labour hold			

=== Bowes ===
Bowes (2)
Party	Candidate	Votes	%
Labour	Jeffrey L. Rodin*	1,323	50.25
Labour	Achilleas Georgiou	1,279	
Conservative	Dogan Delman	1,031	37.58
Conservative	Geoffrey A. White	915	
Green	Trevor K. Halvorsen	315	12.17
Registered electors		5,665	
Turnout		2,671	47.15
Rejected ballots		4	0.15
Labour hold			
Labour hold			

=== Bullsmoor ===
Bullsmoor (2)
Party	Candidate	Votes	%
Conservative	Brian S. Tarrant*	1,429	46.51
Labour	Patrick M. Cunneen	1,369	45.17
Conservative	Brian J. Wallace	1,289	
Labour	Andrew Figiel	1,271	
Green	James F. Francey	243	8.32
Registered electors		6,032	
Turnout		3,048	50.53
Rejected ballots		3	0.10
Conservative hold			
Labour gain from Conservative			

=== Chase ===
Chase (2)
Party	Candidate	Votes	%
Conservative	Ian M. McCann*	1,671	50.00
Conservative	John M. Yates	1,597	
Labour	Sarah E. Doyle	972	28.27
Labour	Terence L. Smith	875	
Green	Sian Mills	301	9.21
Liberal Democrats	Angus M. Macleod	282	8.23
Liberal Democrats	Alfirda A. Lee	255	
Independent	Terrence McManus	140	4.28
Registered electors		6,307	
Turnout		3,218	51.02
Rejected ballots		1	0.03
Conservative hold			
Conservative hold			

=== Craig Park ===
Craig Park (2)
Party	Candidate	Votes	%
Labour	Mark Fenton*	1,385	63.35
Labour	Alexander W. Mattingly*	1,266	
Conservative	Michael J. Harding	549	25.18
Conservative	Carol A. Crump	505	
Green	Stuart S. Penn	240	11.47
Registered electors		5,606	
Turnout		2,193	39.12
Rejected ballots		2	0.09
Labour hold			
Labour hold			

=== Enfield Lock ===
Enfield Lock (2)
Party	Candidate	Votes	%
Labour	Christopher J. Bond*	1,627	47.67
Labour	Patrick R. Horridge	1,586	
Conservative	Grace M. Ford*	1,465	41.38
Conservative	Paul A. Watts	1,324	
Green	Matthew P.J. Bright	369	10.95
Registered electors		7,067	
Turnout		3,468	49.07
Rejected ballots		6	0.17
Labour gain from Conservative			
Labour hold			

=== Enfield Wash ===
Enfield Wash (2)
Party	Candidate	Votes	%
Labour	Sheila M. Grayston* (Note: Grayston replaced Cllr. Wilfred E. Davies after their death in 1986)	1,379	54.37
Labour	Michael Malina	1,257	
Conservative	Donald E. Scott	886	36.02
Conservative	Nicolas R. Parker	859	
Green	Donal J. Finn	233	9.61
Registered electors		5,978	
Turnout		2,585	43.24
Rejected ballots		3	0.12
Labour hold			
Labour hold			

=== Grange ===
Grange (2)
Party	Candidate	Votes	%
Conservative	Cecil A. Newell	2,483	64.18
Conservative	Ronald W. Sands	2,462	
Labour	Ronald Daultry	621	14.01
Labour	Walter J. Sheffield	459	
Liberal Democrats	Cyril G. Jones	431	11.19
Green	Annette C. Barber	409	10.62
Registered electors		6,741	
Turnout		3,660	54.29
Rejected ballots		2	0.05
Conservative hold			
Conservative hold			

=== Green Street ===
Green Street (2)
Party	Candidate	Votes	%
Conservative	William Price*	1,314	46.16
Labour	David R.C. Beadle	1,291	45.94
Labour	Anne M. Thomas	1,210	
Conservative	David A. Sutton	1,200	`
Green	Darryl Marks	215	7.90
Registered electors		6,006	
Turnout		2,786	46.39
Rejected ballots		3	0.11
Conservative hold			
Labour hold			

=== Grovelands ===
Grovelands (2)
Party	Candidate	Votes	%
Conservative	Anthony D. Wright	1,535	53.48
Conservative	Stephen M. Wortley* (Note: Wortley replaced Cllr. Peter S. Matthew after his death in 1988)	1,445	
Labour	Claire Davey	590	20.28
Labour	Philip Rowe	539	
Green	Christopher R.E. Spencer	416	14.93
Liberal Democrats	Margaret J. Steel	324	11.31
Liberal Democrats	Douglas B.L. Gifford	305	
Registered electors		5,627	
Turnout		2,757	49.00
Rejected ballots		3	0.11
Conservative hold			
Conservative hold			

=== Highfield ===
Highfield (2)
Party	Candidate	Votes	%
Conservative	John P. Egan	1,495	47.63
Labour	Brian Barford	1,229	41.38
Conservative	Raj K. Rampal	1,200	
Labour	Barry Schwrtz	1,112	
Green	David T. Newport	311	10.99
Registered electors		5,865	
Turnout		2,944	50.20
Rejected ballots		5	0.17
Conservative hold			
Labour gain from Conservative			

=== Hoe Lane ===
Hoe Lane (2)
Party	Candidate	Votes	%
Labour	Geoffrey C.L. Southwell	1,426	54.05
Labour	Vladimir C. Goddard	1,417	
Conservative	David W. Dollemore	974	36.22
Conservative	Neil W. Hulka	931	
Green	Marghanita C.P.H. Hollands	256	9.73
Registered electors		6,568	
Turnout		2,813	42.83
Rejected ballots		5	0.18
Labour hold			
Labour hold			

=== Huxley ===
Huxley (2)
Party	Candidate	Votes	%
Labour	George A. Savva*	1,513	50.51
Labour	Elizabeth J. Mason	1,465	
Conservative	Panayiota Georgiou * (Note: Panayiota Georgiou replaced Cllr. Hugh P. Jarvis after his resignation in 1987)	1,205	39.82
Conservative	Celia A. Gooch	1,142	
Green	Avril W. Evans	285	9.67
Registered electors		6,182	
Turnout		3,078	49.79
Rejected ballots		4	0.13
Labour hold			
Labour gain from Conservative			

=== Jubilee ===
Jubilee (2)
Party	Candidate	Votes	%
Labour	Kathleen L. Prowse*	1,573	55.98
Labour	Rita A. Smythe^{†} (Note: Smythe was a sitting councillor representing the St Alphege ward)	1,458	
Conservative	Mark L. Dingley	960	32.64
Conservative	Janice A. Gayler	808	
Green	Lynnette E. Reeve-Jones	308	11.37
Registered electors		6,019	
Turnout		2,807	46.64
Rejected ballots		4	0.14
Labour hold			
Labour hold			

=== Latymer ===
Latymer (2)
Party	Candidate	Votes	%
Labour	Brian G. Grayston*	1,652	62.26
Labour	Mustafa Ibrahim	1,287	
Conservative	Adrena Smith	653	26.39
Conservative	Mamas Georgiou	593	
Green	Norman C.B. Adams	268	11.35
Registered electors		5,767	
Turnout		2,495	43.26
Rejected ballots		1	0.04
Labour hold			
Labour hold			

=== Merryhills ===
Merryhills (2)
Party	Candidate	Votes	%
Conservative	Ian P.C. Black	1,859	66.25
Conservative	Victor G. James	1,753	
Labour	Stanley Carter	662	21.46
Labour	Richard F. Simmons	508	
Green	Susan F.S. Barnett	335	12.29
Registered electors		5,353	
Turnout		2,765	51.65
Rejected ballots		7	0.25
Conservative hold			
Conservative hold			

=== Oakwood ===
Oakwood (2)
Party	Candidate	Votes	%
Conservative	David A. Conway*	1,373	50.21
Conservative	Patricia A. Dawson*	1,255	
Labour	Andrew N. Gilbert	784	27.05
Labour	Sukumar Mazumdar	631	
Green	Miriam F. Kennet	310	11.85
Liberal Democrats	Ian D. Swinton	285	10.89
Registered electors		5,518	
Turnout		2,546	46.13
Rejected ballots		4	0.16
Conservative hold			
Conservative hold			

=== Palmers Green ===
Palmers Green (2)
Party	Candidate	Votes	%
Conservative	Clive C. Goldwater^{†} (Note: Goldwater was a sitting councilor representing the Raglan ward)	1,364	40.37
Conservative	Ormand F.S. Lusk	1,285	
Labour	Christopher Cole	1,090	32.15
Labour	Paul G. Clark	1,020	
Green	Francis Sealey	624	19.01
Liberal Democrats	Michael C.F. Steel	278	8.47
Registered electors		6,531	
Turnout		3,019	46.23
Rejected ballots		1	0.03
Conservative hold			
Conservative hold			

=== Ponders End ===
Ponders End (2)
Party	Candidate	Votes	%
Labour	Seton A.R.O. During	1,208	53.13
Labour	Mobin U. Ahmed	1,166	
Conservative	Philip J. Cox	693	30.44
Conservative	James B. Steven	667	
Green	John F. Linden	367	16.43
Registered electors		5,806	
Turnout		2,353	40.53
Rejected ballots		20	0.85
Labour hold			
Labour hold			

=== Raglan ===
Raglan (2)
Party	Candidate	Votes	%
Conservative	Harry W. Corpe*	1,826	55.37
Conservative	Doreen Mardon	1,770	
Labour	Terence M. O'Hehir	1,003	30.49
Labour	Kate Tordoff	977	
Green	Michael F. Bloom	459	14.14
Registered electors		6,643	
Turnout		3,264	49.13
Rejected ballots		6	0.18
Conservative hold			
Conservative hold			

=== St Alphege ===
St Alphege (2)
Party	Candidate	Votes	%
Labour	Anthony Kinsler	1,300	53.86
Labour	Leonard V. Nicolls*	1,228	
Conservative	Kenneth J. Edwards	911	36.55
Conservative	Felicity A. Brown	805	
Green	James C. Fleming	225	9.59
Registered electors		5,899	
Turnout		2,494	42.28
Rejected ballots		1	0.04
Labour hold			
Labour hold			

=== St Marks ===
St Marks (2)
Party	Candidate	Votes	%
Conservative	Jacqueline G. Harding*	1,396	44.93
Labour	David J. Mason	1,283	41.71
Conservative	Henry J. Mardon*	1,228	
Labour	Zenon Antoniou	1,153	
Green	Denise R.A. Vallance	390	13.36
Registered electors		5,263	
Turnout		2,949	56.03
Rejected ballots		2	0.07
Conservative hold			
Labour gain from Conservative			

=== St Peters ===
St Peters (2)
Party	Candidate	Votes	%
Labour	Eric J.C. Smythe*	1,414	58.93
Labour	Michael Brett	1,377	
Conservative	Stephen J. Cooper	756	30.35
Conservative	Henry B. Carse	681	
Green	Anthea A. Tulloch	254	10.72
Registered electors		6,256	
Turnout		2,512	40.15
Rejected ballots		6	0.24
Labour hold			
Labour hold			

=== Southbury ===
Southbury (2)
Party	Candidate	Votes	%
Conservative	Frank Nellis*	1,587	47.25
Conservative	Richard C. Stacy*	1,527	
Labour	Katherine Alexander	1,437	40.94
Labour	Thomas G. Oswald	1,261	
Green	Ashley J.E. Blanks	389	11.81
Registered electors		6,625	
Turnout		3,374	50.93
Rejected ballots		7	0.21
Conservative hold			
Conservative hold			

=== Southgate Green ===
Southgate Green (2)
Party	Candidate	Votes	%
Conservative	Pamela J. Adams	1,459	53.01
Conservative	Peter G. Elvidge*	1,395	
Labour	Yasemin Brett	598	22.03
Labour	Douglas A. Ewen	588	
Green	Peter N. Riddington	376	13.97
Liberal Democrats	John E. Hill	296	10.99
Registered electors		5,812	
Turnout		2,480	42.67
Rejected ballots		1	0.04
Conservative hold			
Conservative hold			

=== Town ===
Town (2)
Party	Candidate	Votes	%
Conservative	Roger D. Brooke*	1,733	54.90
Conservative	John R. Boast*	1,637	
Labour	Douglas Taylor	820	25.71
Labour	Paul A. Renny	758	
Liberal Democrats	Sheila M. Macleod	325	9.94
Green	Anthony W. Thomas	290	9.45
Liberal Democrats	Sandra R. Mason	284	
Registered electors		5,885	
Turnout		3,066	52.10
Rejected ballots		5	0.16
Conservative hold			
Conservative hold			

=== Trent ===
Trent (2)
Party	Candidate	Votes	%
Conservative	Nadezda Conway*	2,192	71.39
Conservative	Anne M.D. Pearce*	2,180	
Labour	Ian R. Davis	461	13.91
Labour	Marion Rodin	391	
Liberal Democrats	Catherine G. Edwards	274	8.49
Liberal Democrats	Susan W. Finlay	246	
Green	Marcia L. Riddington	190	6.21
Registered electors		6,680	
Turnout		3,141	47.02
Rejected ballots		4	0.13
Conservative hold			
Conservative hold			

=== Village ===
Village (2)
Party	Candidate	Votes	%
Conservative	John W.E. Jackson*	2,260	66.48
Conservative	John A. Wyatt*	2,051	
Labour	Roger Buckley	805	23.59
Labour	William H. Glover	724	
Green	Frederick W. Clark	322	9.93
Registered electors		6,441	
Turnout		3,318	51.51
Rejected ballots		3	0.09
Conservative hold			
Conservative hold			

=== Weir Hall ===
Weir Hall (2)
Party	Candidate	Votes	%
Labour	Sian M. Walker*	1,395	54.51
Labour	Andreas Constantinides*	1,384	
Conservative	Jean B. Creber	1,001	36.98
Conservative	Paul A. Miller	884	
Green	Eric M. Chantler	217	8.51
Registered electors		5,635	
Turnout		2,715	48.18
Rejected ballots		9	0.33
Labour hold			
Labour hold			

=== Willow ===
Willow (2)
Party	Candidate	Votes	%
Conservative	Graham G. Eustance*	1,938	56.26
Conservative	Phyllis Oborn	1,784	
Labour	Finola Byrne	890	26.21
Labour	Alan P. Swain	844	
Liberal Democrats	Anne Dorothy Viney	320	9.34
Liberal Democrats	Frank H.C. Stockwell	298	
Green	Helen Aresti	271	8.19
Registered electors		6,256	
Turnout		3,389	54.17
Rejected ballots		4	0.12
Conservative hold			
Conservative hold			

=== Winchmore Hill ===
Winchmore Hill (2)
Party	Candidate	Votes	%
Conservative	Terence F. Neville*	1,583	49.23
Conservative	Peter Perryman*	1,496	
Labour	Zena Lebow	752	20.14
Labour Co-op	Gladys E.M. Stanbridge	508	
Green	Ashley P.J. Backhouse	400	12.79
Independent	Audrey E. Kirby	323	10.33
Liberal Democrats	David A. Osman	235	7.51
Registered electors		5,970	
Turnout		2,883	48.29
Rejected ballots		4	0.14
Conservative hold			
Conservative hold			

=== Worcesters ===
Worcesters (2)
Party	Candidate	Votes	%
Conservative	Andrew C. Nicholas*	1,713	47.97
Conservative	James E. Porter*	1,706	
Labour	Elizabeth M. Costello	1,325	37.03
Labour	Philip W. Manning	1,314	
Green	Liana M.E. Blanks	288	8.08
Liberal Democrats	Fiona J. Macleod	285	6.93
Liberal Democrats	Eileen E. Robeson	208	
Registered electors		6,206	
Turnout		3,618	58.30
Rejected ballots		5	0.14
Conservative hold			
Conservative hold			
