= Southgate and Wood Green =

UK Parliament constituency (since 2024)

- Borough constituency for the House of Commons
- Boundary of Southgate and Wood Green in Greater London
- County: Greater London
- Electorate: 76,034 (2023)

Current constituency
- Created: 2024
- Member of Parliament: Bambos Charalambous (Labour)
- Seats: One
- Created from: Enfield Southgate, Hornsey and Wood Green & Tottenham

Southgate and Wood Green is a constituency of the House of Commons in the UK Parliament, created by the 2023 Periodic Review of Westminster constituencies. It was first contested at the 2024 general election. It is represented by Bambos Charalambous (Labour), who was previously the MP for Enfield Southgate.

== Constituency profile ==
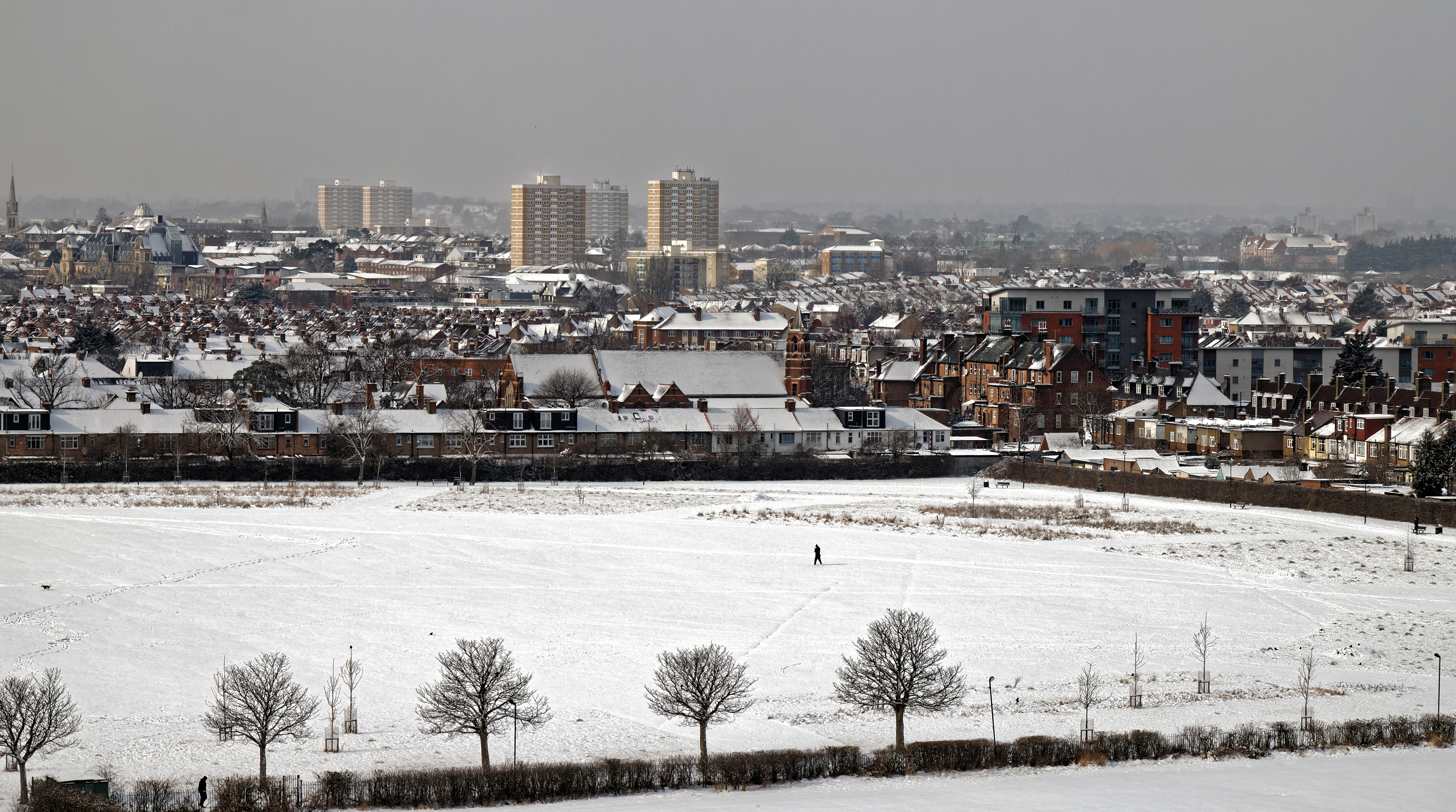
Wood Green

Southgate and Wood Green is a constituency in Greater London in England, covering parts of the boroughs of Enfield and Haringey. It includes the areas of Southgate, Wood Green, Oakwood, Hadley Wood and part of Cockfosters.

This is a suburban constituency on the outskirts of London, located around 8 miles (13 km) north of the city centre. Wood Green was mostly built during the Victorian era whilst Southgate is predominantly an interwar development. The area is well-connected by rail to the rest of London and the rest of the country; the East Coast Main Line and the Picadilly line both pass through here. The constituency contains a variety of housing types; Wood Green is highly-deprived and more urban in character with many residents living in dense, socially-rented flats or terraces, whilst Southgate and Hadley Wood are wealthier with more detached and semi-detached homes. House prices across the constituency are generally similar to the rest of London and the average price is nearly double the UK average.

Southgate and Wood Green has a large population of middle-aged adults and a low proportion of retirees. Residents' rates of income and homeownership are similar to the rest of London, meaning high income and low homeownership compared to the rest of the UK, and the child poverty rate is below-average. Residents have average levels of education and a high proportion work in the business administration and retail sectors. The percentage claiming unemployment benefits is high.

Southgate and Wood Green is ethnically diverse. White people made up 58% of the population at the 2021 census, around half of whom were of non-British origin, including large Polish, Bulgarian and Cypriot communities. Asians were 13% of the population, Black people were 12%, and other ethnic groups, which included many Turks, were 11%.

At the local borough council level, Wood Green is represented by Labour Party and Green Party councillors whilst the rest of the constituency elected Conservatives. Voters in Southgate and Wood Green strongly supported remaining in the European Union in the 2016 referendum; an estimated 66% voted to remain compared to the UK-wide figure of 48%.

== Boundaries ==
Map of boundaries from 2024

The constituency is composed of the following wards:

- The London Borough of Enfield wards of: Arnos Grove; Bowes; Cockfosters; New Southgate; Oakwood; Palmers Green; Southgate.
- The London Borough of Haringey wards of: Bounds Green; Noel Park; White Hart Lane; Woodside.

It comprises the following areas:

- The majority of the abolished constituency of Enfield Southgate in the Borough of Enfield.
- Minority part (Wood Green) of the abolished constituency of Hornsey and Wood Green in the Borough of Haringey.
- The White Hart Lane ward from the constituency of Tottenham in the Borough of Haringey.

== Members of Parliament ==
| Election | Member | Party |
|---|---|---|
| 2024 | Bambos Charalambous | Labour |

== Elections ==
=== Elections in the 2020s ===
General election 2024: Southgate and Wood Green
| Party | Candidate | Votes | % | ±% |
|---|---|---|---|---|
| Labour | Bambos Charalambous | 23,337 | 51.1 | –6.7 |
| Conservative | Eric Sukumaran | 8,037 | 17.6 | –11.0 |
| Green | Charith Gunawardena | 5,607 | 12.3 | +9.8 |
| Liberal Democrats | Lauren Fulbright | 3,925 | 8.6 | –1.3 |
| Reform | Lucy O'Sullivan | 3,147 | 6.9 | +5.6 |
| Workers Party | Geoff Moseley | 833 | 1.8 | N/A |
| TUSC | Karl Vidol | 785 | 1.7 | N/A |
| Majority | | 15,300 | 33.5 | +4.3 |
| Turnout | | 45,671 | 58.9 | –10.4 |
| Registered electors | | 77,542 | | |
| Labour hold | | Swing | ▲2.2 | |

=== Elections in the 2010s ===
2019 notional result
| Party | Vote | % |
|---|---|---|
| Labour | 30,465 | 57.8 |
| Conservative | 15,051 | 28.6 |
| Liberal Democrats | 5,242 | 9.9 |
| Green | 1,294 | 2.5 |
| Brexit Party | 660 | 1.3 |
| Turnout | 52,712 | 69.3 |
| Electorate | 76,034 | |
