= Alessandro Georgiou =

Member of the London Assembly

Cllr Alex Georgiou AM
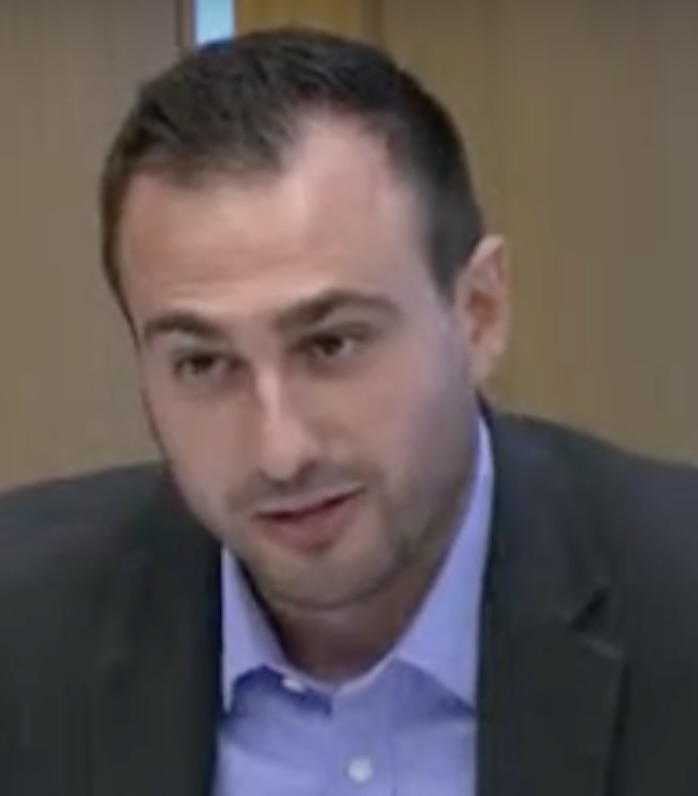
- Georgiou in 2024

Leader of Enfield London Borough Council
- Incumbent
- Assumed office 27 May 2026
- Deputy: Michael Rye
- Preceded by: Ergin Erbil

Member of the London Assembly as an additional member
- Incumbent
- Assumed office 6 May 2024
- Preceded by: Emma Best

Leader of the Conservative Party on Enfield Council
- Incumbent
- Assumed office May 2022
- Deputy: Michael Rye
- Preceded by: Joanne Laban

Member of Enfield Council for Cockfosters
- Incumbent
- Assumed office 4 May 2018
- Preceded by: Michael Lavender

Member of Enfield Council for Southgate Green
- In office 23 May 2014 – 3 May 2018
- Preceded by: Ann Zinkin
- Succeeded by: Anne Brown

Personal details
- Born: Alessandro Ionas Georgiou; 16 December 1992 (age 33) Gordon Hill, London, England
- Party: Conservative
- Education: Broomfield School; Arnos Grove; University of Essex

Alessandro Ionas Georgiou (born 16 December 1992) is a British politician who has served as leader of Enfield London Borough Council since May 2026. A member of the Conservative Party, he has also served as a London-wide Member of the London Assembly (AM) since 2024.

He has served as a councillor for Cockfosters on Enfield Council since 2018, having previously served as a councillor for Southgate Green from 2014 to 2018. Prior to taking control of Enfield Council in May 2026, he served as Leader of the Opposition.

== Political career ==
=== Enfield Council (2014-present) ===
Georgiou entered local politics in May 2014 when he was elected to Enfield Council, initially representing the ward of Southgate Green.

In 2015, Labour Enfield Council member Andrew Stafford, then head of finance, told Georgiou to "sit down, you cunt". This prompted all 24 Conservative councillors to walk out of the meeting.

Following local boundary changes and elections in 2018, he successfully contested and won in the Cockfosters ward, which he continues to represent, having been re-elected in 2022 and 2026.

In May 2022, Georgiou was chosen as leader of the Conservative Party group on Enfield Council, thereby becoming the Leader of the Opposition to the ruling Labour administration. During his tenure in opposition, he prominently campaigned against high-rise tower block developments, the implementation of Low Traffic Neighbourhoods (LTNs), and proposed developments on the local Green Belt.

Georgiou has had a highly contentious relationship with his predecessor Ergin Erbil, former Labour leader of Enfield Council. An online spat occurred in October 2025 in an exchange on social media regarding Enfield's local development plan. Erbil, then leader of the council, championed building thousands of council homes on Green Belt land, specifically targeting Crews Hill Golf Course, which is owned by the council.

Erbil initiated the online dispute on X by calling Georgiou "a clown" and telling him to "wake up", declaring: "We're going to build thousands of council family sized homes on golf courses. We're fighting for a fairer Enfield." Georgiou retaliated directly, responding: "OK darling calm down. You can cry about it when I take your job next May, save the Green Belt and save Enfield from 15 years of Labour destruction... your career is finished and you know it." Erbil concluded the exchange by asking Georgiou: "Would you like to join me when I put the first spade in the ground on your golf course? I'll save you a front-row seat. You can sip your G&T while I turn your 18th hole into someone's living room."

In early 2026, the village of Crews Hill in Enfield was designated as one of seven nationwide locations for a new town development, backed by Erbil's Labour administration, the Mayor of London, and central government. Green Belt development was a major campaign issue leading up to the 2026 election, where Georgiou ultimately succeeded Erbil as council leader.

=== Member of the London Assembly (2024-present) ===
In the 2024 London Assembly election, Georgiou was elected to City Hall as a London-wide Member of the London Assembly (AM) under the City Hall Conservatives group. As an Assembly Member, his responsibilities have included sitting on the Budget and Performance Committee, the Economy, Culture and Skills Committee, and the GLA Oversight Committee.

Georgiou's tenure on the London Assembly has been defined by highly confrontational and televised exchanges with Labour Mayor of London Sadiq Khan. He regularly utilises video clips from the London Assembly to drive engagement across social media platforms in an effort to amplify his campaigns against Low Traffic Neighbourhoods (LTNs), over-development in outer London, and the expansion of the Ultra Low Emission Zone (ULEZ).

=== Leader of Enfield Council (2026-present) ===
Following the local elections held on 7 May 2026, Enfield Council was left in a state of no overall control. The Enfield Conservatives returned 31 councillors, falling one seat short of an absolute majority, while Labour won 27 seats and the Green Party won 5 seats.

On 27 May 2026, Georgiou was officially elected Leader of Enfield London Borough Council after forming a minority Conservative administration. His appointment ended 16 years of Labour control in the borough, and was achieved after the Green Party group chose to abstain from the leadership vote.

==== Opposition to a new town at Crews Hill ====
On 28 May 2026, in his first decisive act as leader, Georgiou issued a formal letter to Housing Minister Matthew Pennycook, officially withdrawing Enfield Council from the Labour Government's New Town programme. The government scheme, initialised in March 2026, had designated land around Crews Hill and Chase Park as one of seven nationwide locations earmarked for a New Town development capable of yielding up to 21,000 homes. Georgiou stated: "We have been elected on a clear mandate to protect Enfield's Green Belt, and today we are honouring that commitment by formally withdrawing from the New Town process." In his letter, Georgiou stated that "77% of the Enfield electorate voted for parties whose 2026 manifestos explicitly committed to opposing the proposed New Town" and that "this decision directly reflects the democratic will of the residents we have been chosen to represent".

==== Whitewebbs Park ====
On 29 May 2026, Georgiou refused to sign a pending lease agreement that would have handed control of a portion of Whitewebbs Park to Tottenham Hotspur F.C. for a Women's Training Academy.

== Personal life ==
Georgiou was born at Chase Farm Hospital in Gordon Hill, Enfield. He is of Greek descent on his father's side, and Italian descent on his mother's side.

He and his family lived in a one-bedroom flat in Edmonton, before later relocating to Arnos Grove.

He attended Garfield Primary School and Broomfield School in Arnos Grove. He studied International Relations at the University of Essex, and was first elected as an Enfield councillor in 2014 whilst in the third year of his degree, at the age of 21.

Georgiou lives in Cockfosters with his wife and children.
