= Whitewebbs =

Electoral ward in London, England

- Electoral ward for the Enfield London Borough Council
- Whitewebbs ward boundaries since 2022
- Borough: Enfield
- County: Greater London
- Population: 13,843 (2021) (Note: 2021 Census data reported for 2022 ward boundaries)
- Electorate: 9,875 (2022)
- Major settlements: Bulls Cross, Clay Hill, Crews Hill
- Area: 4.754 km^{2} (1.836 sq mi)

Current electoral ward
- Created: 2022
- Number of members: 3
- Councillors: Reece Fox; Maxwell Day; Eralda Qirjo
- Created from: Chase, Town
- GSS code: E05013695

Whitewebbs is an electoral ward in the London Borough of Enfield. The ward was first used in the 2022 elections and elects three councillors to Enfield London Borough Council.

== List of councillors ==
Seat	Councillor	Took office	Left office	Party	Election
1	Hannah Dyson	2022	2026	Conservative	2022
2	David Skelton	2022	2026	Conservative	2022
3	Reece Fox	2022	Incumbent	Conservative	2022, 2026
1	Maxwell Day	2026	Incumbent	Conservative	2026
2	Eralda Qirjo	2026	Incumbent	Conservative	2026

== Summary ==
Councillors elected by party at each general borough election.

== Elections ==
=== 2026 election ===
The election took place on 7 May 2026.

2026 Enfield London Borough Council election: Whitewebbs (3)
Party	Candidate	Votes	%	±%
Conservative	Reece Fox	2,565		
Conservative	Maxwell Day	2,540		
Conservative	Eralda Qirjo	2,320		
Green	Terry O'Dwyer	1,165		
Green	Andrea Sibers	1,160		
Green	Will Tadros	1,071		
Labour	Judy Ellerby	805		
Labour	Andrew Hartley	744		
Labour	Mustafa Kirac	686		
Reform	Stephen Bird	649		
Reform	Deborah Cairns	569		
Reform	Stephen Payne	505		
Liberal Democrats	Tim Martin	279		
Liberal Democrats	Thomas Hawkins	263		
Liberal Democrats	Edmund Pringle	227		
Turnout			29.3	−16.3
Conservative hold		Swing		
Conservative hold		Swing		
Conservative hold		Swing		

=== 2022 election ===
The election took place on 5 May 2022.

2022 Enfield London Borough Council election: Whitewebbs (3)
Party	Candidate	Votes	%	±%
Conservative	Hannah Dyson	1,900	44.1	
Conservative	David Skelton	1,788	41.5	
Conservative	Reece Fox	1,712	39.7	
Labour	David Wood	1,313	30.4	
Labour	Nishan Dzhingozyan	1,256	29.1	
Labour	Hass Yusuf	1,186	27.5	
Liberal Democrats	Gaetano Russo	1,057	24.5	
Liberal Democrats	Robert Wilson	1,042	24.2	
Liberal Democrats	Ayfer Orhan	971	22.5	
Green	Stephen Hennessy	558	12.9	
Reform	Deborah Cairns	85	2.0	
TUSC	Mirjana Glavardanov	70	1.6	
Turnout			45.6	
Conservative win (new seat)				
Conservative win (new seat)				
Conservative win (new seat)				
