= Brimsdown (ward) =

Electoral ward in London, England

- Electoral ward for the Enfield London Borough Council
- Borough: Enfield
- County: Greater London
- Population: 16,250 (2021)
- Major settlements: Brimsdown
- Area: 4.677 km²

Current electoral ward
- Created: 2022
- Councillors: 3

Brimsdown is an electoral ward in the London Borough of Enfield. The ward was first used in the 2022 elections and elects three councillors to Enfield London Borough Council.

== Geography ==
The ward is named after the suburb of Brimsdown.

== Councillors ==
| Election | Councillors | | |
|---|---|---|---|
| 2022 | Hivran Dalkaya (Labour) | Bektas Ozer (Labour) | Ahmet Hasan (Labour) |

== Elections ==
=== 2026 ===
Brimsdown (3)
| Party | Candidate | Votes | % | ±% |
|---|---|---|---|---|
| Liberal Democrats | Gungor Buldu | | | |
| Reform | Antonio Campaniello | | | |
| Labour | Hivran Dalkaya | | | |
| Labour | Ahmet Hasan | | | |
| Conservative | Simon Heathwood | | | |
| Conservative | Ertan Hurer | | | |
| Conservative | Hasan Hurer | | | |
| Liberal Democrats | Teslime Karaoglan | | | |
| Liberal Democrats | Syed Kazmi | | | |
| Green | Andreea Malin | | | |
| Labour | Bektas Ozer | | | |
| Reform | Ismail Polat | | | |
| Reform | Ozlem Polat | | | |
| TUSC | Sarah Sachs-Eldridge | | | |
| Turnout | | | | |

=== 2022 ===
Brimsdown (3)
| Party | Candidate | Votes | % | ±% |
|---|---|---|---|---|
| Labour | Hivran Dalkaya | 1,988 | 63.3 | |
| Labour | Bektas Ozer | 1,883 | 60.0 | |
| Labour | Ahmet Hasan | 1,879 | 59.9 | |
| Conservative | Michael Lavender | 877 | 27.9 | |
| Conservative | Leval Ainah | 856 | 27.3 | |
| Conservative | Stephen Savva | 823 | 26.2 | |
| Green | Mary Anderson | 395 | 12.6 | |
| Liberal Democrats | Robin Dubow | 236 | 7.5 | |
| Liberal Democrats | Mark Riley | 206 | 6.6 | |
| Liberal Democrats | Tony Kidman | 198 | 6.3 | |
| TUSC | Josh Asker | 77 | 2.5 | |
| Turnout | | | 32.0 | |
| Labour win (new seat) | | | | |
| Labour win (new seat) | | | | |
| Labour win (new seat) | | | | |
