= Grange Park (ward) =

Electoral ward in London, England

- Electoral ward for the Enfield London Borough Council
- Borough: Enfield
- County: Greater London
- Population: 9,362 (2021)
- Major settlements: Grange Park
- Area: 2.601 km²

Current electoral ward
- Created: 2022
- Councillors: 2

Grange Park is an electoral ward in the London Borough of Enfield. The ward was first used in the 2022 elections and elects two councillors to Enfield London Borough Council.

== Geography ==
The ward is named after the suburb of Grange Park.

== Councillors ==
Election	Councillors	
2022	Chris Dey (Conservative)	Andy Milne (Conservative)

== Elections ==
=== 2026 ===
Grange Park (2)
Party	Candidate	Votes	%	±%
Reform	Stephen Berndes			
Conservative	Chris Dey			
Green	David Flint			
Liberal Democrats	Stuart Laycock			
Reform	Tracey Lewis			
Conservative	Andy Milne			
Labour	Ben Rogers			
Labour	Elizabeth Smith			
Green	Olivia Thurley			
Enfield Community Independents	Fadime Tonbul			
Liberal Democrats	Claire Wilson			
Turnout				

=== 2022 ===
Grange Park (2)
Party	Candidate	Votes	%	±%
Conservative	Chris Dey	1,724	58.6	
Conservative	Andy Milne	1,672	56.9	
Labour	Hazel Kinsler	784	26.7	
Labour	Chris James	669	22.8	
Liberal Democrats	Claire Wilson	375	12.8	
Green	Luke Balnave	361	12.3	
Liberal Democrats	Stuart Laycock	294	10.0	
Turnout			47.0	
Conservative win (new seat)				
Conservative win (new seat)				
