= Lower Edmonton =

Lower Edmonton may refer to:

- Lower Edmonton (low level) railway station
- Lower Edmonton (ward)

== See also ==
- Lower Edmondson Village, Baltimore
