= Bush Hill Park (ward) =

Electoral ward in London, England

- Electoral ward for the Enfield London Borough Council
- Borough: Enfield
- County: Greater London
- Population: 12,708 (2021)
- Major settlements: Bush Hill Park
- Area: 2.347 km²

Current electoral ward
- Created: 2002
- Councillors: 3

Bush Hill Park is an electoral ward in the London Borough of Enfield. The ward was first used in the 2002 elections and elects three councillors to Enfield London Borough Council.

== Geography ==
The ward is named after the suburb of Bush Hill Park.

== Councillors ==
Election	Councillors		
2022	Peter Fallart (Conservative)	Patricia Gregory (Conservative)	James Hockney (Conservative)

== Elections ==
=== 2026 ===
Bush Hill Park (3)
Party	Candidate	Votes	%	±%
Conservative	Pat Gregory	2,288		
Conservative	James Hockney	2,283		
Conservative	Peter David Fallart	2,244		
Green	Luke Ashley Balnave	984		
Labour	Kasha-Marie Ababio	920		
Green	Mike McGowan	867		
Labour	George Lewis	852		
Labour	Angie McEvoy	836		
Reform	Rebecca Cruickshank	600		
Reform	Jessica Gold	561		
Reform	Mary Ann McKenna	538		
Liberal Democrats	John Henry Martin	360		
Liberal Democrats	Helmi van Leur	281		
Liberal Democrats	Norman Whitby	267		
TUSC	Paula Jane Mitchell	116		
Turnout			36.6	−5.7
Conservative hold		Swing		
Conservative hold		Swing		
Conservative hold		Swing		

=== 2022 ===
Bush Hill Park (3)
Party	Candidate	Votes	%	±%
Conservative	James Hockney	2,097	53.8	
Conservative	Peter Fallart	2,071	53.1	
Conservative	Pat Gregory	2,049	52.6	
Labour	Bevin Betton	1,265	32.5	
Labour	Folashade Adeleke	1,220	31.3	
Labour	Huseyin Akpinar	1,130	29.0	
Green	Benjamin Maydon	536	13.8	
Liberal Democrats	Alexander Bassey	443	11.4	
Liberal Democrats	John Martin	419	10.8	
Liberal Democrats	Ade Adetula	392	10.1	
Reform	David Schofield	71	1.8	
Turnout			42.3	
Conservative hold		Swing		
Conservative hold		Swing		
Conservative hold		Swing		
