= Carterhatch (ward) =

Electoral ward in London, England

- Electoral ward for the Enfield London Borough Council
- Borough: Enfield
- County: Greater London
- Population: 12,367 (2021)
- Major settlements: Carterhatch
- Area: 1.722 km²

Current electoral ward
- Created: 2022
- Councillors: 2

Carterhatch is an electoral ward in the London Borough of Enfield. The ward was first used in the 2022 elections and elects two councillors to Enfield London Borough Council.

== Geography ==
The ward is named after the suburb of Carterhatch.

== Councillors ==
Election	Councillors	
2026	Ayten Guzel (Labour)	Nawshad Ali (Labour)
2022	Susan Erbil (Labour)	Nawshad Ali (Labour)

== Elections ==
=== 2026 ===
Carterhatch (2)
Party	Candidate	Votes	%	±%
Labour	Ayten Guzel	836		
Labour	Nawshad Ali	792		
Green	Robert Stephen Page	697		
Conservative	Erol Huseyin	622		
Conservative	Carmela Fetta	619		
Reform	Wang June	429		
Reform	David Alfred Kruyer	415		
Liberal Democrats	Anne Viney	185		
TUSC	John Dolan	100		
Liberal Democrats	Stephen Viney	93		
Turnout			35.7	+5.0
Labour hold		Swing		
Labour hold		Swing		

=== 2022 ===
Carterhatch (2)
Party	Candidate	Votes	%	±%
Labour	Susan Erbil	1,388	66.1	
Labour	Nawshad Ali	1,325	63.1	
Conservative	Foston Fairclough	532	25.3	
Conservative	Salem Al-Damluji	472	22.5	
Green	Robert Page	218	10.4	
Liberal Democrats	Mary Keh	132	6.3	
Liberal Democrats	Victoria Keh	131	6.2	
Turnout			30.7	
Labour win (new seat)				
Labour win (new seat)				
