= 2026 Enfield London Borough Council election =

2026 English local government election

- 7 May 2026

All 63 seats to Enfield London Borough Council 32 seats needed for a majority
- Turnout: 42.3%
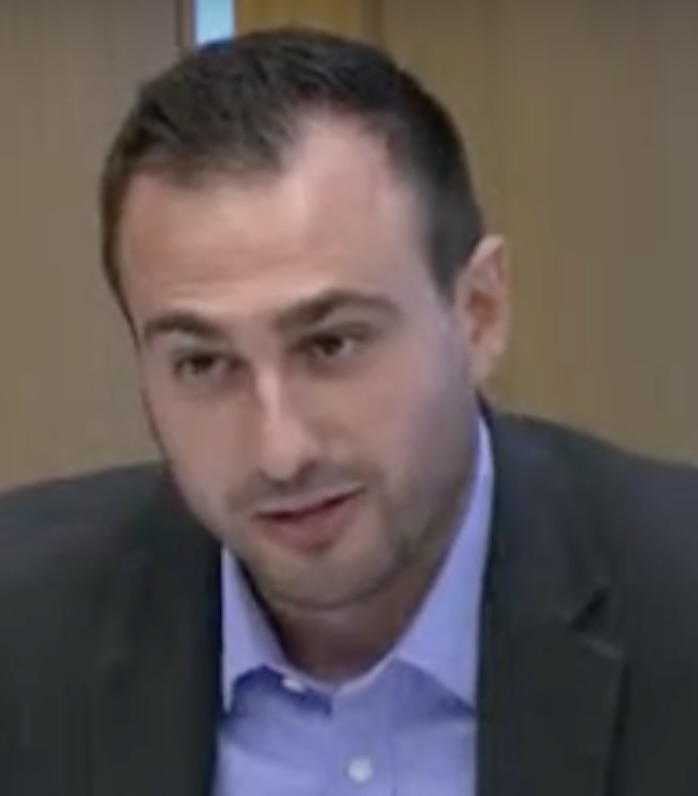
	First party	Second party	Third party
Leader	Alessandro Georgiou	Ergin Erbil	Sarah Jons
Party	Conservative	Labour	Green
Leader's seat	Cockfosters	Edmonton Green	Enfield Lock
Last election	25 seats, 36.8%	38 seats, 45.5%	0 seats, 6.6%
Seats before	25	35	0
Seats after	31	27	5
Seat change	▲6	▼11	▲5
Popular vote	80,168	55,261	44,290
Percentage	35.4%	24.4%	19.5%
Swing	▼1.4pp	▼21.1pp	▲12.9pp
- Map of the results of the 2026 Enfield London Borough Council election. Conservatives in blue, Labour in red and Green in green. Striped wards have mixed representation.
Leader before election
Ergin Erbil
Labour
Leader after election
Alessandro Georgiou
Conservative
No overall control

The 2026 Enfield London Borough Council election took place on 7 May 2026, as part of the 2026 United Kingdom local elections. All 63 members of Enfield London Borough Council were elected. The election was held alongside local elections in the other London boroughs.

Prior to the election, the council had been under Labour majority control for 16 years. This election saw the council go under no overall control. The Conservatives won the largest number of seats, but fell one seat short of an overall majority. At the subsequent annual council meeting on 27 May 2026, both the incumbent Labour leader, Ergin Erbil, and the Conservative group leader, Alessandro Georgiou, were proposed for the role of leader of the council. Georgiou was appointed after the Green Party abstained. He therefore leads a Conservative minority administration.

== Background ==
=== History ===
Result of the 2022 election

The thirty-two London boroughs were established in 1965 by the London Government Act 1963. They are the principal authorities in Greater London and have responsibilities including education, housing, planning, highways, social services, libraries, recreation, waste, environmental health and revenue collection. Some of the powers are shared with the Greater London Authority, which also manages passenger transport, police and fire.

Since its formation, Enfield has been under Labour or Conservative control. Most councillors elected to the council have been Labour or Conservative. The council has had an overall Labour majority since the 2010 election. In the most recent prior election in 2022, Labour won 38 seats with 45.9% of the vote to the Conservatives' 25 with 36.8% of the vote. The Liberal Democrats won 9.7% of the vote and the Greens won 6.6%, but neither won any seats.

=== Council term ===
From 2018 to 2024, the council was led by Labour's Nesil Caliskan, who resigned as council leader following her election as the MP for Barking in the 2024 United Kingdom general election. On 18 September 2024, Ergin Erbil was formally appointed as the new council leader.

== Electoral process ==
Enfield, as is the case all other London borough councils, elects all of its councillors at once every four years, with the previous election having taken place in 2022. The election takes place by multi-member first-past-the-post voting, with each ward being represented by two or three councillors. Electors had as many votes as there are councillors to be elected in their ward, with the top two or three being elected.

All registered electors (British, Irish, Commonwealth and European Union citizens) living in London aged 18 or over were entitled to vote in the election. People who lived at two addresses in different councils, such as university students with different term-time and holiday addresses, were entitled to be registered for and vote in elections in both local authorities. Voting in-person at polling stations took place from 7:00 to 22:00 on election day, and voters were able to apply for postal votes or proxy votes in advance of the election.

== Previous council composition ==
After 2022 election		Before 2026 election		After 2026 election	
Party	Seats	Party	Seats	Party	Seats
Labour	38	Labour	35	Conservative	31
Conservative	25	Conservative	25	Labour	27
		Independent	3	Green	5

Changes 2022–2026:

- March 2023: Esin Gunes (Labour) resigns – by-election held April 2023
- April 2023: Destiny Karakus (Labour) wins by-election
- June 2024: Thomas Fawns (Labour) suspended from party
- October 2024: Nesil Caliskan (Labour) resigns – by-election held November 2024
- November 2024: Ian Barnes (Labour) wins by-election
- June 2025: Mohammad Islam (Labour) suspended from party
- September 2025: Mustafa Cetinkaya (Labour) leaves party to sit as an independent

== Election results ==
Council composition after the 2022 election

Council composition after the 2026 election

2026 Enfield London Borough Council election
Party	Candidates	Seats	Gains	Losses	Net gain/loss	Seats %	Votes %	Votes	+/−
Conservative	63	31	6	-	▲6	49.20	35.36	80,168	▼1.44
Labour	63	27	-	11	▼11	42.86	24.37	55,261	▼21.13
Green	50	5	5	-	▲5	7.94	19.53	44,290	▲12.93
Reform	63	0	-	-	Steady	-	11.54	26,156	▲11.44
Liberal Democrats	63	0	-	-	Steady	-	6.12	13,885	▼3.58
Enfield Community Independents Your Voice	17	0	-	-	Steady	-	2.53	5,736	NEW
TUSC	10	0	-	-	Steady	-	0.25	595	▲0.05
Independent	3	0	-	-	Steady	-	0.23	511	▼0.77
CPA	1	0	-	-	Steady	-	0.04	101	NEW
Communist League Election Campaign	1	0	-	-	Steady	-	0.02	41	NEW

== Ward results ==
Candidates listed in the statement of persons nominated:

=== Arnos Grove (2) ===
Arnos Grove (2)
Party	Candidate	Votes	%	±%
Conservative	Paul Pratt	1,332		
Conservative	Shyamala Lennon	1,253		
Green	John Philip Shields	637		
Labour	Shamshia Ali	618		
Green	Jon Wright	589		
Labour	Andrew Gilbert	587		
Reform	Donald Farquharson Berry	272		
Liberal Democrats	Joan Bushill	248		
Liberal Democrats	Chris Bushill	243		
Reform	Eugene Secchi	224		
Turnout			49.1	+2.1
Conservative hold		Swing		
Conservative hold		Swing		

=== Bowes (2) ===
Bowes (2)
Party	Candidate	Votes	%	±%
Labour	Alex Diner	825		
Conservative	Dino Lemonides	757		
Conservative	Ediz Mevlit	740		
Green	Helen Linda Karamallakis	733		
Labour	Kakoly Pande	696		
Green	Dan Stachow	592		
Reform	Mark Brobyn	217		
Liberal Democrats	Steve Stavrinou	137		
Reform	Heidi Voorbraeck	136		
Liberal Democrats	Steven Adderley	132		
TUSC	Karl Vidol	38		
Turnout			37.8	+4.8
Labour hold		Swing		
Conservative gain from Labour		Swing		

=== Brimsdown (3) ===
Brimsdown (3)
Party	Candidate	Votes	%	±%
Labour	Hivran Dalkaya	1,254		
Labour	Ahmet Hasan	1,239		
Labour	Bektas Ozer	1,120		
Conservative	Simon Heathwood	1,048		
Green	Andreea Malin	987		
Conservative	Ertan Hurer	780		
Conservative	Hasan Hurer	777		
Reform	Antonio Campaniello	632		
Reform	Ismail Polat	502		
Reform	Ozlem Polat	466		
Liberal Democrats	Gungor Buldu	259		
Liberal Democrats	Teslime Karaoglan	247		
Liberal Democrats	Syed Kazmi	219		
TUSC	Sarah Sachs-Eldridge	121		
Turnout			25.0	−7.0
Labour hold		Swing		
Labour hold		Swing		
Labour hold		Swing		

=== Bullsmoor (2) ===
Bullsmoor (2)
Party	Candidate	Votes	%	±%
Labour	Destiny Karakus	971		
Labour	Faye Nimoh	871		
Conservative	Margaret Brady	735		
Conservative	Millie Chinwe Okeke	688		
Green	Tessa Frances Stewart	656		
Green	Jocelyn Helen Whittakersmith	524		
Reform	Richard James Ashford Davey	491		
Reform	John Lacey-Smith	462		
Liberal Democrats	Anthony Damianou	155		
Liberal Democrats	Adonï Mungombe	94		
TUSC	Bea Gardner Asker	31		
Turnout			39.7	+8.1
Labour hold		Swing		
Labour hold		Swing		

=== Bush Hill Park (3) ===
Bush Hill Park (3)
Party	Candidate	Votes	%	±%
Conservative	Pat Gregory	2,288		
Conservative	James Hockney	2,283		
Conservative	Peter David Fallart	2,244		
Green	Luke Ashley Balnave	984		
Labour	Kasha-Marie Ababio	920		
Green	Mike McGowan	867		
Labour	George Lewis	852		
Labour	Angie McEvoy	836		
Reform	Rebecca Cruickshank	600		
Reform	Jessica Gold	561		
Reform	Mary Ann McKenna	538		
Liberal Democrats	John Henry Martin	360		
Liberal Democrats	Helmi van Leur	281		
Liberal Democrats	Norman Whitby	267		
TUSC	Paula Jane Mitchell	116		
Turnout			36.6	−5.7
Conservative hold		Swing		
Conservative hold		Swing		
Conservative hold		Swing		

=== Carterhatch (2) ===
Carterhatch (2)
Party	Candidate	Votes	%	±%
Labour	Ayten Guzel	836		
Labour	Nawshad Ali	792		
Green	Robert Stephen Page	697		
Conservative	Erol Huseyin	622		
Conservative	Carmela Fetta	619		
Reform	Wang June	429		
Reform	David Alfred Kruyer	415		
Liberal Democrats	Anne Viney	185		
TUSC	John Dolan	100		
Liberal Democrats	Stephen Viney	93		
Turnout			35.7	+5.0
Labour hold		Swing		
Labour hold		Swing		

=== Cockfosters (2) ===
Cockfosters (2)
Party	Candidate	Votes	%	±%
Conservative	Alessandro Georgiou	2,047		
Conservative	Alara Ayyildiz	1,858		
Green	Caley Elizabeth Powellmitchell-Dolby	580		
Labour	Arzu Aydemir	466		
Reform	Samuel Norris	465		
Reform	Felicity Aoibhinn Brown	456		
Labour	Paul Shaverin	422		
Liberal Democrats	Brian Cronk	237		
Liberal Democrats	Mutlu Beyzade	217		
Turnout			47.1	+8.7
Conservative hold		Swing		
Conservative hold		Swing		

=== Edmonton Green (3) ===
Edmonton Green (3)
Party	Candidate	Votes	%	±%
Labour	Ergin Erbil	1,381		
Labour	Abdul Abdullahi	1,309		
Labour	Gunes Akbulut	1,285		
Green	Claudia Mayuba	813		
Green	Shakira Ortiz	708		
Green	Tathy Yoka Mpela	637		
Conservative	Clayton Barnes	516		
Conservative	Paul McCannah	421		
Conservative	Rahman Hifjur	365		
Reform	Richard Stephen Loughlin	322		
Enfield Community Independents Your Voice	Sevda Kaygili	318		
Enfield Community Independents Your Voice	Ersoy Halil	284		
Reform	Ruzhka Ivanova	278		
Reform	Gokan Mustafa Salim	243		
Enfield Community Independents Your Voice	Katreece Efua Thelma Roberts	241		
Liberal Democrats	Julia Davenport	170		
Liberal Democrats	Stefan Kasprzyk	109		
Liberal Democrats	Milesh Shah	87		
Turnout			33.6	+3.1
Labour hold		Swing		
Labour hold		Swing		
Labour hold		Swing		

=== Enfield Lock (3) ===
Enfield Lock (3)
Party	Candidate	Votes	%	±%
Green	Sarah Jons	1,128		
Labour	Suna Hurman	1,117		
Green	Ratip Alsulaiman	1,100		
Labour	Sabri Ozaydin	1,063		
Green	Bernie Rees	1,010		
Labour	Eylem Yuruk	974		
Conservative	John Joseph Bennet	802		
Conservative	Tim Cela	727		
Conservative	Austin Spreadbury	665		
Reform	Paul Stephen Conway	648		
Reform	Gary Alan Robbens	588		
Reform	Blueu Eves	575		
Liberal Democrats	Margaret Steel	182		
Liberal Democrats	Chris Le'Candharwood	169		
Liberal Democrats	Michael Steel	123		
CPA	Neville Kenneth Watson	101		
TUSC	Josh Asker	47		
Turnout			34.6	+3.9
Green gain from Labour		Swing		
Labour hold		Swing		
Green gain from Labour		Swing		

=== Grange Park (2) ===
Grange Park (2)
Party	Candidate	Votes	%	±%
Conservative	Chris Dey	1,956		
Conservative	Andy Milne	1,844		
Green	Olivia Ann Thurley	529		
Green	David Christopher Flint	513		
Labour	Elizabeth Smith	495		
Labour	Ben Rogers	456		
Reform	Stephen Berndes	454		
Reform	Tracey Lewis	371		
Liberal Democrats	Claire Wilson	208		
Liberal Democrats	Stuart Laycock	186		
Enfield Community Independents Your Voice	Fadime Tonbul	47		
Turnout			55.6	+8.6
Conservative hold		Swing		
Conservative hold		Swing		

=== Haselbury (3) ===
Haselbury (3)
Party	Candidate	Votes	%	±%
Labour	Ibrahim Cam	1,119		
Labour	Mahym Bedekova	1,038		
Labour	George Savva	1,022		
Green	Douglas Christopher Peter Knight	959		
Conservative	Christine Bellas	876		
Conservative	Frank Greene	842		
Conservative	Clare Naomi Louise Grierson	784		
Enfield Community Independents Your Voice	Oktay Cinpolat	539		
Reform	Peter Dominic Holder	455		
Reform	Peter Brian Rust	420		
Independent	Mustafa Cetinkaya	405		
Reform	Bassey Williams	396		
Enfield Community Independents Your Voice	Akis Hajittofi	371		
Enfield Community Independents Your Voice	Daniel Zsombor	332		
Liberal Democrats	Lenuta Abdullah	283		
Liberal Democrats	Brendan Malone	237		
Liberal Democrats	Richard Morgan-Ash	201		
Communist League Election Campaign	Dag Irving Tirsen	41		
Turnout			34.3	+4.3
Labour hold		Swing		
Labour hold		Swing		
Labour hold		Swing		

=== Highfield (2) ===
Highfield (2)
Party	Candidate	Votes	%	±%
Conservative	Bambos Charalambous	1,112		
Conservative	Peter Charalambous	1,077		
Green	Ferhan Sterk	620		
Green	Eunice Szekir	564		
Labour	Nicki Adeleke	563		
Labour	Gizem Tiskaya	489		
Reform	Stuart John Sime	274		
Reform	James Andrew Theochari	237		
Enfield Community Independents Your Voice	Hasan Ali	127		
Liberal Democrats	Duarte Goncalves Dias da Silva	126		
Enfield Community Independents Your Voice	Nuran Ali	125		
Liberal Democrats	Darya Paun	115		
Turnout			41.7	+6.2
Conservative gain from Labour		Swing		
Conservative gain from Labour		Swing		

=== Jubilee (3) ===
Jubilee (3)
Party	Candidate	Votes	%	±%
Labour	Ian Barnes	1,265		
Labour	Alev Cazimoglu	1,218		
Labour	Susan Erbil	1,157		
Conservative	Lansana Conteh	977		
Conservative	Josh Guillen-Caamano	908		
Green	Kay Natalie Heather	888		
Conservative	Leonard Munasinghe	854		
Reform	Sophie Kingsbury	441		
Reform	Murat Alma	433		
Reform	Candace Cruickshank	407		
Liberal Democrats	Tulay Bacak	282		
Enfield Community Independents Your Voice	Kevin Cordes	265		
Liberal Democrats	Ayse Ekici	254		
Enfield Community Independents Your Voice	Shehzad Jummun	251		
Liberal Democrats	Derya Ekici	203		
Turnout			35.4	+3.1
Labour hold		Swing		
Labour hold		Swing		
Labour hold		Swing		

=== Lower Edmonton (3) ===
Lower Edmonton (3)
Party	Candidate	Votes	%	±%
Labour	Sinan Boztas	1,306		
Labour	Siddo Dwyer	1,254		
Labour	Elif Erbil	1,233		
Green	Georgina Bavetta	957		
Conservative	Thomas Alan Bellas	701		
Conservative	Patrick Hewitt Drysdale	640		
Conservative	Louise Sandra Anne Rodway	578		
Enfield Community Independents Your Voice	Sharron Hope	440		
Reform	Paula Gaye Philippou	328		
Reform	Suleyman Polat	321		
Enfield Community Independents Your Voice	Sarah Onifade	316		
Reform	Mariya Kochankova	298		
Liberal Democrats	Sevda Bulduk	272		
Liberal Democrats	Sudha Matta	168		
Liberal Democrats	Aidan Neligan	134		
Turnout			32.7	+4.2
Labour hold		Swing		
Labour hold		Swing		
Labour hold		Swing		

=== New Southgate (2) ===
New Southgate (2)
Party	Candidate	Votes	%	±%
Green	Laura Davenport	1,205		
Green	Madeline Church	1,146		
Labour	Nelly Gyosheva	1,017		
Labour	Hass Yusuf	862		
Conservative	Andrew Beale	552		
Conservative	John Ennis	477		
Reform	James Michael Doolan	304		
Reform	Shelley Jane Doolan	274		
Liberal Democrats	Diana Medlicott	223		
Liberal Democrats	George Kourtellaris	209		
Independent	Nadeen Stockhouse	45		
TUSC	Joselene Peres	26		
Turnout			42.7	+2.0
Green gain from Labour		Swing		
Green gain from Labour		Swing		

=== Oakwood (2) ===
Oakwood (2)
Party	Candidate	Votes	%	±%
Conservative	James Bone	1,607		
Conservative	Thomas M O'Halloran	1,511		
Green	Basil Thomas Clarke	619		
Green	Nabila Porte	590		
Labour	Adam Kayani	370		
Reform	John Gristwood	345		
Labour	Linda Shaverin Hirsh	334		
Reform	Michael Akubueze	316		
Liberal Democrats	Adamantios Harrison	186		
Liberal Democrats	David Peters	148		
Turnout			49.7	+8.1
Conservative hold		Swing		
Conservative hold		Swing		

=== Palmers Green (2) ===
Palmers Green (2)
Party	Candidate	Votes	%	±%
Labour	Chris James	1,120		
Labour	Doug Taylor	1,024		
Green	Ben Bleet	963		
Conservative	Angela Evangelou	904		
Green	Brendan Alexander Geraghty Lee	850		
Conservative	Jonny Ross	801		
Reform	Nigel Gibbs	232		
Reform	John Sime	213		
Liberal Democrats	Tony Kidman	200		
Liberal Democrats	Richard Mapleston	168		
TUSC	Oscar Parry	13		
Turnout			46.4	+3.3
Labour hold		Swing		
Labour hold		Swing		

=== Ponders End (2) ===
Ponders End (2)
Party	Candidate	Votes	%	±%
Green	Aziz Yildiz	913		
Labour	Niamh O'Brien	881		
Labour	Talal Ahmed Rajab	822		
Conservative	Rachel Ann Shawcross	438		
Conservative	Ceng Yavuz	435		
Liberal Democrats	Rob Brassett	238		
Reform	Rickey Everton Powell	236		
Enfield Community Independents Your Voice	Hakan Kaygili	207		
Reform	Kirk Young	186		
Liberal Democrats	James Rooke	158		
TUSC	Ian David Campbell Pattison	46		
Turnout			32.3	+0.7
Green gain from Labour		Swing		
Labour hold		Swing		

=== Ridgeway (3) ===
Ridgeway (3)
Party	Candidate	Votes	%	±%
Conservative	Joanne Louise Laban	2,831		
Conservative	Andrew James Thorp	2,719		
Conservative	Edward Michael Ian Smith	2,679		
Green	Emily Charis Rainbow	962		
Green	Martin Andrew Reed	865		
Green	Conor James Sullivan	769		
Labour	Beren Dursun	617		
Reform	Russell Berndes	613		
Labour	Ian Hamilton	607		
Labour	Christopher James	602		
Reform	James Alexander Stanton	581		
Reform	Emileo Kaan Fernandez	550		
Liberal Democrats	Daniel Lansbury	280		
Liberal Democrats	David Andrew Turner	254		
Liberal Democrats	Surraiya Zia	249		
Turnout			54.3	+8.3
Conservative hold		Swing		
Conservative hold		Swing		
Conservative hold		Swing		

=== Southbury (3) ===
Southbury (3)
Party	Candidate	Votes	%	±%
Conservative	Penny Heathwood	1,545		
Conservative	Betty Achayo	1,530		
Conservative	Benny Neza	1,422		
Green	Mueez Abdurrahman	1,076		
Labour	Rick Jewell	1,070		
Labour	Hanim Akdemir	1,056		
Green	Antonio Favata	1,050		
Green	Steve Rawlinson	1,041		
Labour	Mahmut Aksanoglu	1,019		
Reform	Robert Edward Landragin	519		
Reform	Andrew Dale Law	519		
Reform	Milcho Danailov	491		
Liberal Democrats	Nick Bromley	258		
Liberal Democrats	Stephen William Driver	206		
Liberal Democrats	Syed A Saboor	134		
TUSC	Paul John Kershaw	57		
Turnout			43.9	+8.9
Conservative gain from Labour		Swing		
Conservative gain from Labour		Swing		
Conservative gain from Labour		Swing		

=== Southgate (3) ===
Southgate (3)
Party	Candidate	Votes	%	±%
Conservative	Stephanos Ioannou	2,209		
Conservative	Chris Joannides	2,025		
Conservative	Elisa Morreale	1,961		
Green	Katie Knight	1,447		
Green	Charith Abeysinghe Gunawardena	1,384		
Green	Meraaj Sadath	1,220		
Labour	Carl Bayliss	775		
Labour	Ardil Akgul	758		
Labour	Gary Ogin	656		
Reform	Cameron Corrigan	480		
Reform	Deborah Palmer	461		
Reform	Elliot Stein	408		
Liberal Democrats	Alan Stainer	235		
Liberal Democrats	Paul Hsu	228		
Liberal Democrats	Lorice Stainer	210		
Turnout			46.9	+2.4
Conservative hold		Swing		
Conservative hold		Swing		
Conservative hold		Swing		

=== Town (3) ===
Town (3)
Party	Candidate	Votes	%	±%
Conservative	Michael Jeremy Rye	2,040		
Conservative	Emma Supple	1,981		
Conservative	Kiran Mistry	1,878		
Green	Lesley Elizabeth Hill	1,247		
Green	Josh Emerson	1,218		
Green	Dave Sandham	1,118		
Labour	Jacob Persaud	769		
Labour	Alanna Rahimi	754		
Labour	Graham Taylor	734		
Reform	Scott Cummines	611		
Reform	Jeff Evans	595		
Reform	Paul Hennin	579		
Liberal Democrats	Rob Aaron-Wilson	504		
Liberal Democrats	Lauren Fulbright	501		
Liberal Democrats	Paul Meehan	439		
Turnout			52.5	+8.1
Conservative hold		Swing		
Conservative hold		Swing		
Conservative hold		Swing		

=== Upper Edmonton (3) ===
Upper Edmonton (3)
Party	Candidate	Votes	%	±%
Labour	Margaret Greer	1,086		
Labour	Tim Leaver	946		
Labour	Chris McCoy	872		
Green	Natasha Malaika Brown	833		
Enfield Community Independents Your Voice	Meryem Kuscu	667		
Enfield Community Independents Your Voice	Khalid Mohammad Sadur	649		
Green	Sophie Peterken	635		
Enfield Community Independents Your Voice	Toby Daniel Osmond	557		
Conservative	Lindsay Rawlings	391		
Conservative	Andrena Smith	366		
Reform	John David Jackson	311		
Conservative	Glynis Vince	309		
Reform	Stephen Victor Howell	291		
Reform	Bambo Efstathiou	282		
Liberal Democrats	Özge Bilecen	241		
Liberal Democrats	Duygu Cakiroglu	225		
Liberal Democrats	Halime Oruc	169		
Independent	Sabriye Halane Warsame	61		
Turnout			32.3	+1.7
Labour hold		Swing		
Labour hold		Swing		
Labour hold		Swing		

=== Whitewebbs ===
Whitewebbs (3)
Party	Candidate	Votes	%	±%
Conservative	Reece Fox	2,565		
Conservative	Maxwell Day	2,540		
Conservative	Eralda Qirjo	2,320		
Green	Terry O'Dwyer	1,165		
Green	Andrea Sibers	1,160		
Green	Will Tadros	1,071		
Labour	Judy Ellerby	805		
Labour	Andrew Hartley	744		
Labour	Mustafa Kirac	686		
Reform	Stephen Bird	649		
Reform	Deborah Cairns	569		
Reform	Stephen Payne	505		
Liberal Democrats	Tim Martin	279		
Liberal Democrats	Thomas Hawkins	263		
Liberal Democrats	Edmund Pringle	227		
Turnout			29.3	−16.3
Conservative hold		Swing		
Conservative hold		Swing		
Conservative hold		Swing		

=== Winchmore Hill (2) ===
Winchmore Hill (2)
Party	Candidate	Votes	%	±%
Conservative	Maria Alexandrou	1,794		
Conservative	Lee Chamberlain	1,622		
Green	Madeline Baugh	808		
Labour	Annie Powell	668		
Green	William Anthony Linton	663		
Labour	Mark Quinn	558		
Reform	Mark Eves	392		
Liberal Democrats	Matt J. McLaren	322		
Reform	Navtaij Singh Sangha	289		
Liberal Democrats	Ayfer Orhan	249		
Turnout			50.2	+2.4
Conservative hold		Swing		
Conservative hold		Swing		
