= Ridgeway (Enfield ward) =

Electoral ward in London, England

- Electoral ward for the Enfield London Borough Council
- Borough: Enfield
- County: Greater London
- Population: 12,534 (2021)
- Major settlements: Ridgeway
- Area: 16.53 km²

Current electoral ward
- Created: 2022
- Councillors: 3

Ridgeway is an electoral ward in the London Borough of Enfield. The ward was first used in the 2022 elections and elects three councillors to Enfield London Borough Council.

== Geography ==
The ward is named after the Ridgeway area.

== Councillors ==
Election	Councillors		
2022	Joanne Laban (Conservative)	Edward Smith (Conservative)	Andrew Thorp (Conservative)

== Elections ==
=== 2026 ===
Ridgeway (3)
Party	Candidate	Votes	%	±%
Reform	Russell Berndes			
Labour	Beren Dursun			
Reform	Emileo Fernandez			
Labour	Ian Hamilton			
Labour	Christopher James			
Conservative	Joanne Laban			
Liberal Democrats	Daniel Lansbury			
Green	Emily Rainbow			
Green	Martin Reed			
Conservative	Edward Smith			
Reform	James Stanton			
Green	Conor Sullivan			
Conservative	Andrew Thorp			
Liberal Democrats	David Turner			
Liberal Democrats	Surraiya Zia			
Turnout				

=== 2022 ===
Ridgeway (3)
Party	Candidate	Votes	%	±%
Conservative	Joanne Laban	2,541	60.7	
Conservative	Andrew James Thorp	2,502	59.7	
Conservative	Edward Smith	2,427	57.9	
Labour	Simon Pearce	1,060	25.3	
Labour	Zeynep Aksanoglu	1,012	24.2	
Labour	Yalcin Aksanoglu	940	22.4	
Green	Hugh Small	682	16.3	
Liberal Democrats	Hilary Kidman	563	13.4	
Liberal Democrats	Alan Stainer	393	9.4	
Liberal Democrats	Lorice Stainer	357	8.5	
Reform	Jeff Evans	88	2.1	
Rejected ballots		4	0.0	
Turnout			46.0	
Conservative win (new seat)				
Conservative win (new seat)				
Conservative win (new seat)				
