= Arnos Grove (ward) =

Electoral ward in London, England

- Electoral ward for the Enfield London Borough Council
- Borough: Enfield
- County: Greater London
- Population: 8,218 (2021)
- Major settlements: Arnos Grove
- Area: 1.784 km²

Current electoral ward
- Created: 2022
- Councillors: 2

Arnos Grove is an electoral ward in the London Borough of Enfield. The ward was first used in the 2022 elections and elects two councillors to Enfield London Borough Council.

== Geography ==
The ward is named after the suburb of Arnos Grove.

Election	Councillors			
2022	Adrian Grumi	Conservative	Paul Pratt	Conservative
2026	Paul Pratt	Conservative	Shyam Lennon	Conservative

== Elections ==
=== 2026 ===
Arnos Grove (2)
Party	Candidate	Votes	%	±%
Conservative	Paul Pratt	1,332		
Conservative	Shyamala Lennon	1,253		
Green	John Philip Shields	637		
Labour	Shamshia Ali	618		
Green	Jon Wright	589		
Labour	Andrew Gilbert	587		
Reform	Donald Farquharson Berry	272		
Liberal Democrats	Joan Bushill	248		
Liberal Democrats	Chris Bushill	243		
Reform	Eugene Secchi	224		
Turnout			49.1	+2.1
Conservative hold		Swing		
Conservative hold		Swing		

=== 2022 ===
Arnos Grove (2)
Party	Candidate	Votes	%	±%
Conservative	Adrian Grumi	1,296	45.4	
Conservative	Paul Pratt	1,295	45.4	
Labour	Nneka Keazor	982	34.4	
Labour	Mahtab Uddin	846	29.6	
Liberal Democrats	Joan Bushill	504	17.7	
Liberal Democrats	Chris Bushill	464	16.3	
Green	Rodney Campbell	323	11.3	
Turnout			47.0	
Conservative win (new seat)				
Conservative win (new seat)				
