= New Southgate (ward) =

Electoral ward in London, England

- Electoral ward for the Enfield London Borough Council
- Borough: Enfield
- County: Greater London
- Population: 11,907 (2021)
- Major settlements: New Southgate
- Area: 1.207 km²

Current electoral ward
- Created: 2022
- Number of members: 2
- Councillors: Laura Davenport; Madeline Church

New Southgate is an electoral ward in the London Borough of Enfield. The ward was first used in the 2022 elections and elects two councillors to Enfield London Borough Council.

== Geography ==
The ward is named after the suburb of New Southgate.

== Councillors ==
Election	Councillors	
2022	Josh Abey (Labour)	Nelly Gyosheva (Labour)
2026	Laura Davenport (Green Party)	Madeline Church (Green Party)

== Elections ==
=== 2026 ===
New Southgate (2)
Party	Candidate	Votes	%	±%
Green	Laura Davenport	1,205		
Green	Madeline Church	1,146		
Labour	Nelly Gyosheva	1,017		
Labour	Hass Yusuf	862		
Conservative	Andrew Beale	552		
Conservative	John Ennis	477		
Reform	James Michael Doolan	304		
Reform	Shelley Jane Doolan	274		
Liberal Democrats	Diana Medlicott	223		
Liberal Democrats	George Kourtellaris	209		
Independent	Nadeen Stockhouse	45		
TUSC	Joselene Peres	26		
Turnout			42.7	+2.0
Green gain from Labour		Swing		
Green gain from Labour		Swing		

=== 2022 ===
New Southgate (2)
Party	Candidate	Votes	%	±%
Labour	Josh Abey	1,541	51.7	
Labour	Nelly Gyosheva	1,419	47.6	
Conservative	Margaret Brady	821	27.6	
Conservative	Kiran Mistry	812	27.2	
Green	Laura Davenport	491	16.5	
Green	Anne Brown	309	10.4	
Liberal Democrats	Lee Atkinson	294	9.9	
Liberal Democrats	Laura Monk	273	9.2	
Turnout			40.7	
Labour win (new seat)				
Labour win (new seat)				
