= Lower Edmonton (ward) =

Electoral ward in London, England

- Electoral ward for the Enfield London Borough Council
- Borough: Enfield
- County: Greater London
- Population: 16,555 (2021)
- Major settlements: Lower Edmonton in Edmonton, London
- Area: 2.212 km²

Current electoral ward
- Created: 2002
- Councillors: 3

Lower Edmonton is an electoral ward in the London Borough of Enfield. The ward was first used in the 2002 elections and elects three councillors to Enfield London Borough Council.

== Geography ==
The ward is named after the suburb of Lower Edmonton in Edmonton, London.

== Councillors ==
Election	Councillors		
2022	Sinan Boztas (Labour)	Guney Dogan (Labour)	Elif Erbil (Labour)

== Elections ==
=== 2026 ===
Lower Edmonton (3)
Party	Candidate	Votes	%	±%
Green	Georgina Bavetta			
Conservative	Thomas Bellas			
Labour	Sinan Boztas			
Liberal Democrats	Sevda Bulduk			
Conservative	Patrick Drysdale			
Labour	Siddo Dwyer			
Labour	Elif Erbil			
Enfield Community Independents	Sharron Hope			
Reform	Mariya Kochankova			
Liberal Democrats	Sudha Matta			
Liberal Democrats	Aidan Neligan			
Enfield Community Independents	Sarah Onifade			
Reform	Paula Philippou			
Reform	Suleyman Polat			
Conservative	Louise Rodway			
Turnout				

=== 2022 ===
Lower Edmonton (3)
Party	Candidate	Votes	%	±%
Labour	Sinan Boztas	1,939	70.7	
Labour	Guney Dogan	1,889	68.9	
Labour	Elif Erbil	1,839	67.1	
Conservative	Anne Bagulay	567	20.7	
Conservative	Lindsay Rawlings	517	18.9	
Conservative	Dennis Stacey	487	17.8	
Green	Joe Phillips	355	12.9	
Liberal Democrats	John MacRory	257	9.4	
Liberal Democrats	Aidan Neligan	198	7.2	
Liberal Democrats	James Rooke	177	6.5	
Turnout			28.5	
Labour hold		Swing		
Labour hold		Swing		
Labour hold		Swing		
