= Cockfosters (ward) =

Electoral ward in London, England

- Electoral ward for the Enfield London Borough Council
- Borough: Enfield
- County: Greater London
- Population: 10,607 (2021)
- Major settlements: Cockfosters
- Area: 9.409 km²

Current electoral ward
- Created: 2002
- Councillors: 2 (since 2022); 3 (2002-2022)

Cockfosters is an electoral ward in the London Borough of Enfield. The ward was first used in the 2002 elections and elects three councillors to Enfield London Borough Council.

== Geography ==
The ward is named after the suburb of Cockfosters.

== Councillors ==
Election	Councillors	
2022	Alessandro Georgiou (Conservative)	Ruby Sampson (Conservative)

== Elections ==
=== 2026 ===
Cockfosters (2)
Party	Candidate	Votes	%	±%
Labour	Arzu Aydemir			
Conservative	Alara Ayyildiz			
Liberal Democrats	Mutlu Beyzade			
Reform	Felicity Brown			
Liberal Democrats	Brian Cronk			
Conservative	Alessandro Georgiou			
Reform	Samuel Norris			
Green	Caley Powell-Mitchell-Dolby			
Labour	Paul Shaverin			
Turnout				

=== 2022 ===
Cockfosters (2)
Party	Candidate	Votes	%	±%
Conservative	Alessandro Georgiou	1,707	62.2	
Conservative	Ruby Sampson	1,544	56.2	
Labour	Joe Carberry	750	27.3	
Labour	Paul Shaverin	650	23.7	
Green	Bill Linton	306	11.1	
Liberal Democrats	Anne Viney	274	10.0	
Liberal Democrats	Steve Stavirinou	262	9.5	
Turnout			38.4	
Conservative hold		Swing		
Conservative hold		Swing		
