= Bullsmoor (ward) =

- Electoral ward for the Enfield London Borough Council
- Bullsmoor ward boundaries since 2022
- Borough: Enfield
- County: Greater London
- Population: 11,456 (2021) (Note: 2021 Census data reported for 2022 ward boundaries)
- Electorate: 7,434 (2022)
- Area: 1.718 square kilometres (0.663 sq mi)

Current electoral ward
- Councillors: Kate Anolue; Destiny Karakus
- GSS code: E05013675 (2022–present)

Bullsmoor is an electoral ward in the London Borough of Enfield. It returns councillors to Enfield London Borough Council. The ward was originally created in 1965 and abolished in 2002. It was created again in 2022

== Enfield council elections since 2022 ==
There was a revision of ward boundaries in Enfield in 2022.

=== 2026 ===
Bullsmoor (2)
Party	Candidate	Votes	%	±%
Conservative	Margaret Brady			
Liberal Democrats	Anthony Damianou			
Reform	Richard Davey			
TUSC	Bea Gardner Asker			
Labour	Destiny Karakus			
Reform	John Lacey-Smith			
Liberal Democrats	Adonaï Mungombe			
Labour	Faye Nimoh			
Conservative	Millie Okeke			
Green	Tessa Stewart			
Green	Jocelyn Whittaker-Smith			
Turnout				

=== 2023 by-election ===
The by-election took place on 20 April 2023, following the resignation of Esin Gunes.

2023 Bullsmoor by-election
Party	Candidate	Votes	%	±%
Labour	Destiny Karakus	1,056	55.8	
Conservative	Christine Bellas	686	36.2	
Green	Isobel Whittaker	81	4.3	
Liberal Democrats	Tim Martin	50	2.6	
TUSC	John Dolan	20	1.1	
Majority		370	19.5	
Turnout		1,893		
Labour hold		Swing		

=== 2022 election ===
The election took place on 5 May 2022.

2022 Enfield London Borough Council election: Bullsmoor
Party	Candidate	Votes	%	±%
Labour	Kate Anolue	1,307	58.8	
Labour	Esin Gunes	1,192	53.6	
Conservative	Christine Bellas	761	34.2	
Conservative	Thomas Bellas	703	31.6	
Green	Isobel Whittaker	241	10.8	
Liberal Democrats	Gunseli Erdogan	193	8.7	
TUSC	Ian Pattison	50	2.2	
Turnout			31.6	
Labour win (new seat)				
Labour win (new seat)				
