= Winchmore Hill (ward) =

Electoral ward in London, England

- Electoral ward for the Enfield London Borough Council
- Borough: Enfield
- County: Greater London
- Population: 10,398 (2021)
- Major settlements: Bush Hill Park
- Area: 2.161 km²

Current electoral ward
- Created: 1965
- Councillors: 2 (since 2022); 3 (2002-2022); 2 (until 2002)

Winchmore Hill is an electoral ward in the London Borough of Enfield. The ward was first used in the 1964 elections and elects two councillors to Enfield London Borough Council.

== Geography ==
The ward is named after the suburb of Winchmore Hill.

== Councillors ==
Election	Councillors		
2014	Dinah Barry (Labour)	Elaine Hayward (Conservative)	Ertan Hurer (Conservative)
2018	Dinah Barry (Labour)	Ian Barnes (Labour)	Maria Alexandrou (Conservative)
2022	Maria Alexandrou (Conservative)		Lee Chamberlain (Conservative)
2026	Maria Alexandrou (Conservative)		Lee Chamberlain (Conservative)

== Elections ==
=== 2026 ===
Winchmore Hill (2)
Party	Candidate	Votes	%	±%
Conservative	Maria Alexandrou	1,794		
Conservative	Lee Chamberlain	1,622		
Green	Madeline Baugh	808		
Labour	Annie Powell	668		
Green	William Anthony Linton	663		
Labour	Mark Quinn	558		
Reform	Mark Eves	392		
Liberal Democrats	Matt J. McLaren	322		
Reform	Navtaij Singh Sangha	289		
Liberal Democrats	Ayfer Orhan	249		
Turnout			50.2	+2.4
Conservative hold		Swing		
Conservative hold		Swing		

=== 2022 ===
Winchmore Hill (2)
Party	Candidate	Votes	%	±%
Conservative	Maria Alexandrou	1,899	54.7	
Conservative	Lee Chamberlain	1,725	49.7	
Labour	Carl Bayliss	996	28.7	
Labour	Mark Quinn	948	27.3	
Liberal Democrats	Matt J. McLaren	483	13.9	
Green	Jonathan Molloy	470	13.5	
Liberal Democrats	Andy Stainton	420	12.1	
Turnout			47.8	
Conservative hold		Swing		
Conservative gain from Labour		Swing		
