= Southbury (ward) =

Electoral ward in London, England

- Electoral ward for the Enfield London Borough Council
- Southbury ward boundaries since 2022
- Borough: Enfield
- County: Greater London
- Population: 15,910 (2021)
- Major settlements: Enfield
- Area: 2.414 km²

Current electoral ward
- Created: 1982
- Councillors: 3 (since 2002); 2 (1982-2002)
- GSS code: E05013691 (2022–present)

Southbury is an electoral ward in the London Borough of Enfield. The ward was first used in the 1982 elections and elects three councillors to Enfield London Borough Council.

== Councillors ==
Election	Councillors		
2022	Mahmut Aksanoglu (Labour)	Ayten Guzel (Labour)	Rick Jewell (Labour)
2026	Penny Heathwood (Conservative)	Betty Achayo (Conservative)	Benny Neza (Conservative)

== Elections ==
=== 2026 ===
Southbury (3)
Party	Candidate	Votes	%	±%
Conservative	Penny Heathwood	1,545		
Conservative	Betty Achayo	1,530		
Conservative	Benny Neza	1,422		
Green	Mueez Abdurrahman	1,076		
Labour	Rick Jewell	1,070		
Labour	Hanim Akdemir	1,056		
Green	Antonio Favata	1,050		
Green	Steve Rawlinson	1,041		
Labour	Mahmut Aksanoglu	1,019		
Reform	Robert Edward Landragin	519		
Reform	Andrew Dale Law	519		
Reform	Milcho Danailov	491		
Liberal Democrats	Nick Bromley	258		
Liberal Democrats	Stephen William Driver	206		
Liberal Democrats	Syed A Saboor	134		
TUSC	Paul John Kershaw	57		
Turnout			43.9	+8.9
Conservative gain from Labour		Swing		
Conservative gain from Labour		Swing		
Conservative gain from Labour		Swing		

=== 2022 ===
Southbury (3)
Party	Candidate	Votes	%	±%
Labour	Rick Jewell	1,714	50.3	
Labour	Mahmut Aksanoglu	1,705	50.0	
Labour	Ayten Guzel	1,692	49.6	
Conservative	Patrick Drysdale	1,225	35.9	
Conservative	Penelope Heathwood	1,214	35.6	
Conservative	Arben Neza	1,116	32.7	
Green	Sunaina Rishi	518	15.2	
Liberal Democrats	Alexander Rader	311	9.1	
Liberal Democrats	Stephen Viney	281	8.2	
Liberal Democrats	Mansoor Mir	259	7.6	
TUSC	John Dolan	126	3.7	
Freedom Alliance	Gwyneth Rolph	69	2.0	
Turnout			35.0	
Labour hold		Swing		
Labour hold		Swing		
Labour hold		Swing		
