= Town (Enfield ward) =

Electoral ward in London, England

- Electoral ward for the Enfield London Borough Council
- Borough: Enfield
- County: Greater London
- Population: 13,517 (2021)
- Major settlements: Enfield, London
- Area: 2.060 km²

Current electoral ward
- Created: 1965
- Councillors: 3

Town is an electoral ward in the London Borough of Enfield. The ward was first used in the 1964 elections and elects three councillors to Enfield London Borough Council.

== Geography ==
The ward is named after the town of Enfield, London.

== Councillors ==
Election	Councillors		
2022	Michael Rye (Conservative)	James Steven (Conservative)	Emma Supple (Conservative)

== Elections ==
=== 2026 ===
Town (3)
Party	Candidate	Votes	%	±%
Conservative	Michael Jeremy Rye	2,040		
Conservative	Emma Supple	1,981		
Conservative	Kiran Mistry	1,878		
Green	Lesley Elizabeth Hill	1,247		
Green	Josh Emerson	1,218		
Green	Dave Sandham	1,118		
Labour	Jacob Persaud	769		
Labour	Alanna Rahimi	754		
Labour	Graham Taylor	734		
Reform	Scott Cummines	611		
Reform	Jeff Evans	595		
Reform	Paul Hennin	579		
Liberal Democrats	Rob Aaron-Wilson	504		
Liberal Democrats	Lauren Fulbright	501		
Liberal Democrats	Paul Meehan	439		
Turnout			52.5	+8.1
Conservative hold		Swing		
Conservative hold		Swing		
Conservative hold		Swing		

=== 2022 election ===
2022 Enfield London Borough Council election: Town (3)
Party	Candidate	Votes	%	±%
Conservative	Michael Rye	1,980	49.0	
Conservative	Emma Supple	1,963	48.5	
Conservative	James Steven	1,924	47.6	
Labour	Chris Cole	1,464	36.2	
Labour	Jacob Persaud	1,423	35.2	
Labour	Sibel Ozcelik	1,297	32.1	
Green	Kay Heather	842	20.8	
Liberal Democrats	Tim Martin	484	12.0	
Liberal Democrats	Ausilia Le'cand-Harwood	413	10.2	
Liberal Democrats	Christopher Le'cand-Harwood	342	8.5	
Turnout			44.4	
Conservative hold		Swing		
Conservative hold		Swing		
Conservative hold		Swing		
