= Bowes (ward) =

Electoral ward in London, England

- Electoral ward for the Enfield London Borough Council
- Borough: Enfield
- County: Greater London
- Population: 10,791 (2021)
- Area: 1.290 km²

Current electoral ward
- Created: 1965
- Councillors: 2

Bowes is an electoral ward in the London Borough of Enfield. The ward was first used in the 1964 elections and elects two councillors to Enfield London Borough Council.

== Geography ==
The ward is named after the area of Bowes Road.

== Councillors ==
Election	Councillors	
2022	Gina Needs (Labour)	Ahmet Oykener (Labour)
2026	Alex Diner (Labour)	Dino Lemonides (Conservative)

== Elections ==
=== 2026 ===
Bowes (2)
Party	Candidate	Votes	%	±%
Labour	Alex Diner	825		
Conservative	Dino Lemonides	757		
Conservative	Ediz Mevlit	740		
Green	Helen Linda Karamallakis	733		
Labour	Kakoly Pande	696		
Green	Dan Stachow	592		
Reform	Mark Brobyn	217		
Liberal Democrats	Steve Stavrinou	137		
Reform	Heidi Voorbraeck	136		
Liberal Democrats	Steven Adderley	132		
TUSC	Karl Vidol	38		
Turnout			37.8	+4.8
Labour hold		Swing		
Conservative gain from Labour		Swing		

=== 2022 ===
Bowes (2)
Party	Candidate	Votes	%	±%
Labour	Gina Needs	1,139	51.7	
Labour	Ahmet Oykener	1,082	49.1	
Conservative	Peter Charalambous	746	33.8	
Conservative	Ediz Mevlit	721	32.7	
Green	Daniel Stachow	301	13.7	
Liberal Democrats	Jane Atkinson	241	10.9	
Liberal Democrats	Margaret Steel	180	8.2	
Turnout			33.0	
Labour hold		Swing		
Labour hold		Swing		
