= Palmers Green (ward) =

Electoral ward in London, England

- Electoral ward for the Enfield London Borough Council
- Borough: Enfield
- County: Greater London
- Population: 11,014 (2021)
- Major settlements: Palmers Green
- Area: 1.296 km²

Current electoral ward
- Created: 1965
- Councillors: 2

Palmers Green is an electoral ward in the London Borough of Enfield. The ward was first used in the 1964 elections and elects two councillors to Enfield London Borough Council.

== Geography ==
The ward is named after the suburb of Palmers Green.

== Councillors ==
Election	Councillors	
2022	Chris James (Labour)	Douglas Taylor (Labour)

== Elections ==
=== 2026 ===
Palmers Green (2)
Party	Candidate	Votes	%	±%
Green	Ben Bleet			
Conservative	Angela Evangelou			
Reform	Nigel Gibbs			
Labour	Chris James			
Liberal Democrats	Tony Kidman			
Green	Brendan Lee			
Liberal Democrats	Richard Mapleston			
TUSC	Oscar Parry			
Conservative	Jonny Ross			
Reform	John Sime			
Labour	Doug Taylor			
Turnout				

=== 2022 ===
Palmers Green (2)
Party	Candidate	Votes	%	±%
Labour	Chris James	1,511	49.6	
Labour	Douglas Taylor	1,433	47.0	
Conservative	Shyamala Lennon	862	28.3	
Conservative	Ertan Hurer	783	25.7	
Liberal Democrats	Brendan Malone	407	13.4	
Liberal Democrats	Mutlu Beyzade	346	11.4	
Green	Basil Clarke	340	11.2	
Green	Nicholas Wall	322	10.6	
Freedom Alliance	Angela Lewis-Wright	47	1.5	
TUSC	Nicholas Haojipateras	44	1.4	
Turnout			43.1	
Labour hold		Swing		
Labour hold		Swing		
