= Enfield London Borough Council =

Local government in London, England

- Coat of Arms

Type
- Type: London borough council of the London Borough of Enfield
- Houses: Unicameral

Leadership
- Mayor: Emma Supple, Conservative since 27 May 2026
- Leader: Alessandro Georgiou, Conservative since 27 May 2026
- Chief Executive: Perry Scott since March 2025

Structure
- Seats: 63 councillors
- Political groups: Administration (minority) (31) Conservative (31) Opposition (32) Labour (27) Green (5)
- Length of term: Whole council elected every four years

Elections
- Voting system: Plurality at-large (FPTP)
- Last election: 7 May 2026
- Next election: 2 May 2030

Meeting place
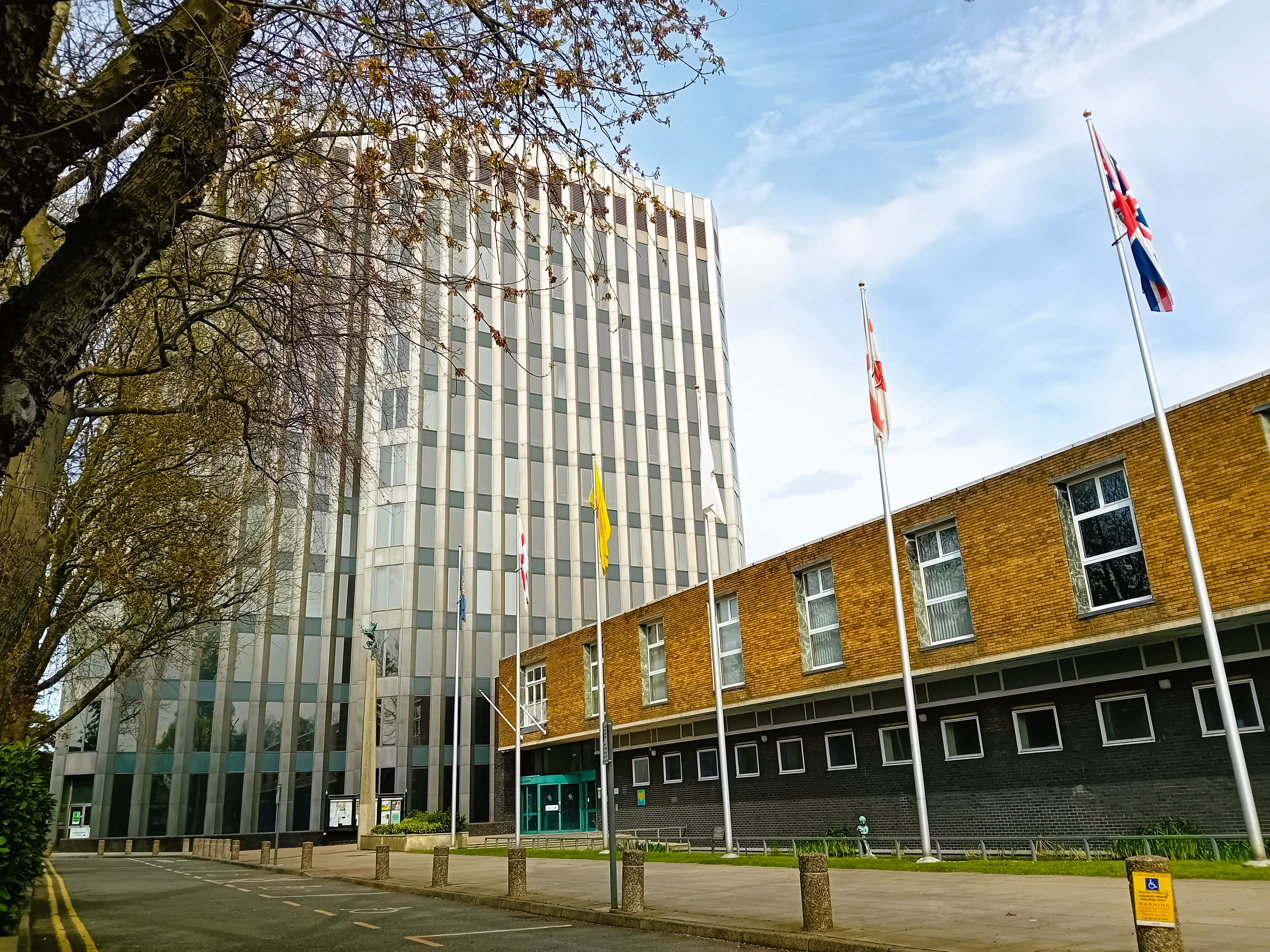
- Civic Centre, Silver Street, Enfield, EN1 3XA

Website
- www.enfield.gov.uk

Enfield London Borough Council, known as Enfield Council, is the local authority for the London Borough of Enfield in Greater London, England, based at Enfield Civic Centre in Enfield Town. The council is responsible for the provision of a range of services within the borough. The council has been under Conservative minority administration following the 2026 election. Prior to this, it had been under Labour control since 2010.

== History ==
The first elected local authority for Enfield was a local board, established in 1850. Such boards were reconstituted as urban district councils under the Local Government Act 1894. Enfield was then incorporated to become a municipal borough in 1955, after which it was governed by a body formally called the "Mayor, Aldermen and Burgesses of the Borough of Enfield", generally known as the corporation or borough council.

The much larger London Borough of Enfield and its council were created under the London Government Act 1963, with the first election held in 1964. For its first year the council acted as a shadow authority alongside the area's three outgoing authorities, being the borough councils of Enfield, Edmonton and Southgate. The new council formally came into its powers on 1 April 1965, at which point the old boroughs and their councils were abolished. The council's full legal name is "The Mayor and Burgesses of the London Borough of Enfield".

From 1965 until 1986 the council was a lower-tier authority, with upper-tier functions provided by the Greater London Council. The split of powers and functions meant that the Greater London Council was responsible for "wide area" services such as fire, ambulance, flood prevention, and refuse disposal; with the boroughs (including Enfield) responsible for "personal" services such as social care, libraries, cemeteries and refuse collection. As an outer London borough council Enfield has been a local education authority since 1965. The Greater London Council was abolished in 1986 and its functions passed to the London Boroughs, with some services provided through joint committees.

Since 2000 the Greater London Authority has taken some responsibility for highways and planning control from the council, but within the English local government system the council remains a "most purpose" authority in terms of the available range of powers and functions.

== Governance ==
The local authority derives its powers and functions from the London Government Act 1963 and subsequent legislation, and has the powers and functions of a London borough council. It sets council tax and as a billing authority it also collects precepts for Greater London Authority functions and business rates. It sets planning policies which complement Greater London Authority and national policies, and decides on almost all planning applications accordingly. It is also the local education authority.

=== Political control ===
The council went under no overall control at the 2026 election, after which a minority Conservative administration formed to lead the council.

The first election was held in 1964, initially operating as a shadow authority alongside the outgoing authorities until it came into its powers on 1 April 1965. Political control of the council since 1965 has been as follows:

Party in control	Years
Labour	1965–1968
Conservative	1968–1994
Labour	1994–2002
Conservative	2002–2010
Labour	2010–2026
No overall control	2026–present

=== Leadership ===
The role of Mayor of Enfield is largely ceremonial. Political leadership is instead provided by the leader of the council. The leaders since 1965 have been:

Councillor	Party	From	To
Ted Graham	Labour	1965	1966
Eric Smythe	Labour	1966	1968
Alan Young	Conservative	1968	1987
John Lindsay	Conservative	1987	1988
Graham Eustance	Conservative	1988	1994
Jeff Rodin	Labour	1994	1999
Doug Taylor	Labour	1999	2002
Mike Rye	Conservative	2002	2010
Doug Taylor	Labour	2010	May 2018
Nesil Caliskan	Labour	23 May 2018	9 Aug 2024
Ergin Erbil	Labour	9 Aug 2024	27 May 2026
Alessandro Georgiou	Conservative	27 May 2026	

=== Composition ===
Following the 2026 election, the composition of the council is as follows:

Party	Councillors
Conservative	31
Labour	27
Green	5
Total	63

The next election is due in May 2030.

== Wards ==
The wards of Enfield and the number of seats:

1. Arnos Grove (2)
2. Bowes (2)
3. Brimsdown (3)
4. Bullsmoor (2)
5. Bush Hill Park (3)
6. Carterhatch (2)
7. Cockfosters (2)
8. Edmonton Green (3)
9. Enfield Lock (3)
10. Grange Park (2)
11. Haselbury (3)
12. Highfield (2)
13. Jubilee (3)
14. Lower Edmonton (3)
15. New Southgate (2)
16. Oakwood (2)
17. Palmers Green (2)
18. Ponders End (2)
19. Ridgeway (3)
20. Southbury (3)
21. Southgate (3)
22. Town (3)
23. Upper Edmonton (3)
24. Whitewebbs (3)
25. Winchmore Hill (2)

== Elections ==
Since the last boundary changes in 2022 the council has comprised 63 councillors representing 25 wards, with each ward electing two or three councillors. Elections are held every four years.

== Premises ==
The council is based at Enfield Civic Centre on Silver Street, which had originally been completed in 1961 for the old Enfield Borough Council. The building was later significantly extended with a 12 storey tower block, which was completed in 1975.
