= 2022 Enfield London Borough Council election =

2022 local election in Enfield

2022 Enfield Council election
- 5 May 2022

All 63 council seats
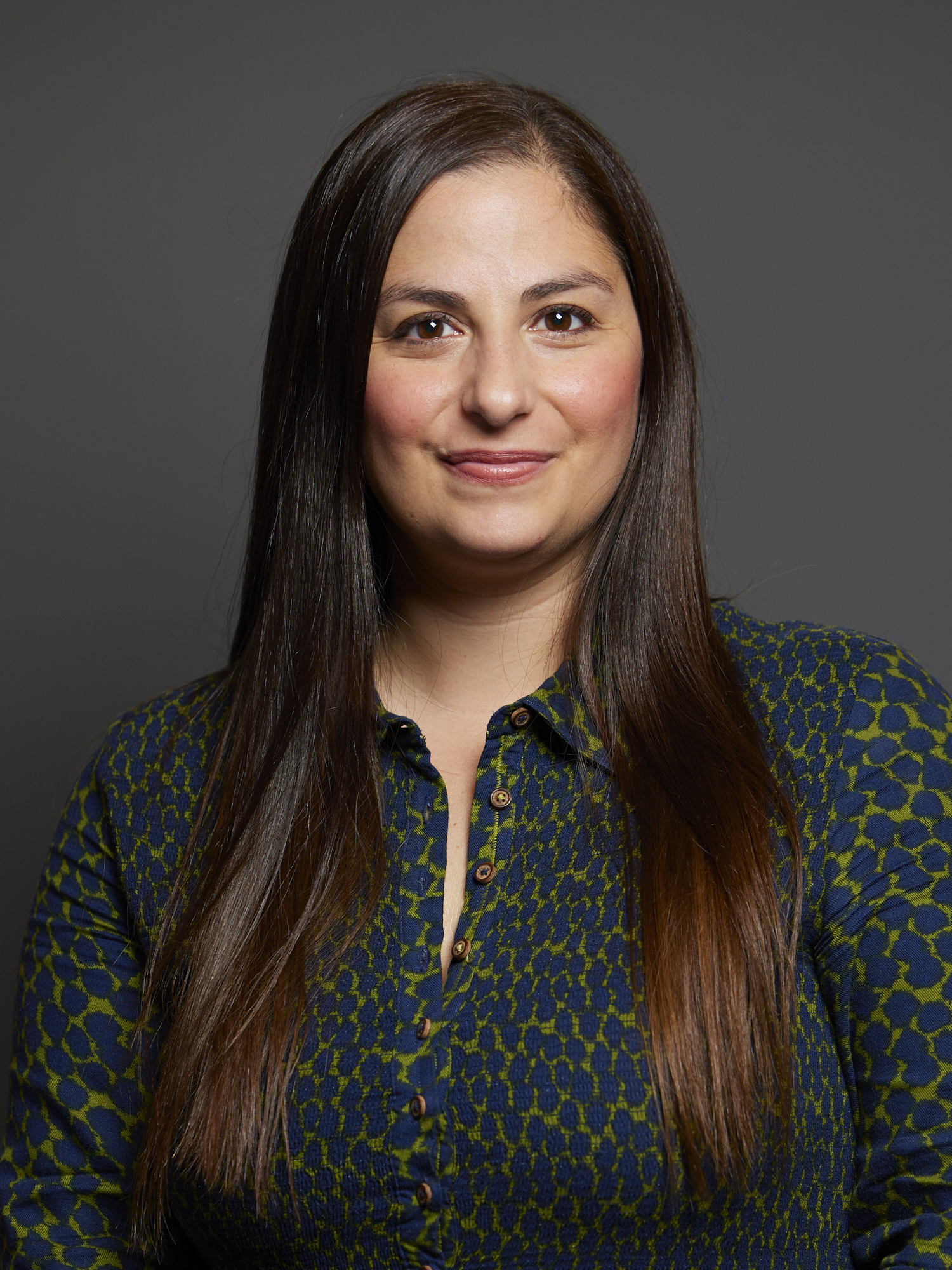
	First party	Second party
Leader	Nesil Caliskan	Joanne Laban
Party	Labour	Conservative
Last election	46 seats, 54.9%	17 seats, 35.2%
Seats won	38	25
Seat change	▼8	▲8
- Map of the results of the 2022 Enfield London Borough Council election. Conservatives in blue, Labour in red.
council control before election
Labour
Subsequent council control
Labour

The 2022 Enfield London Borough Council election took place on 5 May 2022, alongside local elections in the other London boroughs and elections to local authorities across the United Kingdom. All 63 members of Enfield London Borough Council were elected.

In the previous election in 2018, the Labour Party maintained its control of the council, winning 46 out of the 63 seats with the Conservative Party forming the council opposition with the remaining 17 seats. The 2022 election took place under new election boundaries, which however kept the same number of councillors as before. In 2022, Labour was re-elected for a fourth term. This was the first time that Labour was re-elected with a reduced number of seats ever since the London Boroughs were created in 1964.

== Background ==
=== History ===
Result of the 2018 borough election

The thirty-two London boroughs were established in 1965 by the London Government Act 1963. They are the principal authorities in Greater London and have responsibilities including education, housing, planning, highways, social services, libraries, recreation, waste, environmental health and revenue collection. Some of the powers are shared with the Greater London Authority, which also manages passenger transport, police and fire.

Since its formation, Enfield has been under Labour or Conservative control. Most councillors elected to the council have been Labour or Conservative. The council has had an overall Labour majority since the 2010 election, in which Labour won 36 seats and the Conservatives won 27. Save Chase Farm lost both their seats. Labour increased its majority on the council in both subsequent elections in 2014 and 2018, winning 46 seats with 54.9% of the vote to the Conservatives' seventeen with 35.2% of the vote in the latter.

=== Council term ===
After the 2018 local election, the Labour group voted by 24 votes to 22 to replace their leader Doug Taylor with Nesil Caliskan, who consequently became the leader of the council. She became the borough's first female leader and the youngest council leader in London. In May 2019, her deputy leader Daniel Anderson and four other cabinet members stood down from the council's executive, with Anderson saying he had "been emasculated".

In July 2018, Stephanos Ioannou, a Conservative councillor for Southgate ward, was suspended from the party for sharing a 1974 newspaper frontpage covering the Turkish invasion of Cyprus with the headline "Barbarians". In September 2018, William Coleshill, a Conservative councillor for Bush Hill Park, was suspended from his party after being accused of making racist comments. Later the same month, another Conservative councillor for Bush Hill Park, Jon Daniels, resigned citing his work and family commitments. A by-election to replace him was held in November 2018, which was won by the Conservative candidate, the small business owner James Hockney. The Labour councillor Ayfer Orhan was suspended from her party in March 2019 after she shared a tweet claiming that Israel was supporting the Islamic State.

In 2019, Caliskan was found to have broken the council code of conduct after the conduct committee found that her suspension of a cabinet member without meeting her first amounted to bullying, a finding she unsuccessfully appealed. In March 2020, Anderson was found to have broken the council code of conduct after complaints from council officers that his behaviour was "aggressive and threatening" and "amounted to bullying". He was subsequently suspended from the Labour Party. In July 2020, the Labour councillor Chris Bond died. He had been a councillor in Enfield for more than 34 years. Due to the COVID-19 pandemic, a by-election to replace him could not be held until May 2021.

In 2020, two Labour councillors who had supported Taylor over Caliskan, Derek Levy and Dinah Barry, left the Labour Party to form a new group on the council called Community First, saying that "the leadership of Enfield Labour group had effectively frozen them out of discussions on policy". Anderson joined them in August, also criticising Caliskan. A fourth Labour councillor, Dino Lemonides, joined Community First less than a week later calling the Labour group "authoritarian". In December 2020, Vicki Pite, a Labour councillor for Chase ward resigned from the council while remaining a Labour member. In March 2021, one Labour councillor, Anne Brown, defected to Community First, and another, Bernadette Lappage, resigned from the council. By-elections to replace Bond, Pite and Lappage were all held on 5 May 2021 alongside the 2021 London mayoral election and London Assembly election. Bond's seat was won by the Labour candidate, Ayten Guzel. Pite's seat was gained by the Conservative candidate Andrew Thorp, who had campaigned to protect Whitewebbs golf course. Lappage's seat was won by the Labour candidate Chinelo Anyanwu.

Later in May 2021, a Labour councillor, Charith Gunawardena, defected to the Green Party and joined the Community First group on the council. Days later, Orhan resigned from the Labour Party to join Community First shortly before an unsuccessful vote of no confidence in the council's administration. She had taken the Labour Party to court over the length of time it had taken to investigate allegations of antisemitism against her. Coleshill, who had continued to sit as an independent councillor after being suspended from the Conservative Party, was forced to stand down from the council in June 2021 after failing to attend council meetings for six months. A by-election to replace him was held in July 2021, which was won by the Conservative candidate Peter Fallart. In September 2021, Brown joined the Green Party while remaining a member of Community First. In November 2021, Orhan joined the Liberal Democrats while remaining a member of Community First.

Along with most other London boroughs, Enfield was subject to a boundary review ahead of the 2022 election. The Local Government Boundary Commission for England concluded that the council should have 63 seats, the same as previously, and produced new election boundaries following a period of consultation. The council will have thirteen three-councillor wards and twelve two-councillor wards.

== Campaign ==
The Liberal Democrats announced that they would campaign jointly with some independent candidates in an alliance called "Together for Enfield".

== Electoral process ==
Enfield, like other London borough councils, elects all of its councillors at once every four years. The previous election took place in 2018. The election took place by multi-member first-past-the-post voting, with each ward being represented by two or three councillors. Electors had as many votes as there are councillors to be elected in their ward, with the top two or three being elected.

All registered electors (British, Irish, Commonwealth and European Union citizens) living in London aged 18 or were entitled to vote in the election. People who lived at two addresses in different councils, such as university students with different term-time and holiday addresses, were entitled to be registered for and vote in elections in both local authorities. Voting in-person at polling stations took place from 7:00 to 22:00 on election day, and voters were able to apply for postal votes or proxy votes in advance of the election.

== Previous council composition ==
Council composition after the 2018 election

After 2018 election		Before 2022 election	
Party	Seats	Party	Seats
Labour	46	Labour	38
Conservative	17	Conservative	18
		Independent Community First Group	7
		Green	2
		Liberal Democrats	1

== Results summary ==
2022 Enfield London Borough Council election
Party	Seats	Gains	Losses	Net gain/loss	Seats %	Votes %	Votes	+/−
Labour	38	0	3	▼8	60.3	45.5	89,956	-9.3
Conservative	25	3	0	▲8	39.7	36.8	72,657	+1.7
Liberal Democrats	0	0	0	0	0.0	9.7	19,132	+5.5
Green	0	0	0	0	0.0	6.6	13,102	+2.1
Independent	0	0	0	0	0.0	1.0	2,027	+0.5
TUSC	0	0	0	0	0.0	0.2	367	New
Reform	0	0	0	0	0.0	0.1	244	New
Freedom Alliance	0	0	0	0	0.0	0.1	116	New

== Ward results ==
=== Arnos Grove ===
Arnos Grove (2)
Party	Candidate	Votes	%	±%
Conservative	Adrian Grumi	1,296	45.4	
Conservative	Paul Pratt	1,295	45.4	
Labour	Nneka Keazor	982	34.4	
Labour	Mahtab Uddin	846	29.6	
Liberal Democrats	Joan Bushill	504	17.7	
Liberal Democrats	Chris Bushill	464	16.3	
Green	Rodney Campbell	323	11.3	
Turnout			47.0	
Conservative win (new seat)				
Conservative win (new seat)				

=== Bowes ===
Bowes (2)
Party	Candidate	Votes	%	±%
Labour	Gina Needs	1,139	51.7	
Labour	Ahmet Oykener	1,082	49.1	
Conservative	Peter Charalambous	746	33.8	
Conservative	Ediz Mevlit	721	32.7	
Green	Daniel Stachow	301	13.7	
Liberal Democrats	Jane Atkinson	241	10.9	
Liberal Democrats	Margaret Steel	180	8.2	
Turnout			33.0	
Labour hold		Swing		
Labour hold		Swing		

=== Brimsdown ===
Brimsdown (3)
Party	Candidate	Votes	%	±%
Labour	Hivran Dalkaya	1,988	63.3	
Labour	Bektas Ozer	1,883	60.0	
Labour	Ahmet Hasan	1,879	59.9	
Conservative	Michael Lavender	877	27.9	
Conservative	Leval Ainah	856	27.3	
Conservative	Stephen Savva	823	26.2	
Green	Mary Anderson	395	12.6	
Liberal Democrats	Robin Dubow	236	7.5	
Liberal Democrats	Mark Riley	206	6.6	
Liberal Democrats	Tony Kidman	198	6.3	
TUSC	Josh Asker	77	2.5	
Turnout			32.0	
Labour win (new seat)				
Labour win (new seat)				
Labour win (new seat)				

=== Bullsmoor ===
Bullsmoor (2)
Party	Candidate	Votes	%	±%
Labour	Kate Anolue	1,307	58.8	
Labour	Esin Gunes	1,192	53.6	
Conservative	Christine Bellas	761	34.2	
Conservative	Thomas Bellas	703	31.6	
Green	Isobel Whittaker	241	10.8	
Liberal Democrats	Gunseli Erdogan	193	8.7	
TUSC	Ian Pattison	50	2.2	
Turnout			31.6	
Labour win (new seat)				
Labour win (new seat)				

=== Bush Hill Park ===
Bush Hill Park (3)
Party	Candidate	Votes	%	±%
Conservative	James Hockney	2,097	53.8	
Conservative	Peter Fallart	2,071	53.1	
Conservative	Pat Gregory	2,049	52.6	
Labour	Bevin Betton	1,265	32.5	
Labour	Folashade Adeleke	1,220	31.3	
Labour	Huseyin Akpinar	1,130	29.0	
Green	Benjamin Maydon	536	13.8	
Liberal Democrats	Alexander Bassey	443	11.4	
Liberal Democrats	John Martin	419	10.8	
Liberal Democrats	Ade Adetula	392	10.1	
Reform	David Schofield	71	1.8	
Turnout			42.3	
Conservative hold		Swing		
Conservative hold		Swing		
Conservative hold		Swing		

=== Carterhatch ===
Carterhatch (2)
Party	Candidate	Votes	%	±%
Labour	Susan Erbil	1,388	66.1	
Labour	Nawshad Ali	1,325	63.1	
Conservative	Foston Fairclough	532	25.3	
Conservative	Salem Al-Damluji	472	22.5	
Green	Robert Page	218	10.4	
Liberal Democrats	Mary Keh	132	6.3	
Liberal Democrats	Victoria Keh	131	6.2	
Turnout			30.7	
Labour win (new seat)				
Labour win (new seat)				

=== Cockfosters ===
Cockfosters (2)
Party	Candidate	Votes	%	±%
Conservative	Alessandro Georgiou	1,707	62.2	
Conservative	Ruby Sampson	1,544	56.2	
Labour	Joe Carberry	750	27.3	
Labour	Paul Shaverin	650	23.7	
Green	Bill Linton	306	11.1	
Liberal Democrats	Anne Viney	274	10.0	
Liberal Democrats	Steve Stavirinou	262	9.5	
Turnout			38.4	
Conservative hold		Swing		
Conservative hold		Swing		

=== Edmonton Green ===
Edmonton Green (3)
Party	Candidate	Votes	%	±%
Labour	Gunes Akbulut	1,819	62.9	
Labour	Ergin Erbil	1,784	61.7	
Labour	Abdul Abdullahi	1,653	57.2	
Independent	Oktay Cinpolat	866	29.9	
Independent	Telesha Reid	648	22.4	
Conservative	Christine Williams	416	14.4	
Conservative	Andrena Smith	409	14.1	
Conservative	Phivos Joannides	360	12.4	
Green	Peter Krakowiak	330	11.4	
Liberal Democrats	Regine Lemberger	146	5.0	
Liberal Democrats	Paul Meehan	126	4.4	
Liberal Democrats	Lupita Turner	119	4.1	
Turnout			30.5	
Labour hold		Swing		
Labour hold		Swing		
Labour hold		Swing		

=== Enfield Lock ===
Enfield Lock (3)
Party	Candidate	Votes	%	±%
Labour	Suna Hurman	2,077	66.8	
Labour	Eylem Yuruk	1,864	59.9	
Labour	Sabri Ozaydin	1,856	59.7	
Conservative	Maxwell Day	933	30.0	
Conservative	Paul Desmonde	916	29.5	
Conservative	Arthur Bishop-Laggett	870	28.0	
Green	Bernie Rees	486	15.6	
Liberal Democrats	Norman Whitby	328	10.5	
Turnout			30.7	
Labour hold		Swing		
Labour hold		Swing		
Labour hold		Swing		

=== Grange Park ===
Grange Park (2)
Party	Candidate	Votes	%	±%
Conservative	Chris Dey	1,724	58.6	
Conservative	Andy Milne	1,672	56.9	
Labour	Hazel Kinsler	784	26.7	
Labour	Chris James	669	22.8	
Liberal Democrats	Claire Wilson	375	12.8	
Green	Luke Balnave	361	12.3	
Liberal Democrats	Stuart Laycock	294	10.0	
Turnout			47.0	
Conservative win (new seat)				
Conservative win (new seat)				

=== Haselbury ===
Haselbury (3)
Party	Candidate	Votes	%	±%
Labour	Mustafa Cetinkaya	2,039	68.2	
Labour	George Savva	2,019	67.5	
Labour	Mahym Bedekova	2,012	67.3	
Conservative	Clayton Barnes	751	25.1	
Conservative	Clare Spring	694	23.2	
Green	Alison Phillips	579	19.4	
Liberal Democrats	Hannah Dawson	342	11.4	
Liberal Democrats	Richard Morgan-Ash	270	9.0	
Liberal Democrats	Lenuta Abdullah	269	9.0	
Turnout			30.0	
Labour hold		Swing		
Labour hold		Swing		
Labour hold		Swing		

=== Highfield ===
Highfield (2)
Party	Candidate	Votes	%	±%
Labour	Tim Leaver	1,048	45.7	
Labour	Nia Stevens	960	41.9	
Conservative	Jacqueline Campbell	931	40.6	
Conservative	Tolga Suleyman	810	35.3	
Liberal Democrats	Lauren Fulbright	328	14.3	
Liberal Democrats	Darya Paun	258	11.3	
Green	Nicola Rose Scott	248	10.8	
Turnout			35.5	
Labour hold		Swing		
Labour hold		Swing		

=== Jubilee ===
Jubilee (3)
Party	Candidate	Votes	%	±%
Labour	Nesil Caliskan	1,980	65.0	
Labour	Chinelo Anyanwu	1,855	60.9	
Labour	Alev Cazimoglu	1,852	60.8	
Conservative	Glenn Breslin	864	28.4	
Conservative	Frank Greene	786	25.8	
Conservative	Leonard Munasinghe	676	22.2	
Green	Rada Graovac	378	12.4	
Independent	Cemal Sazdili	263	8.6	
Liberal Democrats	Iman Saadoune	230	7.6	
Independent	Sherryton Lewis	129	4.2	
Independent	Don McGowan	121	4.0	
Turnout			32.3	
Labour hold		Swing		
Labour hold		Swing		
Labour hold		Swing		

=== Lower Edmonton ===
Lower Edmonton (3)
Party	Candidate	Votes	%	±%
Labour	Sinan Boztas	1,939	70.7	
Labour	Guney Dogan	1,889	68.9	
Labour	Elif Erbil	1,839	67.1	
Conservative	Anne Bagulay	567	20.7	
Conservative	Lindsay Rawlings	517	18.9	
Conservative	Dennis Stacey	487	17.8	
Green	Joe Phillips	355	12.9	
Liberal Democrats	John MacRory	257	9.4	
Liberal Democrats	Aidan Neligan	198	7.2	
Liberal Democrats	James Rooke	177	6.5	
Turnout			28.5	
Labour hold		Swing		
Labour hold		Swing		
Labour hold		Swing		

=== New Southgate ===
New Southgate (2)
Party	Candidate	Votes	%	±%
Labour	Josh Abey	1,541	51.7	
Labour	Nelly Gyosheva	1,419	47.6	
Conservative	Margaret Brady	821	27.6	
Conservative	Kiran Mistry	812	27.2	
Green	Laura Davenport	491	16.5	
Green	Anne Brown	309	10.4	
Liberal Democrats	Lee Atkinson	294	9.9	
Liberal Democrats	Laura Monk	273	9.2	
Turnout			40.7	
Labour win (new seat)				
Labour win (new seat)				

=== Oakwood ===
Oakwood (2)
Party	Candidate	Votes	%	±%
Conservative	Tom O'Halloran	1,330	52.6	
Conservative	Julian Sampson	1,319	52.2	
Labour	Angie McEvoy	839	33.2	
Labour	Karl Vidol	694	27.5	
Green	Kevin Wilson	309	12.2	
Liberal Democrats	David Peters	288	11.4	
Liberal Democrats	Brian Cronk	276	10.9	
Turnout			41.6	
Conservative win (new seat)				
Conservative win (new seat)				

=== Palmers Green ===
Palmers Green (2)
Party	Candidate	Votes	%	±%
Labour	Chris James	1,511	49.6	
Labour	Douglas Taylor	1,433	47.0	
Conservative	Shyamala Lennon	862	28.3	
Conservative	Ertan Hurer	783	25.7	
Liberal Democrats	Brendan Malone	407	13.4	
Liberal Democrats	Mutlu Beyzade	346	11.4	
Green	Basil Clarke	340	11.2	
Green	Nicholas Wall	322	10.6	
Freedom Alliance	Angela Lewis-Wright	47	1.5	
TUSC	Nicholas Haojipateras	44	1.4	
Turnout			43.1	
Labour hold		Swing		
Labour hold		Swing		

=== Ponders End ===
Ponders End (2)
Party	Candidate	Votes	%	±%
Labour	Nicki Adeleke	1,354	60.2	
Labour	Mohammad Islam	1,316	58.5	
Conservative	Md Uddin	647	28.7	
Conservative	Anupama Prasad	536	23.8	
Green	Andreea Malin	243	10.8	
Liberal Democrats	Robert Brassett	237	10.5	
Liberal Democrats	Brian Sekitto	169	7.5	
Turnout			31.6	
Labour hold		Swing		
Labour hold		Swing		

=== Ridgeway ===
Ridgeway (3)
Party	Candidate	Votes	%	±%
Conservative	Joanne Laban	2,541	60.7	
Conservative	Andrew Thorp	2,502	59.7	
Conservative	Edward Smith	2,427	57.9	
Labour	Simon Pearce	1,060	25.3	
Labour	Zeynep Aksanoglu	1,012	24.2	
Labour	Yalcin Aksanoglu	940	22.4	
Green	Hugh Small	682	16.3	
Liberal Democrats	Hilary Kidman	563	13.4	
Liberal Democrats	Alan Stainer	393	9.4	
Liberal Democrats	Lorice Stainer	357	8.5	
Reform	Jeff Evans	88	2.1	
Turnout			46.0	
Conservative win (new seat)				
Conservative win (new seat)				
Conservative win (new seat)				

=== Southbury ===
Southbury (3)
Party	Candidate	Votes	%	±%
Labour	Rick Jewell	1,714	50.3	
Labour	Mahmut Aksanoglu	1,705	50.0	
Labour	Ayten Guzel	1,692	49.6	
Conservative	Patrick Drysdale	1,225	35.9	
Conservative	Penelope Heathwood	1,214	35.6	
Conservative	Arben Neza	1,116	32.7	
Green	Sunaina Rishi	518	15.2	
Liberal Democrats	Alexander Rader	311	9.1	
Liberal Democrats	Stephen Viney	281	8.2	
Liberal Democrats	Mansoor Mir	259	7.6	
TUSC	John Dolan	126	3.7	
Freedom Alliance	Gwyneth Rolph	69	2.0	
Turnout			35.0	
Labour hold		Swing		
Labour hold		Swing		
Labour hold		Swing		

=== Southgate ===
Southgate (3)
Party	Candidate	Votes	%	±%
Conservative	Stephanos Ioannou	1,915	43.0	
Conservative	Chris Joannides	1,751	39.3	
Conservative	Elisa Morreale	1,654	37.1	
Labour	Christine Hamilton	1,365	30.6	
Labour	Harry Redmond	1,340	30.1	
Green	Charith Gunawardena	1,268	28.5	
Labour	Gary Ogin	1,183	26.6	
Green	Georgia Elliott-Smith	1,097	24.6	
Green	Nigel Watson	840	18.9	
Liberal Democrats	Richard Mapleston	342	7.7	
Liberal Democrats	Sanjay Mazumder	317	7.1	
Liberal Democrats	Diana Medlicott	293	6.6	
Turnout			44.5	
Conservative hold		Swing		
Conservative gain from Labour		Swing		
Conservative gain from Labour		Swing		

=== Town ===
Town (3)
Party	Candidate	Votes	%	±%
Conservative	Michael Rye	1,980	49.0	
Conservative	Emma Supple	1,963	48.5	
Conservative	James Steven	1,924	47.6	
Labour	Chris Cole	1,464	36.2	
Labour	Jacob Persaud	1,423	35.2	
Labour	Sibel Ozcelik	1,297	32.1	
Green	Kay Heather	842	20.8	
Liberal Democrats	Tim Martin	484	12.0	
Liberal Democrats	Ausilia Le'cand-Harwood	413	10.2	
Liberal Democrats	Christopher Le'cand-Harwood	342	8.5	
Turnout			44.4	
Conservative hold		Swing		
Conservative hold		Swing		
Conservative hold		Swing		

=== Upper Edmonton ===
Upper Edmonton (3)
Party	Candidate	Votes	%	±%
Labour	Margaret Greer	2,024	74.2	
Labour	Thomas Fawns	2,011	73.7	
Labour	Doris Jiagge	1,956	71.7	
Conservative	Daniel Pearce	512	18.8	
Conservative	Rachel Shawcross	435	15.9	
Conservative	Hifjur Rahman	431	15.8	
Green	David Flint	292	10.7	
Liberal Democrats	Tudorel Caracuda	202	7.4	
Liberal Democrats	Insaf El-Jaafari	160	5.9	
Liberal Democrats	Sahar Saami	160	5.9	
Turnout			30.6	
Labour hold		Swing		
Labour hold		Swing		
Labour hold		Swing		

=== Whitewebbs ===
Whitewebbs (3)
Party	Candidate	Votes	%	±%
Conservative	Hannah Dyson	1,900	44.1	
Conservative	David Skelton	1,788	41.5	
Conservative	Reece Fox	1,712	39.7	
Labour	David Wood	1,313	30.4	
Labour	Nishan Dzhingozyan	1,256	29.1	
Labour	Hass Yusuf	1,186	27.5	
Liberal Democrats	Gaetano Russo	1,057	24.5	
Liberal Democrats	Robert Wilson	1,042	24.2	
Liberal Democrats	Ayfer Orhan	971	22.5	
Green	Stephen Hennessy	558	12.9	
Reform	Deborah Cairns	85	2.0	
TUSC	Mirjana Glavardanov	70	1.6	
Turnout			45.6	
Conservative win (new seat)				
Conservative win (new seat)				
Conservative win (new seat)				

=== Winchmore Hill ===
Winchmore Hill (2)
Party	Candidate	Votes	%	±%
Conservative	Maria Alexandrou	1,899	54.7	
Conservative	Lee Chamberlain	1,725	49.7	
Labour	Carl Bayliss	996	28.7	
Labour	Mark Quinn	948	27.3	
Liberal Democrats	Matt McLaren	483	13.9	
Green	Jonathan Molloy	470	13.5	
Liberal Democrats	Andy Stainton	420	12.1	
Turnout			47.8	
Conservative hold		Swing		
Conservative gain from Labour		Swing		

== Changes 2022-2026 ==
=== Affiliation changes ===
- Thomas Fawns, elected for Labour, was suspended from the party in June 2024 and so became an independent.

=== By-elections ===
==== Bullsmoor ====
The by-election was triggered by the resignation of Labour councillor Esin Gunes.

Bullsmoor by-election: 20 April 2023
Party	Candidate	Votes	%	±%
Labour	Destiny Karakus	1,056	55.8	
Conservative	Christine Ann Bellas	686	36.2	
Green	Isobel Whittaker	81	4.3	
Liberal Democrats	Tim Martin	50	2.6	
TUSC	John Dolan	20	1.1	
Turnout		1,902	25.8	
Rejected ballots		9		
Labour hold		Swing		

==== Jubilee ====
Jubilee by-election: 28 November 2024
Party	Candidate	Votes	%	±%
Labour	Ian Barnes	853	39.4	–13.9
Conservative	Masud Uddin	691	31.9	+8.6
Independent	Khalid Sadur	208	9.6	N/A
Green	Katie Knight	169	7.8	–2.4
Reform	Neville Watson	149	6.9	N/A
Liberal Democrats	Tim Martin	94	4.3	–1.9
Majority		162	7.5	N/A
Turnout		2,164	21.2	
Labour hold		Swing	▼11.3	
