= List of populated places in Malatya Province =

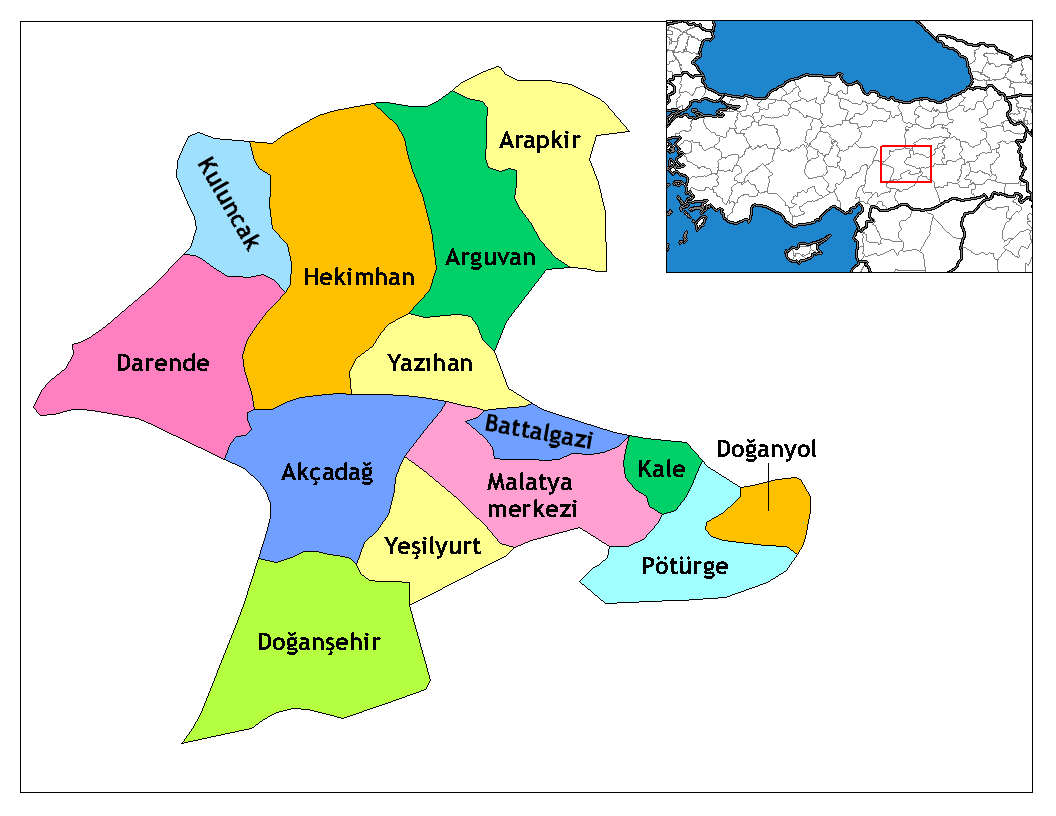
Malatya Province

Below is the list of populated places in Malatya Province, Turkey by the districts. In the following lists first place in each list is the administrative center of the district.

== Malatya ==
- Malatya
- Alhanuşağı, Malatya
- Bağtepe, Malatya
- Beydağı, Malatya
- Bindal, Malatya
- Bulgurlu, Malatya
- Bulutlu, Malatya
- Çamurlu, Malatya
- Çolaklı, Malatya
- Dilek, Malatya
- Duranlar, Malatya
- Duruldu, Malatya
- Düzyol, Malatya
- Erenli, Malatya
- Fatih, Malatya
- Fırıncı, Malatya
- Göktarla, Malatya
- Göller, Malatya
- Gülümuşağı, Malatya
- Hacıhaliloğluçiftliği, Malatya
- Hacıyusuflar, Malatya
- Hanımınçiftliği, Malatya
- Hisartepe, Malatya
- Kamıştaş, Malatya
- Kapıkaya, Malatya
- Karagöz, Malatya
- Karahan, Malatya
- Karakaşçiftliğiköyü, Malatya
- Karaköy, Malatya
- Karatepe, Malatya
- Kendirli, Malatya
- Kırkpınar, Malatya
- Mahmutlu, Malatya
- Merdivenler, Malatya
- Orduzu, Malatya
- Özal, Malatya
- Pelitli, Malatya
- Samanköy, Malatya
- Sevildağ, Malatya
- Suluköy, Malatya
- Sütlüce, Malatya
- Şahnahan, Malatya
- Tanışık, Malatya
- Tepeköy, Malatya
- Tohma, Malatya
- Tokluca, Malatya
- Topraktepe, Malatya
- Topsöğüt, Malatya
- Uluköy, Malatya
- Üzümlü, Malatya
- Yaygın, Malatya
- Yenice, Malatya
- Yeniköy, Malatya

== Akçadağ ==
- Akçadağ
- Aksaray, Akçadağ
- Aksüt, Akçadağ
- Aliçeri, Akçadağ
- Altunlu, Akçadağ
- Aşağıörükçü, Akçadağ
- Aydınlar, Akçadağ
- Bağköy, Akçadağ
- Bahri, Akçadağ
- Bayramuşağı, Akçadağ
- Bekiruşağı, Akçadağ
- Bölüklü, Akçadağ
- Büyükçimiş, Akçadağ
- Büyükköy, Akçadağ
- Çakıllıpınar, Akçadağ
- Çatalbahçe, Akçadağ
- Çevirme, Akçadağ
- Çobanuşağı, Akçadağ
- Darıca, Akçadağ
- Dedeköy, Akçadağ
- Demirciler, Akçadağ
- Derinboğaz, Akçadağ
- Develi, Akçadağ
- Doğanlar, Akçadağ
- Doğantepe, Akçadağ
- Durulova, Akçadağ
- Dutlu, Akçadağ
- Dümüklü, Akçadağ
- Esenbey, Akçadağ
- Esenli, Akçadağ
- Fatih, Akçadağ
- Gölpınar, Akçadağ
- Güneşli, Akçadağ
- Gürkaynak, Akçadağ
- Güzyurdu, Akçadağ
- Hançerli, Akçadağ
- Harunuşağı, Akçadağ
- Ilıcak, Akçadağ
- İkinciler, Akçadağ
- Kadıibrahim, Akçadağ
- Kahyalı, Akçadağ
- Karamağara, Akçadağ
- Karapınar, Akçadağ
- Kasımuşağı, Akçadağ
- Kayadibi, Akçadağ
- Keklikpınarı, Akçadağ
- Keller, Akçadağ
- Kolköy, Akçadağ
- Kozalak, Akçadağ
- Kozluca, Akçadağ
- Kömekavak, Akçadağ
- Kurtuşağı, Akçadağ
- Küçükkürne, Akçadağ
- Levent, Akçadağ
- Mezra, Akçadağ
- Mihmanlı, Akçadağ
- Muratlı, Akçadağ
- Ortaköy, Akçadağ
- Ören, Akçadağ
- Resuluşağı, Akçadağ
- Sahilköy, Akçadağ
- Sakalıuzun, Akçadağ
- Sarıhacı, Akçadağ
- Şeyhler, Akçadağ
- Taşevler, Akçadağ
- Taşolar, Akçadağ
- Tataruşağı, Akçadağ
- Yağmurlu, Akçadağ
- Yalınbudak, Akçadağ
- Yalınkaya, Akçadağ
- Yaylımlı, Akçadağ
- Yukarıörükçü, Akçadağ

== Arapgir ==
- Arapgir
- Aktaş, Arapgir
- Alıçlı, Arapgir
- Boğazlı, Arapgir
- Bostancık, Arapgir
- Budak, Arapgir
- Çakırsu, Arapgir
- Çaybaşı, Arapgir
- Çiğnir, Arapgir
- Çimen, Arapgir
- Deregezen, Arapgir
- Düzce, Arapgir
- Eğnir, Arapgir
- Esikli, Arapgir
- Eskiarapgir, Arapgir
- Gebeli, Arapgir
- Gözeli, Arapgir
- Günyüzü, Arapgir
- Kayakesen, Arapgir
- Kaynak, Arapgir
- Kazanç, Arapgir
- Kılıçlı, Arapgir
- Konducak, Arapgir
- Koru, Arapgir
- Meşeli, Arapgir
- Onar, Arapgir
- Ormansırtı, Arapgir
- Pacalı, Arapgir
- Pirali, Arapgir
- Selamlı, Arapgir
- Sinikli, Arapgir
- Sipahiuşağı, Arapgir
- Suceyin, Arapgir
- Sugeçti, Arapgir
- Şağıluşağı, Arapgir
- Tarhan, Arapgir
- Taşdelen, Arapgir
- Taşdibek, Arapgir
- Ulaçlı, Arapgir
- Yaylacık, Arapgir
- Yazılı, Arapgir
- Yeşilyayla, Arapgir
- Yukarıyabanlı, Arapgir

== Arguvan ==
- Arguvan
- Akören, Arguvan
- Alhasuşağı, Arguvan
- Armutlu, Arguvan
- Asar, Arguvan
- Asmaca, Arguvan
- Aşağısülmenli, Arguvan
- Bahçeli, Arguvan
- Bozan, Arguvan
- Bozburun, Arguvan
- Çakmak, Arguvan
- Çavuşköy, Arguvan
- Çayırlı, Arguvan
- Çevreli, Arguvan
- Çiftlik, Arguvan
- Çobandere, Arguvan
- Doydum, Arguvan
- Ermişli, Arguvan
- Eymir, Arguvan
- Göçeruşağı, Arguvan
- Gökağaç, Arguvan
- Gümüşlü, Arguvan
- Güngören, Arguvan
- Güveçli, Arguvan
- Hakverdi, Arguvan
- İçmece, Arguvan
- İsaköy, Arguvan
- Karababa, Arguvan
- Karahüyük, Arguvan
- Kışla, Arguvan
- Kızık, Arguvan
- Koçak, Arguvan
- Konakbaşı, Arguvan
- Koyuncu, Arguvan
- Kömürlük, Arguvan
- Kuruttaş, Arguvan
- Kuyudere, Arguvan
- Morhamam, Arguvan
- Tarlacık, Arguvan
- Tatkınık, Arguvan
- Yamaç, Arguvan
- Yazıbaşı, Arguvan
- Yeniköy, Arguvan
- Yenisu, Arguvan
- Yoncalı, Arguvan
- Yukarısülmenli, Arguvan
- Yürektaşı, Arguvan

== Battalgazi ==
- Battalgazi
- Adagören, Battalgazi
- Ağılyazı, Battalgazi
- Alişar, Battalgazi
- Boran, Battalgazi
- Çolakoğlu, Battalgazi
- Hasırcılar, Battalgazi
- Hatunsuyu, Battalgazi
- Kadıçayırı, Battalgazi
- Kemerköprü, Battalgazi
- Kuluşağı, Battalgazi
- Meydancık, Battalgazi
- Şişman, Battalgazi
- Toygar, Battalgazi
- Yarımcahan, Battalgazi

== Darende ==
- Darende
- Ağılbaşı, Darende
- Ağılyazı, Darende
- Akbaba, Darende
- Akçatoprak, Darende
- Akova, Darende
- Aşağıulupınar, Darende
- Ayvalı, Darende
- Balaban, Darende
- Barındır, Darende
- Başdirek, Darende
- Başkaya, Darende
- Çaybaşı, Darende
- Çınarköy, Darende
- Çukurkaya, Darende
- Gaziköy, Darende
- Gökçeören, Darende
- Göllüce, Darende
- Güdül, Darende
- Günerli, Darende
- Günpınar, Darende
- Hacolar, Darende
- Hisarcık, Darende
- Hisarkale, Darende
- Ilıca, Darende
- Irmaklı, Darende
- Karabacak, Darende
- Karabayır, Darende
- Karaoğuz, Darende
- Karşıyaka, Darende
- Kavakköy, Darende
- Kaynak, Darende
- Kerimli, Darende
- Körükler, Darende
- Kurudere, Darende
- Kuzpınar, Darende
- Mollauşağı, Darende
- Nurkuyusu, Darende
- Ozan, Darende
- Sakarya, Darende
- Şendere, Darende
- Şuğul, Darende
- Uzunhasan, Darende
- Üçpınar, Darende
- Yarımca, Darende
- Yavuzlar, Darende
- Yazıköy, Darende
- Yenice, Darende
- Yeniköy, Darende
- Yenipınar, Darende
- Yeşiltaş, Darende
- Yukarıulupınar, Darende

== Doğanşehir ==
- Doğanşehir
- Altıntop, Doğanşehir
- Beğre, Doğanşehir
- Çavuşlu, Doğanşehir
- Çığlık, Doğanşehir
- Çömlekoba, Doğanşehir
- Dedeyazı, Doğanşehir
- Erkenek, Doğanşehir
- Eskiköy, Doğanşehir
- Fındık, Doğanşehir
- Gövdeli, Doğanşehir
- Günedoğru, Doğanşehir
- Gürobası, Doğanşehir
- Güzelköy, Doğanşehir
- Hudut, Doğanşehir
- Kadılı, Doğanşehir
- Kapıdere, Doğanşehir
- Karanlıkdere, Doğanşehir
- Karaterzi, Doğanşehir
- Kelhalil, Doğanşehir
- Kurucaova, Doğanşehir
- Küçüklü, Doğanşehir
- Örencik, Doğanşehir
- Polat, Doğanşehir
- Polatdere, Doğanşehir
- Reşadiye, Doğanşehir
- Savaklı, Doğanşehir
- Söğüt, Doğanşehir
- Suçatı, Doğanşehir
- Sürgü, Doğanşehir
- Şatıroba, Doğanşehir
- Topraktepe, Doğanşehir
- Yolkoru, Doğanşehir
- Yuvalı, Doğanşehir

== Doğanyol ==
- Doğanyol
- Akkent, Doğanyol
- Behramlı, Doğanyol
- Burçköy, Doğanyol
- Damlı, Doğanyol
- Gevheruşağı, Doğanyol
- Gökçe, Doğanyol
- Gümüşsu, Doğanyol
- Koldere, Doğanyol
- Konurtay, Doğanyol
- Mezraa, Doğanyol
- Poyraz, Doğanyol
- Ulutaş, Doğanyol
- Yalınca, Doğanyol
- Yeşilköy, Doğanyol

== Hekimhan ==
- Hekimhan
- Akmağara, Hekimhan
- Aksütlü, Hekimhan
- Aşağısazlıca, Hekimhan
- Bahçedamı, Hekimhan
- Ballıkaya, Hekimhan
- Basak, Hekimhan
- Başkavak, Hekimhan
- Başkınık, Hekimhan
- Beykent, Hekimhan
- Boğazgören, Hekimhan
- Çanakpınar, Hekimhan
- Çimenlik, Hekimhan
- Çulhalı, Hekimhan
- Davulgu, Hekimhan
- Delihasanyurdu, Hekimhan
- Dereköy, Hekimhan
- Deveci, Hekimhan
- Dikenli, Hekimhan
- Dikili, Hekimhan
- Dumlu, Hekimhan
- Dursunlu, Hekimhan
- Girmana, Hekimhan
- Güvenç, Hekimhan
- Güzelyayla, Hekimhan
- Güzelyurt, Hekimhan
- Hacılar, Hekimhan
- Hasançelebi, Hekimhan
- Haydaroğlu, Hekimhan
- Işıklı, Hekimhan
- İğdir, Hekimhan
- Karaköçek, Hekimhan
- Karapınar, Hekimhan
- Karslılar, Hekimhan
- Kavacık, Hekimhan
- Kocaözü, Hekimhan
- Kozdere, Hekimhan
- Köylüköyü, Hekimhan
- Kurşunlu, Hekimhan
- Mollaibrahim, Hekimhan
- Salıcık, Hekimhan
- Saraylı, Hekimhan
- Sarıkız, Hekimhan
- Sazlıca, Hekimhan
- Söğüt, Hekimhan
- Taşoluk, Hekimhan
- Uğurlu, Hekimhan
- Yağca, Hekimhan
- Yayladam, Hekimhan
- Yeşilkale, Hekimhan
- Yeşilköy, Hekimhan
- Yeşilpınar, Hekimhan
- Yukarıselimli, Hekimhan

== Kale ==
- Kale, Malatya
- Akça, Kale
- Akuşağı, Kale
- Bentköy, Kale
- Çanakçı, Kale
- Darıpınar, Kale
- Erdemli, Kale
- Gülenköy, Kale
- İkizpınar, Kale
- Kaleköy, Kale
- Karaağaç, Kale
- Karahüseyin, Kale
- Kıyıcak, Kale
- Kozluk, Kale
- Salkımlı, Kale
- Sarıot, Kale
- Tepebaşı, Kale
- Uyanık, Kale
- Uzunhüseyin, Kale
- Yenidamlar, Kale

== Kuluncak ==
- Kuluncuk
- Alvar, Kuluncak
- Aşağıselimli, Kuluncak
- Başören, Kuluncak
- Bıyıkboğazı, Kuluncak
- Bicir, Kuluncak
- Ciritbelen, Kuluncak
- Çayköy, Kuluncak
- Darılı, Kuluncak
- Göğebakan, Kuluncak
- İlisuluk, Kuluncak
- Karabük, Kuluncak
- Karaçayır, Kuluncak
- Karıncalık, Kuluncak
- Karlık, Kuluncak
- Kaynarca, Kuluncak
- Kızılhisar, Kuluncak
- Kızılmağara, Kuluncak
- Konaktepe, Kuluncak
- Kömüklü, Kuluncak
- Sofular, Kuluncak
- Sultanlı, Kuluncak
- Temüklü, Kuluncak

== Pötürge ==
- Pötürge
- Aktarla, Pötürge
- Aliçeri, Pötürge
- Alihan, Pötürge
- Arınlı, Pötürge
- Arıtoprak, Pötürge
- Arslankent, Pötürge
- Bakımlı, Pötürge
- Balpınarı, Pötürge
- Başmezra, Pötürge
- Bayırköy, Pötürge
- Belenköy, Pötürge
- Bölükkaya, Pötürge
- Bölünmez, Pötürge
- Büyüköz, Pötürge
- Çamlıdere, Pötürge
- Çayköy, Pötürge
- Çengelli, Pötürge
- Çığırlı, Pötürge
- Çukuroymağı, Pötürge
- Deredüzü, Pötürge
- Düvenlik, Pötürge
- Erdemler, Pötürge
- Esencik, Pötürge
- Esenlik, Pötürge
- Gökçeli, Pötürge
- Gözlüce, Pötürge
- Gündeğer, Pötürge
- Gündüz, Pötürge
- Karakaya, Pötürge
- Karşıyaka, Pötürge
- Kavaklıdere, Pötürge
- Kayadere, Pötürge
- Koçköy, Pötürge
- Korucak, Pötürge
- Kozluk, Pötürge
- Köklükaya, Pötürge
- Kökpınar, Pötürge
- Körme, Pötürge
- Meşedibi, Pötürge
- Nohutlu, Pötürge
- Ormaniçi, Pötürge
- Örencik, Pötürge
- Örmeli, Pötürge
- Örnekköy, Pötürge
- Pazarcık, Pötürge
- Sahilköy, Pötürge
- Sorguçlu, Pötürge
- Söğütlü, Pötürge
- Taşmış, Pötürge
- Taştepe, Pötürge
- Tatlıcak, Pötürge
- Tekederesi, Pötürge
- Teluşağı, Pötürge
- Tepehan, Pötürge
- Tosunlu, Pötürge
- Ulutaş, Pötürge
- Uzunkoru, Pötürge
- Uzuntaş, Pötürge
- Üçyaka, Pötürge
- Yamaç, Pötürge
- Yandere, Pötürge
- Yazıca, Pötürge
- Yediyol, Pötürge
- Yeşildere, Pötürge

== Yazıhan ==
- Yazıhan
- Akyazı, Yazıhan
- Alican, Yazıhan
- Ambarcık, Yazıhan
- Bahçelievler, Yazıhan
- Balaban, Yazıhan
- Bereketli, Yazıhan
- Boyaca, Yazıhan
- Boztepe, Yazıhan
- Böğürtlen, Yazıhan
- Buzluk, Yazıhan
- Çavuş, Yazıhan
- Çivril, Yazıhan
- Dedekargın, Yazıhan
- Durucasu, Yazıhan
- Eğribük, Yazıhan
- Epreme, Yazıhan
- Erecek, Yazıhan
- Fethiye, Yazıhan
- Gövük, Yazıhan
- Hamidiye, Yazıhan
- İriağaç, Yazıhan
- Karaca, Yazıhan
- Koşar, Yazıhan
- Kömüşhan, Yazıhan
- Mısırdere, Yazıhan
- Sadıklı, Yazıhan
- Sinanlı, Yazıhan
- Sürür, Yazıhan
- Tahtalı, Yazıhan
- Tecirli, Yazıhan

== Yeşilyurt ==
- Yeşilyurt
- Aşağıköy, Yeşilyurt
- Atalar, Yeşilyurt
- Bostanbaşı, Yeşilyurt
- Cumhuriyet, Yeşilyurt
- Çayırköy, Yeşilyurt
- Görgü, Yeşilyurt
- Gözene, Yeşilyurt
- Gündüzbey, Yeşilyurt
- Işıklı, Yeşilyurt
- İkizce, Yeşilyurt
- Kadiruşağı, Yeşilyurt
- Kırlangıç, Yeşilyurt
- Kozluk, Yeşilyurt
- Kuşdoğan, Yeşilyurt
- Kuyulu, Yeşilyurt
- Oluklu, Yeşilyurt
- Ortaköy, Yeşilyurt
- Öncü, Yeşilyurt
- Salkonak, Yeşilyurt
- Seyituşağı, Yeşilyurt
- Üçgöze, Yeşilyurt
- Yakınca, Yeşilyurt
- Yalınkaya, Yeşilyurt

== Recent development ==
According to Law act no 6360, all Turkish provinces with a population more than 750 000, were renamed as metropolitan municipality. All districts in those provinces became second level municipalities and all villages in those districts were renamed as a neighborhoods . Thus the villages listed above are officially neighborhoods of Malatya.
