= Hacı Garip Ağa =

Turkish politician

- Born: Hacı Garip Ağa; 1871; Hekimhan, Ottoman Empire
- Died: 27 July 1925 (aged 53–54); Hekimhan, Turkey
- Occupation: Turkish politician

Hacı Garip Ağa (1871–1925) was the Lord of Hekimhan under Ottoman rule.

== Career ==
He was engaged in trade as well as raising and maintaining an army for the Empire's various military campaigns. Hacı Garip Ağa campaigned against Russia during World War I and ensured that Russian troops did not access strategic ammunition and weapons stockpiles and maintained Turkish trenches to stop Russian troops from advancing into Turkish territory.

Hacı Garip Ağa was among the first set of representatives who joined the parliament for its first session on April 23, 1920, the day when the Turkish Republic was formed. Hacı Garip Ağa represented Malatya in Parliament and removed his royal titles once democracy was established. He transferred his position as Lord to the elected Mayor of Hekimhan and distributed his lands to the villagers working the land.

He temporarily left the parliament in order to suppress the rebellion in Yozgat which wanted to re-form an Ottoman style government in Turkey. After the rebellion was suppressed and his military duties were over on 27 September 1920, he returned to his home in Hekimhan and was excused from parliamentary duties until February 1921.

He spent the following years as a member of parliament but did not actively participate in parliamentary sessions or take political roles in any commissions.

When he left parliament, he returned home to Hekimhan. On July 27, 1925, he died. It is said that on his deathbed when a guest arrived for a visit Hacı Garip Ağa quickly got up got dressed and greeted his guest.

== Personal life ==
He had 6 children. His eldest son, Ahmet Turan who was called "Garip ağa'nin oğlu" (Son of Garip Ağa) adopted the last name of Garipağaoğlu (Garipağaoğlu - Garip Ağa's Son). His lineage uses the last names of "Garipağaoğlu", "Garibağaoğlu" and "Taner". Taner was awarded the "Medallion of Independence" for his service during the wars.

During parliamentary sessions, while discussing the question of: "What does democracy and independence depend on in order to create prosperity for the nation?", Taner's response was recorded in the archives as:

[National prosperity depends on] "Knowledge and educating the villagers"
