= Orduzu, Battalgazi =

Village in Turkey

Orduzu
- Neighbourhood
- Location in Turkey
- Coordinates: 38.373°N 38.364°E
- Country: Turkey
- Province: Malatya
- District: Battalgazi
- Population (2025): 22,179
- Time zone: UTC+3 (TRT)

Orduzu, also known as Bahçebaşı, is a neighbourhood in the municipality and district of Battalgazi, Malatya Province in Turkey. It is populated by Kurds of the Reşwan tribe and by Turks had a population of 22,179 in 2025.
