= Çamurlu, Battalgazi =

Village in Turkey

Çamurlu
- Neighbourhood
- Location in Turkey
- Coordinates: 38.334°N 38.415°E
- Country: Turkey
- Province: Malatya
- District: Battalgazi
- Population (2025): 6,536
- Time zone: UTC+3 (TRT)

Çamurlu (Kurdish: Çamê) is a neighbourhood in the municipality and district of Battalgazi, Malatya Province in Turkey. It is populated by Kurds of the Reşwan tribe had a population of 6,536 in 2025.
