= Bıcır, Kuluncak =

Village in Turkey

Bıcır
- Neighbourhood
- Location in Turkey
- Coordinates: 38.922°N 37.573°E
- Country: Turkey
- Province: Malatya
- District: Kuluncak
- Population (2025): 299
- Time zone: UTC+3 (TRT)

Bıcır or Bicir, is a neighbourhood in the municipality and district of Kuluncak, Malatya Province in Turkey. It is populated by Turks had a population of 299 in 2025.
