= Şotik, Arguvan =

Village in Turkey

Şotik
- Neighbourhood
- Location in Turkey
- Coordinates: 38.987°N 38.221°E
- Country: Turkey
- Province: Malatya
- District: Arguvan
- Population (2025): 222
- Time zone: UTC+3 (TRT)

Şotik, formerly Çobandede, is a neighbourhood in the municipality and district of Arguvan, Malatya Province in Turkey. It is populated by Kurds of the Atma tribe and had a population of 222 in 2025.

== Notable people ==
- Kemal Bülbül
