= İlyas Salman =

Turkish actor,screenwriter, director, musician

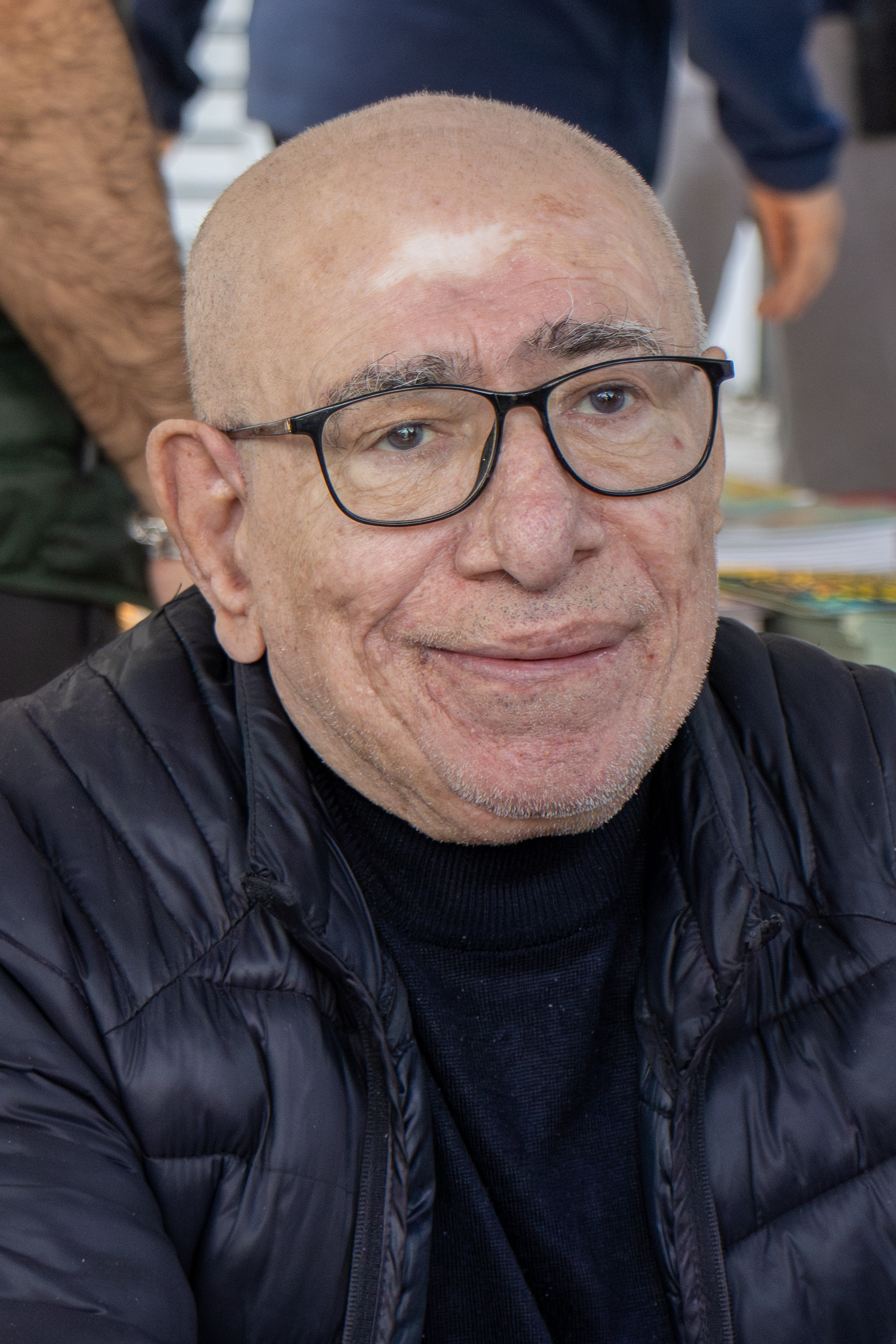
- Born: 14 January 1949 (age 77); Arguvan, Malatya, Turkey
- Education: Ankara State Conservatory
- Occupations: Actor, director, author, musician
- Years active: 1977–present
- Spouse: Gülser Salman
- Children: 2
- Awards: 2012 Best Actor-Golden Boll Award

İlyas Salman (born 14 January 1949) is a Turkish actor, film director, author, screenwriter and musician.

He shared the Adana Golden Boll International Film Festival's Best Actor Award in 2012 together with Engin Günaydın.

== Personal life ==
Salman was born on 14 January 1949 in Arguvan, Malatya. His family originate from the Asar neighborhood in Arguvan. He was accepted as a Kurd because of the Kurdish typologies he had played for many years. In 2007, in an article written by himself and later in a book he revealed that he was an Alevi Turkmen.

He is a supporter of the left-wing. He participated at Communist Party of Turkey's rally in Kartal on 1 May 2006. He is one of the contributors to Turkish Left magazine.

== Karanfil Kokuyor Cıgaram ==
As of 1 October 2009, he wanted to start performing a show called "Karanfil Kokuyor Cıgaram" where he would read the poems from the book "Hasretinden Prangalar Eskittim" by Ahmed Arif in Bakırköy Art Center. The visual director of the show would be his son Temmuz Salman. His daughter Devrim Salman would be the soloist on the show. However, due to some temporary health problems of İlyas Salman, the program was postponed for a while.

== Filmography ==
=== Actor ===
==== Films ====
Year	Original title	Alt. English translation	Role	Notes
1977	Çöpçüler Kralı	King of Waste Collectors	The Housekeeper	
1977	Baskın	The Raid		
1978	Kibar Feyzo	Feyzo the Gentle	Bilo	
1978	Sultan	Sultan	Bekçi Kolombo ( Kolombo the Security Guard)	
1978	Hababam Sınıfı Dokuz Doğuruyor		Bilo Ağa (Bilo the Agha)	
1979	Erkek Güzeli Sefil Bilo	Bilo the Miserable Beauty King	Bilo	
1980	Talihli Amele	The Lucky Worker	Mehmet Ali	
1980	Banker Bilo	Bilo the Banker	Bilo	
1980	İbişo	İbişo	İbişo	
1980	Beş Parasız Adam	The Broke Man		
1981	Hababam Sınıfı Güle Güle	Hababam Grade Good Bye	Mehmet Hoca (Mehmet the Teacher)	
1981	Çirkinler de Sever	The Ugly Ones May Love	Mazlum	
1982	Dolap Beygiri	The Wheel Horse	Ali	
1982	Çiçek Abbas	Abbas in Flower	Çiçek Abbas	
1983	Aptal Kahraman	The Dumb Hero	Şahan	
1983	Şaşkın Ördek	Silly Duck	Halil İbrahim	
1983	Şekerpare	Sweetheart	Cumali	
1984	Kızlar Sınıfı	Class of Girls	İlyas Hoca	
1985	Ya Ya Ya Şa Şa Şa	Hurray Hurray		
1985	Uyanıklar Dünyası	World of Shifties	İlyas	
1985	Ekmek Elden Su Gölden			
1985	Para Babası	Tycoon Business		
1985	Fakir Milyoner	The Poor Millionaire		
1985	Sarı Öküz Parası	Money for The Yellow Ox		
1985	The Sandwich Holding			
1985	Deliye Hergün Bayram	Everyday (is a) Feast for the Dementeds		
1986	Sen Neymişsin Be Abi			
1986	Karaman'ın Koyunu	Karaman Type Sheep		
1986	Ben Milyoner Değilim	I'm Not A Millionaire		
1986	Ava Giden Avlanır	The Bitter Bit		
1987	Aşk Peşinde	Chasing the Love	İlyas	
1987	Gönlü Bol	Generous Hearted		
1988	Keklik Ali	Ali the Partrdge	Ali	
1988	Aptal Aşık	Stupid Lover		
1989	Afacan	The Impish		
1989	Kınalı Hanzo		İlyas	
1990	Aile Bağları	Family Ties	Deli Fişek (The Crazy Crack)	Also director
1990	Zavallı	The Miserable	Ali	Also director
1992	Sarı Mercedes	Yellow Mercedes	Bayram the Expatriate	
1994	Sarhoş	Drunken		
1994	Talihsiz Bilo	Bilo the Unlucky	İlyas/Talat	
1994	Yoksa Yaşlandım Mı?	Did I Get Older?		
1995	Naylon Karı	Nylon Dame		
1995	Antika Kabadayı	Hidebound Bully	Deli Eşref (Eşref the Crazy)	
1995	Karımı Aldatamam	I Can't Cheat on My Wife	Recai	
1995	Tek Ayaklı Kuşlar	One Legged Birds	Lokman	
1995	Rambo Ramiz	Ramiz the Rambo	Rambo Ramiz	
1997	Tatil Belası	The Vacancy Trouble	Dr. Mustafa Özsoy	
2000	Şam Fıstık	Pistacchio		
2003	Çığlığın Dağlarda Yükselir	Your Scream Would Raise on the Mountains		
2003	Sen Hiç Güneşte Üşüdün Mü?	Have You Ever Get Cold Under the Sun?		
2003	Güneş De Karanlığa Düşer	Sun Falls in Dark, Too		
2006	Sis ve Gece	Fog and Night	Cuma	
2006	Adressiz Sorgular	Unaddressed Queries		
2008	Sevgili Babam	Dear Father		
2008	Şeytanın Pabucu		Halil	
2009	Çıngıraklı Top	Rattled Ball	Muzo	
2014	სიმინდის კუნძული / Simindis Kundzuli	Corn Island	Old man	

==== TV shows ====
Year	Original title	Alt. English translation	Role	Notes
1980	Yedi Kocalı Hürmüz	Hürmüz with Seven Husbands	Bıçkın Rüstem (Rüstem the Roughneck)	
1994	Kızlar Sınıfı	Class of Girls		
1997	Yasemince		Credited Special Guest	
1998	Gülerken Ağladık	We Cried When We Were Laughing	Mehmet Yabancı	
2001	Fakiro			
2008	Ölüm Çiçekleri – Saraybosna	Flowers of Death – Sarajevo	Eyüp Sabri	
2010	Akasya Durağı	Akasya Station	Maho Ağa (Maho Agha)	

=== Director and screenwriter ===
Year	Original title	Alt. English translation	Role	Notes
1990	Zavallı	Miserable	Ali	Also acted
1990	Aile Bağları	Family Ties	Deli Fişek (The Crazy Crack)	Also acted

Awards
Preceded by Durukan Ordu	Golden Boll Award for Best Actor; 2012 with Engin Günaydın for Yeraltı	Succeeded by incumbent
