= Orduzu Sports Complex =

Multi-sport venue in Malatya, Turkey

Orduzu Sports Complex Orduzu Spor Kompleksi
- Interactive map of Orduzu Sports Complex; Orduzu Spor Kompleksi
- Location: Battalgazi, Malatya, Turkey
- Coordinates: 38.46232°N 38.39769°E
- Owner: Malatya Metropolitan Municipality

Construction
- Groundbreaking: 2021
- Opened: 2023; 3 years ago

Orduzu Sports Complex (Turkish: Orduzu Spor Kompleksi) is a multi-sport venue in Malatya, Turkey. It was opened in 2023.

== Location ==
Orduzu Sports Complex is located on Turgut Özal Cad. 30/1 at Orduzu neighborhood in Battalgazi district of Malatya Province, eastern Turkey. ,

== Overview ==
Projected and built by the Malatya Metropolitan Municipality in cooperation with the Ministry of Youth and Sports, the construction of the Orduzu Sports Complex started in 2021. Stretching over 130,000 m^{2} (32 acres) land, the total covered area of the buildings is 25,000 m^{2} (270,000 sq ft). It was completed in the fall of 2023.

The complex features a sports hall with 5,000 seating capacity for basketball and volleyball games, an artistic gymnastics hall for 500 spectators, training halls, football fields, basketball courts, tennis courts, and hosts an Olympics Preparation Center (TOHM). In addition, it has a cafeteria, a 16-room accommodation center and car parking lot.

== International events hosted ==
13 August 2025 - 2026 Men's European Volleyball Championship qualification - Pool A match Turkey vs Denmark.
