= Hasançelebi mine =

Turkish iron mine

- Location within Turkey
- Location: Divriği, Sivas Province, Turkey; 38°57′15.98″N 37°53′34.01″E
- Products: Iron
- Opened: 1955
- Company: Etibank

The Hasançelebi mine is a large mine in the centre of Turkey in Hasançelebi, Malatya Province 579 km south of the capital, Ankara. Hasançelebi represents the largest iron reserve in Turkey having estimated reserves of 20 million tonnes of ore grading 54% iron. The 20 million tonnes of ore contains 10.8 million tonnes of iron metal.
