= Zurbahan =

Mountain in Hekimhan, Turkey

Coordinates: 38.8683°N 37.9433°E

Zurbahan is a mountain in the district of Hekimhan, Malatya Province, Turkey. It is located in Upper part of Euphrates in Eastern Anatolia. The altitude of it is 2,091 m (6,860 ft). It is noticeable from 100 km (62 mi) away in open sky. It has mineral resources and sweet water which waters apricot gardens on the slope of the mountain foot. According to the late Metin Kara, people of Hekimhan thinks that Zurbahan mountain has some kind of mystic powers. Therefore, it is well respected and beloved. It is the unofficial symbol of Hekimhan county. Further information and the picture of Zurbahan is given in this link
