= Kapıkaya, Battalgazi =

Village in Turkey

Kapıkaya
- Neighbourhood
- Location in Turkey
- Coordinates: 38.365°N 38.574°E
- Country: Turkey
- Province: Malatya
- District: Battalgazi
- Population (2025): 227
- Time zone: UTC+3 (TRT)

Kapıkaya is a neighbourhood in the municipality and district of Battalgazi, Malatya Province in Turkey. It is populated by Kurds of the Herdî tribe had a population of 227 in 2025.
