= Gürge, Arguvan =

Village in Turkey

Gürge
- Neighbourhood
- Location in Turkey
- Coordinates: 38.921°N 38.360°E
- Country: Turkey
- Province: Malatya
- District: Arguvan
- Population (2025): 191
- Time zone: UTC+3 (TRT)

Gürge, formerly Koyuncu, is a neighbourhood in the municipality and district of Arguvan, Malatya Province in Turkey. It is populated by Turks and had a population of 191 in 2025.
