= Narmikan, Arguvan =

Village in Turkey

Narmikan
- Neighbourhood
- Location in Turkey
- Coordinates: 38.773°N 38.407°E
- Country: Turkey
- Province: Malatya
- District: Arguvan
- Population (2025): 352
- Time zone: UTC+3 (TRT)

Narmikan, formerly Yazıbaşı, is a neighbourhood in the municipality and district of Arguvan, Malatya Province in Turkey. It is populated by Kurds of the Dirêjan tribe and had a population of 352 in 2025.
