= Şatırobası, Doğanşehir =

Village in Turkey

Şatırobası
- Neighbourhood
- Location in Turkey
- Coordinates: 38.102°N 37.944°E
- Country: Turkey
- Province: Malatya
- District: Doğanşehir
- Population (2025): 126
- Time zone: UTC+3 (TRT)

Şatırobası is a neighbourhood in the municipality and district of Doğanşehir, Malatya Province in Turkey. It is populated by Kurds of the Balan tribe and had a population of 126 in 2025.
