= Bulgurlu, Battalgazi =

Village in Turkey

Bulgurlu
- Neighbourhood
- Location in Turkey
- Coordinates: 38.357°N 38.448°E
- Country: Turkey
- Province: Malatya
- District: Battalgazi
- Population (2025): 14,648
- Time zone: UTC+3 (TRT)

Bulgurlu is a neighbourhood in the municipality and district of Battalgazi, Malatya Province in Turkey. It is populated by Kurds had a population of 14,648 in 2025.
