= Beydağı, Battalgazi =

Village in Turkey

Beydağı
- Neighbourhood
- Location in Turkey
- Coordinates: 38.291°N 38.476°E
- Country: Turkey
- Province: Malatya
- District: Battalgazi
- Population (2025): 1,373
- Time zone: UTC+3 (TRT)

Beydağı (Kurdish: Beydaxê, Mamurek) is a neighbourhood in the municipality and district of Battalgazi, Malatya Province in Turkey. It is populated by Kurds of the Reşwan tribe had a population of 1,373 in 2025.
