= Hacıhaliloğluçiftliği, Battalgazi =

Village in Turkey

Hacıhaliloğluçiftliği
- Neighbourhood
- Location in Turkey
- Coordinates: 38.330°N 38.472°E
- Country: Turkey
- Province: Malatya
- District: Battalgazi
- Population (2025): 474
- Time zone: UTC+3 (TRT)

Hacıhaliloğluçiftliği is a neighbourhood in the municipality and district of Battalgazi, Malatya Province in Turkey. It is populated by Kurds had a population of 474 in 2025.
