= Parçikan, Arguvan =

Village in Turkey

Parçikan
- Neighbourhood
- Location in Turkey
- Coordinates: 38.641°N 38.266°E
- Country: Turkey
- Province: Malatya
- District: Arguvan
- Population (2025): 212
- Time zone: UTC+3 (TRT)

Parçikan, formerly Bozburun, is a neighbourhood in the municipality and district of Arguvan, Malatya Province in Turkey. It is populated by Kurds of the Parçikan tribe and had a population of 212 in 2025.
