= Kemal Bülbül =

Turkish teacher and politician

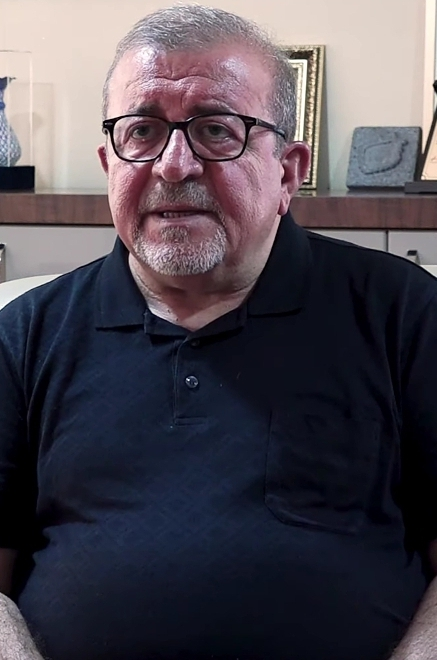
- Kemal Bülbül

Member of the Grand National Assembly
- Incumbent
- Assumed office November 2015
- Constituency: Antalya (2015)

Personal details
- Born: 1963 (age 62–63) Şotik, Arguvan, Turkey
- Children: 1
- Occupation: Politician

Kemal Bülbül (born 1963 in Arguvan) is a Turkish teacher, politician and member of the 27th Grand National Assembly of Turkey for HDP. Bülbül is Kurdish and Alevi.

== Biography ==
Bülbül was born in the village of Şotik in Arguvan of Malatya Province in Turkey.

He graduated from Trakya University and worked as a teacher in Kâhta, Ankara and Van. He founded the Confederation of Public Employees' Unions. He served as General President of the Pir Sultan Abdal Cultural Association and the General Secretary of the Alevi Bektashi Federation. He moreover served as the Ankara Provincial Head of HADEP.

In November 2020, he was sentenced to six years in prison for attending a meeting of Democratic Society Congress.
