= Kuluncak =

- District and municipality
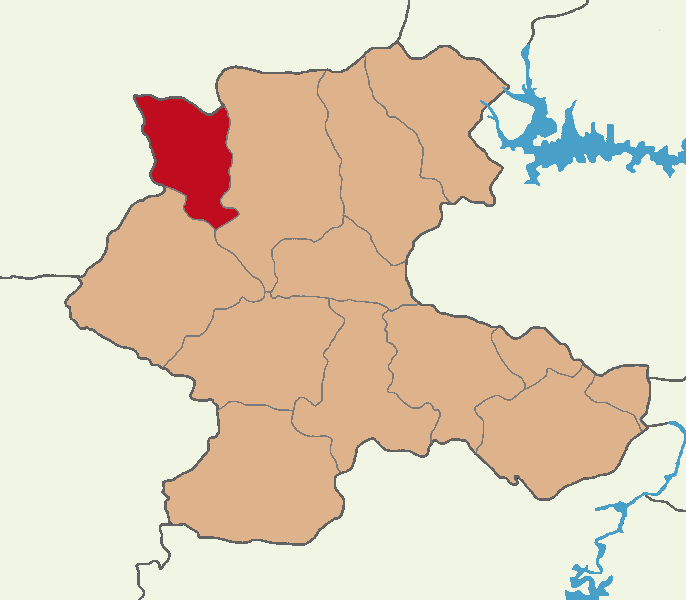
- Map showing Kuluncak District in Malatya Province

- Location within Turkey
- Coordinates: 38°53′09″N 37°40′13″E
- Country: Turkey
- Province: Malatya

Government
  - Mayor: Erhan Cengiz (MHP)
- Area: 645 km^{2} (249 sq mi)
- Elevation: 1,270 m (4,170 ft)
- Population (2022): 7,000
  - Density: 11/km^{2} (28/sq mi)
- Time zone: UTC+3 (TRT)
- Postal code: 44760
- Area code: 0422
- Website: www.kuluncak.bel.tr

Kuluncak (Kurdish: Tirsekan) is a municipality and district of Malatya Province, Turkey. Its area is 645 km^{2}, and its population is 7,000 (2022). The mayor is Erhan Cengiz (MHP).

== Composition ==
There are 28 neighbourhoods in Kuluncak District:

- Alvar
- Aşağıselimli
- Bahçelievler
- Başören
- Bıcır
- Bıyıkboğazı
- Boğaziçi
- Çayköy
- Ciritbelen
- Çörmü
- Göğebakan
- Ilısuluk
- İsmetpaşa
- İstiklal
- Karabük
- Karaçayır
- Karıncalık
- Karlık
- Kaynarca
- Kızılhisar
- Kızılmağara
- Kömüklü
- Konaktepe
- Ortapınar
- Sofular
- Sultanlı
- Temüklü
- Yeni
