= Budaklı, Hekimhan =

Village in Turkey

Budaklı
- Neighbourhood
- Location in Turkey
- Coordinates: 38.856°N 37.961°E
- Country: Turkey
- Province: Malatya
- District: Hekimhan
- Population (2025): 116
- Time zone: UTC+3 (TRT)

Budaklı is a neighbourhood in the municipality and district of Hekimhan, Malatya Province in Turkey. It is populated by Turks and had a population of 116 in 2025.
