= Hanımınçiftliği, Battalgazi =

Hanımınçiftliği
- Neighbourhood
- Location in Turkey
- Coordinates: 38.378°N 38.335°E
- Country: Turkey
- Province: Malatya
- District: Battalgazi
- Population (2025): 12,285
- Time zone: UTC+3 (TRT)

Hanımınçiftliği (Kurdish: Gundê Çifliga Xanimê) is a neighbourhood of the municipality and district of Battalgazi, Malatya Province, Turkey. Its population is 13,322 (2022). Before the 2013 reorganisation, it was a town (belde). Also in 2013, it passed from the former central district of Malatya Province to Battalgazi district.

It is populated by Kurds of the Reşwan tribe had a population of 12,285 in 2025.
