= Polatderesi, Doğanşehir =

Village in Turkey

Polatderesi
- Neighbourhood
- Location in Turkey
- Coordinates: 38.149°N 37.939°E
- Country: Turkey
- Province: Malatya
- District: Doğanşehir
- Population (2025): 314
- Time zone: UTC+3 (TRT)

Polatderesi, also known as Polatdere, is a neighbourhood in the municipality and district of Doğanşehir, Malatya Province in Turkey. It is populated by Kurds of the Balan tribe and had a population of 314 in 2025.
