= Akkent, Malatya =

Akkent
- Neighbourhood
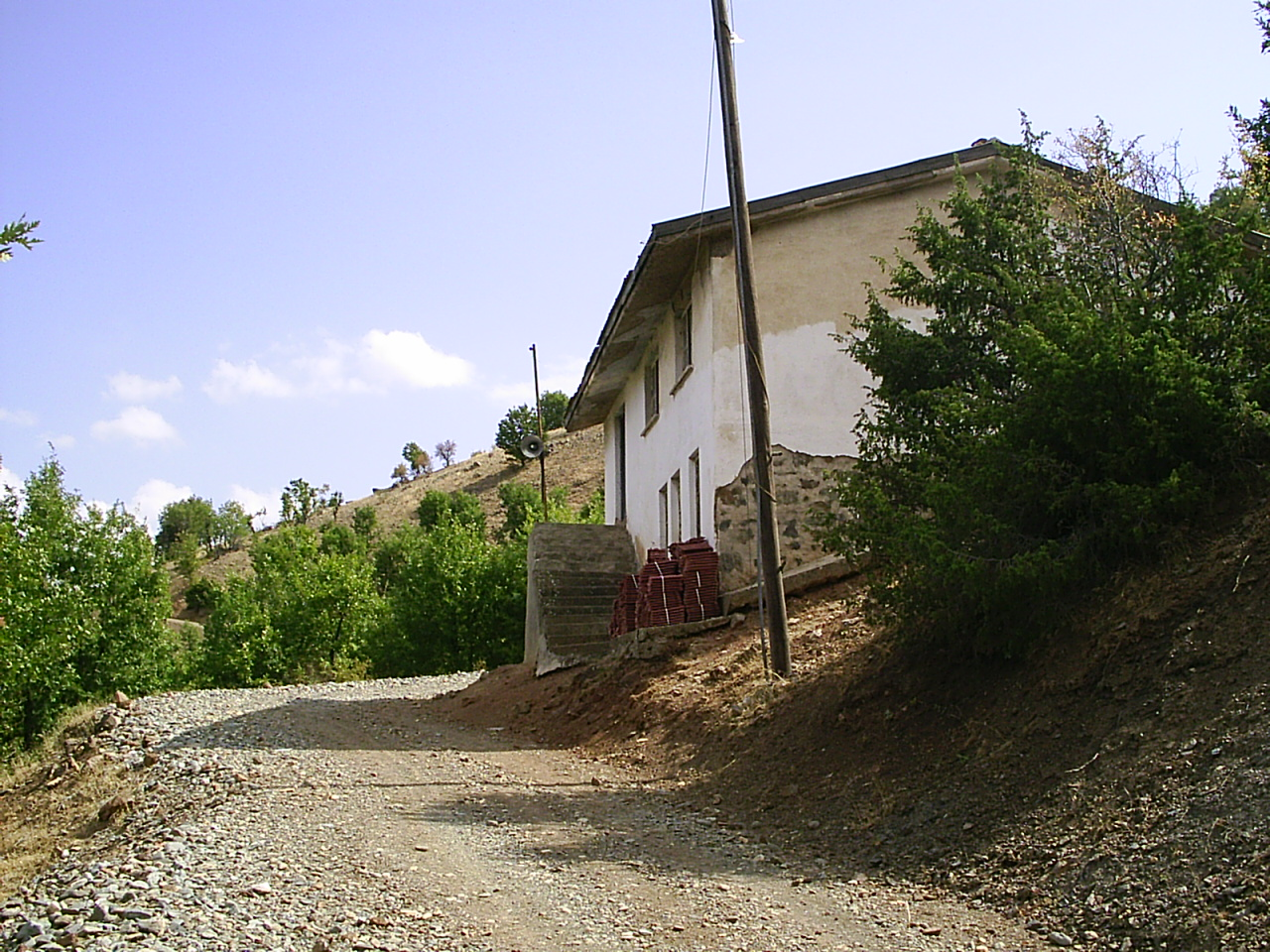
- Street in Akkent

- Location within Turkey
- Coordinates: 38°19′22″N 39°06′16″E
- Country: Turkey
- Province: Malatya
- District: Doğanyol
- Population (2022): 44
- Time zone: UTC+3 (TRT)

Akkent is a neighbourhood of the municipality and district of Doğanyol, Malatya Province, Turkey. Its population is 44 (2022). It lies on the Euphrates River.

On 24 January 2020 the village was impacted by a magnitude 6.7 earthquake.
