= Doğanşehir =

- District and municipality
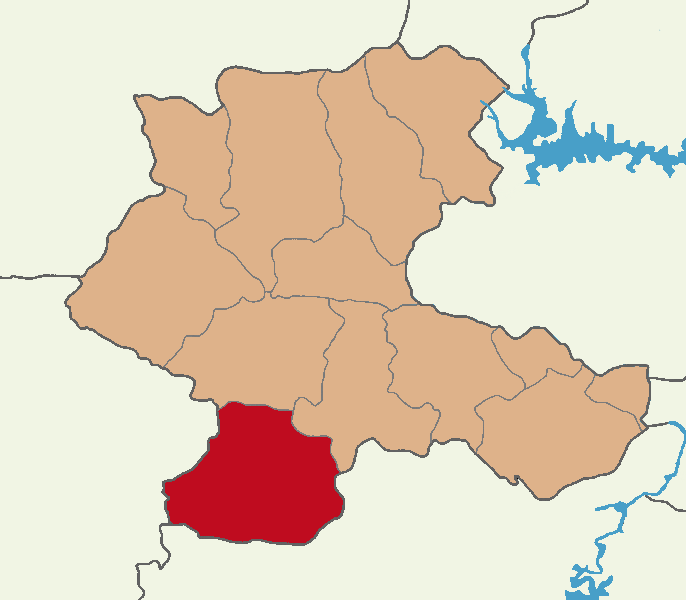
- Map showing Doğanşehir District in Malatya Province

- Location within Turkey
- Coordinates: 38°05′45″N 37°52′45″E
- Country: Turkey
- Province: Malatya

Government
  - Mayor: Memet Bayram (CHP)
- Area: 1,364 km^{2} (527 sq mi)
- Population (2022): 37,697
  - Density: 27.64/km^{2} (71.58/sq mi)
- Time zone: UTC+3 (TRT)
- Postal code: 44500
- Area code: 0422
- Website: www.dogansehir.bel.tr

Doğanşehir (Kurdish: Wêranşar/Mûhacîr, formerly known as Muhacir and Viranşehir) is a municipality and district of Malatya Province, Turkey. Its area is 1,364 km^{2} (526.6 sq mi), and its population is 37,697 (2022). The mayor is Memet Bayram (CHP). Historically the city was known as Sozopetra (Greek: Σωζόπετρα).

== Geography ==
The altitude of the town is 1,290 meters (4232 feet) above mean sea level. Both plains and mountains are part of the landscape. It borders Çelikhan District to the east, Adıyaman District to the southeast, Tut District to the south, Gölbaşı District to the southwest, Nurhak and Elbistan to the west, Akçadağ to the north and Yeşilyurt to the northeast. The reservoirs at Polat Dam and Sürgü Dam are situated in the district.

=== Climate ===
Doğanşehir has a dry-summer continental climate (Köppen: Dsa) with hot, dry summers, and cold, snowy winters.

Climate data for Doğanşehir (1991–2020)
Month	Jan	Feb	Mar	Apr	May	Jun	Jul	Aug	Sep	Oct	Nov	Dec	Year
Mean daily maximum °C (°F)	2.6 (36.7)	5.0 (41.0)	10.8 (51.4)	16.7 (62.1)	21.9 (71.4)	28.4 (83.1)	32.5 (90.5)	32.8 (91.0)	27.8 (82.0)	20.0 (68.0)	11.4 (52.5)	4.6 (40.3)	17.9 (64.2)
Daily mean °C (°F)	−1.6 (29.1)	0.0 (32.0)	5.3 (41.5)	10.5 (50.9)	14.8 (58.6)	20.3 (68.5)	23.7 (74.7)	23.3 (73.9)	18.3 (64.9)	12.1 (53.8)	5.2 (41.4)	0.2 (32.4)	11.1 (52.0)
Mean daily minimum °C (°F)	−5.7 (21.7)	−4.7 (23.5)	−0.1 (31.8)	4.0 (39.2)	7.2 (45.0)	10.9 (51.6)	13.6 (56.5)	13.3 (55.9)	9.0 (48.2)	5.0 (41.0)	−0.3 (31.5)	−3.7 (25.3)	4.1 (39.4)
Average precipitation mm (inches)	73.21 (2.88)	64.63 (2.54)	67.6 (2.66)	55.82 (2.20)	46.58 (1.83)	13.0 (0.51)	2.46 (0.10)	3.14 (0.12)	10.85 (0.43)	39.09 (1.54)	57.53 (2.26)	69.39 (2.73)	503.3 (19.81)
Average precipitation days (≥ 1.0 mm)	8.7	8.3	8.0	8.3	6.5	3.1	1.4	1.5	2.2	5.5	6.4	8.1	68.0
Source: NOAA

== Composition ==
There are 39 neighbourhoods in Doğanşehir District:

- Altıntop
- Beğre
- Bıçakcı
- Çavuşlu
- Çığlık
- Çömlekoba
- Dedeyazı
- Doğu
- Elmalı
- Erkenek
- Esentepe
- Eskiköy
- Fındıkköy
- Gövdeli
- Günedoğru
- Gürobası
- Güzelköy
- Hudut
- Kadılı
- Kapıdere
- Karanlıkdere
- Karaterzi
- Karşıyaka
- Kelhalil
- Küçüklü
- Kurucaova
- Örencik
- Polat
- Polatderesi
- Reşadiye
- Şatırobası
- Savaklı
- Söğüt
- Suçatı
- Sürgü
- Topraktepe
- Yeni
- Yolkoru
- Yuvalı

== History ==
The 2nd-century geographer Claudius Ptolemy records the city as Zizoatra (Greek: Ζιζόατρα), part of the province (strategia) of Lauiansene in Cappadocia. In Byzantine times, it was known as Sozopetra (Σωζόπετρα) and Zapetra (Ζάπετρα, Zibatra in Arabic).

== Economy ==
Significant improvements in the fruit industry has made agriculture the District's most important source of income. It includes apricots and an increase in the production of apples. Livestock is usually farmed in the village. Both the district and the villages of central and traditional values, importance is given to local custom. Tourism, mountaineering and monitoring local wildlife are also new attractions.

== Transport ==
Doğanşehir has a railway station on the line from Malatya to Adana. State road D.850 passes through the district.

== See also ==
- Anatolian Tigers

== External sources ==
- Doğanşehirliler Derneği, Malatya
- Doğanşehir ilçe Emniyet Müdürlüğü
