= Bağlıca, Kale =

Village in Turkey

Bağlıca
- Neighbourhood
- Location in Turkey
- Coordinates: 38.397°N 38.745°E
- Country: Turkey
- Province: Malatya
- District: Kale
- Population (2025): 560
- Time zone: UTC+3 (TRT)

Bağlıca (Kurdish: Mestikana jêr) is a neighbourhood in the municipality and district of Kale, Malatya Province in Turkey. It is populated by Kurds had a population of 560 in 2025.
