= Ballıkaya, Hekimhan =

Village in Turkey

Ballıkaya
- Neighbourhood
- Location in Turkey
- Coordinates: 38.852°N 38.097°E
- Country: Turkey
- Province: Malatya
- District: Hekimhan
- Population (2025): 222
- Time zone: UTC+3 (TRT)

Ballıkaya is a neighbourhood in the municipality and district of Hekimhan, Malatya Province in Turkey. It is populated by Turks and had a population of 222 in 2025.
