= Çevreli, Arguvan =

Village in Turkey

Çevreli
- Neighbourhood
- Location in Turkey
- Coordinates: 38.803°N 38.188°E
- Country: Turkey
- Province: Malatya
- District: Arguvan
- Population (2025): 170
- Time zone: UTC+3 (TRT)

Çevreli is a neighbourhood in the municipality and district of Arguvan, Malatya Province in Turkey. It is populated by Turks and had a population of 170 in 2025.
