= Kömürlük, Arguvan =

Village in Turkey

Kömürlük
- Neighbourhood
- Location in Turkey
- Coordinates: 38.906°N 38.252°E
- Country: Turkey
- Province: Malatya
- District: Arguvan
- Population (2025): 106
- Time zone: UTC+3 (TRT)

Kömürlük (Kurdish: Komir) is a neighbourhood in the municipality and district of Arguvan, Malatya Province in Turkey. It is populated by Kurds of the Atma tribe and had a population of 106 in 2025.
