= Bozan, Arguvan =

Village in Turkey

Bozan
- Neighbourhood
- Location in Turkey
- Coordinates: 38.831°N 38.226°E
- Country: Turkey
- Province: Malatya
- District: Arguvan
- Population (2025): 64
- Time zone: UTC+3 (TRT)

Bozan is a neighbourhood in the municipality and district of Arguvan, Malatya Province in Turkey. It is populated by ethnic Turks and had a population of 64 in 2025.
