= Kale, Malatya =

Kale
- District and municipality
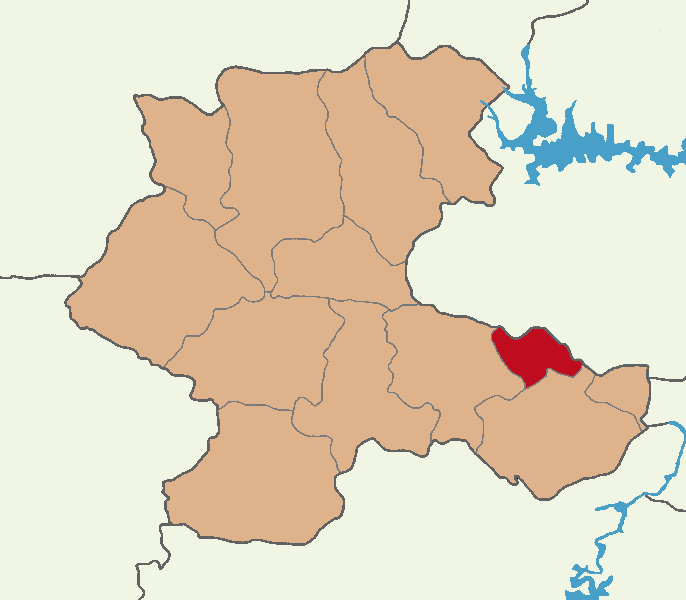
- Map showing Kale District in Malatya Province

- Location within Turkey
- Coordinates: 38°24′58″N 38°46′00″E
- Country: Turkey
- Province: Malatya

Government
  - Mayor: Murat Koca (AKP)
- Area: 237 km^{2} (92 sq mi)
- Population (2022): 5,571
  - Density: 23.5/km^{2} (60.9/sq mi)
- Time zone: UTC+3 (TRT)
- Postal code: 44370
- Area code: 0422
- Website: malatyakale.bel.tr

Kale (Kurdish: Îzolî/Qela) is a municipality and district of Malatya Province, Turkey. Its area is 237 km^{2}, and its population is 5,571 (2022). The mayor is Murat Koca (AKP).

== History ==
The town of Gubbōs (also Gūbōs), which flourished in the Middle Ages and was also the seat of a Syriac Orthodox diocese, is likely to have been located in the municipality.

== Composition ==
There are 28 neighbourhoods in Kale District:

- Abuşoğlu
- Akça
- Akuşağı
- Bağlıca
- Bent
- Çanakçı
- Darıpınar
- Dedeköy
- Düztarla
- Erdemli
- Gülenköy
- Güneyce
- İkizpınar
- Kale
- Karaağaç
- Karahüseyin
- Kıyıcak
- Kozluk
- Kumluyazı
- Mahmutdursun
- Salkımlı
- Sarıot
- Soğukpınar
- Tepebaşı
- Üçdeğirmen
- Uyanık
- Uzunhüseyin
- Yenidamlar

== Demographics ==
The district is fully Sunni Kurdish with the exception of one Kurdish Alevi village.
