= Mezraa, Doğanyol =

Mezraa
- Neighbourhood
- Location in Turkey
- Coordinates: 38°18′56″N 39°03′30″E
- Country: Turkey
- Province: Malatya
- District: Doğanyol
- Population (2022): 55
- Time zone: UTC+3 (TRT)
- Postal code: 44880

Mezraa is a neighbourhood of the municipality and district of Doğanyol, Malatya Province, Turkey. Its population is 55 (2022). It is located on the river Euphrates. The name derives from the Turkish word "mezra" meaning "hamlet".

== History ==
Human settlement has happened in the area for about 10,000 years. In the late 10th century the area came under control of the Byzantine Empire. In the 11th century, the town was ruled by Islamic dynasties such as the Ahlatshahs, then in the 16th the Ottomans took control over the area.

On 24 January 2020, the town was impacted by a magnitude 6.7 earthquake.
