= Aksütlü, Hekimhan =

Village in Turkey

Aksüt
- Neighbourhood
- Location in Turkey
- Coordinates: 38.701°N 38.145°E
- Country: Turkey
- Province: Malatya
- District: Hekimhan
- Population (2025): 95
- Time zone: UTC+3 (TRT)

Aksüt (Kurdish: Hirin) is a neighbourhood in the municipality and district of Hekimhan, Malatya Province in Turkey. It is populated by Kurds and had a population of 95 in 2025.
