= Hacılar, Hekimhan =

Village in Turkey

Hacılar
- Neighbourhood
- Location in Turkey
- Coordinates: 38.882°N 37.854°E
- Country: Turkey
- Province: Malatya
- District: Hekimhan
- Population (2025): 84
- Time zone: UTC+3 (TRT)

Hacılar is a neighbourhood in the municipality and district of Hekimhan, Malatya Province in Turkey. It is populated by Turks and had a population of 84 in 2025.
