= Dikenli, Hekimhan =

Village in Turkey

Dikenli
- Neighbourhood
- Location in Turkey
- Coordinates: 38.680°N 37.920°E
- Country: Turkey
- Province: Malatya
- District: Hekimhan
- Population (2025): 183
- Time zone: UTC+3 (TRT)

Dikenli is a neighbourhood in the municipality and district of Hekimhan, Malatya Province in Turkey. It is populated by Kurds of the Dirêjan tribe and had a population of 183 in 2025.
