= Balaban, Yazıhan =

Village in Turkey

Balaban
- Neighbourhood
- Location in Turkey
- Coordinates: 38.568°N 38.295°E
- Country: Turkey
- Province: Malatya
- District: Yazıhan
- Population (2025): 768
- Time zone: UTC+3 (TRT)

Balaban is a neighbourhood in the municipality and district of Yazıhan, Malatya Province in Turkey. It is populated by Turks and had a population of 768 in 2025.
