= İriağaç, Yazıhan =

Village in Turkey

İriağaç
- Neighbourhood
- Location in Turkey
- Coordinates: 38.557°N 37.984°E
- Country: Turkey
- Province: Malatya
- District: Yazıhan
- Population (2025): 104
- Time zone: UTC+3 (TRT)

İriağaç is a neighbourhood in the municipality and district of Yazıhan, Malatya Province in Turkey. It is populated by Turks and had a population of 104 in 2025.
