= Sazlıca, Hekimhan =

Village in Turkey

Sazlıca
- Neighbourhood
- Location in Turkey
- Coordinates: 38.992°N 38.069°E
- Country: Turkey
- Province: Malatya
- District: Hekimhan
- Population (2025): 119
- Time zone: UTC+3 (TRT)

Sazlıca, also known as Yukarı Sazlıca, is a neighbourhood in the municipality and district of Hekimhan, Malatya Province in Turkey. It is populated by Kurds of the Atma tribe and had a population of 119 in 2025.
