= Davulgu, Hekimhan =

Village in Turkey

Davulgu
- Neighbourhood
- Location in Turkey
- Coordinates: 38.937°N 37.838°E
- Country: Turkey
- Province: Malatya
- District: Hekimhan
- Population (2025): 57
- Time zone: UTC+3 (TRT)

Davulgu is a neighbourhood in the municipality and district of Hekimhan, Malatya Province in Turkey. It is populated by Turks and had a population of 57 in 2025.
