= Kurşunlu, Hekimhan =

Village in Turkey

Kurşunlu
- Neighbourhood
- Location in Turkey
- Coordinates: 38.660°N 37.852°E
- Country: Turkey
- Province: Malatya
- District: Hekimhan
- Population (2025): 1,003
- Time zone: UTC+3 (TRT)

Kurşunlu is a neighbourhood in the municipality and district of Hekimhan, Malatya Province in Turkey. It is populated by Kurds and had a population of 1,003 in 2025.
