= Yukarısülmenli, Arguvan =

Village in Turkey

Yukarısülmenli
- Neighbourhood
- Location in Turkey
- Coordinates: 38.742°N 38.250°E
- Country: Turkey
- Province: Malatya
- District: Arguvan
- Population (2025): 156
- Time zone: UTC+3 (TRT)

Yukarısülmenli is a neighbourhood in the municipality and district of Arguvan, Malatya Province in Turkey. It is populated by Turks and had a population of 156 in 2025.
