= İçmece, Arguvan =

Village in Turkey

İçmece
- Neighbourhood
- Location in Turkey
- Coordinates: 38.707°N 38.429°E
- Country: Turkey
- Province: Malatya
- District: Arguvan
- Population (2025): 121
- Time zone: UTC+3 (TRT)

İçmece (Kurdish: Çermîk) is a neighbourhood in the municipality and district of Arguvan, Malatya Province in Turkey. It is populated by Kurds and Turks and had a population of 121 in 2025.
