= Gövük, Yazıhan =

Village in Turkey

Gövük
- Neighbourhood
- Location in Turkey
- Coordinates: 38.586°N 38.219°E
- Country: Turkey
- Province: Malatya
- District: Yazıhan
- Population (2025): 343
- Time zone: UTC+3 (TRT)

Gövük is a neighbourhood in the municipality and district of Yazıhan, Malatya Province in Turkey. It is populated by Kurds and had a population of 343 in 2025.
