= Asar, Arguvan =

Village in Turkey

Asar
- Neighbourhood
- Location in Turkey
- Coordinates: 38.714°N 38.212°E
- Country: Turkey
- Province: Malatya
- District: Arguvan
- Population (2025): 152
- Time zone: UTC+3 (TRT)

Asar is a neighbourhood in the municipality and district of Arguvan, Malatya Province in Turkey. It is populated by Kurds and Turks and had a population of 152 in 2025.

== Notable people ==
- İlyas Salman
