= Arguvan =

- District and municipality
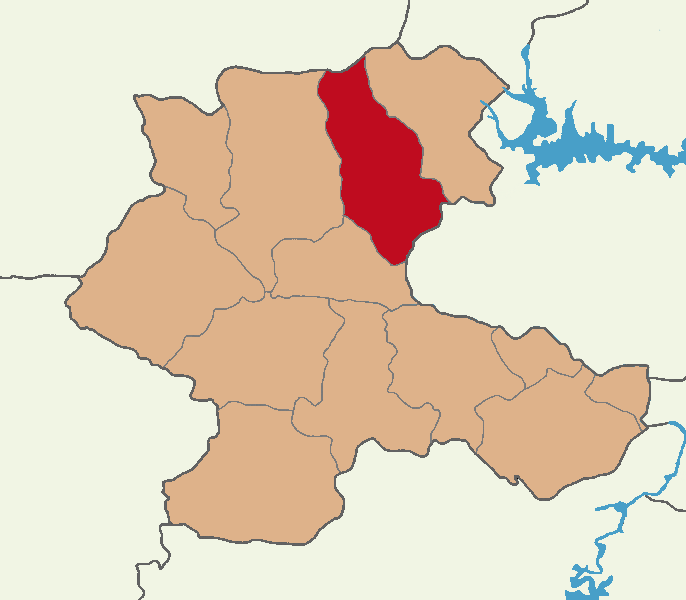
- Map showing Arguvan District in Malatya Province

- Location within Turkey
- Coordinates: 38°46′31″N 38°16′16″E
- Country: Turkey
- Province: Malatya

Government
  - Mayor: Ersoy Eren (New Party)
- Area: 1,096 km^{2} (423 sq mi)
- Elevation: 1,150 m (3,770 ft)
- Population (2022): 6,869
  - Density: 6.267/km^{2} (16.23/sq mi)
- Time zone: UTC+3 (TRT)
- Postal code: 44960
- Area code: 0422
- Website: www.arguvan.bel.tr

Arguvan (Kurdish: Erxewan/Arxewan) is a municipality and district of Malatya Province, Turkey. Its area is 1,096 km^{2}, and its population is 6,869 (2022). The mayor is Ersoy Eren (New Party).

== Composition ==
There are 49 neighbourhoods in Arguvan District:

- Akören
- Alhasuşağı
- Armutlu
- Aşağısülmenli
- Asar
- Asmaca
- Bahçeli
- Bahçelievler
- Bozan
- Çakmak
- Çavuşköy
- Çayırlı
- Çevreli
- Çiftlik
- Dolaylı
- Doydum
- Ermişli
- Eymir
- Göçeruşağı
- Gökağaç
- Gümüşlü
- Güngören
- Gürge
- Güveçli
- Hakverdi
- İçmece
- İsaköy
- Karababa
- Karababa
- Karahüyük
- Kızık
- Kızıluşağı
- Koçak
- Kömürlük
- Konakbaşı
- Kuruttaş
- Kuyudere
- Morhamam
- Narmikan
- Parçikan
- Şotik
- Tarlacık
- Tatkınık
- Tepebağ
- Yamaç
- Yeni
- Yeniköy
- Yoncalı
- Yukarısülmenli
- Yürektaşı

== Demographics ==
The majority of the district is Alevi from both Kurdish and Turkish ethnicity. The Kurdish Atman tribe reside in ten villages and hamlets in the district. Other Kurdish tribes include the Direjan, Kurecik, and the Parçikan.

== Notable people ==
- Barış Kılıç
- İlyas Salman
- Kemal Bülbül
