= Tecirli, Yazıhan =

Village in Turkey

Tecirli
- Neighbourhood
- Location in Turkey
- Coordinates: 38.503°N 38.285°E
- Country: Turkey
- Province: Malatya
- District: Yazıhan
- Population (2025): 426
- Time zone: UTC+3 (TRT)

Tecirli is a neighbourhood in the municipality and district of Yazıhan, Malatya Province in Turkey. It is populated by Kurds and Turks and had a population of 426 in 2025.
