= Kurucaova, Doğanşehir =

Village in Turkey

Kurucaova
- Neighbourhood
- Location in Turkey
- Coordinates: 37.981°N 38.113°E
- Country: Turkey
- Province: Malatya
- District: Doğanşehir
- Population (2025): 3,453
- Time zone: UTC+3 (TRT)

Kurucaova is a neighbourhood in the municipality and district of Doğanşehir, Malatya Province in Turkey. It is populated by Kurds and had a population of 3,453 in 2025.
