= Saraylı, Hekimhan =

Village in Turkey

Saraylı
- Neighbourhood
- Location in Turkey
- Coordinates: 38.983°N 38.037°E
- Country: Turkey
- Province: Malatya
- District: Hekimhan
- Population (2025): 79
- Time zone: UTC+3 (TRT)

Saraylı is a neighbourhood in the municipality and district of Hekimhan, Malatya Province in Turkey. It is populated by Kurds of the Atma tribe and had a population of 79 in 2025.
