= Karaağaç, Kale =

Village in Turkey

Karaağaç
- Neighbourhood
- Location in Turkey
- Coordinates: 38.392°N 38.834°E
- Country: Turkey
- Province: Malatya
- District: Kale
- Population (2025): 183
- Time zone: UTC+3 (TRT)

Karaağaç is a neighbourhood in the municipality and district of Kale, Malatya Province in Turkey. It is populated by Kurds of the Herdî tribe and had a population of 183 in 2025.
