= Akyazı, Yazıhan =

Village in Turkey

Akyazı
- Neighbourhood
- Location in Turkey
- Coordinates: 38.687°N 38.123°E
- Country: Turkey
- Province: Malatya
- District: Yazıhan
- Population (2025): 277
- Time zone: UTC+3 (TRT)

Akyazı is a neighbourhood in the municipality and district of Yazıhan, Malatya Province in Turkey. It is populated by Kurds of the Dirêjan tribe and by Turks and had a population of 277 in 2025.
