= Yamaç, Arguvan =

Village in Turkey

Yamaç
- Neighbourhood
- Location in Turkey
- Coordinates: 38.798°N 38.408°E
- Country: Turkey
- Province: Malatya
- District: Arguvan
- Population (2025): 80
- Time zone: UTC+3 (TRT)

Yamaç is a neighbourhood in the municipality and district of Arguvan, Malatya Province in Turkey. It is populated by Turks had a population of 80 in 2025.
