= Armutlu, Arguvan =

Village in Turkey

Armutlu
- Neighbourhood
- Location in Turkey
- Coordinates: 38.842°N 38.180°E
- Country: Turkey
- Province: Malatya
- District: Arguvan
- Population (2025): 99
- Time zone: UTC+3 (TRT)

Armutlu is a neighbourhood in the municipality and district of Arguvan, Malatya Province in Turkey. It is populated by Turks and had a population of 99 in 2025.
