= Adagören, Battalgazi =

Village in Turkey

Adagören
- Neighbourhood
- Location in Turkey
- Coordinates: 38.446°N 38.467°E
- Country: Turkey
- Province: Malatya
- District: Battalgazi
- Population (2025): 128
- Time zone: UTC+3 (TRT)

Adagören is a neighbourhood in the municipality and district of Battalgazi, Malatya Province in Turkey. It is populated by Kurds of the Herdî tribe had a population of 128 in 2025.
