= Hasançelebi, Hekimhan =

Village in Turkey

Hasançelebi
- Neighbourhood
- Location in Turkey
- Coordinates: 38.953°N 37.890°E
- Country: Turkey
- Province: Malatya
- District: Hekimhan
- Population (2025): 556
- Time zone: UTC+3 (TRT)

Hasançelebi is a neighbourhood in the municipality and district of Hekimhan, Malatya Province in Turkey. It is populated by Turks and had a population of 556 in 2025.

The hamlet of Karagüney is populated by Kurds of the Sinemili tribe.

== See also ==
- Hasançelebi mine
