= Morhamam, Arguvan =

Village in Turkey

Morhamam
- Neighbourhood
- Location in Turkey
- Coordinates: 38.686°N 38.379°E
- Country: Turkey
- Province: Malatya
- District: Arguvan
- Population (2025): 101
- Time zone: UTC+3 (TRT)

Morhamam is a neighbourhood in the municipality and district of Arguvan, Malatya Province in Turkey. It is populated by Turks and had a population of 101 in 2025.
