= Kemerköprü, Battalgazi =

Village in Turkey

Kemerköprü
- Neighbourhood
- Location in Turkey
- Coordinates: 38.445°N 38.332°E
- Country: Turkey
- Province: Malatya
- District: Battalgazi
- Population (2025): 1,170
- Time zone: UTC+3 (TRT)

Kemerköprü is a neighbourhood in the municipality and district of Battalgazi, Malatya Province in Turkey. It is populated by Kurds of the Reşwan tribe had a population of 1,170 in 2025.
