= Fethiye, Yazıhan =

Village in Turkey

Fethiye
- Neighbourhood
- Location within Turkey
- Coordinates: 38.624°N 38.135°E
- Country: Turkey
- Province: Malatya
- District: Yazıhan
- Population (2025): 962
- Time zone: UTC+3 (TRT)

Fethiye is a neighbourhood in the municipality and district of Yazıhan, Malatya Province in Turkey. It is populated by Kurds, Armenians and Turks and had a population of 962 in 2025.
