= Alvar, Kuluncak =

Village in Turkey

Alvar
- Neighbourhood
- Location in Turkey
- Coordinates: 38.900°N 37.612°E
- Country: Turkey
- Province: Malatya
- District: Kuluncak
- Population (2025): 283
- Time zone: UTC+3 (TRT)

Alvar, also known as Yünlüce, is a neighbourhood in the municipality and district of Kuluncak, Malatya Province in Turkey. It is populated by Turks had a population of 283 in 2025.
