= Akmağara, Hekimhan =

Village in Turkey

Akmağara
- Neighbourhood
- Location in Turkey
- Coordinates: 39.025°N 37.808°E
- Country: Turkey
- Province: Malatya
- District: Hekimhan
- Population (2025): 156
- Time zone: UTC+3 (TRT)

Akmağara is a neighbourhood in the municipality and district of Hekimhan, Malatya Province in Turkey. It is populated by Turks and had a population of 156 in 2025.
