= Karaca, Yazıhan =

Village in Turkey

Karaca
- Neighbourhood
- Location in Turkey
- Coordinates: 38.656°N 38.209°E
- Country: Turkey
- Province: Malatya
- District: Yazıhan
- Population (2025): 195
- Time zone: UTC+3 (TRT)

Karaca is a neighbourhood in the municipality and district of Yazıhan, Malatya Province in Turkey. It is populated by Turks and had a population of 195 in 2025.
