= Kozdere, Hekimhan =

Village in Turkey

Kozdere
- Neighbourhood
- Location in Turkey
- Coordinates: 38.909°N 38.060°E
- Country: Turkey
- Province: Malatya
- District: Hekimhan
- Population (2025): 106
- Time zone: UTC+3 (TRT)

Kozdere is a neighbourhood in the municipality and district of Hekimhan, Malatya Province in Turkey. It is populated by Turks and had a population of 106 in 2025.

The hamlet of Otmangölü is populated by Kurds of the Dirêjan tribe.
