= Çulhalı, Hekimhan =

Village in Turkey

Çulhalı
- Neighbourhood
- Location in Turkey
- Coordinates: 38.913°N 37.917°E
- Country: Turkey
- Province: Malatya
- District: Hekimhan
- Population (2025): 108
- Time zone: UTC+3 (TRT)

Çulhalı is a neighbourhood in the municipality and district of Hekimhan, Malatya Province in Turkey. It is populated by Turks and had a population of 108 in 2025.
