= Yazıhan =

- District and municipality
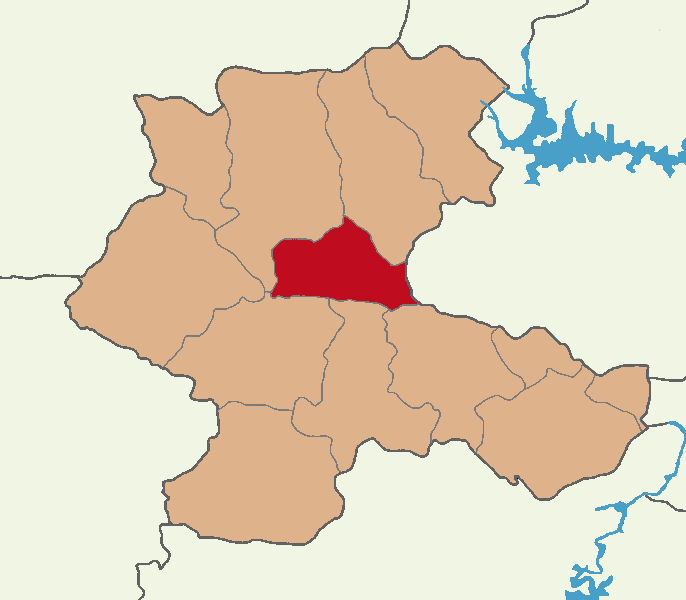
- Map showing Yazıhan District in Malatya Province

- Location within Turkey
- Coordinates: 38°35′49″N 38°11′16″E
- Country: Turkey
- Province: Malatya

Government
  - Mayor: Nevzat Öztürk (AKP)
- Area: 653 km^{2} (252 sq mi)
- Population (2022): 11,984
  - Density: 18.4/km^{2} (47.5/sq mi)
- Time zone: UTC+3 (TRT)
- Postal code: 44350
- Area code: 0422
- Website: www.yazihan.bel.tr

Yazıhan (Kurdish: Patrîkxan) is a municipality and district of Malatya Province, Turkey. Its area is 653 km^{2}, and its population is 11,984 (2022). The mayor is Abdulvahap Göçer (CHP).

The municipality is populated by Kurds and Turks.

== Composition ==
There are 33 neighbourhoods in Yazıhan District:

- Akyazı
- Alican
- Ambarcık
- Bahçelievler
- Balaban
- Bereketli
- Böğürtlen
- Boyaca
- Boztepe
- Buzluk
- Çavuş
- Çivril
- Dedekargın
- Doğuş
- Durucasu
- Eğribük
- Epreme
- Erecek
- Fethiye
- Gayret
- Gövük
- Hamidiye
- İriağaç
- Karaca
- Kömüşhan
- Koşar
- Mısırdere
- Sadıklı
- Sinanlı
- Sürür
- Tahtalı
- Tecirli
- Yeni

== Notable people ==
- Sebahat Tuncel, Kurdish politician in Turkey
