= Battalgazi =

- District and municipality
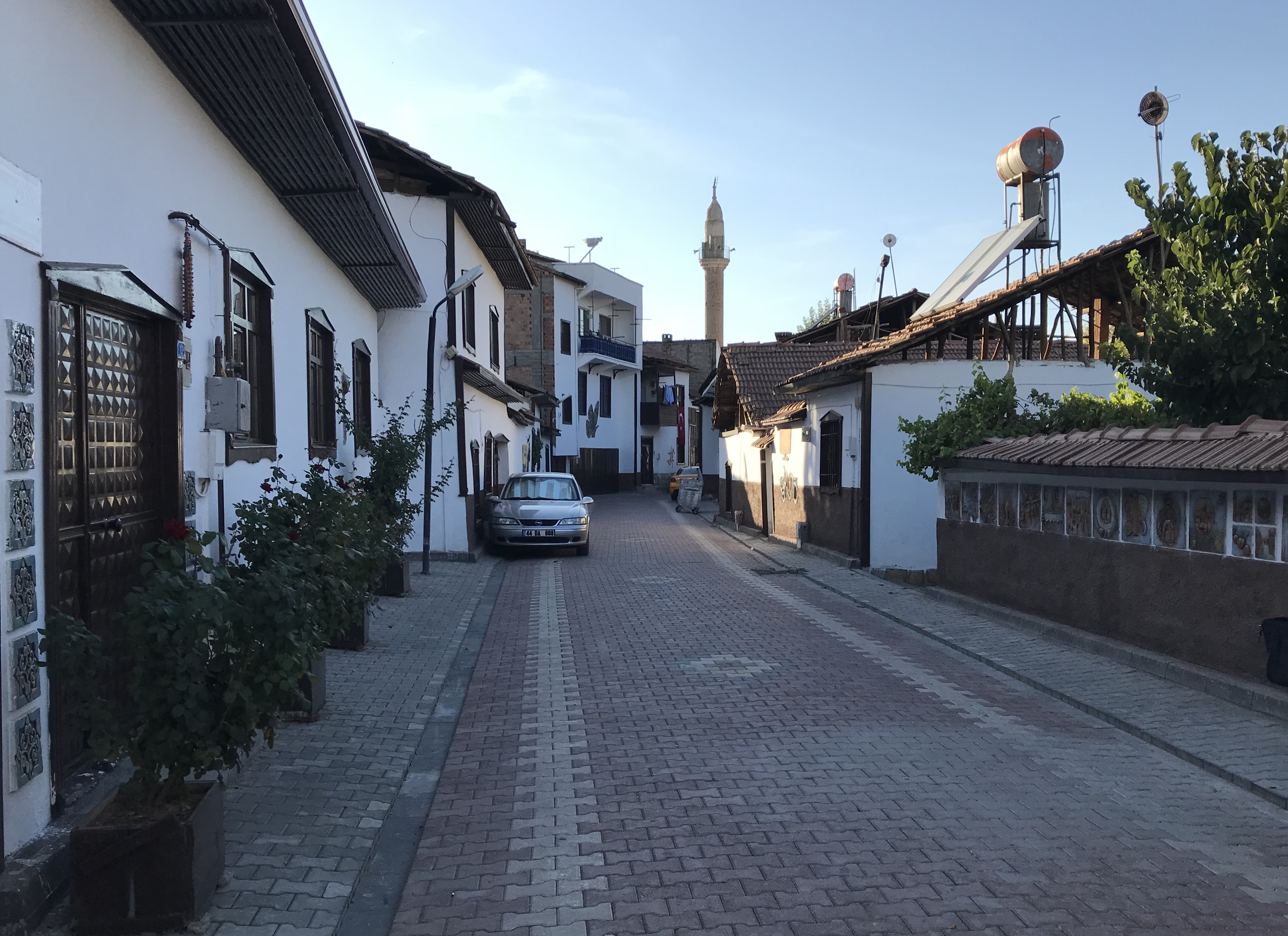

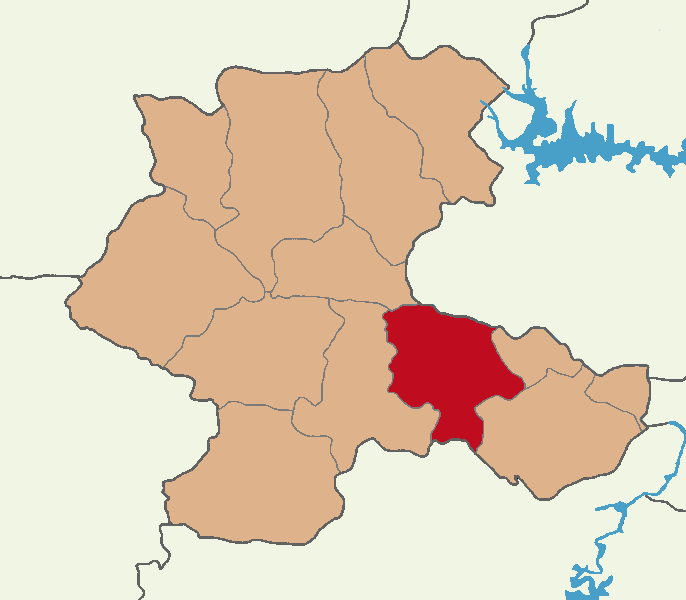
- Map showing Battalgazi District in Malatya Province

- Location within Turkey
- Coordinates: 38°25′22″N 38°21′56″E
- Country: Turkey
- Province: Malatya

Government
  - Mayor: Bayram Taşkın (AKP)
- Area: 947 km^{2} (366 sq mi)
- Population (2022): 307,478
  - Density: 325/km^{2} (841/sq mi)
- Time zone: UTC+3 (TRT)
- Area code: 0422
- Website: www.battalgazi.bel.tr

Battalgazi (Kurdish: Betalqazî), formerly and colloquially Eskimalatya (Older Malatya), is a municipality and district of Malatya Province, Turkey. Its area is 947 km^{2}, and its population is 307,478 (2022). At the 2013 reorganisation part of the former central district of Malatya Province was added to the district.

The municipality is populated by Kurds of the Dirêjan and Reşwan tribes and by Turks.

== Composition ==
There are 104 neighbourhoods in Battalgazi District:

- Adagören
- Ağılyazı
- Akpınar
- Alacakapı
- Alhanuşağı
- Alişar
- Aslanbey
- Ataköy
- Bağtepe
- Bahçelievler
- Bahri
- Başharık
- Battalgazi
- Beydağı
- Beylerbaşı
- Boran
- Bulgurlu
- Bulutlu
- Büyük Hüseyin Bey
- Büyük Mustafa Paşa
- Çamurlu
- Cevherizade
- Cirikpınar
- Çolaklı
- Çolakoğlu
- Çöşnük
- Dabakhane
- Dolamantepe
- Düzyol
- Ferhadiye
- Fırat
- Fırıncı
- Göller
- Göztepe
- Gülümuşağı
- Hacıabdi
- Hacıhaliloğluçiftliği
- Hacıyusuflar
- Halfettin
- Hamidiye
- Hanımınçiftliği
- Hasan Varol
- Hasırcılar
- Hatunsuyu
- Hidayet
- Hisartepe
- İskender
- İsmetiye
- İstiklal
- İzzetiye
- Kadıçayırı
- Kamıştaş
- Kapıkaya
- Karabağlar
- Karagöz
- Karahan
- Karakaşçiftliği
- Karaköy
- Karatepe
- Kavaklıbağ
- Kemerköprü
- Kernek
- Kıraç
- Kırçuval
- Küçük Hüsüyin Bey
- Küçük Mustafa Paşa
- Kuluşağı
- Merdivenler
- Merkez Beydağı
- Meydanbaşı
- Meydancık
- Niyazi
- Nuriye
- Orduzu
- Paşaköşkü
- Pelitli
- Sancaktar
- Saray
- Sarıcıoğlu
- Şehit Fevzi
- Selçuklu
- Selvidağ
- Serintepe
- Şifa
- Şık Şık
- Şişman
- Tandoğan
- Tanışık
- Taştepe
- Tokluca
- Toptaş
- Toygar
- Uçbağlar
- Uluköy
- Üniversite
- Üzümlü
- Yamaç
- Yarımcahan
- Yaygın
- Yenice
- Yenihamam
- Yeniköy
- Yıldıztepe
- Zafer

== Sports ==
The 2023-opened Orduzu Sports Complex is a multi-sport venue located in Orduzu neighborhood.
