= Salkımlı, Kale =

Village in Turkey

Salkımlı
- Neighbourhood
- Location in Turkey
- Coordinates: 38.386°N 38.744°E
- Country: Turkey
- Province: Malatya
- District: Kale
- Population (2025): 426
- Time zone: UTC+3 (TRT)

Salkımlı (Kurdish: Mestikana jor) is a neighbourhood in the municipality and district of Kale, Malatya Province in Turkey. It is populated by Kurds had a population of 426 in 2025.
