= Basak, Hekimhan =

Village in Turkey

Basak
- Neighbourhood
- Location in Turkey
- Coordinates: 38.945°N 37.960°E
- Country: Turkey
- Province: Malatya
- District: Hekimhan
- Population (2025): 389
- Time zone: UTC+3 (TRT)

Basak is a neighbourhood in the municipality and district of Hekimhan, Malatya Province in Turkey. It is populated by Turks and had a population of 389 in 2025.
