= Yağca, Hekimhan =

Village in Turkey

Yağca
- Neighbourhood
- Location in Turkey
- Coordinates: 38.779°N 38.059°E
- Country: Turkey
- Province: Malatya
- District: Hekimhan
- Population (2025): 115
- Time zone: UTC+3 (TRT)

Yağca is a neighbourhood in the municipality and district of Hekimhan, Malatya Province in Turkey. It is populated by Kurds and had a population of 115 in 2025.
