= Çömlekoba, Doğanşehir =

Village in Turkey

Çömlekoba
- Neighbourhood
- Location in Turkey
- Coordinates: 38.096°N 37.943°E
- Country: Turkey
- Province: Malatya
- District: Doğanşehir
- Population (2025): 251
- Time zone: UTC+3 (TRT)

Çömlekoba (Kurdish: Gundê Guharê) is a neighbourhood in the municipality and district of Doğanşehir, Malatya Province in Turkey. It is populated by Kurds of the Balan tribe and had a population of 251 in 2025.
