= Boztepe, Yazıhan =

Village in Turkey

Boztepe
- Neighbourhood
- Location in Turkey
- Coordinates: 38.684°N 38.153°E
- Country: Turkey
- Province: Malatya
- District: Yazıhan
- Population (2025): 104
- Time zone: UTC+3 (TRT)

Boztepe is a neighbourhood in the municipality and district of Yazıhan, Malatya Province in Turkey. It is populated by Kurds of the Dirêjan tribe and had a population of 104 in 2025.
