= Topraktepe, Doğanşehir =

Village in Turkey

Topraktepe
- Neighbourhood
- Location in Turkey
- Coordinates: 38.099°N 37.853°E
- Country: Turkey
- Province: Malatya
- District: Doğanşehir
- Population (2025): 488
- Time zone: UTC+3 (TRT)

Topraktepe is a neighbourhood in the municipality and district of Doğanşehir, Malatya Province in Turkey. It is populated by Kurds of the Atma tribe and had a population of 488 in 2025.
