= Güngören, Arguvan =

Village in Turkey

Güngören
- Neighbourhood
- Location in Turkey
- Coordinates: 38.886°N 38.241°E
- Country: Turkey
- Province: Malatya
- District: Arguvan
- Population (2025): 108
- Time zone: UTC+3 (TRT)

Güngören (Kurdish: Qadabela) is a neighbourhood in the municipality and district of Arguvan, Malatya Province in Turkey. It is populated by Kurds of the Atma tribe and had a population of 108 in 2025.
