= Beykent, Hekimhan =

Village in Turkey

Beykent
- Neighbourhood
- Location in Turkey
- Coordinates: 38.862°N 37.875°E
- Country: Turkey
- Province: Malatya
- District: Hekimhan
- Population (2025): 108
- Time zone: UTC+3 (TRT)

Beykent is a neighbourhood in the municipality and district of Hekimhan, Malatya Province in Turkey. It is populated by Turks and had a population of 108 in 2025.
