= Tatkınık, Arguvan =

Village in Turkey

Tatkınık
- Neighbourhood
- Location in Turkey
- Coordinates: 38.766°N 38.187°E
- Country: Turkey
- Province: Malatya
- District: Arguvan
- Population (2025): 192
- Time zone: UTC+3 (TRT)

Tatkınık is a neighbourhood in the municipality and district of Arguvan, Malatya Province in Turkey. It is populated by Kurds of the Dirêjan tribe and by Turks and had a population of 192 in 2025.
