= Suçatı, Doğanşehir =

Village in Turkey

Suçatı
- Neighbourhood
- Location in Turkey
- Coordinates: 38.195°N 37.985°E
- Country: Turkey
- Province: Malatya
- District: Doğanşehir
- Population (2025): 160
- Time zone: UTC+3 (TRT)

Suçatı is a neighbourhood in the municipality and district of Doğanşehir, Malatya Province in Turkey. It is populated by Kurds of the Balan tribe and had a population of 160 in 2025.
