= Doğanyol =

- District and municipality
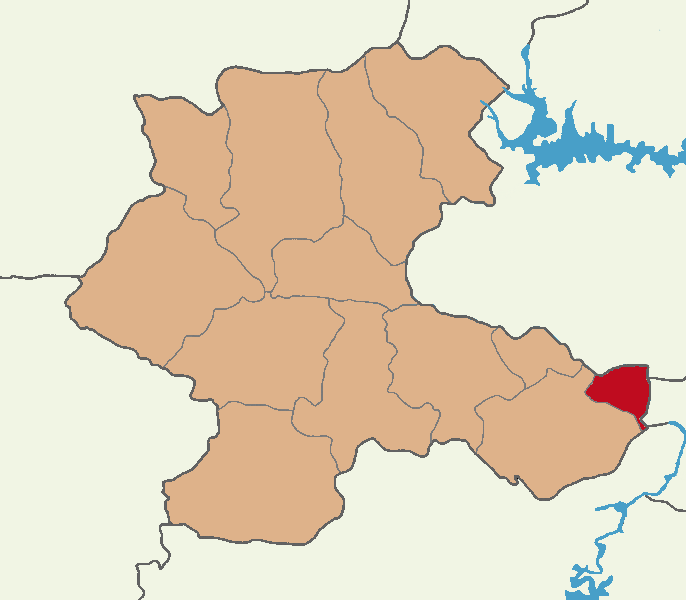
- Map showing Doğanyol District in Malatya Province

- Location within Turkey
- Coordinates: 38°18′38″N 39°02′22″E
- Country: Turkey
- Province: Malatya

Government
  - Mayor: Hakan Bay (AKP)
- Area: 177 km^{2} (68 sq mi)
- Elevation: 950 m (3,120 ft)
- Population (2022): 3,705
  - Density: 20.9/km^{2} (54.2/sq mi)
- Time zone: UTC+3 (TRT)
- Postal code: 44880
- Area code: 0422
- Website: www.doganyol.bel.tr

Doğanyol (Kurdish: Keferdîz) is a municipality and district of Malatya Province, Turkey. Its area is 177 km^{2}, and its population is 3,705 (2022). The mayor is Hakan Bay (AKP).

== Demographics ==
The town is populated by Kurds.

== History ==
Doğanyol has become district in 1990 during Turgut Özal presidency. Doğanyol is 90 km far away to Malatya city center.

On 24 January 2020 the town was impacted by a magnitude 6.7 earthquake.

== Composition ==
There are 16 neighbourhoods in Doğanyol District:

- Akkent
- Behramlı
- Burçköy
- Çolak
- Damlı
- Gevheruşağı
- Gökçe
- Gümüşsu
- İshak
- Koldere
- Konurtay
- Mezraa
- Poyraz
- Ulutaş
- Yalınca
- Yeşilköy
