= İğdir, Hekimhan =

Village in Turkey

İğdir
- Neighbourhood
- Location in Turkey
- Coordinates: 38.853°N 38.066°E
- Country: Turkey
- Province: Malatya
- District: Hekimhan
- Population (2025): 229
- Time zone: UTC+3 (TRT)

İğdir is a neighbourhood in the municipality and district of Hekimhan, Malatya Province in Turkey. It is populated by Turks and had a population of 229 in 2025.
