= Bereketli, Yazıhan =

Village in Turkey

Bereketli
- Neighbourhood
- Location in Turkey
- Coordinates: 38.515°N 38.149°E
- Country: Turkey
- Province: Malatya
- District: Yazıhan
- Population (2025): 219
- Time zone: UTC+3 (TRT)

Bereketli is a neighbourhood in the municipality and district of Yazıhan, Malatya Province in Turkey. It is populated by Turks and had a population of 219 in 2025.
