= Karaterzi, Doğanşehir =

Village in Turkey

Karaterzi
- Neighbourhood
- Location in Turkey
- Coordinates: 38.197°N 37.899°E
- Country: Turkey
- Province: Malatya
- District: Doğanşehir
- Population (2025): 359
- Time zone: UTC+3 (TRT)

Karaterzi is a neighbourhood in the municipality and district of Doğanşehir, Malatya Province in Turkey. It is populated by Kurds and Turks and had a population of 359 in 2025.
