= Koldere, Doğanyol =

Village in Turkey

Koldere
- Neighbourhood
- Location in Turkey
- Coordinates: 38.294°N 38.951°E
- Country: Turkey
- Province: Malatya
- District: Doğanyol
- Population (2025): 514
- Time zone: UTC+3 (TRT)

Koldere (Kurdish: Mamaş) is a neighborhood in the municipality and district of Doğanyol, Malatya Province in Turkey. It is populated by Kurds of the Herdî tribe and had a population of 514 in 2025.
