= Eymir, Arguvan =

Village in Turkey

Eymir
- Neighbourhood
- Location in Turkey
- Coordinates: 38.859°N 38.225°E
- Country: Turkey
- Province: Malatya
- District: Arguvan
- Population (2025): 187
- Time zone: UTC+3 (TRT)

Eymir is a neighbourhood in the municipality and district of Arguvan, Malatya Province in Turkey. It is populated by Turks and had a population of 187 in 2025.
