= Kızık, Arguvan =

Village in Turkey

Kızık
- Neighbourhood
- Location in Turkey
- Coordinates: 38.869°N 38.227°E
- Country: Turkey
- Province: Malatya
- District: Arguvan
- Population (2025): 88
- Time zone: UTC+3 (TRT)

Kızık is a neighbourhood in the municipality and district of Arguvan, Malatya Province in Turkey. It is populated by Turks of the and had a population of 88 in 2025.
