= Köylüköyü, Hekimhan =

Village in Turkey

Köylüköyü
- Neighbourhood
- Location in Turkey
- Coordinates: 38.996°N 37.895°E
- Country: Turkey
- Province: Malatya
- District: Hekimhan
- Population (2025): 154
- Time zone: UTC+3 (TRT)

Köylüköyü is a neighbourhood in the municipality and district of Hekimhan, Malatya Province in Turkey. It is populated by Turks and had a population of 154 in 2025.

The hamlet of Çobanyusuf is populated by Kurds of the Dirêjan tribe.
