= Dedeyazı, Doğanşehir =

Village in Turkey

Dedeyazı
- Neighbourhood
- Location in Turkey
- Coordinates: 38.224°N 37.866°E
- Country: Turkey
- Province: Malatya
- District: Doğanşehir
- Population (2025): 271
- Time zone: UTC+3 (TRT)

Dedeyazı (Kurdish: Dedefeng) is a neighbourhood in the municipality and district of Doğanşehir, Malatya Province in Turkey. It is populated by Kurds and Turks and had a population of 271 in 2025.
