= Aşağısazlıca, Hekimhan =

Village in Turkey

Aşağısazlıca
- Neighbourhood
- Location in Turkey
- Coordinates: 38.936°N 38.023°E
- Country: Turkey
- Province: Malatya
- District: Hekimhan
- Population (2025): 161
- Time zone: UTC+3 (TRT)

Aşağısazlıca is a neighbourhood in the municipality and district of Hekimhan, Malatya Province in Turkey. It is populated by Kurds of the Atma tribe and had a population of 161 in 2025.
