= Yalınca, Doğanyol =

Village in Turkey

Yalınca
- Neighbourhood
- Location in Turkey
- Coordinates: 38.306°N 39.127°E
- Country: Turkey
- Province: Malatya
- District: Doğanyol
- Population (2025): 51
- Time zone: UTC+3 (TRT)

Yalınca (Kurdish: Tilme) is a neighborhood in the municipality and district of Doğanyol, Malatya Province in Turkey. It is populated by Kurds and had a population of 51 in 2025.
