= Bıyıkboğazı, Kuluncak =

Village in Turkey

Bıyıkboğazı
- Neighbourhood
- Location in Turkey
- Coordinates: 38.935°N 37.694°E
- Country: Turkey
- Province: Malatya
- District: Kuluncak
- Population (2025): 156
- Time zone: UTC+3 (TRT)

Bıyıkboğazı is a neighbourhood in the municipality and district of Kuluncak, Malatya Province in Turkey. It is populated by Kurds had a population of 156 in 2025.
