= Ambarcık, Yazıhan =

Village in Turkey

Ambarcık
- Neighbourhood
- Location in Turkey
- Coordinates: 38.580°N 38.308°E
- Country: Turkey
- Province: Malatya
- District: Yazıhan
- Population (2025): 279
- Time zone: UTC+3 (TRT)

Ambarcık is a neighbourhood in the municipality and district of Yazıhan, Malatya Province in Turkey. It is populated by Kurds and Turks and had a population of 279 in 2025.
