= Karahüseyin, Kale =

Village in Turkey

Karahüseyin
- Neighbourhood
- Location in Turkey
- Coordinates: 38.348208°N 38.91°E
- Country: Turkey
- Province: Malatya
- District: Kale
- Population (2025): 96
- Time zone: UTC+3 (TRT)

Karahüseyin is a neighbourhood in the municipality and district of Kale, Malatya Province in Turkey. It is populated by Kurds of the Herdî tribe and had a population of 96 in 2025.
