= Yürektaşı, Arguvan =

Village in Turkey

Yürektaşı
- Neighbourhood
- Location in Turkey
- Coordinates: 38.769°N 38.157°E
- Country: Turkey
- Province: Malatya
- District: Arguvan
- Population (2025): 51
- Time zone: UTC+3 (TRT)

Yürektaşı is a neighbourhood in the municipality and district of Arguvan, Malatya Province in Turkey. It is populated by Kurds and had a population of 51 in 2025.
