= Alhasuşağı, Arguvan =

Village in Turkey

Alhasuşağı
- Neighbourhood
- Location within Turkey
- Coordinates: 38.932°N 38.271°E
- Country: Turkey
- Province: Malatya
- District: Arguvan
- Population (2025): 85
- Time zone: UTC+3 (TRT)

Alhasuşağı is a neighbourhood in the municipality and district of Arguvan, Malatya Province in Turkey. It is populated by Kurds of the Atma tribe and had a population of 85 in 2025.
