= Karaköçek, Hekimhan =

Village in Turkey

Karaköçek
- Neighbourhood
- Location in Turkey
- Coordinates: 38.901°N 38.007°E
- Country: Turkey
- Province: Malatya
- District: Hekimhan
- Population (2025): 123
- Time zone: UTC+3 (TRT)

Karaköçek is a neighbourhood in the municipality and district of Hekimhan, Malatya Province in Turkey. It is populated by Turks and had a population of 123 in 2025.
