= Kuluşağı, Battalgazi =

Village in Turkey

Kuluşağı
- Neighbourhood
- Location in Turkey
- Coordinates: 38.442°N 38.531°E
- Country: Turkey
- Province: Malatya
- District: Battalgazi
- Population (2025): 429
- Time zone: UTC+3 (TRT)

Kuluşağı is a neighbourhood in the municipality and district of Battalgazi, Malatya Province in Turkey. It is populated by Kurds of the Herdî tribe had a population of 429 in 2025.
