= Hekimhan =

- District and municipality
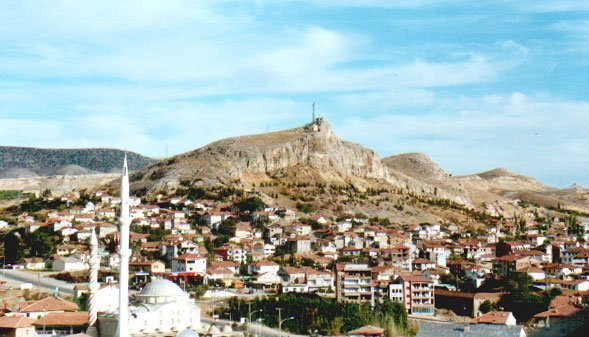

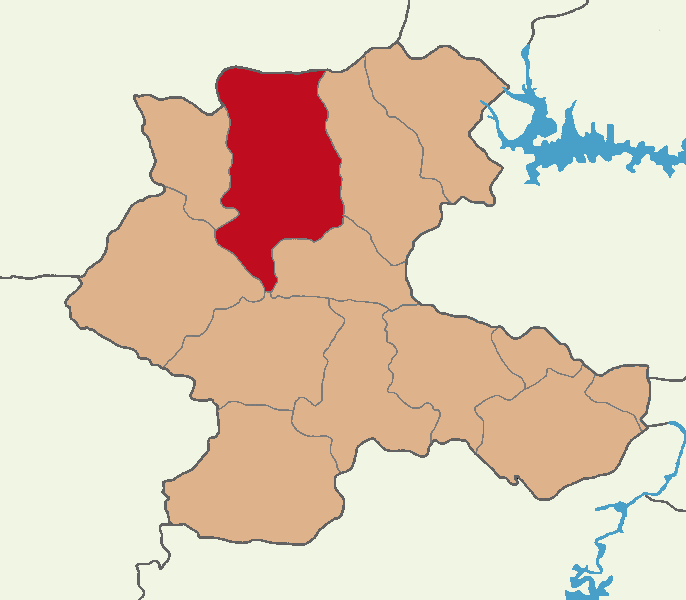
- Map showing Hekimhan District in Malatya Province

- Location within Turkey
- Coordinates: 38°48′59″N 37°55′58″E
- Country: Turkey
- Province: Malatya

Government
  - Mayor: Mehmet Şerif Yıldırım (New Party)
- Area: 1,514 km^{2} (585 sq mi)
- Elevation: 1,075 m (3,527 ft)
- Population (2022): 3,705
  - Density: 2.447/km^{2} (6.338/sq mi)
- Time zone: UTC+3 (TRT)
- Postal code: 44400
- Area code: 0422
- Website: www.hekimhan.bel.tr

Hekimhan is a municipality and district of Malatya Province, Turkey. Its area is 1,514 km^{2}, and its population is 15,706 (2022). It is located in the upper Euphrates in Eastern Anatolia. Hekimhan is 1,075 m above sea level. The highest point in Hekimhan is Zurbahan mountain (2,091 m). The mayor is Mehmet Şerif Yıldırım (New Party).

== Historical sites ==
Taşhan caravanserai (constructed by the Seljuk Turks), a hamam (Turkish bathhouse) and a mosque built by the Ottomans are some notable historical structures in the town.

== Composition ==
There are 65 neighbourhoods in Hekimhan District:

- Akmağara
- Aksütlü
- Aşağısazlıca
- Bağyolu
- Bahçedamı
- Bahçelievler
- Ballıkaya
- Basak
- Başkavak
- Başkınık
- Beykent
- Boğazgören
- Budaklı
- Çanakpınar
- Çimenlik
- Çulhalı
- Davulgu
- Delihasanyurdu
- Dereköy
- Deveci
- Dikenli
- Dikili
- Dumlu
- Dursunlu
- Fatih
- Girmana
- Güçlü
- Güvenç
- Güzelyayla
- Güzelyurt
- Hacılar
- Hasançelebi
- Haydaroğlu
- İğdir
- Işıklı
- Karadere
- Karaköçek
- Karapınar
- Karşıyaka
- Karslılar
- Kavacık
- Kocaözü
- Köprülü Mehmet Paşa
- Köylüköyü
- Kozdere
- Kurşunlu
- Mimarsinan
- Mollaibrahim
- Ş. Fethi Akyüz
- Salıcık
- Saraylı
- Sarıkız
- Sazlıca
- Söğüt
- Taşbaşı
- Taşoluk
- Turgut Özal
- Uğurlu
- Yağca
- Yayladamı
- Yeni
- Yeşilkale
- Yeşilköy
- Yeşilpınar
- Yukarıselimli

== Notable people ==
- Mehmet Ali Ağca
- Takiyettin Mengüşoğlu
- Oktay Kaynarca
