= Yoncalı, Arguvan =

Village in Turkey

Yoncalı
- Neighbourhood
- Location in Turkey
- Coordinates: 39.010°N 38.255°E
- Country: Turkey
- Province: Malatya
- District: Arguvan
- Population (2025): 56
- Time zone: UTC+3 (TRT)

Yoncalı (Kurdish: Bîrîk) is a neighbourhood in the municipality and district of Arguvan, Malatya Province in Turkey. It is populated by Kurds of the Atma tribe and had a population of 56 in 2025.
