= Dedekargın, Yazıhan =

Village in Turkey

Dedekargın
- Neighbourhood
- Location in Turkey
- Coordinates: 38.496°N 38.321°E
- Country: Turkey
- Province: Malatya
- District: Yazıhan
- Population (2025): 186
- Time zone: UTC+3 (TRT)

Dedekargın is a neighbourhood in the municipality and district of Yazıhan, Malatya Province in Turkey. It is populated by Kurds and Turks and had a population of 186 in 2025.
