= Çığlık, Doğanşehir =

Village in Turkey

Çığlık
- Neighbourhood
- Location in Turkey
- Coordinates: 38.115°N 37.917°E
- Country: Turkey
- Province: Malatya
- District: Doğanşehir
- Population (2025): 767
- Time zone: UTC+3 (TRT)

Çığlık (Kurdish: Çilix) is a neighbourhood in the municipality and district of Doğanşehir, Malatya Province in Turkey. It is populated by Kurds of the Balan tribe and had a population of 767 in 2025.
