= Gürobası, Doğanşehir =

Village in Turkey

Gürobası
- Neighbourhood
- Location in Turkey
- Coordinates: 38.093°N 37.958°E
- Country: Turkey
- Province: Malatya
- District: Doğanşehir
- Population (2025): 334
- Time zone: UTC+3 (TRT)

Gürobası is a neighbourhood in the municipality and district of Doğanşehir, Malatya Province in Turkey. It is populated by Kurds of the Balan tribe and had a population of 334 in 2025.
