= Kavacık, Hekimhan =

Village in Turkey

Karapınar
- Neighbourhood
- Location in Turkey
- Coordinates: 38.777°N 38.139°E
- Country: Turkey
- Province: Malatya
- District: Hekimhan
- Population (2025): 46
- Time zone: UTC+3 (TRT)

Kavacık is a neighbourhood in the municipality and district of Hekimhan, Malatya Province in Turkey. It is populated by Kurds of the Dirêjan tribe and had a population of 46 in 2025.
