= Karahüyük, Arguvan =

Village in Turkey

Karahüyük
- Neighbourhood
- Location in Turkey
- Coordinates: 38.814°N 38.316°E
- Country: Turkey
- Province: Malatya
- District: Arguvan
- Population (2025): 205
- Time zone: UTC+3 (TRT)

Karahüyük is a neighbourhood in the municipality and district of Arguvan, Malatya Province in Turkey. It is populated by Turks of the and had a population of 205 in 2025.
