= Güveçli, Arguvan =

Village in Turkey

Güveçli
- Neighbourhood
- Location in Turkey
- Coordinates: 38.784°N 38.209°E
- Country: Turkey
- Province: Malatya
- District: Arguvan
- Population (2025): 121
- Time zone: UTC+3 (TRT)

Güveçli (Kurdish: Maman) is a neighbourhood in the municipality and district of Arguvan, Malatya Province in Turkey. It is populated by Kurds of the Dirêjan tribe and had a population of 121 in 2025.
