= Kuruttaş, Arguvan =

Village in Turkey

Kuruttaş
- Neighbourhood
- Location in Turkey
- Coordinates: 38.885°N 38.201°E
- Country: Turkey
- Province: Malatya
- District: Arguvan
- Population (2025): 87
- Time zone: UTC+3 (TRT)

Kuruttaş (Kurdish: Reşan) is a neighbourhood in the municipality and district of Arguvan, Malatya Province in Turkey. It is populated by Kurds of the Atma tribe and had a population of 87 in 2025.
