= Sinanlı, Yazıhan =

Village in Turkey

Sinanlı
- Neighbourhood
- Location in Turkey
- Coordinates: 38.539°N 38.287°E
- Country: Turkey
- Province: Malatya
- District: Yazıhan
- Population (2025): 429
- Time zone: UTC+3 (TRT)

Sinanlı is a neighbourhood in the municipality and district of Yazıhan, Malatya Province in Turkey. It is populated by Kurds of the Herdî tribe and had a population of 429 in 2025.
