= Takiyettin Mengüşoğlu =

Turkish philosopher

Takiyettin Mengusoglu (1905–1984) was a Turkish philosopher.

Mengusoglu was born in Malatya, Turkey. After finishing high school, he went to Germany and became a student of Nicolai Hartmann. He was known as Takiyettin Temuralp at that time and published Über die grenzen der erkennbarkeit bei Husserl und Scheler in German. He is the author of the university level textbook Felsefeye Giriş (Introduction to Philosophy).

Mengüşoğlu founded a new school of anthropology, which he called ontological anthropology. This anthropology deals with man not through any conceptualization but through "his concrete biopsychic wholeness". He believed that this new anthropology would be more suitable for approaching and solving concrete problems in the human world.
