= Girmana, Hekimhan =

Village in Turkey

Girmana
- Neighbourhood
- Location in Turkey
- Coordinates: 38.697°N 37.967°E
- Country: Turkey
- Province: Malatya
- District: Hekimhan
- Population (2025): 816
- Time zone: UTC+3 (TRT)

Girmana is a neighbourhood in the municipality and district of Hekimhan, Malatya Province in Turkey. It is populated by Kurds and Turks and had a population of 816 in 2025.
