= Karababa, Arguvan =

Village in Turkey

Karababa
- Neighbourhood
- Location in Turkey
- Coordinates: 38.641°N 38.334°E
- Country: Turkey
- Province: Malatya
- District: Arguvan
- Population (2025): 47
- Time zone: UTC+3 (TRT)

Karababa (Kurdish: Mamahar) is a neighbourhood in the municipality and district of Arguvan, Malatya Province in Turkey. It is populated by Kurds of the Zeyve tribe and had a population of 47 in 2025.
