= Hasırcılar, Battalgazi =

Village in Turkey

Hasırcılar
- Neighbourhood
- Location in Turkey
- Coordinates: 38.474°N 38.336°E
- Country: Turkey
- Province: Malatya
- District: Battalgazi
- Population (2025): 1,445
- Time zone: UTC+3 (TRT)

Hasırcılar is a neighbourhood in the municipality and district of Battalgazi, Malatya Province in Turkey. It is populated by Kurds had a population of 1,445 in 2025.
