= Kömüşhan, Yazıhan =

Village in Turkey

Kömüşhan
- Neighbourhood
- Location in Turkey
- Coordinates: 38.513°N 38.189°E
- Country: Turkey
- Province: Malatya
- District: Yazıhan
- Population (2025): 683
- Time zone: UTC+3 (TRT)

Kömüşhan is a neighbourhood in the municipality and district of Yazıhan, Malatya Province in Turkey. It is populated by Kurds of the Dirêjan tribe and had a population of 683 in 2025.
