= Boğazgören, Hekimhan =

Village in Turkey

Boğazgören
- Neighbourhood
- Location in Turkey
- Coordinates: 38.885°N 37.917°E
- Country: Turkey
- Province: Malatya
- District: Hekimhan
- Population (2025): 128
- Time zone: UTC+3 (TRT)

Boğazgören is a neighbourhood in the municipality and district of Hekimhan, Malatya Province in Turkey. It is populated by Turks and had a population of 128 in 2025.
