= List of largest cities and towns in Turkey =

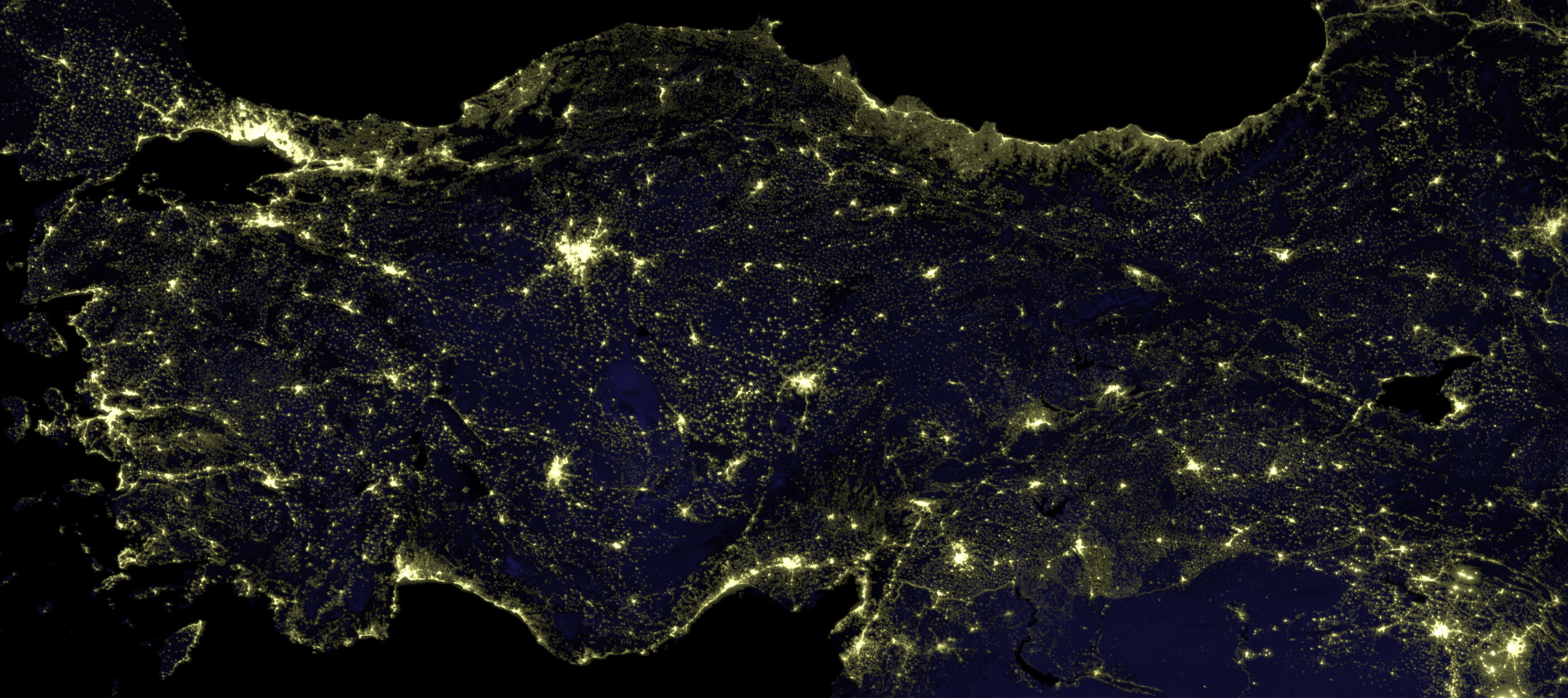
Night lights map of Turkey in 2025

This is a list of the largest cities and towns in Turkey by population, which includes cities and towns that are provincial capitals or have a population of at least 7,000.

The total population of Turkey is 86,092,168 according to the 2025 end of the year estimate (Note: excluding Syrian refugees in temporary protection status (2,347,756 people as of the date)), making it the 18th most populated country in the world.

Since there are no defined city borders in Turkey, it is hard to estimate the exact populations of urban areas. However a rough estimate for the top cities is as follows. (Note: including Syrian refugees in temporary protection status)

- Istanbul, Turkey's economic and cultural center, is the largest city of the country with a population of c. 17 million. (Note: including Gebze, Çayırova, Darıca, and Dilovası districts of Kocaeli Province which are conurbated to Istanbul city) It is the 26th most populous urban agglomeration in the world and the second in Europe, after Moscow. It is also one of the world cities with most international tourist arrivals, accommodating an annual tourist population more than its residents.
- Ankara, the capital city of Turkey and its second-largest city, has a population of c. 5.5 million.
- İzmir, Turkey's third-largest city, has a population of c. 3.5 million.
- Bursa, fourth-largest city of the country, has a population of c. 2.5 million.
- Gaziantep, Turkey's fifth-largest city, has a population of over 2 million.
- Adana follows the list with a population of almost 2 million.
- Antalya, Konya, Kayseri, Kocaeli, Mersin, Diyarbakır, and Şanlıurfa are other cities with more than 1 million inhabitants. Antalya is another tourist attraction for international visitors, being in top 10 worldwide along Istanbul.

== Cities and towns with more than 7,000 inhabitants ==
Cities and towns with a population of over 7,000 inhabitants according to the Turkish Statistical Institute are listed in the following table along with the results of the censuses from October 1990 and October 2000, and the provinces in which the cities are located. The number of inhabitants refers to the actual city, not the city's greater metropolitan area.

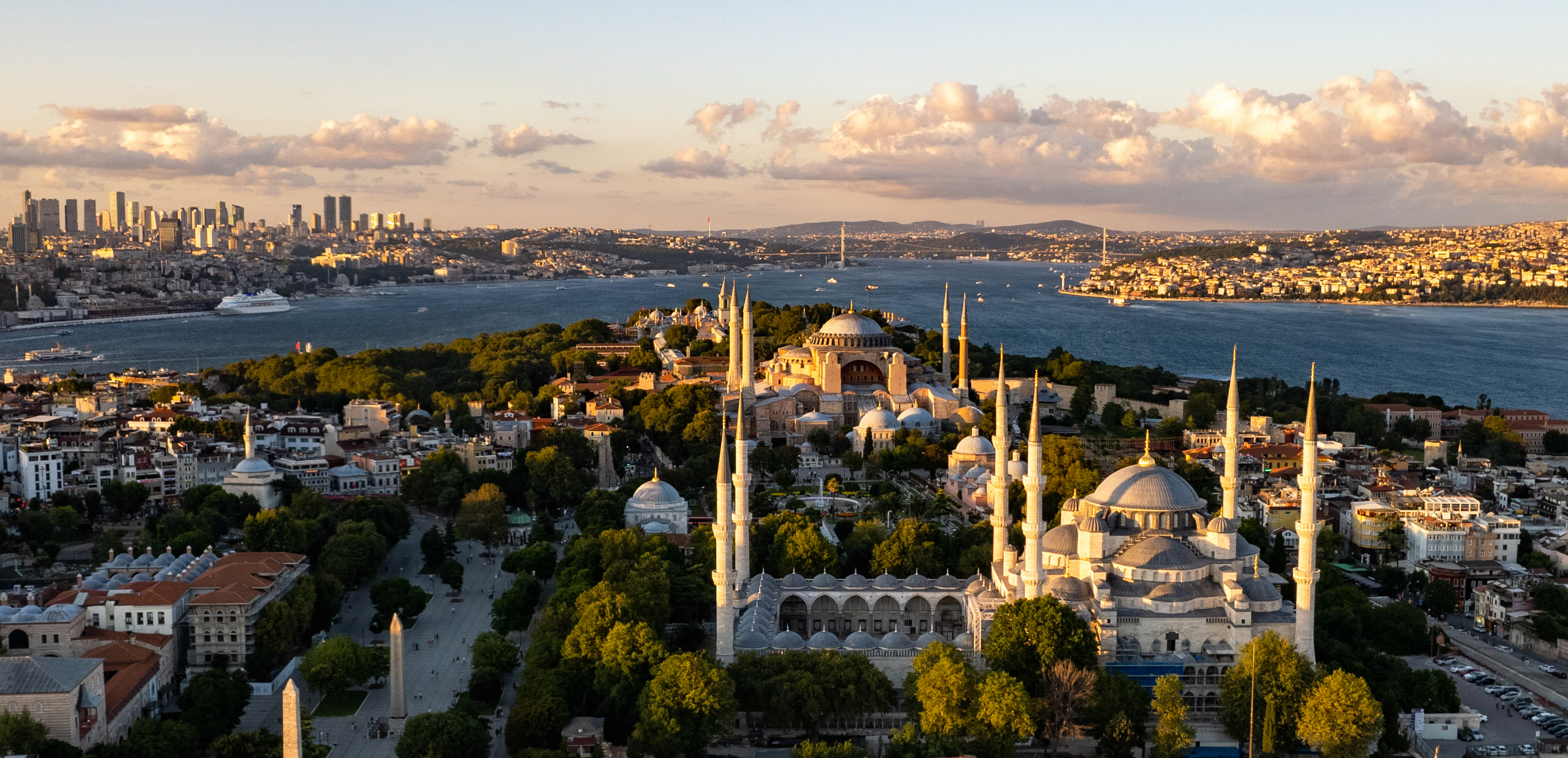
Istanbul

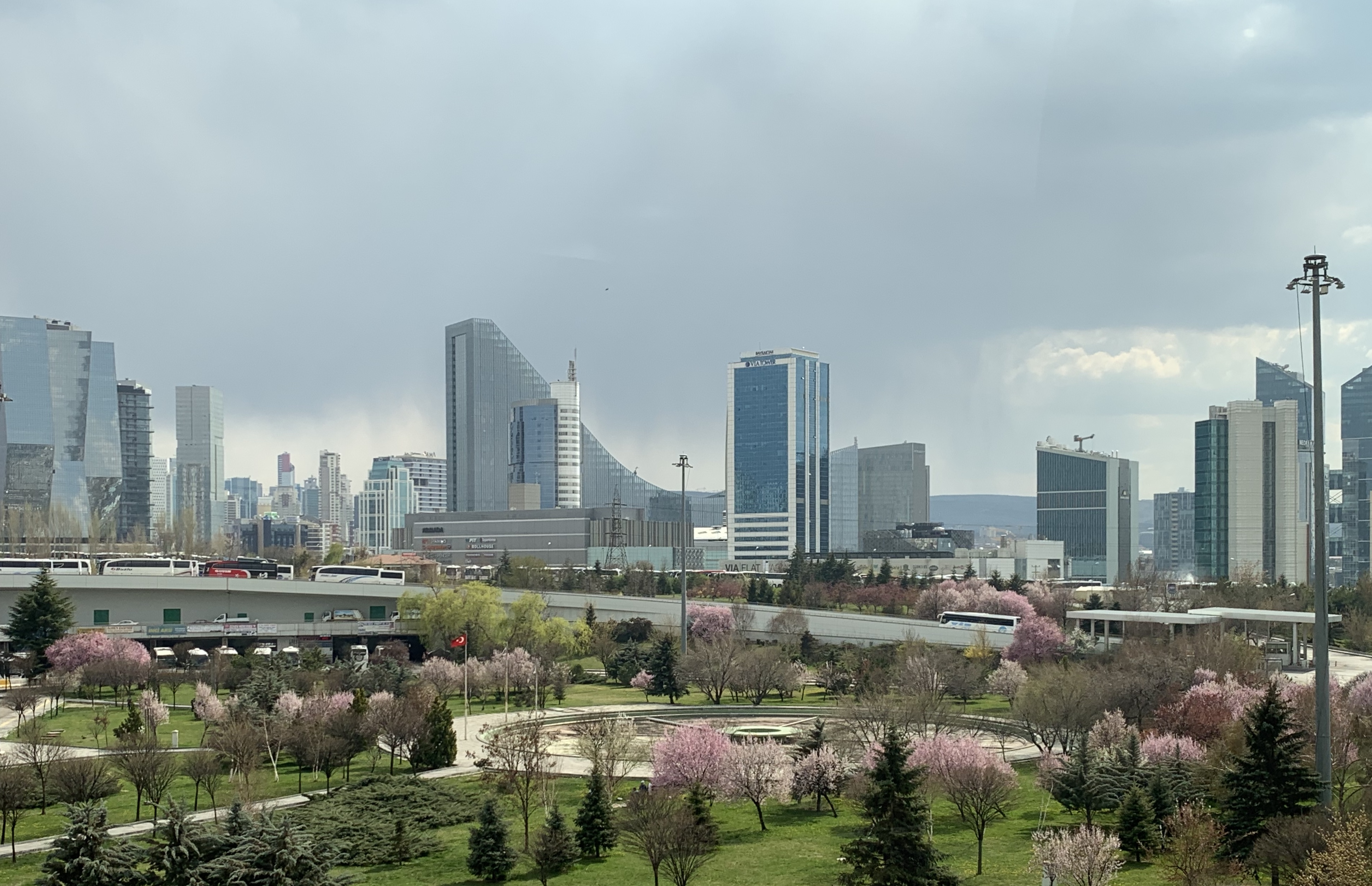
Ankara

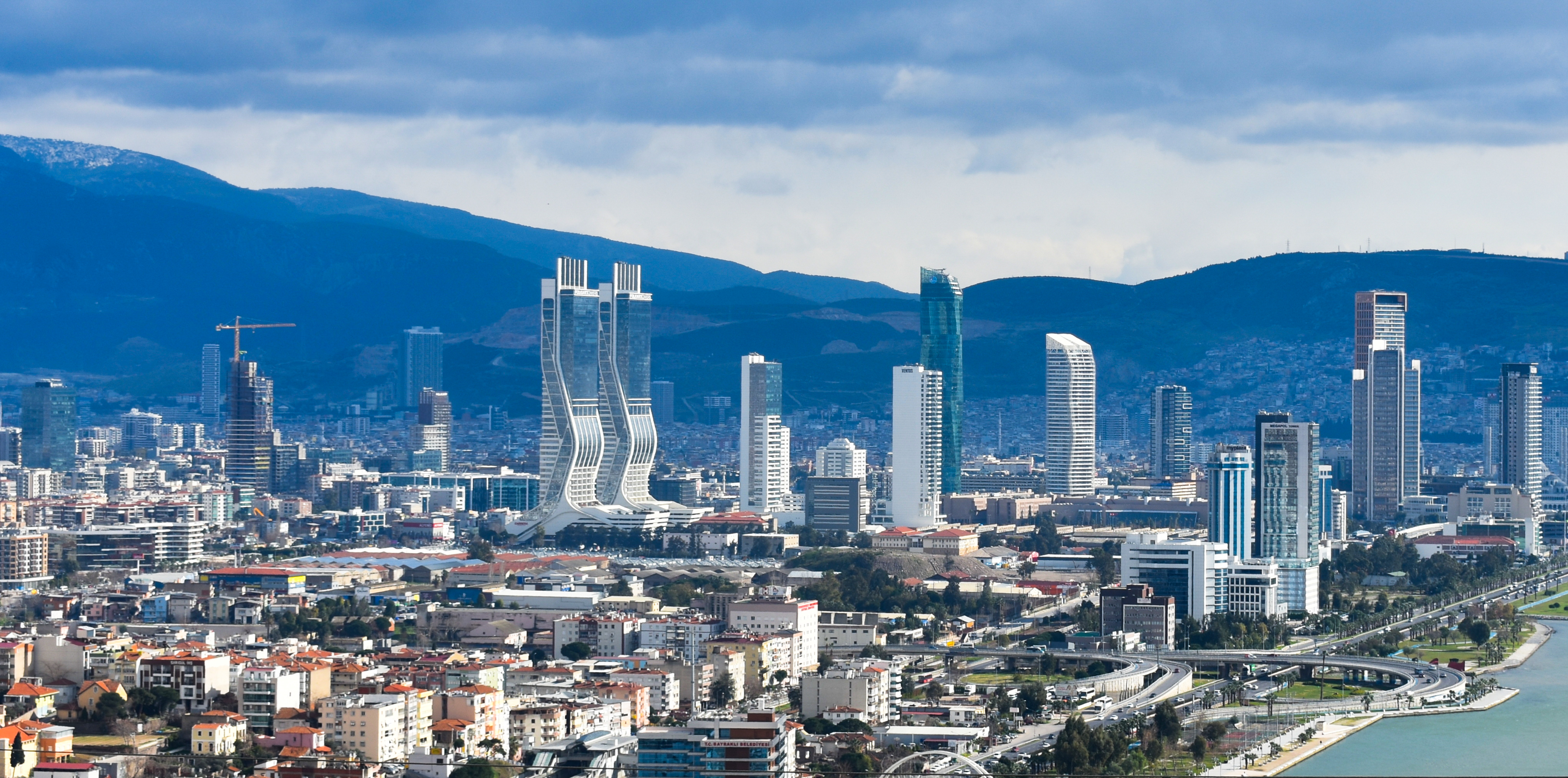
İzmir

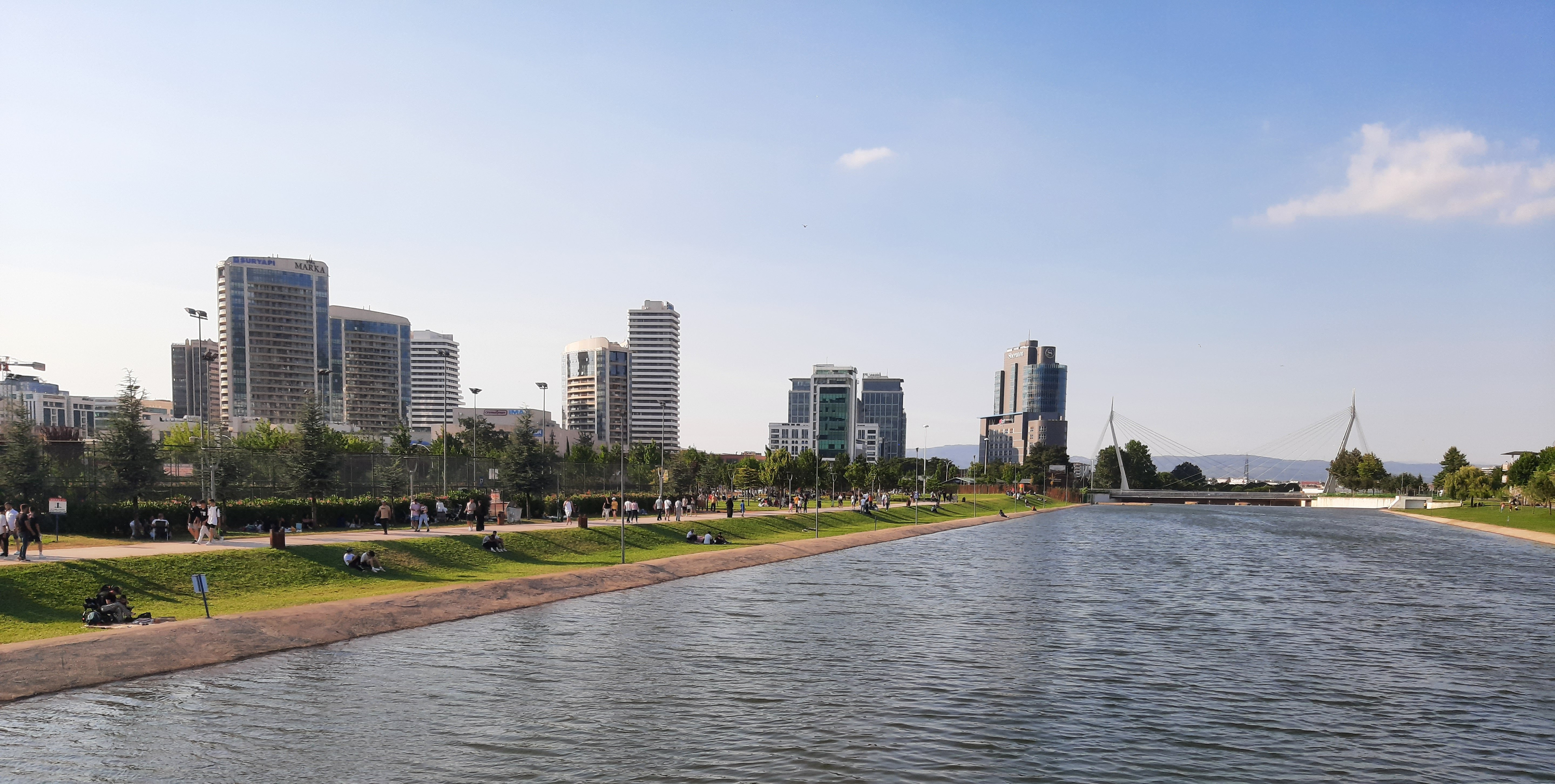
Bursa

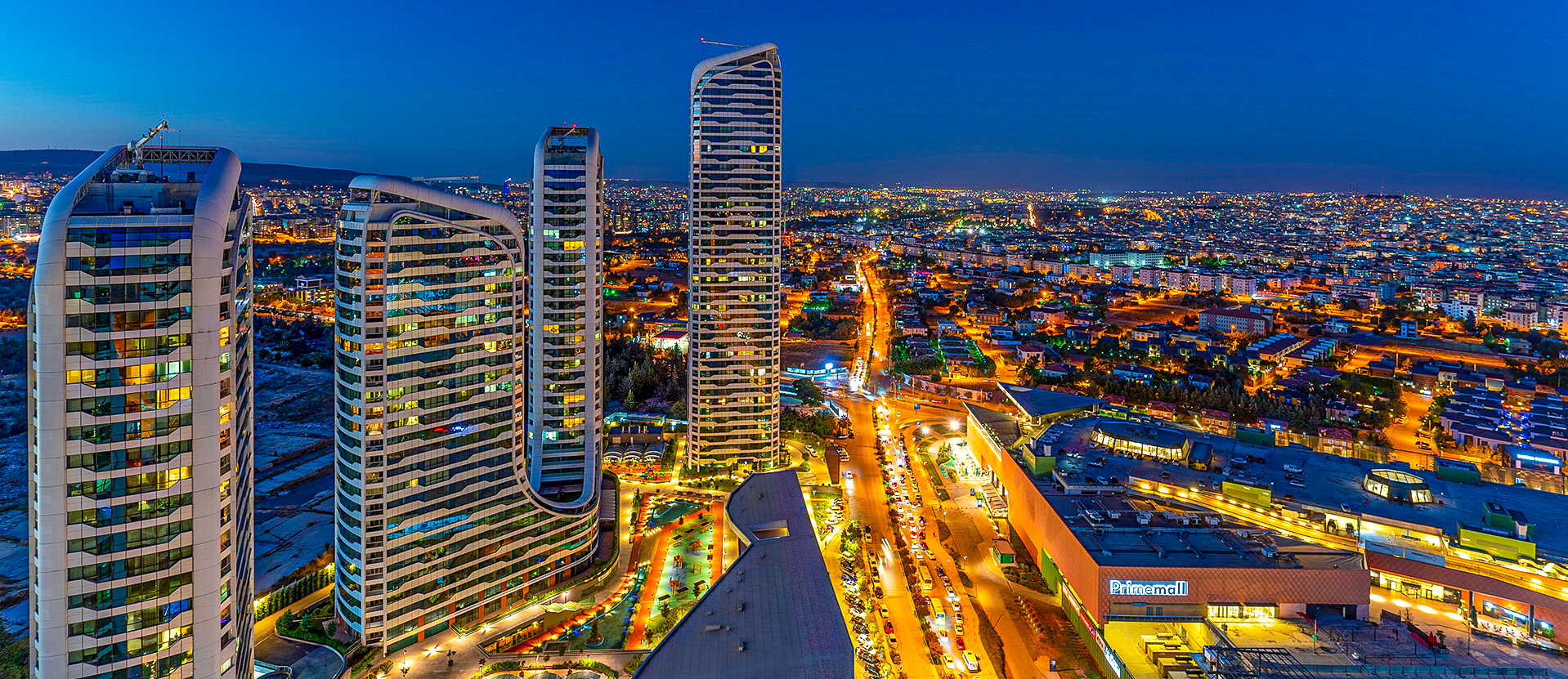
Gaziantep

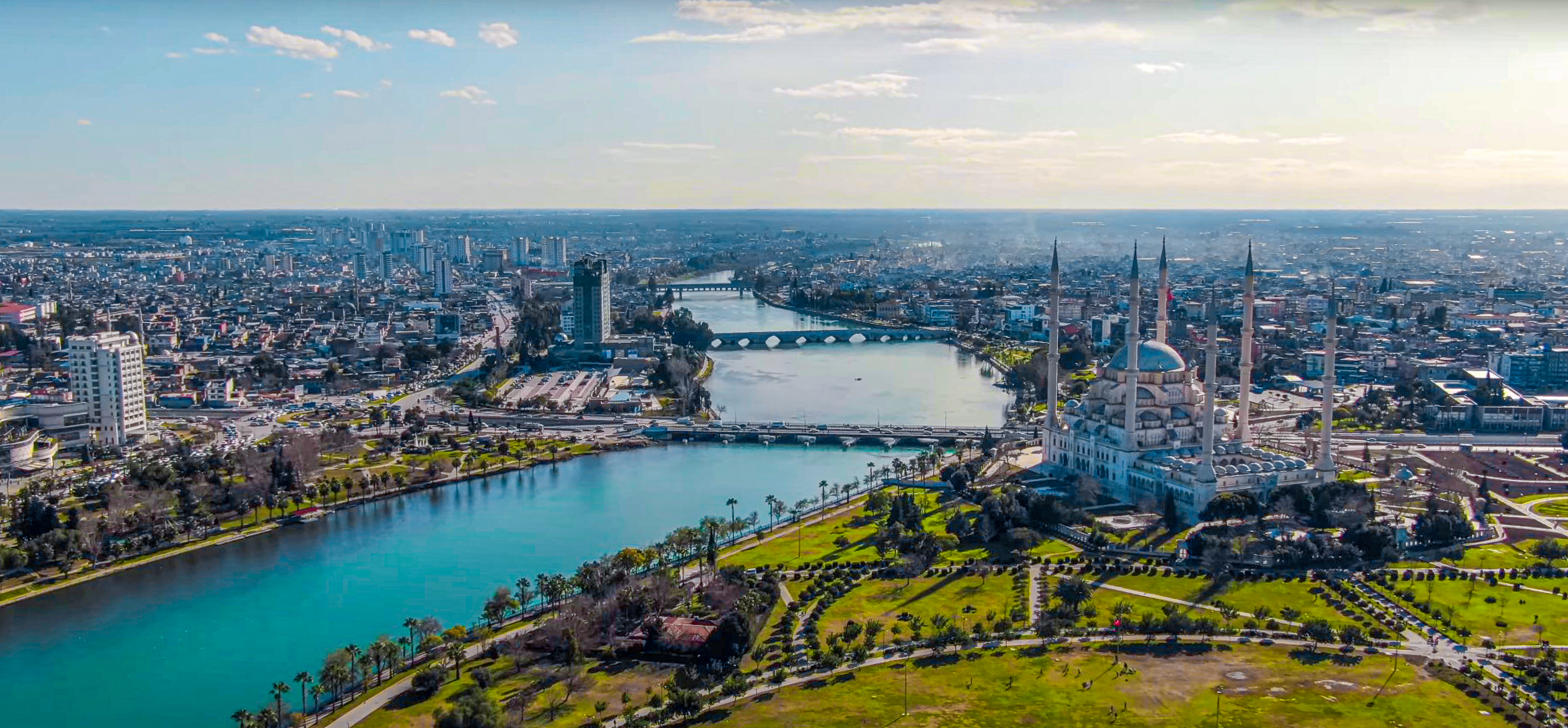
Adana

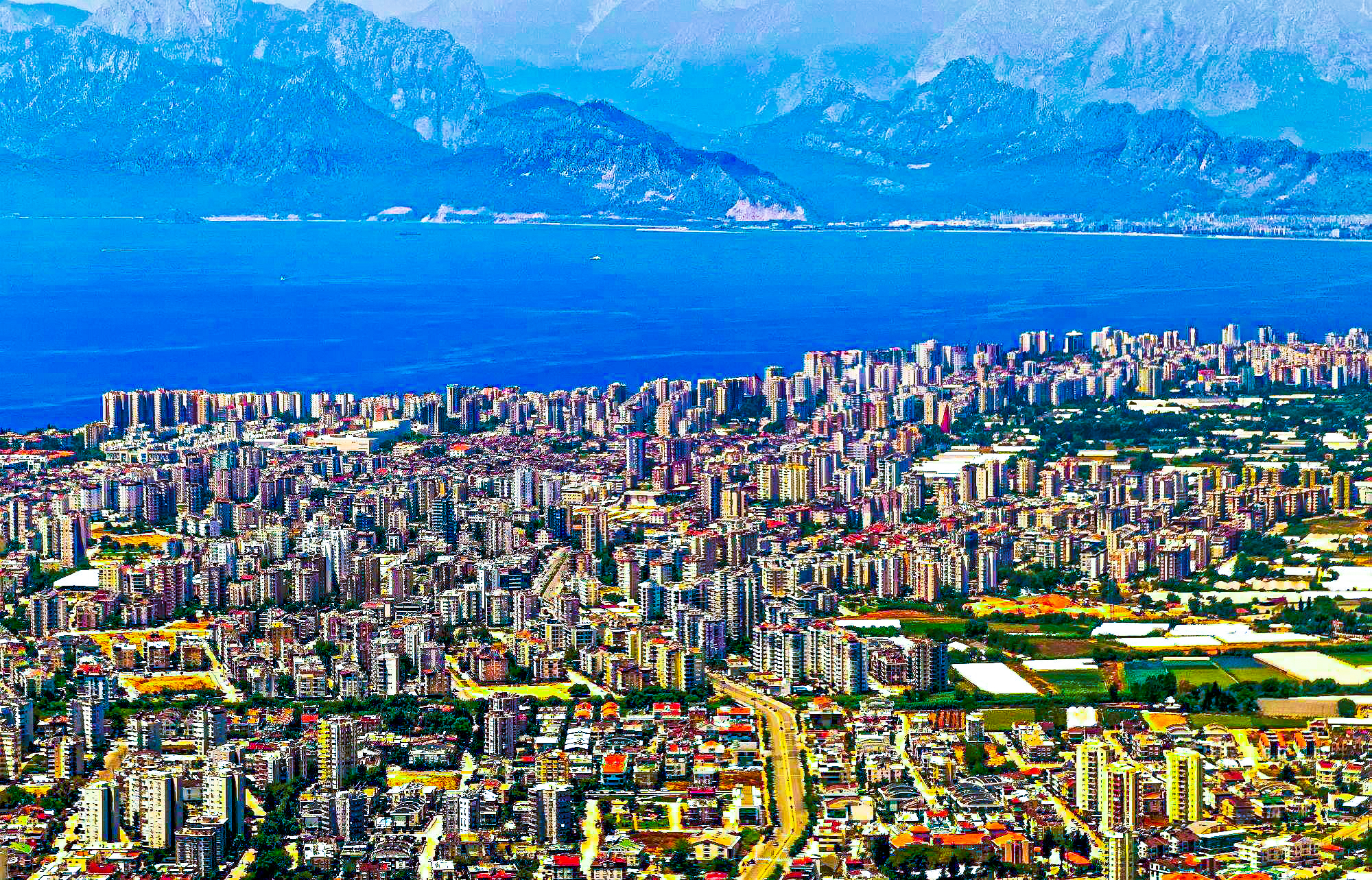
Antalya

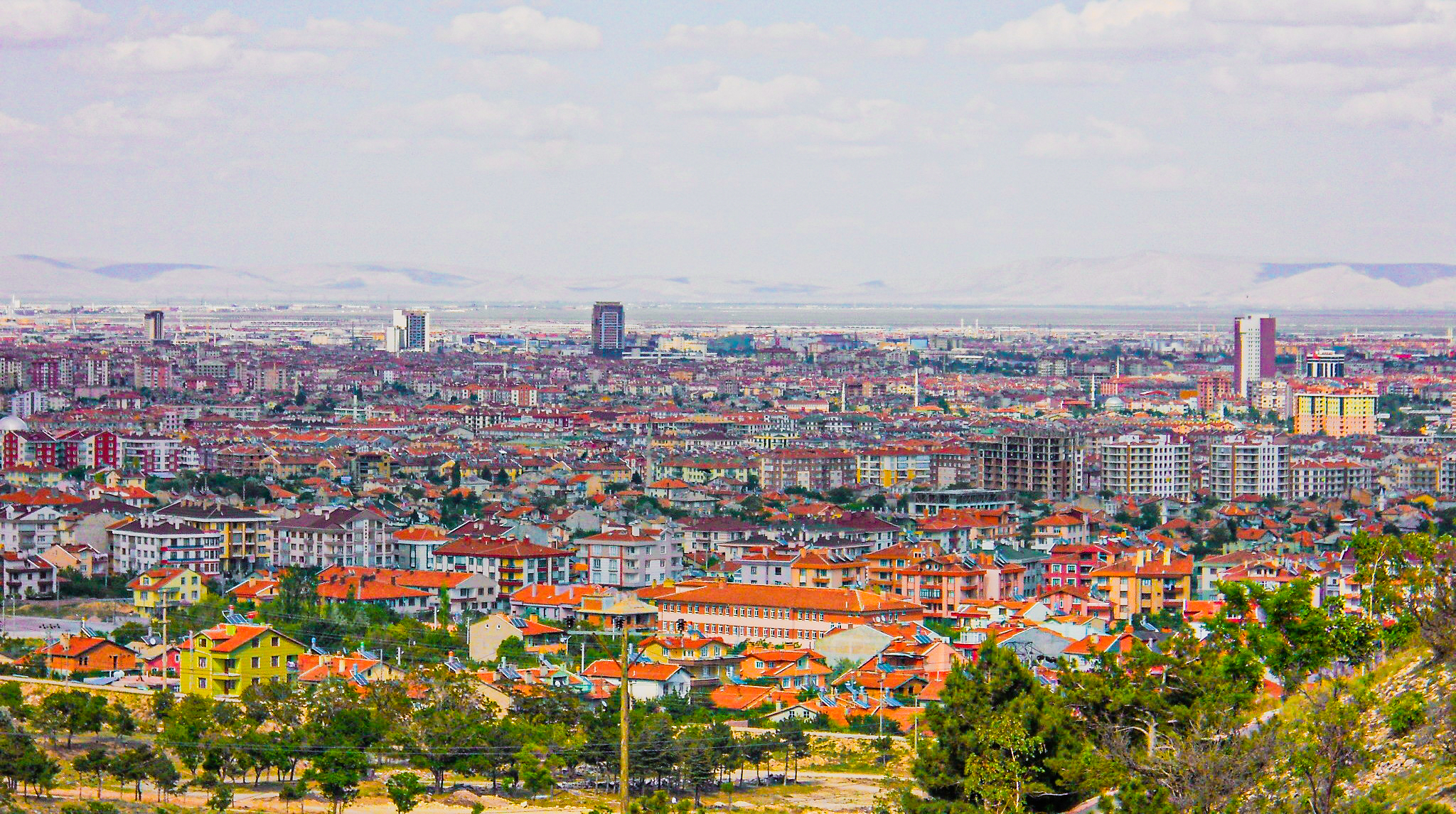
Konya

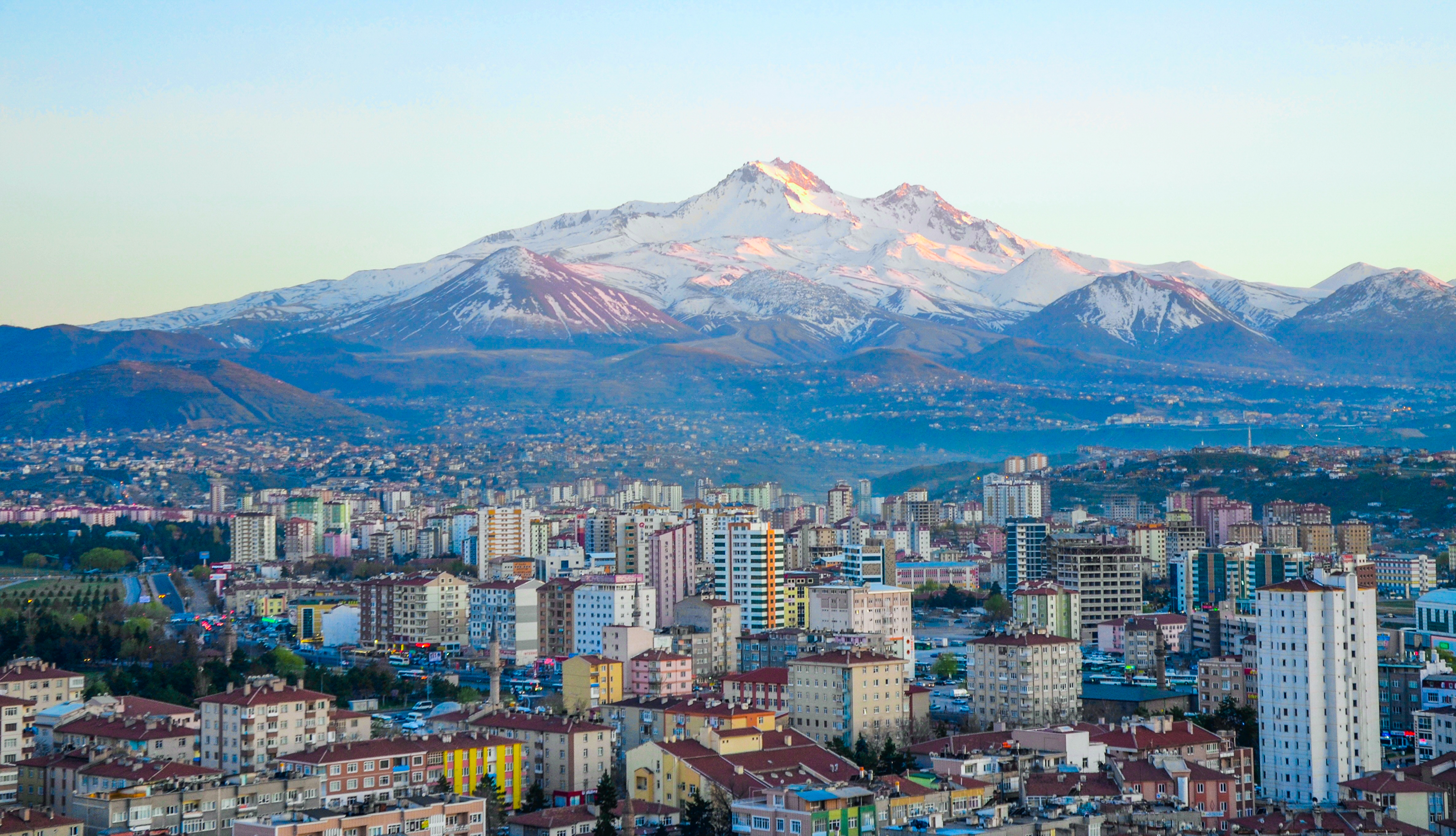
Kayseri

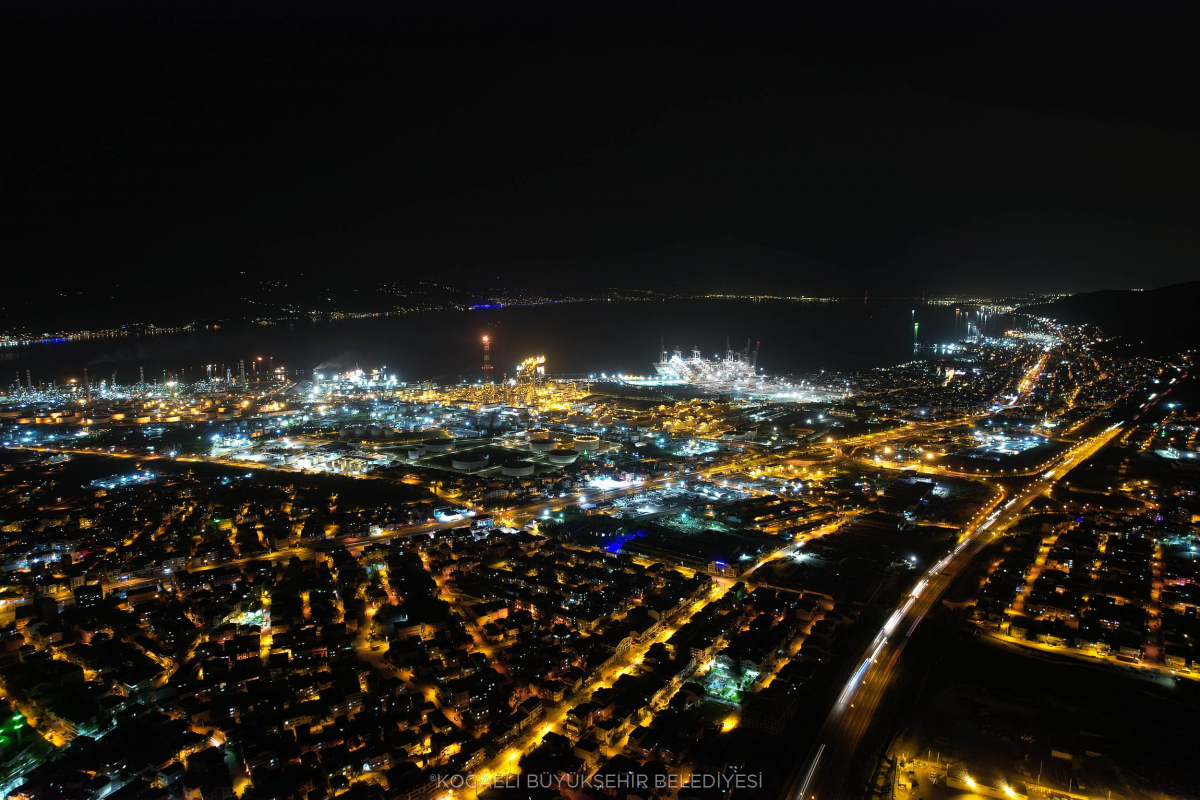
Kocaeli

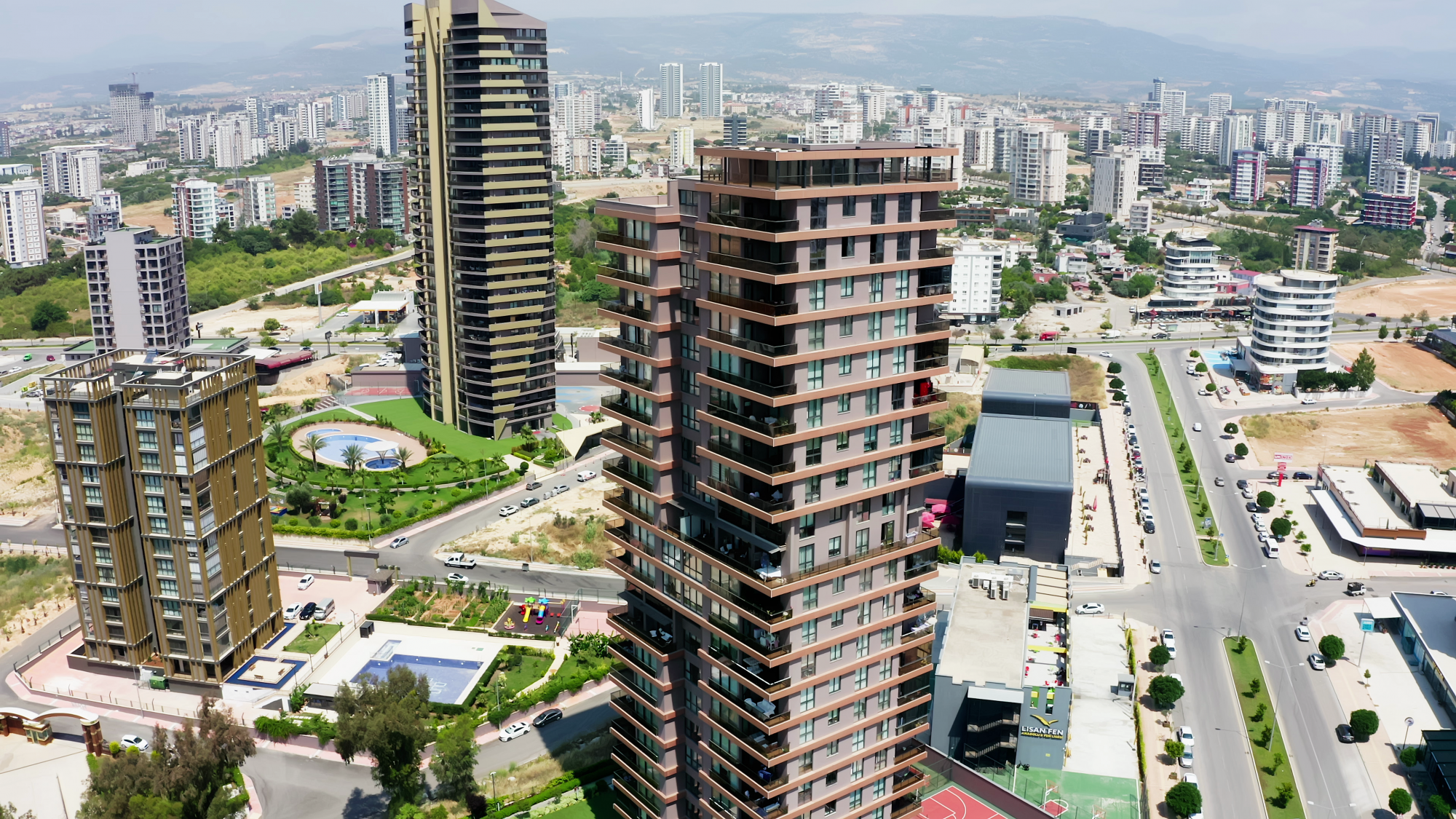
Mersin

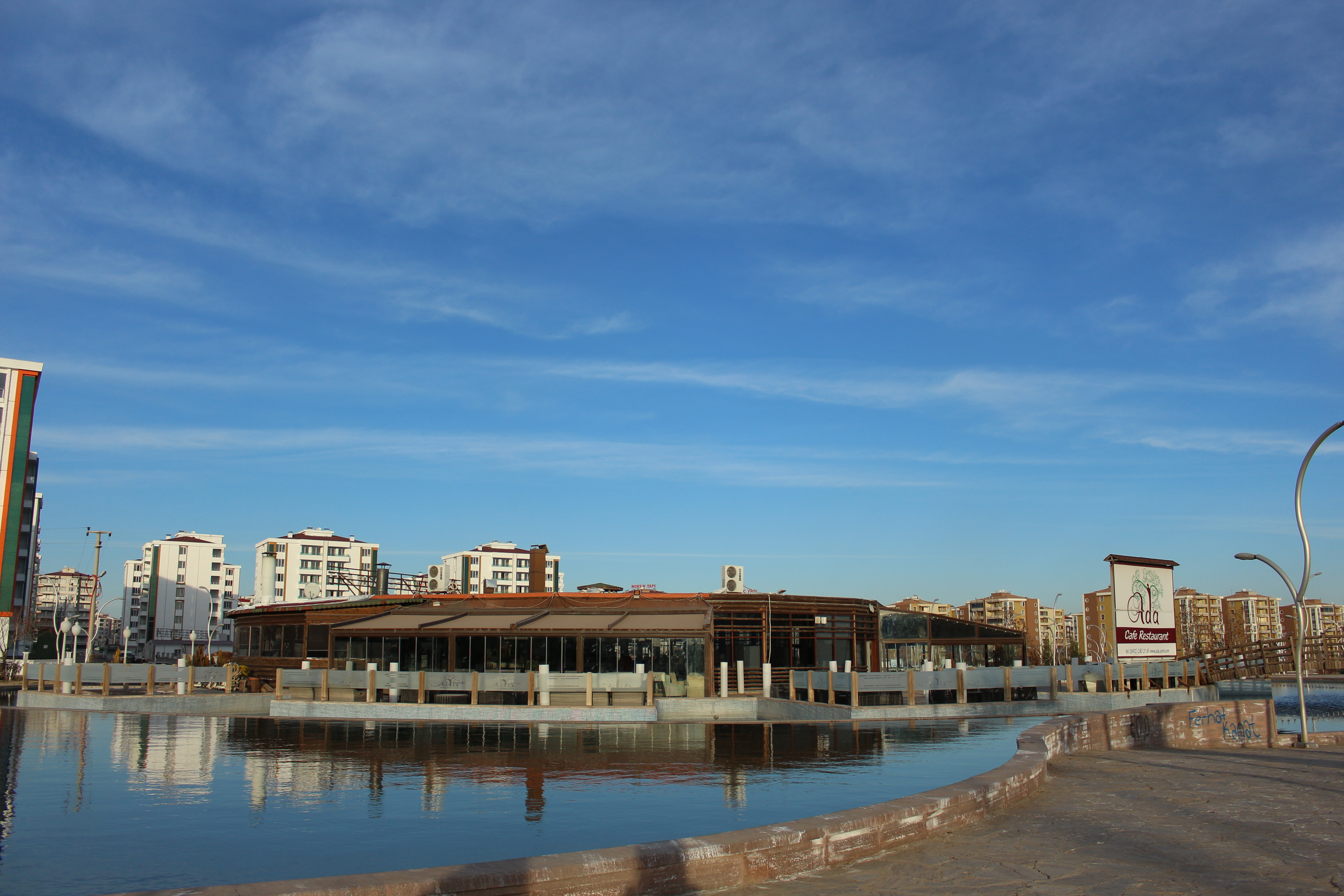
Diyarbakır

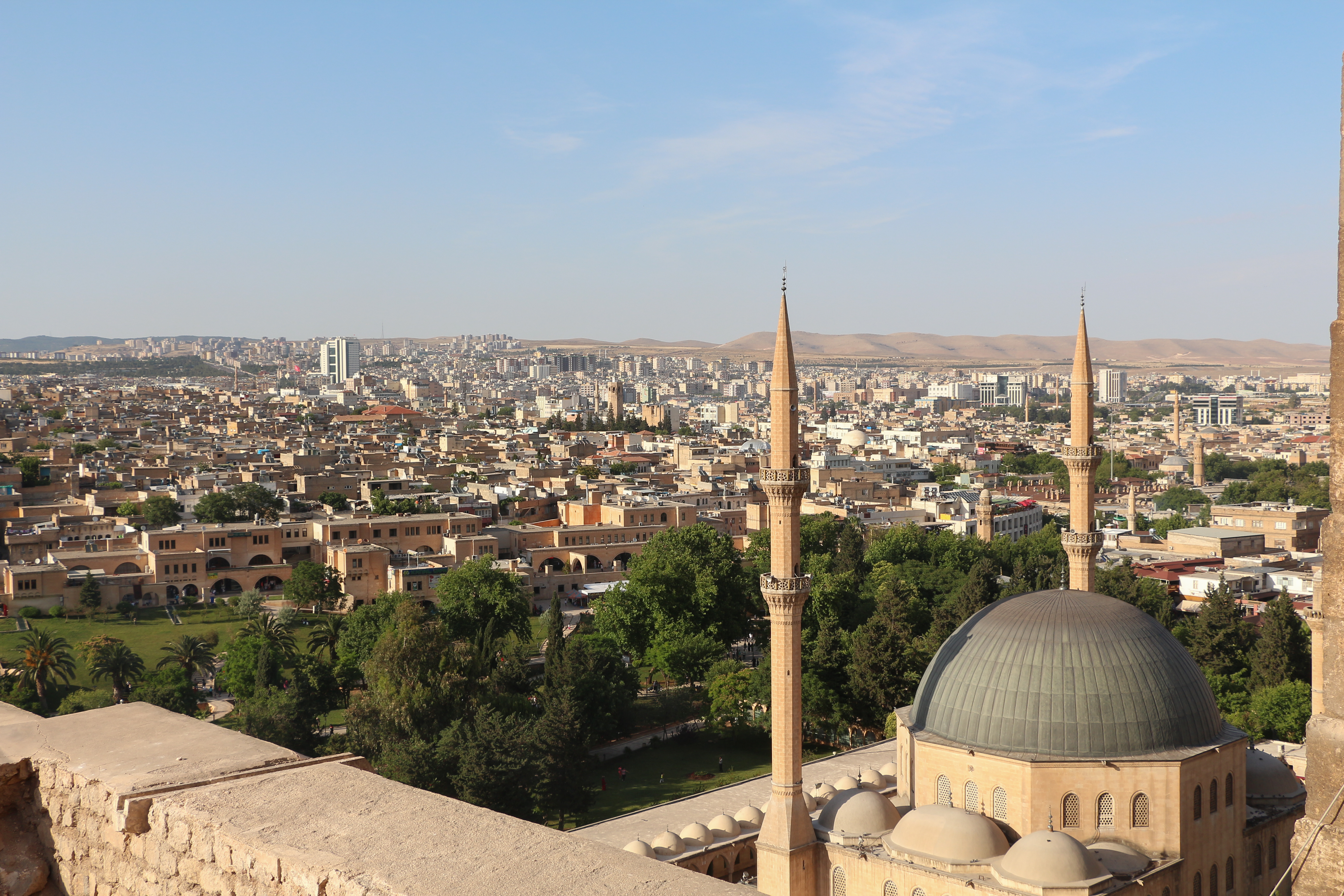
Şanlıurfa

Provinces of Turkey
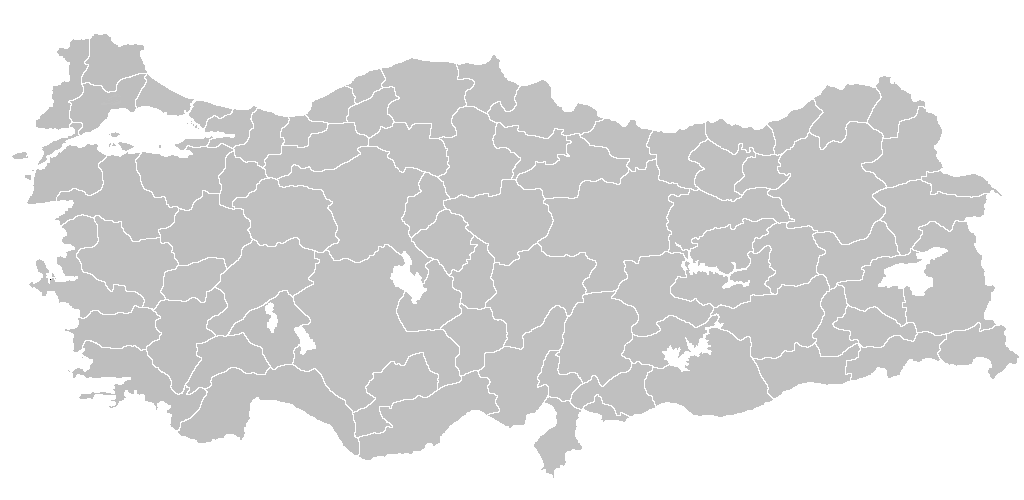

Rank	City or Town	1990 Census	2000 Census	2007 Estimate	2008 Estimate	2015 Estimate	Province (İl)
1	Istanbul	6,629,431	8,803,468	10,861,463	10,878,360	14,025,646	Istanbul
2	Ankara	2,583,963	3,203,362	3,842,737	3,894,182	4,587,558	Ankara
3	İzmir	1,758,780	2,232,265	2,644,531	2,672,126	2,847,691	İzmir
4	Bursa	834,576	1,194,687	1,537,040	1,589,530	1,854,285	Bursa
5	Adana	916,150	1,130,710	1,506,272	1,517,787	1,563,545	Adana
6	Gaziantep	603,434	853,513	1,192,023	1,235,815	1,495,050	Gaziantep
7	Konya	513,346	742,690	973,791	980,973	1,003,373	Konya
8	Antalya	378,208	603,190	877,945	911,497	955,573	Antalya
9	Kayseri	425,776	536,392	775,594	781,119	911,984	Kayseri
10	Mersin	481,459	633,691	692,300	696,518	842,230	Mersin
11	Eskişehir	413,082	482,793	581,408	599,796	617,215	Eskişehir
12	Diyarbakır	373,810	545,963	613,332	613,821	614,310	Diyarbakır
13	Samsun	322,982	388,509	459,781	461,640	511,601	Samsun
14	Denizli	237,918	357,557	465,947	479,381	492,815	Denizli
15	Şanlıurfa	276,528	385,588	472,238	468,993	465,748	Şanlıurfa
16	Adapazarı	272,039	283,752	382,226	548,120	399,022	Sakarya
17	Malatya	270,412	381,081	419,212	411,181	388,590	Malatya
18	Kahramanmaraş	228,129	326,198	380,805	385,672	384,953	Kahramanmaraş
19	Erzurum	242,391	361,235	361,160	359,752	358,344	Erzurum
20	Van	155,623	284,464	331,986	342,139	352,292	Van
21	Batman	147,347	246,678	293,024	298,342	313,355	Batman
22	Elazığ	204,603	266,495	319,381	312,584	305,787	Elazığ
23	İzmit	190,741	195,699	285,470	287,970	293,339	Kocaeli
24	Manisa	158,928	214,949	281,890	278,967	291,374	Manisa
25	Sivas	223,115	251,776	294,402	288,693	282,984	Sivas
26	Gebze	159,116	253,487	270,614	274,271	282,444	Kocaeli
27	Balıkesir	170,589	215,436	241,404	247,072	259,157	Balıkesir
28	Tarsus	187,508	216,382	229,921	228,471	227,021	Mersin
29	Kütahya	130,944	166,665	212,934	202,118	212,444	Kütahya
30	Trabzon	161,886	214,949	230,693	220,860	211,027	Trabzon
31	Çorum	116,810	161,321	202,322	206,572	210,822	Çorum
32	Çorlu	74,681	141,525	190,792	200,577	210,362	Tekirdağ
33	Adıyaman	100,045	178,538	191,627	193,250	198,433	Adıyaman
34	Osmaniye	122,307	173,977	180,477	189,112	197,747	Osmaniye
35	Kırıkkale	185,431	205,078	193,526	192,341	192,705	Kırıkkale
36	Antakya	123,871	144,910	186,243	188,310	190,377	Hatay
37	Aydın	107,011	143,267	168,216	171,242	179,425	Aydın
38	İskenderun	154,807	159,149	177,294	176,374	175,454	Hatay
39	Uşak	105,270	137,001	172,709	173,053	173,397	Uşak
40	Aksaray	90,698	129,949	153,570	161,323	171,423	Aksaray
41	Afyon	95,643	128,516	159,967	163,207	170,455	Afyon
42	Isparta	112,117	148,496	184,735	175,815	166,895	Isparta
43	İnegöl	73,258	119,710	154,698	158,575	162,452	Bursa
44	Tekirdağ	80,442	107,191	133,322	137,962	142,602	Tekirdağ
45	Edirne	102,345	119,298	136,070	138,222	140,374	Edirne
46	Darıca	53,559	85,818	109,580	135,966	140,302	Kocaeli
47	Ordu	102,107	112,525	134,005	132,280	135,878	Ordu
48	Karaman	76,525	105,384	122,809	127,192	132,064	Karaman
49	Gölcük	104,234	103,996	127,206	130,141	129,713	Kocaeli
50	Siirt	68,320	98,281	117,599	122,463	127,327	Siirt
51	Körfez	78,707	99,322	119,383	125,012	126,616	Kocaeli
52	Kızıltepe	60,134	113,143	127,148	125,455	123,762	Mardin
53	Düzce	65,209	56,649	117,605	119,410	121,215	Düzce
54	Tokat	83,058	113,100	127,988	124,496	121,004	Tokat
55	Bolu	61,509	84,565	120,188	120,001	120,021	Bolu
56	Derince	66,141	93,997	113,991	118,130	119,704	Kocaeli
57	Turgutlu	73,634	93,727	111,166	114,483	117,800	Manisa
58	Bandırma	77,444	97,419	110,248	111,494	112,740	Balıkesir
59	Nazilli	80,277	105,665	105,675	108,056	110,437	Aydın
60	Kırşehir	73,538	88,105	99,832	101,333	105,826	Kırşehir
61	Niğde	55,035	78,088	100,418	100,418	105,702	Niğde
62	Zonguldak	117,975	104,276	107,354	105,979	104,604	Zonguldak
63	Ceyhan	85,308	108,602	103,800	102,040	104,542	Adana
64	Karabük	105,373	100,749	108,994	106,148	103,302	Karabük
65	Siverek	63,049	126,820	108,094	105,475	102,856	Şanlıurfa
66	Akhisar	73,944	81,510	96,393	99,423	102,453	Manisa
67	Lüleburgaz	52,384	79,002	95,466	98,128	100,790	Kırklareli
68	Karadeniz Ereğli	66,859	79,486	94,736	98,545	99,298	Zonguldak
69	Ağrı	58,038	79,764	97,839	91,817	99,276	Ağrı
70	Polatlı	60,158	79,992	91,166	89,024	96,812	Ankara
71	Rize	52,743	78,144	94,800	91,904	96,503	Rize
72	Salihli	70,861	83,137	96,594	96,449	96,304	Manisa
73	Ereğli	74,283	82,633	94,542	93,161	95,058	Konya
74	Cizre	50,023	69,591	90,477	94,076	94,835	Şırnak
74	Nizip	58,604	71,629	91,486	93,101	94,835	Gaziantep
76	Çanakkale	53,995	75,180	86,544	90,653	94,762	Çanakkale
77	Yalova	65,823	70,118	87,372	91,047	94,722	Yalova
78	Alanya	52,460	88,346	91,713	92,223	94,316	Antalya
79	Giresun	67,604	83,636	89,241	90,034	90,827	Giresun
80	Viranşehir	57,461	121,382	100,929	87,605	89,940	Şanlıurfa
81	Bingöl	41,590	68,876	86,511	86,113	89,224	Bingöl
82	Amasya	57,087	74,393	85,851	82,200	86,667	Amasya
83	Kastamonu	51,560	64,606	80,582	80,946	86,085	Kastamonu
84	Elbistan	54,741	71,500	82,238	81,239	85,642	Kahramanmaraş
85	Erzincan	91,772	107,175	86,779	86,051	85,323	Erzincan
86	Nevşehir	52,719	67,864	81,688	81,899	84,631	Nevşehir
87	Nusaybin	49,671	74,110	88,296	84,372	83,832	Mardin
88	Kartepe	42,080	64,262	74,774	80,221	82,551	Kocaeli
89	Çayırova	7,800	24,825	45,085	78,430	82,494	Kocaeli
90	Mardin	53,005	65,072	82,134	81,269	82,449	Mardin
91	Manavgat	38,498	71,679	75,163	76,605	81,903	Antalya
92	Bafra	65,600	83,733	85,325	82,593	79,861	Samsun
93	Kilis	84,077	77,670	77,706	78,698	79,690	Kilis
94	Kadirli	55,061	65,227	77,379	76,976	78,964	Osmaniye
95	Kars	78,455	78,473	76,992	75,291	76,729	Kars
96	Iğdır	38,917	59,880	75,927	75,824	75,721	Iğdır
97	Ünye	45,716	61,552	72,867	72,080	74,806	Ordu
98	Kozan	54,451	75,833	72,463	72,727	74,521	Adana
99	Soma	49,977	60,674	70,683	73,027	74,158	Manisa
100	Silopi	23,430	51,199	70,670	73,603	73,400	Şırnak
101	Ödemiş	51,620	61,896	71,219	71,480	73,330	İzmir
102	Muş	44,019	67,927	70,509	69,507	72,774	Muş
103	Burdur	56,432	63,363	70,157	66,182	71,611	Burdur
104	Yozgat	50,335	73,930	72,183	71,768	71,353	Yozgat
105	Fethiye	37,466	50,689	66,271	68,285	70,299	Muğla
106	Erciş	40,481	70,881	77,464	73,733	70,002	Van
107	Çerkezköy	23,102	41,638	60,907	67,617	69,875	Tekirdağ
108	Dörtyol	47,144	53,597	66,082	67,430	68,778	Hatay
109	Çankırı	45,496	62,508	68,596	67,588	66,580	Çankırı
110	Kırıkhan	68,601	63,615	70,543	68,212	65,881	Hatay
111	Söke	50,866	62,384	66,156	65,974	65,792	Aydın
112	Kırklareli	43,017	53,221	59,970	61,880	64,265	Kırklareli
113	Hakkâri	30,407	58,145	57,954	60,891	63,828	Hakkâri
114	Şırnak	25,059	52,743	54,302	59,435	63,664	Şırnak
115	Doğubayazıt	35,213	56,261	69,414	66,423	63,432	Ağrı
116	Başiskele	31,167	49,855	59,993	61,720	62,663	Kocaeli
117	Kuşadası	31,911	47,661	54,663	58,650	62,637	Aydın
118	Ergani	37,365	47,333	61,973	62,287	62,601	Diyarbakır
119	Tavşanlı	38,214	47,224	61,841	62,040	62,239	Kütahya
120	Muğla	35,605	43,845	52,918	56,619	61,550	Muğla
121	Turhal	69,079	95,536	63,181	62,352	61,523	Tokat
122	Yüksekova	28,909	59,662	59,410	60,296	61,182	Hakkâri
123	Tatvan	54,071	66,748	55,033	57,976	60,919	Bitlis
124	Reyhanlı	42,451	52,135	60,073	60,418	60,763	Hatay
125	Kahta	42,183	60,689	59,570	59,665	59,760	Adıyaman
126	Akşehir	51,746	60,226	63,472	60,765	58,058	Konya
127	Bergama	42,554	52,173	58,212	57,947	57,682	İzmir
128	Erbaa	33,554	45,595	56,810	57,210	57,610	Tokat
129	Bozüyük	33,162	47,469	54,422	55,985	57,548	Bilecik
130	Çarşamba	38,863	49,189	60,714	58,966	57,218	Samsun
131	Mustafakemalpaşa	37,938	46,731	55,818	56,490	57,162	Bursa
132	Patnos	33,759	71,829	67,121	62,068	57,015	Ağrı
133	Orhangazi	31,889	44,426	53,189	54,333	55,477	Bursa
134	Bismil	39,834	61,162	57,359	56,390	55,421	Diyarbakır
135	Sorgun	31,179	53,884	44,027	49,528	55,029	Yozgat
136	Keşan	40,656	42,755	54,366	54,189	54,012	Edirne
137	Midyat	29,569	56,669	56,340	54,799	53,258	Mardin
138	Merzifon	40,431	45,613	52,050	52,192	52,334	Amasya
139	Bartın	31,974	35,992	47,082	47,999	51,640	Bartın
140	Kapaklı	6,142	27,209	41,956	46,760	51,564	Tekirdağ
141	Milas	28,741	38,063	48,896	50,141	51,386	Muğla
142	Karacabey	31,665	40,624	52,016	51,642	51,268	Bursa
143	Suruç	40,395	44,421	64,765	57,878	50,991	Şanlıurfa
144	Edremit	35,486	39,202	47,383	49,122	50,861	Balıkesir
145	Tire	37,855	42,988	48,565	49,451	50,337	İzmir
146	Fatsa	39,467	63,721	68,917	59,094	49,271	Ordu
147	Silifke	46,858	64,827	52,961	50,327	47,693	Mersin
148	Alaşehir	36,649	39,590	45,971	46,544	47,117	Manisa
149	Didim	11,378	25,699	31,746	39,183	46,620	Aydın
150	Serik	23,106	30,579	49,027	47,784	46,541	Antalya
151	Bilecik	23,273	34,105	45,126	39,453	46,403	Bilecik
152	Karamürsel	24,462	29,353	44,121	44,925	46,132	Kocaeli
153	Bitlis	38,130	44,923	43,359	41,404	46,062	Bitlis
154	Birecik	28,440	40,054	46,304	46,020	45,736	Şanlıurfa
155	Karaköprü	2,719	13,227	22,782	34,098	45,414	Şanlıurfa
156	Samandağ	29,857	34,641	42,012	43,528	45,044	Hatay
157	Erdemli	30,042	40,175	43,721	43,647	43,573	Mersin
158	Ceylanpınar	33,238	44,258	43,890	43,718	43,546	Şanlıurfa
159	Gönen	26,849	36,263	41,811	42,428	43,045	Balıkesir
160	Dilovası	18,590	28,890	40,201	41,455	41,643	Kocaeli
161	Düziçi	31,813	39,097	39,162	40,271	41,380	Osmaniye
162	Uzunköprü	34,741	36,162	41,907	41,165	40,423	Edirne
163	Biga	20,753	27,549	33,509	36,469	39,429	Çanakkale
164	Seydişehir	42,737	48,372	37,763	38,487	39,211	Konya
165	Silvan	60,731	64,136	47,105	42,736	38,367	Diyarbakır
166	Afşin	28,524	35,834	38,625	38,409	38,193	Kahramanmaraş
167	Burhaniye	21,805	31,227	36,696	37,415	38,134	Balıkesir
168	Suluova	36,223	42,715	37,235	37,266	37,297	Amasya
169	Bucak	27,407	28,833	35,621	35,843	36,065	Burdur
170	Sinop	25,537	30,502	34,755	35,393	36,031	Sinop
171	Develi	32,961	35,084	36,121	36,072	36,023	Kayseri
172	Bulancak	24,172	32,182	37,021	36,505	35,989	Giresun
173	Bor	24,556	29,804	35,151	35,532	35,913	Niğde
174	Safranbolu	24,351	31,697	38,334	37,092	35,850	Karabük
175	Akçaabat	26,240	39,102	36,289	35,868	35,447	Trabzon
176	Ayvalık	25,687	31,986	34,651	34,968	35,285	Balıkesir
177	Marmaris	16,361	28,660	28,171	31,450	34,729	Muğla
178	Payas	33,443	30,140	32,587	33,547	34,507	Hatay
179	Sungurlu	30,521	35,397	34,227	34,211	34,195	Çorum
180	Beypazarı	26,225	34,441	34,496	34,319	34,142	Ankara
181	Zile	46,090	52,640	36,154	35,017	33,880	Tokat
182	Kozlu	36,947	30,000	35,132	34,182	33,232	Zonguldak
183	Sandıklı	22,359	37,804	33,856	33,371	32,886	Afyon
184	Bodrum	20,931	32,227	28,575	30,688	32,801	Muğla
185	Bayburt	33,677	32,285	32,546	32,020	32,141	Bayburt
186	Anamur	38,817	49,948	35,789	33,935	32,081	Mersin
187	Karapınar	26,849	35,285	31,913	31,695	31,477	Konya
188	Niksar	35,201	44,808	34,262	32,675	31,088	Tokat
189	Terme	20,381	25,052	28,411	29,693	30,975	Samsun
190	Ilgın	25,032	26,698	31,178	30,892	30,606	Konya
191	İslahiye	34,607	38,770	31,963	31,204	30,445	Gaziantep
192	Beyşehir	30,412	41,312	32,799	31,598	30,397	Konya
193	Erzin	22,477	25,879	30,035	30,137	30,239	Hatay
194	Bolvadin	44,969	52,398	31,352	30,754	30,156	Afyon
195	Tunceli	24,513	25,041	27,091	28,586	30,081	Tunceli
196	Yenişehir	21,210	26,068	28,454	29,128	29,802	Bursa
197	Yerköy	26,248	32,228	31,197	30,335	29,473	Yozgat
198	Çumra	28,781	42,308	28,153	28,798	29,443	Konya
199	Karasu	14,500	24,672	25,607	27,257	28,907	Sakarya
200	Babaeski	22,823	25,559	27,631	28,200	28,769	Kırklareli
201	Malkara	20,180	24,898	27,416	27,997	28,578	Tekirdağ
202	Çan	23,855	28,878	29,172	28,835	28,498	Çanakkale
203	Kumluca	17,166	25,081	31,581	30,015	28,449	Antalya
204	Kurtalan	17,295	24,865	27,561	28,004	28,447	Siirt
205	Ortaca	12,109	16,923	21,634	25,009	28,384	Muğla
206	Şereflikoçhisar	38,248	42,083	27,048	27,602	28,156	Ankara
207	Pazarcık	25,154	24,374	29,339	28,582	27,825	Kahramanmaraş
208	Mut	17,600	36,482	31,520	29,477	27,434	Mersin
209	Gölbaşı	29,588	28,656	26,993	27,087	27,181	Adıyaman
210	Tosya	22,810	23,257	26,841	26,956	27,071	Kastamonu
211	Vezirköprü	20,663	23,211	25,852	25,894	25,936	Samsun
212	Boyabat	21,506	24,681	25,885	25,694	25,503	Sinop
213	Osmancık	21,347	28,423	25,206	25,227	25,248	Çorum
214	Besni	26,076	36,123	24,996	25,083	25,170	Adıyaman
215	Sarıkamış	21,743	23,236	17,915	21,438	24,961	Kars
216	Simav	16,110	28,415	25,677	25,149	24,621	Kütahya
217	Dinar	34,990	35,424	24,340	24,475	24,610	Afyon
218	Artvin	20,306	23,157	24,502	23,527	24,468	Artvin
219	Gümüşhane	26,014	30,270	28,028	26,238	24,448	Gümüşhane
220	Susurluk	18,906	22,305	23,778	24,050	24,322	Balıkesir
221	Akçakale	15,211	32,114	26,877	25,595	24,313	Şanlıurfa
222	Kilimli	34,475	24,626	24,275	24,141	24,007	Zonguldak
223	Harbiye	17,248	20,309	24,500	24,147	23,794	Hatay
224	İdil	12,905	19,123	21,329	22,496	23,663	Şırnak
225	Ardeşen	17,340	45,392	26,762	24,965	23,168	Rize
226	Dalaman	15,025	17,607	20,945	22,046	23,147	Muğla
227	Gelibolu	18,670	23,127	31,246	27,160	23,074	Çanakkale
228	Erdek	13,246	18,626	20,475	21,660	22,845	Balıkesir
229	Gazipaşa	13,697	16,536	20,149	21,415	22,681	Antalya
230	Akçakoca	13,582	25,560	22,416	22,522	22,628	Düzce
231	Çaycuma	16,303	18,734	21,259	21,905	22,551	Zonguldak
232	Çeşme	20,622	25,257	17,950	20,247	22,544	İzmir
233	Kemer	8,449	17,255	16,263	19,342	22,421	Antalya
234	Belen	15,629	18,646	20,303	21,293	22,283	Hatay
235	Saray	13,038	17,769	20,312	21,243	22,174	Tekirdağ
236	İznik	17,232	20,169	22,179	22,170	22,161	Bursa
237	Alaca	20,646	24,983	22,590	22,373	22,156	Çorum
238	Gerede	18,780	25,188	23,310	22,633	21,956	Bolu
239	Devrek	16,442	21,360	25,463	23,654	21,845	Zonguldak
240	Akdağmadeni	12,220	20,312	25,647	23,631	21,615	Yozgat
241	Kaman	26,038	27,962	21,118	21,358	21,598	Kırşehir
242	Serinyol	13,046	15,749	12,517	16,861	21,205	Hatay
243	Kozluk	22,499	27,109	21,651	21,380	21,109	Batman
244	Bulanık	14,988	24,020	20,727	20,889	21,051	Muş
245	Sarıkaya	12,275	22,102	23,171	22,037	20,903	Yozgat
246	Kulu	17,425	28,024	20,496	20,674	20,852	Konya
247	Şarkışla	16,839	20,654	20,851	20,761	20,671	Sivas
248	Korkuteli	13,381	16,521	18,971	19,767	20,563	Antalya
249	Oltu	21,817	23,064	20,162	20,305	20,448	Erzurum
250	Geyve	13,405	17,318	19,802	20,120	20,438	Sakarya
251	İmamoğlu	21,484	30,428	21,331	20,848	20,365	Adana
252	Çine	15,201	17,867	20,211	20,277	20,343	Aydın
253	Çivril	11,445	13,749	14,618	17,299	19,980	Denizli
254	Göksun	22,847	30,232	17,008	18,461	19,914	Kahramanmaraş
255	Derik	13,201	19,806	19,535	19,704	19,873	Mardin
256	Hilvan	14,152	16,094	22,181	21,009	19,837	Şanlıurfa
257	Çayeli	14,947	22,546	25,205	22,502	19,799	Rize
258	İskilip	19,624	19,648	20,782	20,251	19,720	Çorum
259	Havza	17,962	19,385	21,002	20,337	19,672	Samsun
260	Yahyalı	20,401	22,665	20,227	19,909	19,591	Kayseri
261	Hayrabolu	16,923	18,812	18,667	19,096	19,525	Tekirdağ
262	İncirliova	15,870	17,548	18,335	18,921	19,507	Aydın
263	Kovancılar	10,270	21,255	19,358	19,411	19,464	Elazığ
264	Güroymak	16,613	22,521	19,787	19,580	19,373	Bitlis
265	Muratlı	13,192	18,571	18,915	19,138	19,361	Tekirdağ
266	Malazgirt	19,079	23,697	20,987	20,110	19,233	Muş
267	Diyadin	9,569	13,320	18,990	19,089	19,188	Ağrı
268	Emirdağ	21,144	20,508	21,898	20,531	19,164	Afyon
269	Alaplı	12,105	18,487	17,984	18,573	19,162	Zonguldak
270	Bostaniçi	2,499	14,364	17,917	18,520	19,123	Van
271	Gediz	14,403	19,375	18,728	18,904	19,080	Kütahya
272	Sarayköy	15,481	17,760	18,370	18,655	18,940	Denizli
273	Yalvaç	28,028	35,316	20,853	19,822	18,791	Isparta
274	Mahmutlar	4,852	14,463	18,365	18,575	18,785	Antalya
275	Demirci	20,576	21,230	18,642	18,572	18,502	Manisa
276	Ortaköy	19,612	26,961	18,628	18,506	18,384	Aksaray
277	Turgutreis	4,589	6,292	12,613	15,491	18,369	Muğla
278	Karaağaç	10,920	16,250	19,379	18,735	18,091	Hatay
279	Yatağan	11,890	16,007	17,421	17,724	18,027	Muğla
280	Nurdağı	7,048	10,866	15,084	16,537	17,990	Gaziantep
281	Çiftlikköy	5,750	9,622	15,290	16,634	17,978	Yalova
282	Battalgazi	14,994	15,154	15,847	16,792	17,737	Malatya
283	Çermik	16,531	15,843	17,825	17,520	17,215	Diyarbakır
284	Dargeçit	10,079	16,541	14,118	15,666	17,214	Mardin
285	Genç	11,545	18,345	18,885	18,018	17,151	Bingöl
286	Dursunbey	13,025	14,654	17,701	17,364	17,027	Balıkesir
287	Horasan	14,144	16,151	18,664	17,838	17,012	Erzurum
288	Gümüşhacıköy	14,170	14,057	12,847	14,873	16,899	Amasya
289	Kızılcahamam	12,856	16,195	16,655	16,767	16,879	Ankara
290	Pamukova	10,088	13,200	15,181	16,006	16,831	Sakarya
291	Eğirdir	16,050	16,905	20,340	18,559	16,778	Isparta
292	Şarköy	11,425	16,194	15,523	16,121	16,719	Tekirdağ
293	Boğazlıyan	17,970	29,719	15,722	16,209	16,696	Yozgat
294	Hopa	11,507	15,445	17,361	17,024	16,687	Artvin
295	Yeşilli	10,451	19,700	14,635	15,533	16,521	Mardin
296	Dikili	10,023	12,552	14,545	15,530	16,515	İzmir
297	Ahlat	16,742	34,787	22,699	19,551	16,403	Bitlis
298	Ardahan	16,761	17,274	17,446	16,923	16,400	Ardahan
299	Ürgüp	11,040	14,538	15,456	15,912	16,368	Nevşehir
300	Çekmece	7,800	11,824	16,694	16,492	16,290	Hatay
301	Taşköprü	11,454	16,181	16,288	16,226	16,164	Kastamonu
302	Zeytinli	5,614	10,893	14,484	15,313	16,142	Balıkesir
303	Eskil	16,462	22,125	18,276	17,098	15,920	Aksaray
304	Muradiye	11,167	19,702	13,816	14,830	15,844	Van
305	Espiye	10,219	12,990	16,823	16,332	15,841	Giresun
306	Bozyazı	22,168	26,314	15,414	15,618	15,822	Mersin
307	Bigadiç	12,976	14,550	15,638	15,724	15,810	Balıkesir
308	Kırkağaç	21,421	25,093	26,006	20,889	15,772	Manisa
309	Saruhanlı	12,977	13,025	15,151	15,420	15,689	Manisa
310	Demre	13,793	13,900	15,762	15,662	15,562	Antalya
311	Kızılpınar	3,718	7,716	10,968	13,131	15,294	Tekirdağ
312	Pazar	11,068	14,682	16,636	15,922	15,208	Rize
313	Cihanbeyli	15,071	18,306	15,192	15,192	15,192	Konya
314	Marmaraereğlisi	5,457	8,779	8,488	11,803	15,118	Tekirdağ
315	Altınoluk	5,219	8,997	11,641	13,365	15,089	Balıkesir
316	Banaz	14,287	16,212	15,405	15,241	15,077	Uşak
317	Görele	21,098	27,214	14,428	14,738	15,048	Giresun
318	Buldan	12,202	13,986	15,066	14,966	14,866	Denizli
319	Elmalı	12,384	14,561	14,038	14,442	14,846	Antalya
320	Araklı	12,141	22,506	22,200	18,395	14,590	Trabzon
321	Of	15,794	25,478	17,529	16,002	14,475	Trabzon
322	Çaldıran	4,780	12,841	16,172	15,311	14,450	Van
323	Şemdinli	7,001	14,177	11,727	13,081	14,435	Hakkâri
324	Denizciler	9,280	17,495	16,178	15,276	14,374	Hatay
325	Arhavi	10,048	14,079	16,101	15,194	14,287	Artvin
326	Side	11,333	21,000	6,500	10,382	14,264	Antalya
327	Armutalan	4,727	8,310	15,549	14,881	14,213	Muğla
328	Vakfıkebir	21,343	33,394	13,401	13,779	14,157	Trabzon
329	Aybastı	17,143	14,326	14,767	14,456	14,145	Ordu
330	Karakoçan	14,953	23,994	12,903	13,487	14,071	Elazığ
331	Obaköy	6,183	20,040	13,912	13,988	14,064	Antalya
332	Narlıca	4,505	9,378	12,750	13,404	14,058	Hatay
333	Türkoğlu	14,608	11,918	13,822	13,933	14,044	Kahramanmaraş
334	Solhan	12,191	14,325	17,895	15,950	14,005	Bingöl
335	Çay	14,147	18,137	14,702	14,353	14,004	Afyon
336	Osmaneli	8,704	12,814	13,419	13,641	13,863	Bilecik
337	Kadınhanı	15,907	14,816	14,096	13,967	13,838	Konya
338	Pelitli	3,139	10,615	15,067	14,367	13,667	Trabzon
339	Sürmene	15,453	17,063	13,689	13,670	13,651	Trabzon
340	Kelkit	11,541	19,090	13,219	13,417	13,615	Gümüşhane
341	Pasinler	19,144	22,787	15,950	14,762	13,574	Erzurum
342	Kağızman	15,274	21,685	23,012	18,258	13,504	Kars
343	Suşehri	23,202	25,137	13,941	13,715	13,489	Sivas
343	Ilıca	2,929	16,807	4,467	8,978	13,489	Antalya
345	Sarıgöl	10,677	12,043	13,045	13,216	13,387	Manisa
346	Tirebolu	14,459	16,112	13,672	13,488	13,304	Giresun
347	Başkale	16,418	14,144	15,910	14,601	13,292	Van
348	Bayramiç	10,056	11,988	13,134	13,211	13,288	Çanakkale
349	Karaçulha	5,656	8,574	13,063	13,114	13,165	Muğla
350	Korgan	13,171	15,587	12,773	12,967	13,161	Ordu
351	Eşme	10,547	11,615	13,207	13,120	13,033	Uşak
352	Gölhisar	10,434	12,434	13,502	13,255	13,008	Burdur
353	Sındırgı	9,511	10,492	12,668	12,824	12,980	Balıkesir
354	Arsin	8,192	13,038	8,453	10,715	12,977	Trabzon
355	Ortaklar	10,006	12,074	12,973	12,912	12,851	Aydın
356	Bahçe	16,009	18,411	13,641	13,241	12,841	Osmaniye
357	Edremit	4,790	6,481	12,247	12,541	12,835	Van
358	Uludere	6,289	7,928	9,228	11,030	12,832	Şırnak
359	Konaklı	4,794	28,801	12,027	12,396	12,765	Antalya
360	Kocaali	10,131	13,793	13,089	12,921	12,753	Sakarya
361	Çağlayancerit	10,435	12,642	12,454	12,572	12,690	Kahramanmaraş
362	Germencik	12,285	11,596	12,453	12,544	12,635	Aydın
363	Kadıkendi	-	263	196	6,404	12,612	Şanlıurfa
364	Şarkikaraağaç	12,253	24,502	9,538	11,059	12,580	Isparta
365	Çelebibağı	4,356	11,629	12,693	12,611	12,529	Van
366	Bünyan	13,653	12,510	12,905	12,705	12,505	Kayseri
367	Çınarcık	7,629	8,953	9,170	10,816	12,462	Yalova
368	Şuhut	12,982	13,630	12,038	12,236	12,434	Afyon
369	Tavas	11,777	11,700	13,000	12,709	12,418	Denizli
370	Mucur	11,119	14,676	11,984	12,197	12,410	Kırşehir
371	Beşikdüzü	15,652	29,766	11,641	12,020	12,399	Trabzon
372	Kumru	10,774	18,057	11,856	12,116	12,376	Ordu
373	Nallıhan	11,638	17,181	12,895	12,630	12,365	Ankara
374	Acıpayam	8,054	9,956	12,002	12,154	12,306	Denizli
375	Kınık	17,167	13,136	11,340	11,752	12,164	İzmir
376	Sason	6,847	9,705	10,673	11,363	12,053	Batman
377	Vize	10,518	10,628	11,908	11,966	12,024	Kırklareli
378	Hasköy	10,532	21,342	16,978	14,480	11,982	Muş
379	Finike	6,700	9,746	10,509	11,244	11,979	Antalya
380	Doğanşehir	11,046	13,517	10,176	11,015	11,854	Malatya
381	İscehisar	10,071	10,542	11,721	11,773	11,825	Afyon
382	Özalp	4,920	6,997	9,402	10,596	11,790	Van
383	Çifteler	11,540	11,883	11,887	11,810	11,733	Eskişehir
384	Kuzuculu	9,709	11,309	10,899	11,279	11,659	Hatay
385	Tömük	9,282	11,921	10,384	11,013	11,642	Mersin
386	Küçükköy	5,797	9,088	6,700	9,164	11,628	Balıkesir
387	Ezine	11,167	13,309	14,125	12,857	11,589	Çanakkale
388	Taşova	10,197	15,556	10,413	10,997	11,581	Amasya
389	Pınarhisar	11,236	11,263	10,253	10,913	11,573	Kırklareli
390	Kargıpınarı	8,677	12,741	11,709	11,590	11,559	Mersin
391	Avanos	10,010	11,921	11,744	11,647	11,550	Nevşehir
392	Yeniceköy	3,672	10,000	11,487	11,509	11,531	Bursa
393	Gördes	9,767	10,809	10,295	10,845	11,395	Manisa
394	Gölköy	18,149	24,162	12,065	11,715	11,365	Ordu
395	Zara	16,353	17,845	12,337	11,835	11,333	Sivas
396	Umurlu	9,157	10,436	11,595	11,439	11,283	Aydın
397	Gerze	8,736	10,013	9,985	10,618	11,251	Sinop
398	Ondokuzmayıs	6,212	8,928	11,417	11,329	11,241	Samsun
399	Datça	5,022	8,108	8,839	10,034	11,229	Muğla
400	Pınarbaşı	11,364	12,075	12,654	11,927	11,200	Kayseri
401	Çınar	10,080	13,282	12,725	11,936	11,147	Diyarbakır
402	Ayancık	10,418	10,919	10,991	11,067	11,143	Sinop
403	Lice	12,227	11,927	13,118	12,111	11,104	Diyarbakır
404	Alaçam	12,097	11,950	11,321	11,203	11,085	Samsun
405	Serinhisar	17,112	15,864	10,699	10,870	11,041	Denizli
406	Yalıkavak	3,780	8,000	8,701	9,845	10,989	Muğla
407	Yomra	7,335	13,346	9,838	10,404	10,970	Trabzon
408	Yeşilköy	8,562	8,999	10,205	10,575	10,945	Hatay
409	Havran	8,878	10,122	10,531	10,713	10,895	Balıkesir
410	Çukurca	5,205	7,471	7,033	8,957	10,881	Hakkâri
411	Bozova	16,745	19,848	14,450	12,657	10,864	Şanlıurfa
412	Lapseki	5,789	8,489	10,612	10,727	10,842	Çanakkale
413	Altınova	8,469	10,791	10,273	10,556	10,839	Balıkesir
414	Emet	12,246	19,350	10,198	10,502	10,806	Kütahya
415	Akçay	-	9,039	9,095	9,947	10,799	Balıkesir
416	Divriği	17,664	14,429	11,980	11,388	10,796	Sivas
417	Davutlar	5,960	6,903	9,599	10,123	10,647	Aydın
418	Karaağaç	-	5,385	8,462	9,525	10,588	Edirne
419	Derinkuyu	8,580	11,092	10,211	10,399	10,587	Nevşehir
420	Çekerek	10,398	12,339	11,394	10,983	10,572	Yozgat
421	Ermenek	12,592	15,509	10,683	10,609	10,535	Karaman
422	Borçka	6,102	9,008	10,433	10,481	10,529	Artvin
423	Mazıdağı	9,526	11,194	10,297	10,410	10,523	Mardin
424	Alaçatı	7,187	-	7,206	8,839	10,472	İzmir
425	Keskin	20,044	34,827	11,271	10,853	10,435	Kırıkkale
426	Kandıra	10,427	12,641	15,473	14,492	10,427	Kocaeli
427	Ahmetli	10,190	11,011	9,517	9,969	10,421	Manisa
428	Şefaatli	13,171	13,728	11,010	10,704	10,398	Yozgat
429	Çamaş	10,430	10,047	9,015	9,699	10,383	Ordu
430	Haymana	9,144	11,313	9,464	9,922	10,380	Ankara
431	Bayat	8,090	7,381	7,460	8,888	10,316	Çorum
432	Büyükyoncalı	4,473	7,335	9,390	9,847	10,304	Tekirdağ
433	Tomarza	11,337	10,963	10,414	10,347	10,280	Kayseri
434	Sultanhanı	8,397	10,104	10,427	10,336	10,245	Aksaray
435	Kepez	4,282	7,918	10,655	10,434	10,213	Çanakkale
436	Tunçbilek	7,449	5,900	4,317	7,254	10,191	Kütahya
437	Adilcevaz	10,103	35,174	24,727	17,458	10,189	Bitlis
438	Bozdoğan	8,034	8,300	9,277	9,725	10,173	Aydın
439	Gevaş	9,994	10,988	11,042	10,594	10,146	Van
440	Gelinkaya	2,200	6,470	3,341	6,707	10,073	Mardin
441	Aşkale	15,494	15,548	12,842	11,455	10,068	Erzurum
442	Kangal	12,276	12,099	10,989	10,522	10,055	Sivas
442	Turgutalp	5,223	7,437	9,113	9,584	10,055	Manisa
444	Köşk	6,022	8,349	9,544	9,778	10,012	Aydın
445	Yahşihan	5,695	8,215	9,166	9,573	9,980	Kırıkkale
446	Cikcilli	-	5,167	7,701	8,831	9,961	Antalya
447	Acarlar	6,554	8,279	9,756	9,823	9,890	Aydın
448	Pozantı	7,892	9,627	9,835	9,859	9,883	Adana
449	Yenice	9,840	11,228	9,897	9,884	9,871	Karabük
450	Sivrihisar	10,490	10,574	10,293	10,080	9,867	Eskişehir
451	Eruh	5,929	7,226	9,450	9,617	9,784	Siirt
452	Gölmarmara	10,976	11,205	9,938	9,857	9,776	Manisa
453	Kulp	7,472	15,825	11,474	10,616	9,758	Diyarbakır
454	Söğüt	9,470	12,644	15,761	12,755	9,749	Bilecik
455	Taşucu	6,743	10,466	7,820	8,777	9,734	Mersin
456	Odabaşı	5,070	7,184	10,192	9,961	9,730	Hatay
457	Fındıklı	7,022	11,043	9,909	9,803	9,697	Rize
458	Perşembe	10,979	10,804	10,288	9,943	9,598	Ordu
459	Gölyaka	4,265	8,572	8,007	8,778	9,549	Düzce
460	Şebinkarahisar	23,518	36,713	13,698	11,599	9,500	Giresun
461	Araban	14,275	10,666	9,805	9,651	9,497	Gaziantep
462	Hassa	7,714	9,071	9,117	9,301	9,485	Hatay
463	Akçadağ	10,839	13,432	8,427	8,948	9,469	Malatya
464	Savaştepe	10,053	10,288	9,296	9,366	9,436	Balıkesir
465	Kaynaşlı	5,878	9,439	9,329	9,362	9,395	Düzce
466	Karayılan	13,883	11,187	10,611	9,972	9,333	Hatay
467	Reşadiye	12,321	16,389	8,892	9,108	9,324	Tokat
468	Hizan	5,880	11,067	11,205	10,258	9,311	Bitlis
469	Sarayönü	10,721	10,386	9,053	9,169	9,285	Konya
470	Hani	10,266	10,918	8,292	8,778	9,264	Diyarbakır
471	Palu	7,900	10,103	8,894	9,069	9,244	Elazığ
472	İnebolu	8,350	9,486	9,747	9,465	9,183	Kastamonu
473	Honaz	6,333	7,442	9,239	9,187	9,135	Denizli
474	Gürün	9,886	11,294	10,231	9,680	9,129	Sivas
475	Beşiri	5,456	8,554	8,573	8,829	9,085	Batman
476	Yunak	10,499	12,734	10,107	9,561	9,015	Konya
477	Yeşilhisar	11,904	13,586	9,747	9,376	9,005	Kayseri
478	Avsallar	3,661	8,493	7,849	8,424	8,999	Antalya
479	Yıldızeli	15,249	16,070	9,867	9,430	8,993	Sivas
480	Varto	11,339	16,382	10,764	9,876	8,988	Muş
481	Mavikent	6,224	9,276	8,033	8,510	8,987	Antalya
482	Halfeti	4,128	2,766	10,238	9,609	8,980	Şanlıurfa
483	Pertek	5,428	5,737	6,032	7,496	8,960	Tunceli
484	Küçükdalyan	4,866	5,909	8,095	8,525	8,955	Hatay
485	Çerkeş	8,579	15,536	8,572	8,755	8,938	Çankırı
486	Yazıkonak	5,229	12,000	7,922	8,426	8,930	Elazığ
487	Akbez	6,162	6,478	8,986	8,956	8,926	Hatay
488	Tekebaşı	4,851	6,393	8,541	8,706	8,871	Hatay
489	Karaçoban	7,498	12,683	8,945	8,901	8,857	Erzurum
490	Karataş	9,025	9,189	8,358	8,601	8,844	Adana
491	Konacık	-	4,035	8,717	8,775	8,833	Muğla
492	Hınıs	16,005	27,504	10,802	9,803	8,804	Erzurum
493	İpsala	9,212	8,471	7,851	8,318	8,785	Edirne
494	Çobanlar	6,675	-	8,630	8,706	8,782	Afyon
495	Havsa	9,237	8,081	8,547	8,664	8,781	Edirne
496	Çatalağzı	13,401	7,945	9,079	8,927	8,775	Zonguldak
497	Yakınca	10,884	13,727	10,005	9,378	8,751	Malatya
498	Beyoğlu	8,439	8,253	8,035	8,388	8,741	Kahramanmaraş
499	Çayırhan	6,211	9,000	8,721	8,719	8,717	Ankara
500	Sahilkent	5,317	7,218	8,211	8,434	8,657	Antalya
501	Gülşehir	8,499	9,377	8,484	8,569	8,654	Nevşehir
502	Darende	11,488	13,908	9,685	9,165	8,645	Malatya
503	Ladik	8,061	9,098	8,640	8,633	8,626	Samsun
504	Koru	-	-	5,006	6,810	8,614	Yalova
505	Kestel	3,610	-	6,886	7,742	8,598	Antalya
506	Eleşkirt	9,871	15,339	11,194	9,881	8,568	Ağrı
507	Sultanköy	-	-	2,050	5,297	8,544	Tekirdağ
508	Dilek	7,326	8,168	7,443	7,986	8,529	Malatya
509	Yeniçiftlik	3,721	-	5,650	7,063	8,476	Tekirdağ
510	Turunçova	7,371	8,412	8,629	8,549	8,469	Antalya
510	Gözcüler	9,058	7,208	8,273	8,371	8,469	Hatay
512	Köyceğiz	6,406	7,523	8,466	8,467	8,468	Muğla
512	Sarılar	-	3,838	6,550	7,509	8,468	Antalya
514	Eynesil	6,713	10,667	7,970	8,216	8,462	Giresun
515	Mykropenos	6,828	9,233	11,174	10,065	8,447	Antalya
516	Ladik	-	-	8,378	8,404	8,430	Konya
517	Aydıncık	7,040	7,941	7,851	8,101	8,351	Mersin
518	Tuzluca	7,698	8,827	11,239	9,790	8,341	Iğdır
519	Çelikhan	8,033	11,306	8,205	8,253	8,301	Adıyaman
520	Söğütlü	3,599	7,173	9,435	8,855	8,275	Trabzon
521	Yenice	7,300	17,199	8,447	8,320	8,247	Mersin
522	Kiraz	7,850	10,001	8,683	8,464	8,245	İzmir
523	Kabala	5,963	9,275	10,951	9,588	8,225	Mardin
524	Dicle	5,414	9,861	12,227	10,219	8,211	Diyarbakır
525	Toprakkale	7,993	8,413	7,423	7,803	8,183	Osmaniye
526	Yeşilyurt	9,184	11,998	7,700	7,940	8,180	Malatya
527	Yurtbaşı	5,362	8,014	7,486	7,828	8,170	Elazığ
528	Bostanbaşı	2,212	-	5,337	6,744	8,151	Malatya
529	Yeniceoba	8,128	9,194	7,863	8,003	8,143	Konya
530	Savur	6,244	7,817	8,942	8,500	8,058	Mardin
531	Kale	6,950	7,189	7,713	7,864	8,015	Denizli
532	Savuca	6,277	7,932	8,192	8,063	7,934	Aydın
533	Andırın	7,506	8,311	8,026	7,975	7,924	Kahramanmaraş
534	Keşap	8,208	9,475	8,968	8,443	7,918	Giresun
535	Hekimhan	13,612	13,206	7,708	7,802	7,896	Malatya
536	İsmil	6,576	7,317	5,930	6,909	7,888	Konya
537	Narlı	5,401	8,798	8,547	8,215	7,883	Kahramanmaraş
538	Kuyucak	7,779	7,282	7,762	7,813	7,864	Aydın
539	Gürgentepe	18,875	18,313	8,404	8,130	7,856	Ordu
540	Çilimli	3,717	7,147	4,504	6,168	7,832	Düzce
541	Orhaneli	6,434	8,071	7,956	7,888	7,820	Bursa
542	Beldibi	1,376	4,848	8,546	8,160	7,774	Muğla
543	Göle	7,542	10,478	7,438	7,588	7,738	Ardahan
544	Aktepe	7,917	8,692	8,007	7,850	7,693	Hatay
545	Ayvacık	5,595	6,475	7,609	7,642	7,675	Çanakkale
546	Çayıralan	7,644	14,046	8,425	8,039	7,653	Yozgat
547	Bozkır	9,472	10,483	6,801	7,217	7,633	Konya
548	Saraykent	6,059	9,224	8,976	8,300	7,624	Yozgat
549	Tonya	11,058	12,666	7,711	7,660	7,609	Trabzon
550	Kavak	5,745	7,871	8,629	8,117	7,605	Samsun
551	Keçiborlu	8,955	10,390	7,283	7,419	7,555	Isparta
552	Ovaeymir	5,211	6,518	7,049	7,293	7,537	Aydın
553	Çolaklı	5,735	10,719	5,161	6,349	7,537	Antalya
554	İçeriçumra	8,517	12,335	7,460	7,465	7,470	Konya
555	Maçka	7,673	10,700	5,063	6,262	7,461	Trabzon
556	Bitez	2,094	5,207	5,217	6,317	7,417	Muğla
557	Yağlıdere	4,899	4,336	8,127	7,758	7,389	Giresun
558	Çarşıbaşı	6,649	8,532	7,154	7,266	7,378	Trabzon
559	Durağan	7,432	9,725	7,290	7,332	7,374	Sinop
560	Kozaklı	7,556	7,755	6,771	7,065	7,359	Nevşehir
561	Piraziz	8,201	9,416	7,640	7,483	7,326	Giresun
562	Bekbele	5,478	-	7,482	7,399	7,316	Hatay
563	Şekeroba	4,919	6,225	7,009	7,156	7,303	Kahramanmaraş
564	Arıtaş	9,783	8,690	5,969	6,626	7,283	Kahramanmaraş
565	Atça	7,763	7,660	7,518	7,396	7,274	Aydın
566	Gökçebey	5,862	7,939	7,479	7,376	7,273	Zonguldak
567	Ulukışla	5,545	6,368	4,979	6,124	7,269	Niğde
568	Gülüç	5,082	5,955	7,655	7,452	7,249	Zonguldak
569	Altınova	2,176	-	3,429	5,330	7,231	Yalova
570	Sakçagöze	4,579	-	4,389	5,808	7,227	Gaziantep
571	Atayurt	3,600	7,120	7,403	7,310	7,217	Mersin
572	Işıklar	5,014	7,334	7,118	7,135	7,152	Afyon
573	Uluborlu	12,947	-	5,817	6,479	7,141	Isparta
574	Göynük	4,266	10,119	5,666	6,401	7,136	Bolu
575	Ilgaz	8,136	-	6,981	7,051	7,121	Çankırı
576	Atakent	4,751	14,553	5,612	6,362	7,112	Mersin
577	Çiçekdağı	6,468	-	6,604	6,856	7,108	Kırşehir
578	Gökçe	3,148	3,148	6,563	6,831	7,099	Mardin
579	Buharkent	5,795	7,074	6,813	6,955	7,097	Aydın
580	Velimeşe	4,034	5,003	6,485	6,777	7,069	Tekirdağ
581	Şiran	8,147	11,977	7,511	7,261	7,011	Gümüşhane
582	Yenice	-	6,903	-	-	-	Çanakkale

== Map ==
Locations of the 20 most populous cities in Turkey

== List of metropolitan municipalities ==
Some provinces of Turkey have the status of metropolitan municipalities, all their population being part of metropolitan areas of corresponding cities. There are 20 metropolitan cities in Turkey with population over a million.

Rank	City	Population
1	Istanbul	15,655,924
2	Ankara	5,803,482
3	İzmir	4,479,525
4	Bursa	3,214,571
5	Antalya	2,696,249
6	Konya	2,320,241
7	Adana	2,270,298
8	Şanlıurfa	2,213,964
9	Gaziantep	2,164,134
10	Kocaeli	2,102,907
11	Mersin	1,938,389
12	Diyarbakır	1,818,133
13	Hatay	1,544,640
14	Manisa	1,475,716
15	Kayseri	1,445,683
16	Samsun	1,377,546
17	Balıkesir	1,273,519
18	Tekirdağ	1,167,059
19	Aydın	1,161,702
20	Van	1,127,612

== See also ==
- List of metropolitan municipalities in Turkey
- List of districts in Turkey
- List of provinces in Turkey
- Provinces of Turkey by population
- List of regions in Turkey
