= Kadiruşağı, Yeşilyurt =

Village in Turkey

Kadiruşağı
- Neighbourhood
- Location in Turkey
- Coordinates: 38.235°N 38.248°E
- Country: Turkey
- Province: Malatya
- District: Yeşilyurt
- Population (2025): 353
- Time zone: UTC+3 (TRT)

Kadiruşağı is a neighbourhood in the municipality and district of Yeşilyurt, Malatya Province in Turkey. It is populated by Turks had a population of 353 in 2025.
