= Üçgöze, Yeşilyurt =

Village in Turkey

Üçgöze
- Neighbourhood
- Location in Turkey
- Coordinates: 38.223°N 38.356°E
- Country: Turkey
- Province: Malatya
- District: Yeşilyurt
- Population (2025): 163
- Time zone: UTC+3 (TRT)

Üçgöze (Kurdish: Rafa) is a neighbourhood in the municipality and district of Yeşilyurt, Malatya Province in Turkey. It is populated by Kurds had a population of 163 in 2025.
