= Elections for metropolitan municipalities in Turkey =

Turkish metropolitan municipality election results

The outcome of the elections (in terms of the number of mayors) for metropolitan municipalities in Turkey is shown below. The number of metropolitan centers was three in 1984 (Ankara, Istanbul and İzmir) and eight in 1989 (with Adana, Bursa, Gaziantep, Kayseri and Konya). In 1994, the number increased to 15 (with Antalya, Erzurum, Eskişehir, Diyarbakır, Kocaeli, Mersin and Samsun) and in 2004 to 16 (with Sakarya). In 2014, 14 new metropolitan municipalities were established. The abbreviations for the names of the parties are shown in section abbreviations.

Date of election	ANAP	DYP DP	RP-FP	SHP	DSP	CHP	MHP	HADEP DTP BDP HDP	AKP	Total
25.03.1984	3	…	…	…	…	…	…	…	…	3
26.03.1989	…	1	1	6	…	…	…	…	…	8
27.03.1994	3	3	6	2	…	1	…	…	...	15
18.04.1999	2	…	4	…	4	3	1	1	…	15
28.03.2004	…	…	…	…	1	2	…	1	12	16
29.03.2009	…	…	…	…	1	3	1	1	10	16
30.03.2014	…	…	…	…	…	6	3	3 (Note: Including an independent supported by the party)	18	30
31.03.2019	…	…	…	…	…	11	1	3	15	30

== See also ==
- The number of Turkish municipalities

== Abbreviations ==
- ANAP: Motherland Party (later on merged into True Path Party)
- DYP: True Path Party (later on renamed Democratic Party)
- DP: Democrat Party
- RP: Welfare Party
- FP: Virtue Party
- SHP: Social Democrat People’s Party (later on merged with CHP)
- CHP: Issued from SHP (later on merged with SHP)
- DSP: Democratic Left Party
- MHP: Nationalist Movement Party (actually in 1989 National Task Party)
- HADEP: People’s Democracy Party(In 2004 as a coalition with SHP (not to be confused with SHP above))
- DTP: Democratic Society Party
- AKP: Justice and Development Party
- BDP :Peace and Democracy Party
