= Kozluk, Yeşilyurt =

Village in Turkey

Kozluk
- Neighbourhood
- Location in Turkey
- Coordinates: 38.229°N 38.300°E
- Country: Turkey
- Province: Malatya
- District: Yeşilyurt
- Population (2025): 406
- Time zone: UTC+3 (TRT)

Kozluk is a neighbourhood in the municipality and district of Yeşilyurt, Malatya Province in Turkey. It had a population of 406 in 2025.
