= Dilek, Malatya =

Dilek
- Neighbourhood
- Location in Turkey
- Coordinates: 38°27′N 38°15′E
- Country: Turkey
- Province: Malatya
- District: Yeşilyurt
- Elevation: 780 m (2,560 ft)
- Population (2022): 7,312
- Time zone: UTC+3 (TRT)
- Postal code: 44180
- Area code: 0422

Dilek is a neighbourhood of the municipality and district of Yeşilyurt, Malatya Province, Turkey. Its population is 7,312 (2022). Before the 2013 reorganisation, it was a town (belde). Also in 2013, it passed from the former central district of Malatya Province to Yeşilyurt district.

Dilek is situated several kilometers southwest of Karakaya Dam reservoir. It lies to the east of Turkish state highway D.850 which connects Malatya to Sivas. The distance to Malatya is 13 kilometres (8.1 mi). The railroad from Malatya to the north also passes through Dilek. In 1964 Dilek was declared a seat of township. Major economic activity of the town is fruit gardening. Apricot is the main product.
