= Kırlangıç, Yeşilyurt =

Village in Turkey

Kırlangıç
- Neighbourhood
- Location in Turkey
- Coordinates: 38.244°N 38.064°E
- Country: Turkey
- Province: Malatya
- District: Yeşilyurt
- Population (2025): 226
- Time zone: UTC+3 (TRT)

Kırlangıç is a neighbourhood in the municipality and district of Yeşilyurt, Malatya Province in Turkey. It is populated by Kurds of the Balan tribe had a population of 226 in 2025.
