= Şahnahan, Yeşilyurt =

Village in Turkey

Şahnahan
- Neighbourhood
- Location in Turkey
- Coordinates: 38.415831°N 38.210832°E
- Country: Turkey
- Province: Malatya
- District: Yeşilyurt
- Population (2025): 4,246
- Time zone: UTC+3 (TRT)

Şahnahan is a neighbourhood in the municipality and district of Yeşilyurt, Malatya Province in Turkey. It is populated by Kurds and Turks had a population of 4,246 in 2025.
