= İkizce, Yeşilyurt =

Village in Turkey

İkizce
- Neighbourhood
- Location in Turkey
- Coordinates: 38.295°N 38.197°E
- Country: Turkey
- Province: Malatya
- District: Yeşilyurt
- Population (2025): 9,303
- Time zone: UTC+3 (TRT)

İkizce (Kurdish: Haçova) is a neighbourhood in the municipality and district of Yeşilyurt, Malatya Province in Turkey. It is populated by Kurds had a population of 9,303 in 2025.

The population of the village increased from 744 in 2022 to 9,303 in 2025 as the government constructed the largest TOKİ site for displaced people from the February 2023 earthquake next to the village.
