= İsmil =

- Neighbourhood
- Location in Turkey İsmil (Turkey Central Anatolia)
- Coordinates: 37°43′N 33°03′E
- Country: Turkey
- Province: Konya
- District: Karatay
- Elevation: 1,005 m (3,297 ft)
- Population (2022): 5,736
- Time zone: UTC+3 (TRT)
- Postal code: 42290
- Area code: 0332

İsmil is a neighbourhood of the municipality and district of Karatay, Konya Province, Turkey. Its population is 5,736 (2022). Before the 2013 reorganisation, it was a town (belde).

== Geography ==
İsmil is a few kilometers south of the Turkish state highway D.330 which connects Konya to Adana. The highway distance to Konya is about 60 km (37 mi).

== History ==
The first mention of İsmil in historical records was in the 15th century with reference to the farm of İsmil. The farm was owned by a certain İsmail of Khorasan indicating that the original population of the settlement was Turkmens from Khorasan. In the 17th century there is another record about the marsh area around İsmil. In 1956 İsmil was declared a seat of township.

== Economy ==
Wheat and sugar beet are the main crops of the town. The town also expects revenue from thermal springs around the town when the accommodation infrastructure, now under construction, will be completed.
