= Topsöğüt, Yeşilyurt =

Village in Turkey

Topsöğüt
- Neighbourhood
- Location in Turkey
- Coordinates: 38.372°N 38.238°E
- Country: Turkey
- Province: Malatya
- District: Yeşilyurt
- Population (2025): 6,453
- Time zone: UTC+3 (TRT)

Topsöğüt (Kurdish: Topsogût) is a neighbourhood in the municipality and district of Yeşilyurt, Malatya Province in Turkey. It is populated by Kurds of the Reşwan tribe had a population of 6,453 in 2025.
