= Karatay, Konya =

Karatay
- District and municipality
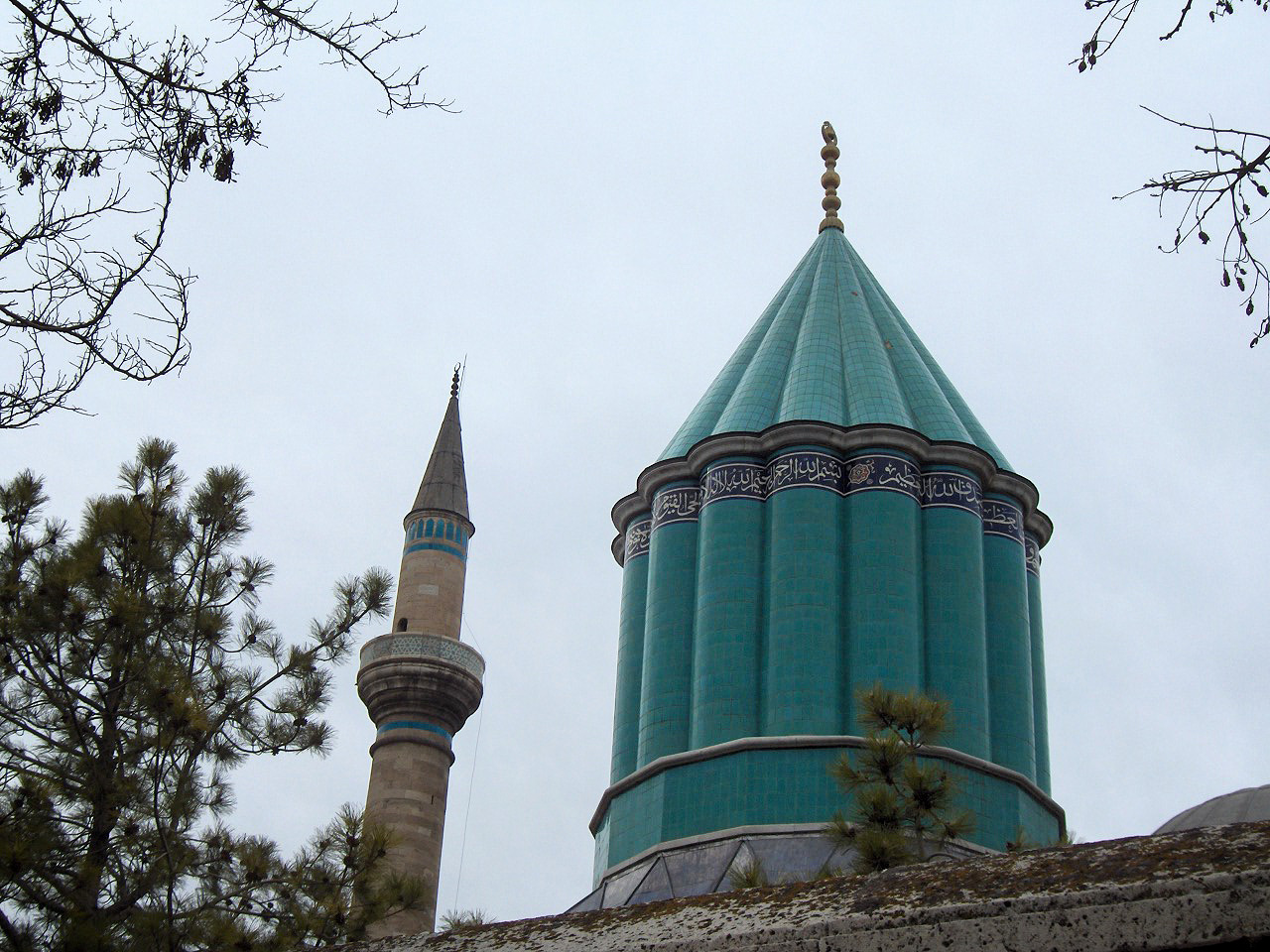
- Mevlana Museum, Karatay

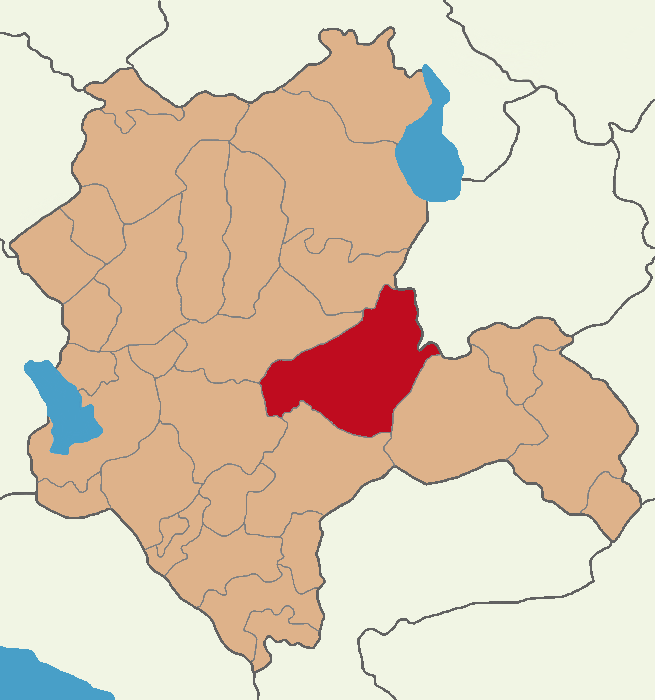
- Map showing Karatay District in Konya Province

- Location within Turkey Location within Turkey Central Anatolia
- Coordinates: 37°52′05″N 32°31′44″E
- Country: Turkey
- Province: Konya

Government
  - Mayor: Hasan Kılca (AKP)
- Area: 2,832 km^{2} (1,093 sq mi)
- Elevation: 1,015 m (3,330 ft)
- Population (2024): 385,432
  - Density: 136.1/km^{2} (352.5/sq mi)
- Time zone: UTC+3 (TRT)
- Area code: 0332
- Website: www.karatay.bel.tr

Karatay is a municipality and district of Konya Province, Turkey. Its area is 2,832 km^{2}, and its population is 370,927 (2022). Karatay is one of the central districts of Konya along with the districts of Meram and Selçuklu. It covers the eastern part of the agglomeration of Konya and the adjacent countryside.

The solar power plant Kızören in Konya which went online in 2016 covers an area of 430,000 m^{2} and will be able to produce 26 GWh of electricity annually.

== Places to see ==
- Mevlana Museum
- Aziziye Mosque

== Composition ==
There are 80 neighbourhoods in Karatay District:

- Acıdort
- Akabe
- Akbaş
- Akçeşme
- Akifpaşa
- Akörenkışla
- Aksaklı
- Aziziye
- Bakırtolu
- Başak
- Başgötüren
- Beşağıl
- Büyükburnak
- Büyüksinan
- Çatalhüyük
- Çatalömek
- Çelebi
- Çengilti
- Çimenlik
- Divanlar
- Doğuş
- Elmacı
- Emirgazi
- Erenler
- Erler
- Esentepe
- Fetih
- Fevziçakmak
- Gaziosmanpaşa
- Göçü
- Hacıhasan
- Hacıibalı
- Hacısadık
- Hacıveyiszade
- Hacıyusufmescit
- Hamzaoğlu
- Hasandede
- Hayıroğlu
- İpekler
- İsmil
- İstiklal
- Kalenderhane
- Karaaslandede
- Karaaslanüzümcü
- Karaciğan
- Karadona
- Karakaya
- Karakulak
- Katrancı
- Kayacıkaraplar
- Keçeciler
- Kerimdede
- Keykubat
- Kızören
- Köprübaşı
- Köseali
- Kumköprü
- Mengene
- Nakipoğlu
- Obruk
- Orhangazi
- Ortakonak
- Ovakavağı
- Sakyatan
- Saraçoğlu
- Sarıyakup
- Şatır
- Selimsultan
- Şemsitebrizi
- Sultan Mesud
- Sürüç
- Tatlıcak
- Ulubatlıhasan
- Yağlıbayat
- Yarma
- Yavşankuyu
- Yediler
- Yenice
- Yenikent
- Zincirli

== Twin cities ==
- Novi Pazar, Serbia
