= Aşağıköy, Yeşilyurt =

Village in Turkey

Aşağıköy
- Neighbourhood
- Location in Turkey
- Coordinates: 38.143°N 38.318°E
- Country: Turkey
- Province: Malatya
- District: Yeşilyurt
- Population (2025): 263
- Time zone: UTC+3 (TRT)

Aşağıköy (Kurdish: Aşaxikoy) is a neighbourhood in the municipality and district of Yeşilyurt, Malatya Province in Turkey. It is populated by Kurds of the Cêlikan tribe had a population of 263 in 2025.
