= Yakınca =

- Neighbourhood
- Location in Turkey
- Coordinates: 38°18′N 38°15′E
- Country: Turkey
- Province: Malatya
- District: Yeşilyurt
- Elevation: 1,040 m (3,410 ft)
- Population (2022): 23,063
- Time zone: UTC+3 (TRT)
- Postal code: 44920
- Area code: 0422

Yakınca (formerly Kileyik) is a neighbourhood of the municipality and district of Yeşilyurt, Malatya Province, Turkey. Its population is 23,063 (2022). Before the 2013 reorganisation, it was a town (belde).
