= Öncü, Yeşilyurt =

Village in Turkey

Öncü
- Neighbourhood
- Location in Turkey
- Coordinates: 38.169°N 38.342°E
- Country: Turkey
- Province: Malatya
- District: Yeşilyurt
- Population (2025): 230
- Time zone: UTC+3 (TRT)

Öncü (Kurdish: Zernewê) is a neighbourhood in the municipality and district of Yeşilyurt, Malatya Province in Turkey. It is populated by Kurds of the Cêlikan and Reşwan tribes had a population of 230 in 2025.
