= Karakavak, Yeşilyurt =

Village in Turkey

Karakavak
- Neighbourhood
- Location in Turkey
- Coordinates: 38.336°N 38.262°E
- Country: Turkey
- Province: Malatya
- District: Yeşilyurt
- Population (2025): 11,508
- Time zone: UTC+3 (TRT)

Karakavak (Kurdish: Qereqawax) is a neighbourhood in the municipality and district of Yeşilyurt, Malatya Province in Turkey. It is populated by Kurds of the Reşwan tribe had a population of 11,508 in 2025.

Karakavak was once a small Kurdish village, but its close proximity to Malatya led to rapid population growth and leading it to become absorbed into the city.
