= Seyituşağı, Yeşilyurt =

Village in Turkey

Seyituşağı
- Neighbourhood
- Location in Turkey
- Coordinates: 38.263°N 38.175°E
- Country: Turkey
- Province: Malatya
- District: Yeşilyurt
- Population (2025): 186
- Time zone: UTC+3 (TRT)

Seyituşağı (Kurdish: Seyidan) is a neighbourhood in the municipality and district of Yeşilyurt, Malatya Province in Turkey. It is populated by Kurds had a population of 186 in 2025.
