= Yeşilyurt, Malatya =

Yeşilyurt
- District and municipality
- Logo

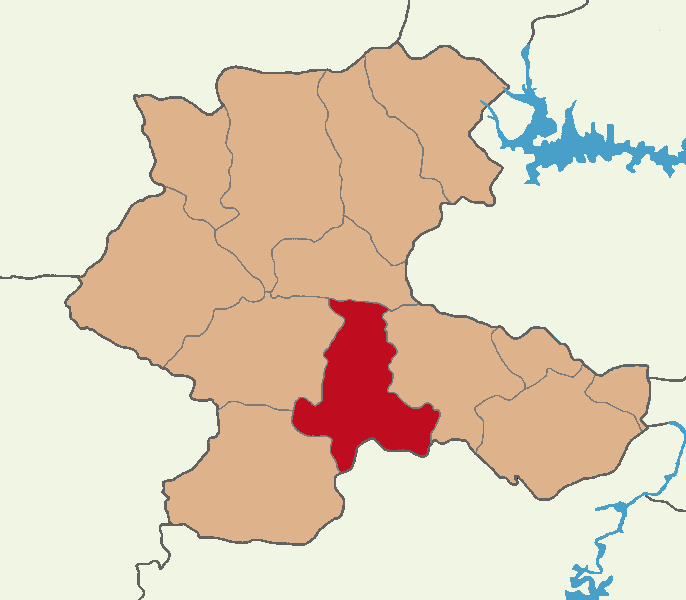
- Map showing Yeşilyurt District in Malatya Province

- Location within Turkey
- Coordinates: 38°17′46″N 38°14′56″E
- Country: Turkey
- Province: Malatya

Government
  - Mayor: İlhan Geçit (AKP)
- Area: 953 km^{2} (368 sq mi)
- Population (2022): 341,654
  - Density: 359/km^{2} (929/sq mi)
- Time zone: UTC+3 (TRT)
- Area code: 0422
- Website: www.yesilyurt.bel.tr

Yeşilyurt (Kurdish: Çirmixtî) is a municipality and district of Malatya Province, Turkey. Its area is 953 km^{2}, and its population is 341,654 (2022). At the 2013 reorganisation part of the former central district of Malatya Province was added to the district. It covers the western part of the agglomeration of Malatya and the adjacent countryside. The mayor is Mehmet Çınar (AKP).

It is populated by both Kurds and Turks. Yeşilyurt was once a small Kurdish village, but its close proximity to Malatya led to rapid population growth and leading it to become part of the city.

== Composition ==
There are 82 neighbourhoods in Yeşilyurt District:

- Abdulgaffar
- Aşağıbağlar
- Aşağıköy
- Atalar
- Atatürk
- Banazı
- Bentbaşı
- Bindal
- Bostanbaşı
- Cafana
- Çarmuzu
- Çavuşoğlu
- Çayırköy
- Cemalgürsel
- Cevatpaşa
- Çilesiz
- Çukurdere
- Cumhuriyet
- Cumhuriyet Örnek
- Dilek
- Duranlar
- Duruldu
- Fatih
- Gazi
- Gedik
- Göktarla
- Gözene
- Gündüzbey
- Hamidiye
- Hıroğlu
- Hoca Ahmet Yesevi
- Horata
- İkizce
- İlyas
- İnönü
- Işıklı
- Kadiruşağı
- Karahan
- Karakavak
- Kaynarca
- Kendirli
- Kiltepe
- Kırkpınar
- Kırlangıç
- Konak
- Koşu
- Koyunoğlu
- Kozluk
- Kuşdoğan
- Kuyulu
- Mahmutlu
- Melek Baba
- Merkez Fatih
- Mullakasım
- Oluklu
- Öncü
- Ortaköy
- Özal
- Özalper
- Şahnanan
- Salkonak
- Salköprü
- Samanköy
- Samanlı
- Şeyh Bayram
- Seyituşağı
- Seyran
- Suluköy
- Sütlüce
- Tecde
- Tepeköy
- Tohma
- Topraktepe
- Topsöğüt
- Turgut Özal
- Üçgöze
- Yaka
- Yakınca
- Yalınkaya
- Yavuz Selim
- Yeşil Kaynak
- Zaviye
