= Metropolitan municipalities in Turkey =

Turkish municipalities in bigger provinces

There are 81 provinces in Turkey (Turkish: il). Among the 81 provinces, 30 provinces are designated metropolitan municipalities (Turkish: büyükşehir belediyeleri). Metropolitan municipalities are subdivided into districts (Turkish: ilçe), where each district includes a corresponding district municipality, which is a second tier municipality.

== History ==
The first metropolitan municipalities were established in 1984. These were the three most populous cities in Turkey, namely, Istanbul, Ankara, and İzmir. In each metropolitan municipality a number of second level municipalities (ilçe municipality) were established. In 1986, four new metropolitan municipalities were established: Adana, Bursa, Gaziantep and Konya. Two years later the total number was increased to eight with the addition of Kayseri. In 1993, seven new metropolitan municipalities were established: Antalya, Diyarbakır, Erzurum, Eskişehir, Mersin, Kocaeli and Samsun. Following the earthquake of 1999, Sakarya was also declared a metropolitan municipality.

Before 2004, only the urban centers with populations of more than 750,000 were declared metropolitan centers. However, in 2004, the concept of metropolitan municipality was redefined in Istanbul and Kocaeli, where thenceforth metropolitan municipality borders would overlap with provincial borders. In 2012, this was extended to other metropolitan municipalities. Thus, all provinces with a population in excess of 750,000 were declared metropolitan municipalities and accordingly the number of metropolitan municipalities has sharply increased. The following 13 cities became metropolitan municipalities:

- Aydın
- Balıkesir
- Denizli
- Hatay
- Malatya
- Manisa
- Kahramanmaraş
- Mardin
- Muğla
- Tekirdağ
- Trabzon
- Şanlıurfa
- Van

With the addition of Ordu in 2013, the total number of the metropolitan municipalities increased to 30.

== List of metropolitan areas ==
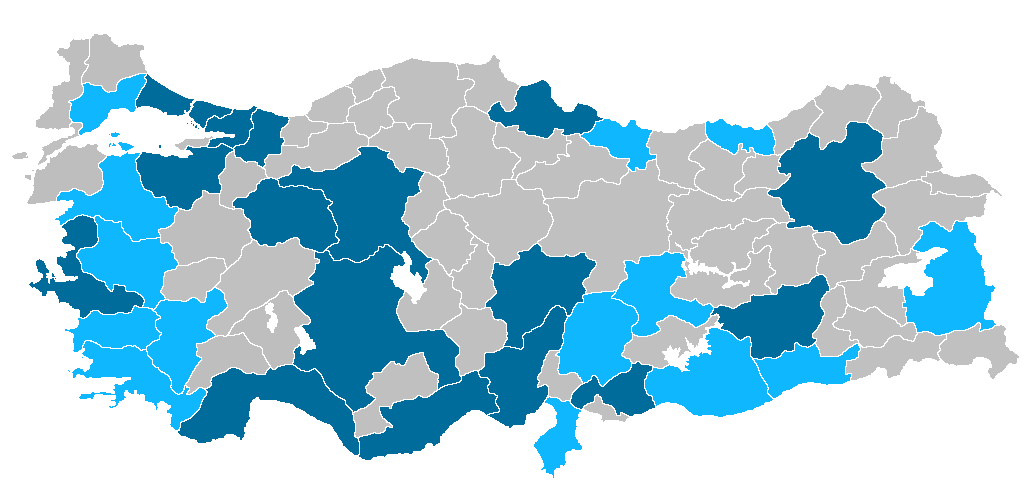

(Dark blue: Those provinces before 2012, light blue those after 2012)

Metropolitan municipalities	Date of establishment	Area (km^{2})	GDP (billion US$)	Population (2021)	Number of districts
Adana	05.06.1986	13,844	15.775	2,263,373	15
Ankara	23.03.1984	25,632	74.285	5,747,325	25
Antalya	09.09.1993	20,177	23.213	2,619,832	19
Aydın	06.12.2012	8,116	7.260	1,134,031	17
Balıkesir	06.12.2012	14,583	10.027	1,250,610	20
Bursa	18.06.1986	10,813	33.641	3,147,818	17
Denizli	06.12.2012	12,134	9.062	1,051,056	19
Diyarbakır	09.09.1993	15,101	6.959	1,791,373	17
Erzurum	09.09.1993	25,006	3.918	756,893	20
Eskişehir	09.09.1993	13,960	9.078	898,369	14
Gaziantep	20.06.1986	6,830	16.545	2,130,432	9
Hatay	06.12.2012	5,524	11.298	1,670,712	15
Mersin (Note: Formerly named İçel.)	09.09.1993	15,010	15.562	1,891,145	13
İstanbul	23.03.1984	5,343	245.207	15,840,000	39
İzmir	23.03.1984	11,891	51.460	4,425,789	30
Kayseri	07.12.1988	16,970	11.956	1,434,357	16
Kocaeli (Note: Formerly the center city of Kocaeli Province was İzmit, which is now a district)	09.09.1993	3,397	34.442	2,033,441	12
Konya	20.06.1986	40,838	16.616	2,277,017	31
Malatya	06.12.2012	12,259	4.324	808,692	13
Manisa	06.12.2012	13,339	13.633	1,456,626	17
Kahramanmaraş	06.12.2012	14,520	7.015	1,171,298	11
Mardin	06.12.2012	8,780	4.737	862,757	10
Muğla	06.12.2012	12,654	9.444	1,021,141	13
Ordu	14.03.2013	5,914	3.685	760,872	19
Sakarya (Note: Formerly the center city of Sakarya Province was Adapazarı, which is now a district)	06.03.2000	4,824	9.102	1,060,876	16
Samsun	09.09.1993	9,725	8.332	1,371,274	17
Tekirdağ	06.12.2012	6,190	16.225	1,113,400	11
Trabzon	06.12.2012	4,628	4.897	816,686	18
Şanlıurfa	06.12.2012	19,242	6.413	2,143,020	13
Van	06.12.2012	20,921	3.544	1,141,015	13
Turkey		783,562	807.143	66,092,128	519

Since the total population of Turkey is 83,154,997, the population in the 30 provinces make up 77% of the population of the country.

== See also ==
- 2013 Turkish local government reorganisation
- Elections for Metropolitan municipalities in Turkey – Turkish metropolitan municipality election results
- Provinces of Turkey by population
