= Provinces of Turkey by population =

According to data obtained from the Address-Based Population Registration System, as of the beginning of 2024, Turkey's population is 85,372,377. This figure was 13.6 million when the first official population census was conducted in 1927. The figure in 2023 was 92,824 more than the figure in 2022, and the population growth rate was 0.11%. According to the same data, there is an average of 111 people per km^{2} in Turkey.

While 68.3% of the population is in the 15–64 age group, 21.4% are in the 0–14 age group. Approximately 10.2% of the population consists of people aged 65 and over. The median age of Turkey's population is 34. Istanbul is Turkey's most developed and most populous city. It also holds the title of the most populous city in Europe.

== List of provinces ==
The population data below is taken from the Turkish Statistical Institute and is based on the 2023 address-based population registration system data.

No.	Province	Region	Population	Year	Ranking change 2022–2023	Change
1	Istanbul	Marmara	15,655,924	2023	Steady	▼ -252,027
2	Ankara	Central Anatolia	5,803,482	2023	Steady	▲21,197
3	Izmir	Aegean	4,479,525	2023	Steady	▲17,469
4	Bursa	Marmara	3,214,571	2023	Steady	▲19,851
5	Antalya	Mediterranean	2,696,249	2023	Steady	▲8,245
6	Konya	Central Anatolia	2,320,241	2023	Steady	▲23,894
7	Adana	Mediterranean	2,270,298	2023	Steady	▼ -3,808
8	Şanlıurfa	Southeastern Anatolia	2,213,964	2023	Steady	▲43,854
9	Gaziantep	Southeastern Anatolia	2,164,134	2023	Steady	▲10,083
10	Kocaeli	Marmara	2,102,907	2023	Steady	▲23,835
11	Mersin	Mediterranean	1,938,389	2023	Steady	▲21,957
12	Diyarbakır	Southeastern Anatolia	1,818,133	2023	Steady	▲13,253
13	Hatay	Mediterranean	1,544,640	2023	Steady	▼ -141,403
14	Manisa	Aegean	1,475,716	2023	Steady	▲7,437
15	Kayseri	Central Anatolia	1,445,683	2023	Steady	▲4,160
16	Samsun	Black Sea	1,377,546	2023	Steady	▲9,058
17	Balıkesir	Marmara	1,273,519	2023	Steady	▲15,929
18	Tekirdağ	Marmara	1,167,059	2023	▲2	▲24,608
19	Aydın	Aegean	1,161,702	2023	Steady	▲13,461
20	Van	Eastern Anatolia	1,127,612	2023	▲1	▼ -1,137
21	Kahramanmaraş	Mediterranean	1,116,618	2023	▼3	▼ -60,818
22	Sakarya	Marmara	1,098,115	2023	Steady	▲18,035
23	Muğla	Aegean	1,066,736	2023	▲1	▲18,551
24	Denizli	Aegean	1,059,082	2023	▼1	▲2,750
25	Eskişehir	Central Anatolia	915,418	2023	Steady	▲8,801
26	Mardin	Southeastern Anatolia	888,874	2023	Steady	▲18,500
27	Trabzon	Black Sea	824,352	2023	Steady	▲6,329
28	Ordu	Black Sea	775,800	2023	▲1	▲12,610
29	Afyonkarahisar	Aegean	751,344	2023	▲2	▲3,789
30	Erzurum	Eastern Anatolia	749,993	2023	Steady	▲239
31	Malatya	Eastern Anatolia	742,725	2023	▼3	▼ -69,855
32	Sivas	Central Anatolia	650,401	2023	▲1	
33	Batman	Southeastern Anatolia	647,205	2023	▲1	
34	Tokat	Black Sea	606,934	2023	▲1	
35	Adıyaman	Southeastern Anatolia	604,978	2023	▼3	
36	Elazığ	Eastern Anatolia	604,411	2023	Steady	
37	Zonguldak	Black Sea	591,492	2023	Steady	
38	Kütahya	Aegean	575,674	2023	Steady	
39	Şırnak	Southeastern Anatolia	570,745	2023	▲2	
40	Çanakkale	Marmara	570,499	2023	Steady	
41	Osmaniye	Mediterranean	557,666	2023	▼2	
42	Çorum	Black Sea	528,351	2023	Steady	
43	Ağrı	Eastern Anatolia	511,238	2023	Steady	
44	Giresun	Black Sea	461,712	2023	Steady	
45	Isparta	Mediterranean	449,777	2023	Steady	
46	Aksaray	Central Anatolia	438,504	2023	Steady	
47	Yozgat	Central Anatolia	420,699	2023	Steady	
48	Edirne	Marmara	419,913	2023	Steady	
49	Düzce	Black Sea	409,865	2023	Steady	
50	Muş	Eastern Anatolia	399,879	2023	Steady	
51	Kastamonu	Black Sea	388,990	2023	Steady	
52	Kırklareli	Marmara	377,156	2023	▲1	
53	Niğde	Central Anatolia	377,080	2023	▲1	
53	Uşak	Aegean	377,001	2023	▼2	
55	Bitlis	Eastern Anatolia	359,747	2023	Steady	
56	Rize	Black Sea	350,506	2023	Steady	
57	Siirt	Southeastern Anatolia	347,412	2023	▲1	
58	Amasya	Black Sea	339,529	2023	▼1	
59	Bolu	Black Sea	324,789	2023	Steady	
60	Nevşehir	Central Anatolia	315,994	2023	Steady	
61	Yalova	Marmara	304,780	2023	Steady	
62	Hakkâri	Eastern Anatolia	287,625	2023	▲2	
63	Kırıkkale	Central Anatolia	285,744	2023	Steady	
64	Bingöl	Eastern Anatolia	285,655	2023	▼2	
65	Kars	Eastern Anatolia	278,335	2023	Steady	
66	Burdur	Mediterranean	277,452	2023	Steady	
67	Karaman	Central Anatolia	263,960	2023	Steady	
68	Karabük	Black Sea	255,242	2023	Steady	
69	Kırşehir	Central Anatolia	247,179	2023	Steady	
70	Erzincan	Eastern Anatolia	243,399	2023	Steady	
71	Sinop	Black Sea	229,716	2023	▲1	
72	Bilecik	Marmara	228,058	2023	▼1	
73	Iğdır	Eastern Anatolia	209,738	2023	Steady	
74	Bartın	Black Sea	207,238	2023	Steady	
75	Çankırı	Central Anatolia	205,501	2023	Steady	
76	Artvin	Black Sea	172,356	2023	Steady	
77	Kilis	Southeastern Anatolia	155,179	2023	Steady	
78	Gümüşhane	Black Sea	148,539	2023	Steady	
79	Ardahan	Eastern Anatolia	92,819	2023	Steady	
80	Tunceli	Eastern Anatolia	89,317	2023	Steady	
81	Bayburt	Black Sea	86,047	2023	Steady	
