= Belde =

Type of municipality

Belde (literally "town", also known as kasaba) means "large village with a municipality" in Turkish.

All Turkish province centers and district centers have municipalities, but the villages are usually too small to have municipalities. The population in some villages may exceed 2000 and in such villages a small municipality may be established depending on residents' choice. Such villages are called belde. Up to 2014 the number of belde municipalities was about 1400.

On 30 March 2014 by the act no. 6360 all villages (those with and without municipality) were included in the urban fabric of the district municipalities in 30 provinces. Thus belde municipalities in 30 provinces were abolished. The number of abolished belde municipalities is 1040.

Presently, in 51 provinces, which are not in the scope of the act no 6360, there are still 394 belde municipalities.

== See also ==
- 2013 Turkish local government reorganisation
- Metropolitan municipalities in Turkey
