= 1998 Enfield London Borough Council election =

1998 local election in England

- 7 May 1998

All 66 seats up for election to Enfield London Borough Council 34 seats needed for a majority
- Registered: 200,913
- Turnout: 66,903, 33.30% (▼13.83)

	First party	Second party
Leader	Jeffrey L. Rodin	Unknown
Party	Labour	Conservative
Leader since	1994	Unknown
Leader's seat	Bowes	Unknown
Last election	41 seats, 47.56%	25 seats, 39.44%
Seats before	38	26
Seats won	43	23
Seat change	▲2	▼2
Popular vote	58,663	48,649
Percentage	47.89%	37.92%
Swing	▲0.33	▼0.28
	Third party	Fourth party
Leader	Unknown	N/A
Party	Liberal Democrats	Independent
Leader since	Unknown	N/A
Leader's seat	Unknown	N/A
Last election	0 seats, 12.52%	0 seats, 0.23%
Seats before	0	2
Seats won	0	0
Seat change	Steady	Steady
Popular vote	13,671	652
Percentage	11.16%	0.53%
Swing	▼1.36	▲0.30
Council control before election
Labour
Council control after election
Labour

The 1998 Enfield Council election took place on 7 May 1998 to elect members of Enfield London Borough Council in London, England. The whole council was up for election and the Labour Party stayed in overall control of the council. This was the first time that Labour were re-elected for a second term in Enfield. They later won a historic third term in 2018 after winning again in Enfield in 2010 and 2014.

== Background ==
In the years since the last election, Labour lost 3 councillors. 2 of these defected to either be independents or smaller parties and 1 seat was lost to the Conservatives in a by-election held in 1997.

Just before the election the composition of the council was a follows:

↓
38	26	2
Labour	Conservative	Independent

== Election result ==
At the same as the election Enfield saw 67.2% vote in favour of the 1998 Greater London Authority referendum and 32.8% against, on a 32.8% turnout. Overall turnout at the election was 33.26%.

Enfield local election result 1998
Party	Seats	Gains	Losses	Net gain/loss	Seats %	Votes %	Votes	+/−
Labour	43	4	2	▲2	65.15	47.89	58,663	▲0.33
Conservative	23	2	4	▼2	34.85	39.72	48,649	▼0.28
Liberal Democrats	0	0	0	Steady	0.00	11.16	13,671	▼1.36
Independent Labour	0	0	0	Steady	0.00	0.64	782	New
Independent	0	0	0	Steady	0.00	0.53	652	▲0.30
Green	0	0	0	Steady	0.00	0.06	74	▼0.12
Total	66						122,491	

== Ward results ==
(*) - Indicates an incumbent candidate

(†) - Indicates an incumbent candidate standing in a different ward

=== Angel Road ===
Angel Road (2)
Party	Candidate	Votes	%	±%
Labour	John Connew*	846	67.69	▲2.07
Labour	Elizabeth Costello^{†} (Note: Costello was a sitting councillor representing the Ponders End ward)	669		
Conservative	Jean Cannell	285	24.62	▼2.30
Conservative	Andrena Smith	266		
Liberal Democrats	Margaret Schofield	86	7.69	▲0.23
Registered electors		4,695		▼113
Turnout		1,250	26.62	▼15.43
Rejected ballots		9	0.72	▲0.52
Labour hold				
Labour hold				

=== Arnos ===
Arnos (2)
Party	Candidate	Votes	%	±%
Labour	Yasmine Brett*	989	56.58	▼3.24
Labour	Ian Borkett^{†} (Note: Borkett was a sitting councillor representing the Highfield ward)	958		
Conservative	David Conway^{†} (Note: Conway was a sitting councillor representing the Oakwood ward)	241	13.89	▼15.88
Conservative	Lulu Bernard	237		
Independent	Richard Course	203	11.80	New
Independent	Patrick Cunneen^{†} (Note: Cunneen was a sitting councillor representing the Bullsmoor ward)	178	10.35	New
Liberal Democrats	David Osman	129	7.38	▼3.03
Liberal Democrats	Stanley Summerfield	125		
Registered electors		5,613		▲286
Turnout		1,673	29.81	▼14.00
Rejected ballots		38	2.27	▲2.01
Labour hold				
Labour hold				

=== Bowes ===
Bowes (2)
Party	Candidate	Votes	%	±%
Labour	Archilleas Georgiou*	1,122	70.50	▲8.58
Labour	Jeffrey Rodin*	1,110		
Conservative	Malcom Tyndall	309	19.14	▼7.86
Conservative	Lionel Zetter	297		
Liberal Democrats	Glenton Haddock	185	10.36	▼0.72
Liberal Democrats	Mohammed Alam	143		
Registered electors		6,066		▲422
Turnout		1,742	28.72	▼17.01
Rejected ballots		8	0.46	▲0.27
Labour hold				
Labour hold				

=== Bullsmoor ===
Bullsmoor (2)
Party	Candidate	Votes	%	±%
Labour	John Gorton^{†} (Note: Gorton was a sitting councillor representing the Enfield Lock ward. He was elected in a by-election triggered by the death of Cllr Patrick Horridge in 1995)	985	53.66	▼3.49
Labour	Danny Neary	982		
Conservative	Annette Dreblow	726	39.14	▼3.71
Conservative	Eric Jukes	709		
Liberal Democrats	Jean Digby	140	7.20	New
Liberal Democrats	Thomas Digby	124		
Registered electors		6,008		▼39
Turnout		1,964	32.69	▼17.88
Rejected ballots		8	0.41	▲0.08
Labour hold				
Labour hold				

=== Chase ===
Chase (2)
Party	Candidate	Votes	%	±%
Conservative	Peggy Ford	922	45.56	▼1.48
Conservative	John Yates*	858		
Labour	George Reeve	858	41.68	▲6.75
Labour	Paul Renny	811		
Liberal Democrats	Angus Macleod	264	12.76	▼5.27
Liberal Democrats	Margaret Marchant	247		
Registered electors		6,001		▼99
Turnout		2,020	33.66	▼15.68
Rejected ballots		5	0.25	▲0.12
Conservative hold				
Conservative hold				

=== Craig Park ===
Craig Park (2)
Party	Candidate	Votes	%	±%
Labour	Mark Fenton*	871	66.53	▼4.50
Labour	Alexander Mattingly*	723		
Conservative	Michael Harding	333	26.63	▲6.52
Conservative	Florence Seaman	305		
Liberal Democrats	Philip Broadbent	82	6.84	▼2.02
Registered electors		5,455		▲121
Turnout		1,333	24.44	▼11.41
Rejected ballots		20	1.50	▲1.29
Labour hold				
Labour hold				

=== Enfield Lock ===
Enfield Lock (2)
Party	Candidate	Votes	%	±%
Labour	Bernadette Lappage	1,204	51.70	▼3.56
Labour	Mark Sutters	1,059		
Conservative	James Lee	894	39.25	▼5.49
Conservative	James Steven	824		
Liberal Democrats	Timothy Hoof	200	9.05	New
Liberal Democrats	Jacqueline Stone	196		
Registered electors		6,997		▲155
Turnout		2,403	34.34	▼12.15
Rejected ballots		13	0.54	▲0.23
Labour hold				
Labour hold				

=== Enfield Wash ===
Enfield Wash (2)
Party	Candidate	Votes	%	±%
Labour	Roger Buckley*	819	59.92	▼1.88
Labour	Brian Grayston	758		
Conservative	Gillian Shadbolt	434	32.10	▼6.10
Conservative	John Boast	411		
Liberal Democrats	Tina Macintosh	107	7.98	New
Liberal Democrats	Simon Price	103		
Registered electors		5,759		▲102
Turnout		1,455	25.26	▼15.68
Rejected ballots		3	0.21	▼0.39
Labour hold				
Labour hold				

=== Grange ===
Grange (2)
Party	Candidate	Votes	%	±%
Conservative	Nigel Gilmore	1,633	62.95	▲12.29
Conservative	Glynis Vince*	1,605		
Labour	Hazel Kinsler	669	25.06	▲8.35
Labour	Gladys Stanbridge	620		
Liberal Democrats	Michael Steel	313	11.99	▼17.71
Liberal Democrats	Robert Martin	304		
Registered electors		6,893		▲415
Turnout		2,728	39.58	▼14.94
Rejected ballots		10	0.37	▲0.20
Conservative hold				
Conservative hold				

=== Green Street ===
Green Street (2)
Party	Candidate	Votes	%	±%
Labour	Douglas Taylor	1,037	55.26	▼2.60
Labour	Ayfer Orhan	1,010		
Conservative	Bill Price	769	39.93	▼2.21
Conservative	Mary Gosnell	710		
Liberal Democrats	George Hollis	107	4.81	New
Liberal Democrats	Wendy Zlotnick	71		
Registered electors		5,670		▲2
Turnout		2,039	35.96	▼11.71
Rejected ballots		11	0.54	▲0.10
Labour hold				
Labour hold				

=== Grovelands ===
Grovelands (2)
Party	Candidate	Votes	%	±%
Conservative	Peter Rust*	932	41.81	▼3.70
Conservative	Jonathan French	921		
Labour	Stephen Mann	744	32.99	▲0.69
Labour	Mary Wright	718		
Liberal Democrats	David Schofield	564	25.20	▲3.01
Liberal Democrats	Androulla Morphakis	553		
Registered electors		6,261		▲692
Turnout		2,408	38.46	▼8.51
Rejected ballots		18	0.75	▲0.48
Conservative hold				
Conservative hold				

=== Highfield ===
Highfield (2)
Party	Candidate	Votes	%	±%
Labour	Christopher Cole*	881	43.77	▼9.32
Conservative	Alan Barker	739	38.15	▼0.68
Labour	George Watts	652		
Conservative	Raymond McCully	597		
Independent Labour	Philomena Cosgrove	215	9.65	New
Liberal Democrats	Helen Osmen	192	8.42	▲0.34
Independent Labour	Frances Cunneen	123		
Liberal Democrats	Ivor Zeitman	103		
Registered electors		5,861		▲245
Turnout		1,923	32.81	▼17.51
Rejected ballots		18	0.94	▲0.69
Labour hold				
Conservative gain from Labour				

=== Hoe Lane ===
Hoe Lane (2)
Party	Candidate	Votes	%	±%
Labour	Verna Horridge*	802	58.18	▲2.77
Labour	Geoffrey Southwell*	698		
Conservative	Helen Reid	442	32.74	▼1.68
Conservative	Anthony Phelan	402		
Liberal Democrats	Eileen Robeson	129	9.08	▼1.08
Liberal Democrats	Neil Savage	105		
Registered electors		6,153		▼71
Turnout		1,460	23.73	▼21.80
Rejected ballots		10	0.68	▲0.64
Labour hold				
Labour hold				

=== Huxley ===
Huxley (2)
Party	Candidate	Votes	%	±%
Labour	George Savva*	1,346	73.83	▼10.71
Labour	Brian Barford*	1,246		
Conservative	Mark Jackson	414	21.45	▼6.71
Conservative	George Paleologos	339		
Liberal Democrats	Janet Arend	92	4.73	▼3.99
Liberal Democrats	John Arend	74		
Registered electors		5,883		▲100
Turnout		2,009	34.15	▼11.93
Rejected ballots		16	0.80	▲0.57
Labour hold				
Labour hold				

=== Jubilee ===
Jubilee (2)
Party	Candidate	Votes	%	±%
Labour	Rita Smythe*	1,064	60.83	▼1.48
Labour	Derek Goddard^{†} (Note: Goddard was a sitting councillor representing the St Alphege ward. He was elected in a by-election triggered by the death of Cllr Leonard Nicholls in 1996)	1,029		
Conservative	Patricia Dawson^{†} (Note: Dawson was a sitting councillor representing the Oakwood ward)	509	29.41	▲2.53
Conservative	Peter Hicks	503		
Liberal Democrats	David Peters	168	9.76	▼1.04
Registered electors		6,110		▲374
Turnout		1,828	29.92	▼17.51
Rejected ballots		6	0.33	▲0.22
Labour hold				
Labour hold				

=== Latymer ===
Latymer (2)
Party	Candidate	Votes	%	±%
Labour	Andrew Stafford^{†} (Note: Stafford was a sitting councillor representing the St Marks ward)	864	68.98	▲3.97
Labour	Phillip Sowter*	833		
Conservative	Joan Scrine	272	21.06	▲1.43
Conservative	Ahmet Mustafa	246		
Liberal Democrats	Robert Clark	131	9.96	▲1.13
Liberal Democrats	Elizabeth Hicks	114		
Registered electors		5,417		▲140
Turnout		1,364	25.18	▼17.29
Rejected ballots		8	0.59	▲0.32
Labour hold				
Labour hold				

=== Merryhills ===
Merryhills (2)
Party	Candidate	Votes	%	±%
Conservative	Dogan Delman	1,185	55.33	▲0.21
Conservative	Edward Smith	1,124		
Labour	Anthony Cleary	678	30.60	▲3.29
Labour	Vasilios Sotiriou	599		
Liberal Democrats	Linda Wilkinson	309	14.07	▼3.50
Liberal Democrats	Terence McGee	278		
Registered electors		6,236		▲1,018
Turnout		2,280	36.56	▼13.17
Rejected ballots		15	0.66	▲0.43
Conservative hold				
Conservative hold				

=== Oakwood ===
Oakwood (2)
Party	Candidate	Votes	%	±%
Labour	Lynette Romain	828	43.01	▲8.20
Conservative	Michael Lavender	799	43.31	▼4.99
Conservative	Inese Aivars	749		
Labour	Surinder Attariwala	709		
Liberal Democrats	Stephen Williams	258	13.68	▼3.21
Liberal Democrats	John Hill	231		
Registered electors		5,545		▲196
Turnout		1,949	35.15	▼8.54
Rejected ballots		4	0.21	▼0.13
Labour gain from Conservative				
Conservative hold				

=== Palmers Green ===
Palmers Green (2)
Party	Candidate	Votes	%	±%
Labour	Neil Aves*	1,101	46.30	▼6.69
Labour	Charalambos Charalambous*	1,095		
Conservative	Erdogan Dervish	782	32.70	▲0.82
Conservative	Anthony Wright^{†} (Note: Wright was a sitting councillor representing the Grovelands ward)	769		
Liberal Democrats	Ian Swinton	273	9.57	▼5.56
Independent	Andrew Malakouna	271	11.43	New
Liberal Democrats	David Rebak	181		
Registered electors		6,641		▲269
Turnout		2,499	37.63	▼13.12
Rejected ballots		5	0.20	▲0.17
Labour hold				
Labour hold				

=== Ponders End ===
Ponders End (2)
Party	Candidate	Votes	%	±%
Labour	Forston Fairclough	821	53.55	▼16.16
Labour	Christopher Bond^{†} (Note: Bond was a sitting councillor representing the Enfield Lock ward)	809		
Conservative	Frank Thacker	346	21.68	▼8.61
Conservative	Stephen Wortley^{†} (Note: Wortley was a sitting councillor representing the Town ward)	314		
Independent Labour	Raja Ali	255	14.59	New
Independent Labour	Kaya Hafil	189		
Liberal Democrats	Patricia Belton	165	10.18	New
Liberal Democrats	Jean Butterworth	145		
Registered electors		6,372		▲805
Turnout		1,685	26.44	▼13.64
Rejected ballots		20	1.19	▲0.92
Labour hold				
Labour hold				

=== Raglan ===
Raglan (2)
Party	Candidate	Votes	%	±%
Labour	Tobias Simon	1,309	49.45	▲7.54
Labour	Mark Walton	1,165		
Conservative	Celia Gooch*	1,090	41.81	▼4.91
Conservative	Terence Smith	1,002		
Liberal Democrats	Michael Spinks	239	8.73	▼2.63
Liberal Democrats	Boris Whycer	198		
Registered electors		7,120		▲354
Turnout		2,669	37.49	▼11.18
Rejected ballots		1	0.04	▼0.14
Labour gain from Conservative				
Labour gain from Conservative				

=== St Alphege ===
St Alphege (2)
Party	Candidate	Votes	%	±%
Labour	Clive Morrison	1,054	68.29	▲6.22
Labour	Christopher Murphy	927		
Conservative	Audrey Stacey	358	23.71	▼4.85
Conservative	Roger Vince	330		
Liberal Democrats	Harold Nelson	117	8.00	▼1.37
Liberal Democrats	Brendan Malone	115		
Registered electors		6,063		▲94
Turnout		1,624	26.79	▼15.70
Rejected ballots		11	0.68	▲0.60
Labour hold				
Labour hold				

=== St Marks ===
St Marks (2)
Party	Candidate	Votes	%	±%
Labour	Wendell Daniel	1,100	54.93	▲0.23
Labour	Ivor Wiggett^{†} (Note: Wiggett was a sitting councillor representing the Ponders End ward)	905		
Conservative	Celia McNeice	695	35.21	▼1.32
Conservative	Lefteris Sawa	590		
Liberal Democrats	Elizabeth Lea	180	9.86	▲1.09
Registered electors		5,162		▲158
Turnout		1,960	37.97	▼18.48
Rejected ballots		14	0.71	▲0.53
Labour hold				
Labour hold				

=== St Peters ===
St Peters (2)
Party	Candidate	Votes	%	±%
Labour	Colin Robb*	898	63.38	▼1.87
Labour	Eric Smythe*	857		
Conservative	Anne Davis	352	24.34	▲0.31
Conservative	Lawrence Davis	322		
Liberal Democrats	Robert Curry	109	6.94	▼3.79
Liberal Democrats	Penelope Marno	83		
Green	Joanna Steranka	74	5.34	New
Registered electors		5,835		▲144
Turnout		1,551	26.58	▼14.63
Rejected ballots		16	1.03	▲0.94
Labour hold				
Labour hold				

=== Southbury ===
Southbury (2)
Party	Candidate	Votes	%	±%
Labour	Stanley Catyer*	1,175	49.92	▲1.20
Labour	Irene Richards	1,155		
Conservative	Oliver Grigg	932	39.62	▲1.15
Conservative	Lee Chamberlain	917		
Liberal Democrats	Kenneth Keen	270	10.46	▼2.35
Liberal Democrats	Alfrida Lee	218		
Registered electors		7,028		▲581
Turnout		2,518	35.83	▼16.27
Rejected ballots		13	0.52	▲0.46
Labour hold				
Labour hold				

=== Southgate Green ===
Southgate Green (2)
Party	Candidate	Votes	%	±%
Labour	Daniel Anderson	920	43.34	▲11.05
Conservative	Pamela Adams*	917	43.39	▼3.27
Conservative	Mark Babington	833		
Labour	Josepha Scotney	828		
Liberal Democrats	Alan Stainer	281	13.27	▼7.78
Liberal Democrats	Lorice Stainer	254		
Registered electors		6,115		▲431
Turnout		2,195	35.90	▼6.99
Rejected ballots		21	0.96	▲0.84
Labour gain from Conservative				
Conservative hold				

=== Town ===
Town (2)
Party	Candidate	Votes	%	±%
Conservative	John Egan	1,180	51.74	▲2.81
Conservative	Alasdair Macphail	1,091		
Labour	Laurane Morris	825	34.75	▲0.99
Labour	Rupert Price	700		
Liberal Democrats	Sheila Macleod	338	13.51	▼3.80
Liberal Democrats	Robin Lambie	255		
Registered electors		5,892		▲242
Turnout		2,307	39.15	▼16.00
Rejected ballots		6	0.26	Steady
Conservative hold				
Conservative hold				

=== Trent ===
Trent (2)
Party	Candidate	Votes	%	±%
Conservative	David Burrowes*	1,277	60.08	▼1.03
Conservative	Anne Pearce*	1,230		
Labour	Richard Barnes	496	22.98	▲3.16
Labour	Timothy Leaver	463		
Liberal Democrats	Susan Finlay	381	16.94	▼2.13
Liberal Democrats	Michael Orsulik	326		
Registered electors		6,813		▲202
Turnout		2,241	32.89	▼10.34
Rejected ballots		7	0.31	▲0.03
Conservative hold				
Conservative hold				

=== Village ===
Village (2)
Party	Candidate	Votes	%	±%
Conservative	John Jackson*	1,311	55.00	▲2.21
Conservative	John Wyatt*	1,229		
Labour	Peter King	802	34.11	▲1.58
Labour	Emine Ali	773		
Liberal Democrats	Andrew Macintosh	261	10.89	▼3.79
Liberal Democrats	Stephen Savva	242		
Registered electors		6,582		▲361
Turnout		2,442	37.10	▼12.39
Rejected ballots		5	0.20	▲0.10
Conservative hold				
Conservative hold				

=== Weir Hall ===
Weir Hall (2)
Party	Candidate	Votes	%	±%
Labour	Andreas Constantinides*	934	60.87	▼1.37
Labour	Joanne McCartney	911		
Conservative	Victor James^{†} (Note: James was a sitting councillor representing the Merryhills ward)	434	28.51	▼1.41
Conservative	Yunus Kemal	430		
Liberal Democrats	David Lambdon	161	10.62	▲2.78
Registered electors		6,056		▲313
Turnout		1,669	27.56	▼15.17
Rejected ballots		6	0.36	▲0.16
Labour hold				
Labour hold				

=== Willow ===
Willow (2)
Party	Candidate	Votes	%	±%
Conservative	Graham Eustance*	1,241	45.88	▲5.05
Conservative	Michael Rye*	1,150		
Liberal Democrats	Christopher Jephcott	909	32.62	▼2.50
Liberal Democrats	Trevor Stone	791		
Labour	Ian Hamilton	586	21.49	▼2.55
Labour	Sylvester Pais	534		
Registered electors		6,189		▲123
Turnout		2,781	44.93	▼11.61
Rejected ballots		9	0.32	▲0.20
Conservative hold				
Conservative hold				

=== Winchmore Hill ===
Winchmore Hill (2)
Party	Candidate	Votes	%	±%
Conservative	Dennis Keighley	1,136	48.50	▲11.22
Conservative	Terence Neville*	1,097		
Labour	Rebecca Harvey	952	39.44	▲12.79
Labour	Constantinos Lemonides	864		
Liberal Democrats	Stuart McGowan	293	12.05	▼2.45
Liberal Democrats	Margaret Steel	262		
Registered electors		5,882		▲161
Turnout		2,477	42.11	▼4.05
Rejected ballots		14	0.57	▲0.49
Conservative hold				
Conservative hold				

=== Worcesters ===
Worcesters (2)
Party	Candidate	Votes	%	±%
Conservative	Anthony Dey* (Note: Dey and Spreadbury were elected in a by-election triggered by the resignations of Cllrs William Chapman and Mark Evans in 1997)	1,203	50.45	▲6.79
Conservative	Austin Spreadbury*	1,150		
Labour	William Byrne	960	41.04	▼3.19
Labour	Thomas Evans	954		
Liberal Democrats	Joan Bell	217	8.51	▼3.60
Liberal Democrats	Fiona Macleod	180		
Registered electors		6,540		▲256
Turnout		2,457	37.57	▼17.36
Rejected ballots		5	0.20	Steady
Conservative hold				
Conservative gain from Labour				
