= Kürecik =

Kürecik may refer to:

- Kürecik, also known as Kepez, part of Akçadağ district in Turkey's Malatya Province
- Kürecik Radar Station, NATO base in Turkey
