= Environmental Audit Select Committee =

UK House of Commons select committee

The Environmental Audit Select Committee is a select committee of the House of Commons in the Parliament of the United Kingdom. The remit of the committee is to examine how government departments' policies and programmes will affect both the environment and sustainable development.

The Committee was founded in 1997 by the incoming Labour government as a cross departmental select committee with the idea that environmental issues affect a number of departments.

== Chairs ==
Committee chairs include those listed below.

Name	Start	End	Party	Constituency
John Horam	12 November 1997	16 July 2003	Conservative	Orpington
Peter Ainsworth	16 July 2003	14 December 2005	Conservative	East Surrey
Tim Yeo	15 December 2005	6 May 2010	Conservative	South Suffolk
Joan Walley	10 June 2010	30 March 2015	Labour	Stoke-on-Trent North
Huw Irranca-Davies	18 June 2015	25 January 2016	Labour Co-op	Ogmore
Mary Creagh	10 February 2016	6 November 2019	Labour	Wakefield
Philip Dunne	29 January 2020	30 May 2024	Conservative	Ludlow
Toby Perkins	11 September 2024	present	Labour	Chesterfield

== Membership ==
Membership of the committee is as follows:

Member	Party	Constituency
Toby Perkins MP (Chair)	Labour	Chesterfield
Julia Buckley MP	Labour	Shrewsbury
Jonathan Davies MP	Labour	Mid Derbyshire
Cat Eccles MP	Labour	Stourbridge
Barry Gardiner MP	Labour	Brent West
Sarah Gibson MP	Liberal Democrats	Chippenham
Alison Griffiths MP	Conservative	Bognor Regis and Littlehampton
Chris Hinchliff MP	Labour	North East Hertfordshire
Sojan Joseph MP	Labour	Ashford
Manuela Perteghella MP	Liberal Democrats	Stratford-on-Avon
Adrian Ramsay MP	Green	Waveney Valley
Martin Rhodes MP	Labour	Glasgow North
Roz Savage MP	Liberal Democrats	South Cotswolds
Blake Stephenson MP	Conservative	Mid Bedfordshire
John Whitby MP	Labour	Derbyshire Dales
Sammy Wilson MP	Democratic Unionist Party	East Antrim

=== Changes since 2024 ===
Date	Outgoing Member & Party	Constituency	→	New Member & Party	Constituency	Source
15 September 2025	Pippa Heylings MP (Liberal Democrats)	South Cambridgeshire	→	Roz Savage MP (Liberal Democrats)	South Cotswolds	Hansard
21 October 2025	Ellie Chowns MP (Green)	North Herefordshire	→	Carla Denyer MP (Green)	Bristol Central	Hansard
17 November 2025	Anna Gelderd MP (Labour)	South East Cornwall	→	Alison Hume MP (Labour)	Scarborough and Whitby	Hansard
17 November 2025	Alison Taylor MP (Labour)	Paisley and Renfrewshire North	→	Jonathan Davies MP (Labour)	Mid Derbyshire	Hansard
25 November 2025	Cameron Thomas MP (Liberal Democrats)	Tewkesbury	→	Manuela Perteghella MP (Liberal Democrats)	Stratford-on-Acon	Hansard
5 January 2026	Alison Hume MP (Labour)	Scarborough and Whitby	→	Sojan Joseph MP (Labour)	Ashford	Hansard
8 June 2026	Carla Denyer MP (Green)	Bristol Central	→	Adrian Ramsay MP (Green)	Waveney Valley	Hansard
2 November 2026	Olivia Blake MP (Labour)	Sheffield Hallam	→	Cat Eccles MP (Labour)	Stourbridge	Hansard

== 2019-2024 Parliament ==
The chair was elected on 29 January 2020, with the members of the committee being announced on 2 March 2020.

Member	Party	Constituency
Philip Dunne MP (Chair)	Conservative	Ludlow
Duncan Baker MP	Conservative	North Norfolk
Feryal Clark MP	Labour	Enfield North
Sir Christopher Chope MP	Conservative	Christchurch
Robert Goodwill MP	Conservative	Scarborough and Whitby
Ian Levy MP	Conservative	Blyth Valley
Marco Longhi MP	Conservative	Dudley North
Caroline Lucas MP	Green	Brighton Pavilion
Jerome Mayhew MP	Conservative	Broadland
Kerry McCarthy MP	Labour	Bristol East
John McNally MP	SNP	Falkirk
Matthew Offord MP	Conservative	Hendon
Alex Sobel MP	Labour and Co-op	Leeds North West
Shailesh Vara MP	Conservative	North West Cambridgeshire
Claudia Webbe MP	Labour (Note: Whip suspended from 28 September 2020.)	Leicester East
Nadia Whittome MP	Labour	Nottingham East

=== Changes 2019-2024 ===
Date	Outgoing Member & Party	Constituency	→	New Member & Party	Constituency	Source
8 June 2020	Kerry McCarthy MP (Labour)	Bristol East	→	Barry Gardiner MP (Labour)	Brent North	Hansard
12 October 2020	Shailesh Vara MP (Conservative)	North West Cambridgeshire	→	Cherilyn Mackrory MP (Conservative)	Truro and Falmouth	Hansard
22 February 2021	Feryal Clark MP (Labour)	Enfield North	→	Dan Carden MP (Labour)	Liverpool Walton	Hansard
22 February 2021	Alex Sobel MP (Labour)	Leeds North West	→	Helen Hayes MP (Labour)	Dulwich and West Norwood	Hansard
8 March 2021	Marco Longhi MP (Conservative)	Dudley North	→	James Gray MP (Conservative)	North Wiltshire	Hansard
5 January 2022	Dan Carden MP (Labour)	Liverpool Walton	→	Valerie Vaz MP (Labour)	Walsall South	Hansard
8 February 2022	Nadia Whittome MP (Labour)	Nottingham East	→	Clive Lewis MP (Labour)	Norwich South	Hansard
17 May 2022	Valerie Vaz MP (Labour)	Walsall South	→	Anna McMorrin MP (Labour)	Cardiff North	Hansard
11 July 2022	Robert Goodwill MP (Conservative)	Scarborough and Whitby	→	Chris Skidmore MP (Conservative)	Kingswood	Hansard
7 March 2023	Helen Hayes MP (Labour)	Dulwich and West Norwood	→	Cat Smith MP (Labour)	Lancaster and Fleetwood	Hansard
8 January 2024	Chris Skidmore MP (Independent)	Kingswood	→	Vacant		Resignation from Parliament
22 January 2024	Vacant		→	Chris Grayling MP (Conservative)	Epsom and Ewell	Hansard

== 2017-2019 Parliament ==
The chair was elected on 12 July 2017, with the members of the committee being announced on 11 September 2017.

Member	Party	Constituency
Mary Creagh MP (Chair)	Labour	Wakefield
Dr Thérèse Coffey MP	Conservative	Suffolk Coastal
Geraint Davies MP	Labour (Co-op)	Swansea West
Zac Goldsmith MP	Conservative	Richmond Park
Caroline Lucas MP	Green	Brighton Pavilion
Kerry McCarthy MP	Labour	Bristol East
Anna McMorrin MP	Labour	Cardiff North
John McNally MP	SNP	Falkirk
Dr Matthew Offord MP	Conservative	Hendon
Dr Dan Poulter MP	Conservative	Central Suffolk and North Ipswich
Joan Ryan MP	Labour	Enfield North
Alex Sobel MP	Labour and Co-op	Leeds North West

=== Changes 2017-2019 ===
Date	Outgoing Member & Party	Constituency	→	New Member & Party	Constituency	Source
4 December 2017	Vacant		→	Glyn Davies MP (Conservative)	Montgomeryshire	Hansard
4 December 2017	Vacant		→	Colin Clark MP (Conservative)	Gordon	Hansard
22 January 2018	Vacant		→	Robert Goodwill MP (Conservative)	Scarborough and Whitby	Hansard
22 January 2018	Vacant		→	Philip Dunne MP (Conservative)	Ludlow	Hansard
4 June 2018	Glyn Davies MP (Conservative)	Montgomeryshire	→	James Gray MP (Conservative)	North Wiltshire	Hansard
25 February 2019	Joan Ryan MP (TIG)	Enfield North	→	Alex Cunningham MP (Labour)	Stockton North	Hansard
8 May 2019	Alex Cunningham MP (Labour)	Stockton North	→	Ruth Jones MP (Labour)	Newport West	Hansard
13 May 2019	Colin Clark MP (Conservative)	Gordon	→	Derek Thomas MP (Conservative)	St Ives	Hansard
15 July 2019	Dr Dan Poulter MP (Conservative)	Central Suffolk and North Ipswich	→	Jeremy Lefroy MP (Conservative)	Stafford	Hansard

== 2015-2017 Parliament ==
The chair was elected on 18 June 2015, with members being announced on 20 July 2015.

Member	Party	Constituency
Huw Irranca-Davies MP (Chair)	Labour and Co-op	Ogmore
Peter Aldous MP	Conservative	Waveney
Caroline Ansell MP	Conservative	Eastbourne
Jo Churchill MP	Conservative	Bury St Edmunds
Zac Goldsmith MP	Conservative	Richmond Park
Margaret Greenwood MP	Labour	Wirral West
Luke Hall MP	Conservative	Thornbury and Yate
Carolyn Harris MP	Labour	Swansea East
Peter Heaton-Jones MP	Conservative	North Devon
Peter Lilley MP	Conservative	Hitchin and Harpenden
Caroline Lucas MP	Green	Brighton Pavilion
Holly Lynch MP	Labour	Halifax
John McNally MP	SNP	Falkirk
Rebecca Pow MP	Conservative	Taunton Deane
Jeff Smith MP	Labour	Manchester Withington
Rory Stewart MP	Conservative	Penrith and The Border

=== Changes 2015-2017 ===
Date	Outgoing Member & Party	Constituency	→	New Member & Party	Constituency	Source
26 October 2015	Holly Lynch MP (Labour)	Halifax	→	Mary Creagh MP (Labour)	Wakefield	Hansard
26 October 2015	Jeff Smith MP (Labour)	Manchester Withington	→	Geraint Davies MP (Labour and Co-op)	Swansea West	Hansard
25 January 2016	Huw Irranca-Davies MP (Chair, Labour)	Ogmore	→	Vacant		Hansard
10 February 2016	Vacant		→	Mary Creagh MP (Chair, Labour)	Wakefield	Hansard
10 February 2016	Mary Creagh MP (Labour)	Ogmore	→	Vacant		Hansard
4 July 2016	Vacant		→	Kerry McCarthy MP (Labour)	Bristol East	Hansard
12 September 2016	Carolyn Harris MP (Labour)	Swansea East	→	Dr Alan Whitehead MP (Labour)	Southampton Test	Hansard
10 October 2016	Rory Stewart MP (Conservative)	Penrith and The Border	→	Dr Thérèse Coffey MP (Conservative)	Suffolk Coastal	Hansard
25 October 2016	Zac Goldsmith MP (Conservative)	Richmond Park	→	Vacant		Resignation of member from Parliament
31 October 2016	Jo Churchill MP (Conservative)	Bury St Edmunds	→	Glyn Davies MP (Conservative)	Montgomeryshire	Hansard
31 October 2016	Rebecca Pow MP (Conservative)	Taunton Deane	→	Matthew Offord MP (Conservative)	Hendon	Hansard
28 November 2016	Dr Alan Whitehead MP (Labour)	Southampton Test	→	Gavin Shuker MP (Labour and Co-op)	Luton South	Hansard
19 December 2016	Vacant		→	Scott Mann MP (Conservative)	North Cornwall	Hansard
19 December 2016	Margaret Greenwood MP (Labour)	Wirral West	→	Joan Ryan MP (Labour)	Enfield North	Hansard

== 2010-2015 Parliament ==
The chair was elected on 10 June 2010, with members being announced on 26 July 2010.

Member	Party	Constituency
Joan Walley MP (Chair)	Labour	Stoke-on-Trent North
Peter Aldous MP	Conservative	Waveney
Richard Benyon MP	Conservative	Newbury
Neil Carmichael MP	Conservative	Stroud
Martin Caton MP	Labour	Gower
Katy Clark MP	Labour	North Ayrshire and Arran
Ian Murray MP	Labour	Edinburgh South
Sheryll Murray MP	Conservative	South East Cornwall
Caroline Nokes MP	Conservative	Romsey and Southampton North
Mark Spencer MP	Conservative	Sherwood
Dr Alan Whitehead MP	Labour	Southampton Test
Simon Wright MP	Liberal Democrats	Norwich South

=== Changes 2010-2015 ===
Date	Outgoing Member & Party	Constituency	→	New Member & Party	Constituency	Source
5 December 2011	Simon Kirby MP (Conservative)	Brighton Kemptown	→	Paul Uppal MP (Conservative)	Wolverhampton South West	Hansard
3 December 2012	Sheryll Murray MP (Conservative)	South East Cornwall	→	Matthew Offord MP (Conservative)	Hendon	Hansard
10 December 2012	Ian Murray MP (Labour)	Edinburgh South	→	Chris Evans MP (Labour and Co-op)	Islwyn	Hansard
11 November 2013	Paul Uppal MP (Conservative)	Wolverhampton South West	→	Vacant		Hansard
25 November 2013	Richard Benyon MP (Conservative)	Newbury	→	Dan Rogerson MP (Liberal Democrats)	North Cornwall	Hansard
16 December 2013	Vacant		→	Caroline Spelman MP (Conservative)	Meriden	Hansard
18 March 2014	Chris Evans MP (Labour Co-op)	Islwyn	→	Mike Kane MP (Labour)	Wythenshawe and Sale East	Hansard

== See also ==
- Parliamentary committees of the United Kingdom
