= Altınlı =

Altınlı can refer to:

- Altınlı, Akçadağ
- Altınlı, Çankırı
- Altınlı, Taşova
