= Enfield North =

UK Parliament constituency (since 1974)

- Borough constituency for the House of Commons
- Interactive map of boundaries from 2024
- Boundary within Greater London
- County: Greater London; 51.667°N 0.075°W
- Electorate: 76,824 (March 2020)

Current constituency
- Created: 1974
- Member of Parliament: Feryal Clark (Labour)
- Seats: One
- Created from: Enfield East (majority) and Enfield West (part)

Enfield North is a peripheral Greater London constituency (Note: A borough constituency (for the purposes of election expenses and type of returning officer)) created in 1974 and represented in the House of Commons of the UK Parliament since 2019 by Feryal Clark of the Labour Party.

== Constituency profile ==
The Enfield North constituency is located on the outskirts of Greater London, forming the northern part of the Borough of Enfield. Neighbourhoods covered by the constituency include Ponders End, Bullsmoor, Gordon Hill, Brimsdown and Enfield town centre. Enfield is a historic market town and the central parts of the town are generally affluent. The residential area to the east in the Lea Valley has an industrial heritage and was the site of the Royal Small Arms Factory. This part of the constituency has high levels of deprivation. House prices in Enfield North are generally higher than the national average but lower than the rest of London.

In general, residents of the constituency are young and have low levels of education. Compared to the rest of London, they are less likely to work in professional occupations and household income is low. The constituency is ethnically diverse; White people made up 52% of residents at the 2021 census with 36% being White British. Black people were the largest ethnic minority group at 20% and Asians were 10%. The Borough of Enfield has the highest proportion of Turkish and Albanian speakers in the country. At the local council, the western, more suburban parts of the constituency are represented by Conservatives whilst the eastern areas elected Labour Party councillors. An estimated 52% of voters in Enfield North supported remaining in the European Union in the 2016 referendum, a higher rate than the rest of the country but lower than the rest of London.

== History ==
The seat was created for the February 1974 election from the former seats of Enfield West and Enfield East. The former was a safe Conservative seat, at one point represented by Iain Macleod, whereas the latter was a secure Labour seat.

From its creation up until 2015, Enfield North was somewhat a bellwether of the national result; it elected Labour MPs at both the 1974 elections, was taken by the Conservatives and held by comfortable margins in every election from 1979 to 1992, before being won back by Labour in 1997 (albeit with relatively narrow majorities throughout the party's time in government) and narrowly going to the Conservatives in 2010 in an election which nationally saw a hung Parliament. In 2015, however, the Conservatives lost the seat to Labour in an election which nationally saw them win an overall majority. Since 2015, it has been retained by Labour with comfortable majorities.

Boundary alterations based on an increased population within the existing area made the seat notionally Conservative before the 6 May 2010 election, and Nick de Bois won the seat. However, the former Labour MP Joan Ryan, who sat for the constituency from 1997 to 2010, regained it in 2015. The 2015 result gave the seat the 13th most marginal majority of Labour's 232 seats by percentage of majority. De Bois and Ryan stood against each other in this seat over five general elections, between 2001 and 2017, with Ryan winning four of those five. Ryan left the Labour Party in 2019 to join Change UK, being replaced by Feryal Clark as the successful Labour Party candidate in the 2019 General Election.

== Boundaries ==
=== Historic ===
1974–1983: The London Borough of Enfield wards of Bullsmoor, Bush Hill, Cambridge Road, Chase, Enfield Wash, Green Street, Ordnance, Ponders End, Town, and Willow.

1983–2010: The London Borough of Enfield wards of Bullsmoor, Chase, Enfield Lock, Enfield Wash, Green Street, Hoe Lane, Ponders End, Southbury, Town, Willow, and Worcesters.

2010–2024: The London Borough of Enfield wards of Chase, Enfield Highway, Enfield Lock, Highlands, Southbury, Town, and Turkey Street.

Part of Highlands ward was transferred to Enfield North from the constituency of Enfield, Southgate. Part of Grange ward was transferred to Enfield, Southgate. Ponders End ward was transferred to Edmonton, and part of Southbury ward was transferred from Edmonton to Enfield North.

=== Current ===
Further to the 2023 review of Westminster constituencies, which came into effect for the 2024 general election, the constituency is composed of:

- The London Borough of Enfield wards of Brimsdown, Bullsmoor, Carterhatch, Enfield Lock, Ponders End, Ridgeway, Southbury, Town, and Whitewebbs.

The new boundaries reflect the local government boundary review for Enfield which came into effect in May 2022. In order to bring the electorate within the permitted electoral range, the Ponders End ward was transferred back from Edmonton.

The constituency is set in the northern third of the London Borough of Enfield, stretching from Enfield Chase in the west, and the King George V Reservoir in the east, incorporating Brimsdown, Enfield Lock, and the M25 motorway interchange at the boundary with the borough of Broxbourne to the north.

== Members of Parliament ==
Election	Member	Party	Notes
Feb 1974	Bryan Davies	Labour	
1979	Tim Eggar	Conservative	
1997	Joan Ryan	Labour	Parliamentary Under-Secretary of State for Nationality, Citizenship and Immigration (2006–2007)
2010	Nick de Bois	Conservative	
2015	Joan Ryan	Labour	
Feb 2019	Joan Ryan	Change UK	
Dec 2019	Feryal Clark	Labour	Parliamentary Under-Secretary of State for AI and Digital Government (2024–2025)

== Election results ==
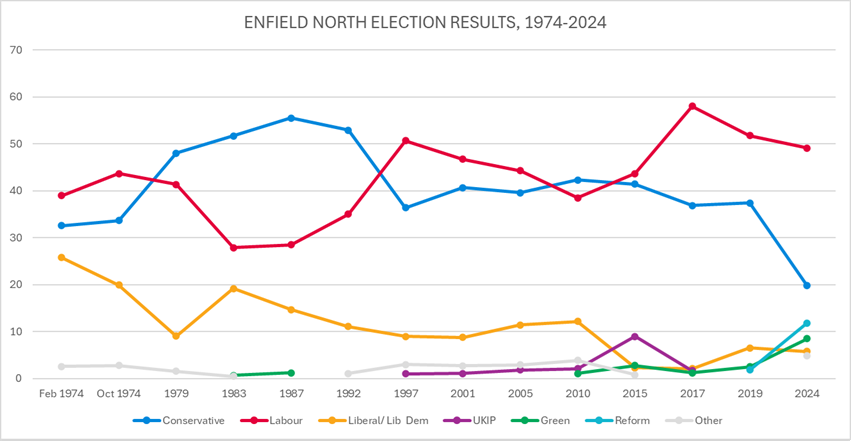
Election results 1974-2024

=== Elections in the 2020s ===
General election 2024: Enfield North
Party	Candidate	Votes	%	±%
Labour	Feryal Clark	21,368	49.1	–4.2
Conservative	Chris Dey	8,632	19.8	–16.1
Reform	Stephen Bird	5,146	11.8	+10.0
Green	Isobel Whittaker	3,713	8.5	+6.1
Liberal Democrats	Guy Russo	2,517	5.8	–0.7
Independent	Ertan Karpazli	1,448	3.3	N/A
Workers Party	Aishat Anifowoshe	668	1.5	N/A
Majority		12,736	29.3	+11.9
Turnout		43,492	55.2	–10.9
Registered electors		78,770		
Labour hold		Swing	▲5.9	

=== Elections in the 2010s ===
2019 notional result
Party	Vote	%
Labour	27,103	53.3
Conservative	18,250	35.9
Liberal Democrats	3,319	6.5
Green	1,228	2.4
Brexit Party	908	1.8
Turnout	50,808	66.1
Electorate	76,824	

General election 2019: Enfield North
Party	Candidate	Votes	%	±%
Labour	Feryal Clark	23,340	51.8	–6.2
Conservative	Joanne Laban	16,848	37.4	+0.5
Liberal Democrats	Guy Russo	2,950	6.5	+4.4
Green	Isobel Whittaker	1,115	2.5	+1.3
Brexit Party	Ike Ijeh	797	1.8	N/A
Majority		6,492	14.4	–6.7
Turnout		45,050	66.2	–5.1
Registered electors		68,066		
Labour hold		Swing	–3.3	

General election 2017: Enfield North
Party	Candidate	Votes	%	±%
Labour	Joan Ryan	28,177	58.0	+14.3
Conservative	Nick de Bois	17,930	36.9	–4.4
Liberal Democrats	Nicholas da Costa	1,036	2.1	–0.2
UKIP	Deborah Cairns	848	1.7	–7.2
Green	Bill Linton	574	1.2	–1.6
Majority		10,247	21.1	+18.7
Turnout		48,565	71.3	+3.6
Registered electors		68,076		
Labour hold		Swing	+9.4	

General election 2015: Enfield North
Party	Candidate	Votes	%	±%
Labour	Joan Ryan	20,172	43.7	+5.2
Conservative	Nick de Bois	19,086	41.4	−0.9
UKIP	Deborah Cairns	4,133	9.0	+6.8
Green	David Flint	1,303	2.8	+1.7
Liberal Democrats	Cara Jenkinson	1,059	2.3	−9.9
CPA	Yemi Awolola	207	0.4	+0.1
TUSC	Joe Simpson	177	0.4	N/A
Majority		1,086	2.4	N/A
Turnout		46,137	67.7	+0.6
Registered electors		68,118		
Labour gain from Conservative		Swing	+3.1	

General election 2010: Enfield North
Party	Candidate	Votes	%	±%
Conservative	Nick de Bois	18,804	42.3	–0.8
Labour	Joan Ryan	17,112	38.5	–2.3
Liberal Democrats	Paul Smith	5,403	12.2	+0.7
BNP	Tony Avery	1,228	2.8	+0.2
UKIP	Madge Jones	938	2.1	+0.3
Green	Bill Linton	489	1.1	N/A
Christian	Anthony Williams	161	0.4	N/A
English Democrat	Raquel Weald	131	0.3	N/A
Workers Revolutionary	Anna Athow	96	0.2	N/A
Independent	Gonul Daniels	91	0.2	N/A
Majority		1,692	3.8	+3.1
Turnout		44,453	67.1	+6.8
Registered electors		66,261		+0.4
Conservative hold		Swing	+0.7 (Note: Boundary changes before the 2010 election meant that this seat was notionally Conservative, and hence de Bois's win was a Conservative hold rather than a gain.)	

=== Elections in the 2000s ===
2005 notional result
Party	Vote	%
Conservative	17,167	43.1
Labour	16,230	40.8
Liberal Democrats	4,548	11.4
BNP	1,004	2.5
UKIP	711	1.8
Others	163	0.4
Turnout	39,823	60.3
Electorate	66,014	

General election 2005: Enfield North
Party	Candidate	Votes	%	±%
Labour	Joan Ryan	18,055	44.3	–2.4
Conservative	Nick de Bois	16,135	39.6	–1.1
Liberal Democrats	Simon Radford	4,642	11.4	+2.6
BNP	Terence Farr	1,004	2.5	+0.9
UKIP	Gary Robbens	750	1.8	+0.7
Independent	Patrick Burns	163	0.4	N/A
Majority		1,920	4.7	–1.3
Turnout		40,749	64.0	+6.9
Registered electors		63,720		
Labour hold		Swing	–0.6	

General election 2001: Enfield North
Party	Candidate	Votes	%	±%
Labour	Joan Ryan	17,888	46.7	–4.0
Conservative	Nick de Bois	15,597	40.7	+4.3
Liberal Democrats	Hilary Leighter	3,355	8.8	–0.2
BNP	Ray Johns	605	1.6	+0.3
UKIP	Brian Hall	427	1.1	+0.1
ProLife Alliance	Michael Akerman	241	0.6	N/A
Independent	Richard Course	210	0.5	N/A
Majority		2,291	6.0	–8.3
Turnout		38,323	57.0	−13.3
Registered electors		67,204		
Labour hold		Swing	–4.2	

=== Elections in the 1990s ===
General election 1997: Enfield North
Party	Candidate	Votes	%	±%
Labour	Joan Ryan	24,138	50.7	+15.7
Conservative	Mark Field	17,326	36.4	–16.5
Liberal Democrats	Mike Hopkins	4,264	9.0	–2.1
Referendum	Robert Ellingham	857	1.8	N/A
BNP	Jean Griffin	590	1.2	N/A
UKIP	Jose O'Ware	484	1.0	N/A
Majority		6,812	14.3	N/A
Turnout		47,659	70.4	–7.5
Registered electors		67,748		
Labour gain from Conservative		Swing	+16.1	

General election 1992: Enfield North
Party	Candidate	Votes	%	±%
Conservative	Tim Eggar	27,789	52.9	–2.6
Labour	Martin Upham	18,359	34.9	+6.5
Liberal Democrats	Sarah Tustin	5,817	11.1	–3.7
Natural Law	John Markham	565	1.1	N/A
Majority		9,430	18.0	–9.1
Turnout		52,530	77.9	+3.4
Registered electors		67,421		
Conservative hold		Swing	–4.6	

=== Elections in the 1980s ===
General election 1987: Enfield North
Party	Candidate	Votes	%	±%
Conservative	Tim Eggar	28,758	55.5	+3.8
Labour	Martin Upham	14,743	28.5	+0.6
Alliance	Hilary Leighter	7,633	14.7	−4.5
Green	Eric Chantler	644	1.2	+0.6
Majority		14,015	27.1	+3.3
Turnout		51,778	74.5	+2.1
Registered electors		69,488		
Conservative hold		Swing	+1.6	

General election 1983: Enfield North
Party	Candidate	Votes	%	±%
Conservative	Tim Eggar	25,456	51.7	+3.1
Labour	Brian Grayson	13,740	27.9	–12.8
Alliance	James Daly	9,452	19.2	+10.0
Ecology	T Persighetti	320	0.6	N/A
BNP	J Billingham	268	0.5	N/A
Majority		11,716	23.8	+15.9
Turnout		49,236	72.4	–5.6
Registered electors		67,980		
Conservative hold		Swing	+7.9	

=== Elections in the 1970s ===
1979 notional result
Party	Vote	%
Conservative	25,078	48.6
Labour	20,999	40.7
Liberal	4,756	9.2
Others	816	1.6
Turnout	51,649	
Electorate		

General election 1979: Enfield North
Party	Candidate	Votes	%	±%
Conservative	Tim Eggar	24,927	48.1	+14.4
Labour	Bryan Davies	21,444	41.3	−2.3
Liberal	Keith Crawford	4,681	9.0	−10.9
National Front	Jeremy Wotherspoon	816	1.6	−1.2
Majority		3,483	6.7	N/A
Turnout		51,866	78.1	+7.6
Registered electors		66,427		
Conservative gain from Labour		Swing	+8.4	

General election October 1974: Enfield North
Party	Candidate	Votes	%	±%
Labour	Bryan Davies	20,880	43.7	+4.6
Conservative	Christopher de H Parkinson	16,087	33.6	+1.1
Liberal	Sarah Curtis	9,526	19.9	–5.9
National Front	R Burton	1,330	2.8	+0.2
Majority		4,793	10.0	+3.6
Turnout		47,825	70.5	−8.3
Registered electors		67,818		
Labour hold		Swing	+1.8	

General election February 1974: Enfield North
Party	Candidate	Votes	%	±%
Labour	Bryan Davies	20,690	39.0	–6.4
Conservative	Christopher de H Parkinson	17,274	32.6	–10.7
Liberal	Sarah Curtis	13,682	25.8	+14.6
National Front	K.T. Robinson	1,372	2.6	N/A
Majority		3,416	6.4	+4.3
Turnout		53,015	78.8	+11.4
Registered electors		67,304		
Labour hold		Swing	+2.1	

1970 notional result
Party	Vote	%
Labour	21,100	45.5
Conservative	20,100	43.3
Liberal	5,200	11.2
Turnout	46,400	67.3
Electorate	68,909	

== See also ==
- List of parliamentary constituencies in London
