= Dutlu, Akçadağ =

Village in Turkey

Dutlu
- Neighbourhood
- Location in Turkey
- Coordinates: 38.316°N 37.746°E
- Country: Turkey
- Province: Malatya
- District: Akçadağ
- Population (2025): 67
- Time zone: UTC+3 (TRT)

Dutlu is a neighbourhood in the municipality and district of Akçadağ, Malatya Province in Turkey. It is populated by Kurds of the Kurecik tribe and had a population of 67 in 2025.
