= Hançerli, Akçadağ =

Village in Turkey

Hançerli
- Neighbourhood
- Location in Turkey
- Coordinates: 38.312°N 37.873°E
- Country: Turkey
- Province: Malatya
- District: Akçadağ
- Population (2025): 93
- Time zone: UTC+3 (TRT)

Hançerli is a neighbourhood in the municipality and district of Akçadağ, Malatya Province in Turkey. It is populated by Kurds of the Kurecik tribe and had a population of 93 in 2025.
