= Aksüt, Akçadağ =

Village in Turkey

Aksüt
- Neighbourhood
- Location in Turkey
- Coordinates: 38.405°N 37.772°E
- Country: Turkey
- Province: Malatya
- District: Akçadağ
- Population (2025): 73
- Time zone: UTC+3 (TRT)

Aksüt (Kurdish: Tapkin) is a neighbourhood in the municipality and district of Akçadağ, Malatya Province in Turkey. It is populated by Kurds of the Kurecik tribe and had a population of 73 in 2025.
