= Nick de Bois =

British Conservative Party politician

Nick de Bois CBE
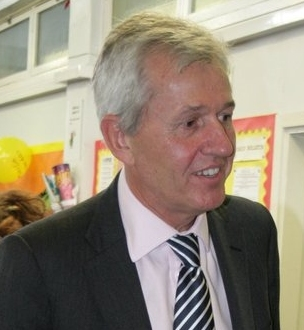

Special adviser and chief of staff to the Secretary of State for Exiting the European Union
- In office 9 July 2018 – 15 November 2018
- Sec. of State: Dominic Raab
- Preceded by: Stewart Jackson

Member of Parliament for Enfield North
- In office 6 May 2010 – 30 March 2015
- Preceded by: Joan Ryan
- Succeeded by: Joan Ryan

Personal details
- Born: Geoffrey Nicholas de Bois; 23 February 1959 (age 67) Ely, Cambridgeshire, England
- Party: Conservative
- Spouse: Helen Seaman (m. 2009)
- Children: 4

Geoffrey Nicholas de Bois CBE (born 23 February 1959) is a British broadcaster and former Conservative Party politician, who served as special adviser and chief of staff to Dominic Raab during his brief tenure as Secretary of State for Exiting the European Union. He was elected at the 2010 general election as the Member of Parliament for Enfield North, defeating the Labour incumbent MP Joan Ryan. de Bois then went on to lose the seat to Ryan at the next general election, in May 2015.

== Early life ==
Educated was born at RAF Hospital Ely in Ely, He studied at the private Culford School, de Bois has a Higher National Diploma (HND) in business studies from Cambridge College of Arts and Technology and is a fan of Liverpool Football Club. He was managing director of Rapiergroup, a marketing communications company, where he began work in the mid-1980s, after a brief spell in Public Relations with the Advertising Standards Authority.

== Parliamentary career ==
De Bois had contested the Enfield North constituency in the 2001 and the 2005 general elections, taking second place to Joan Ryan on both occasions. He also stood unsuccessfully for Stalybridge and Hyde in 1997.

Following his election as the MP for Enfield North in 2010, with a majority of 1,692, de Bois served on the Public Administration Committee from 2010 to 2011, and the Justice Committee from 2011 onwards. In 2012 he was elected by his fellow Conservative MPs as Secretary of the 1922 Committee of backbenchers, which regularly meets with senior party figures advising them on the views of Conservative MPs.

=== Knife crime ===
Following a significant increase in knife crime in his constituency, de Bois championed an amendment to the Legal Aid, Sentencing and Punishment of Offenders Act 2012 then going through Parliament, to extend the proposed mandatory prison sentences for those who use a knife to threaten or endanger life, to include people aged under 18.

In his campaign, de Bois wrote to the Prime Minister David Cameron and the Attorney General Dominic Grieve, seeking their support. and teamed up with a local newspaper, the Enfield Independent, to collected signatures for a petition supporting the amendment, to be presented to Parliament. The amendment ultimately passed after winning the support of a large number of both Labour and Conservative MPs.

In 2015 the second part of this so-called 'Enfield's Law' came into force, meaning adults caught carrying a knife for the second time in public would face an automatic jail sentence of six months, and 16- and 17-year-olds four months.

=== 2011 riots in Enfield ===
On Sunday 7 August 2011, a number of violent disturbances erupted in the centre of de Bois' constituency, which culminated in looting and arson at the large Sony Distribution Centre in Solar Way, Enfield Lock. De Bois discussed personally witnessing the violence in Enfield in a House of Commons speech.

De Bois paid tribute to the actions of the local police force in Enfield but called for a rethink of police tactics to allow the use of water cannons, and suggested that schools should help to identify the rioters based on video footage. He publicly supported the Prime Minister's statement that if the police required them, they could have water cannons at 24 hours' notice.

Following a report from Oxford University released four years after the riots, de Bois criticised the findings and reiterated his view that the rioters he encountered showed a lack of respect for his constituents, for property and for the police.

== Local activity ==
=== Chase Farm Hospital ===
De Bois led the Hands Off Our Hospital campaign against changes to services at Chase Farm Hospital, Enfield, since 2004. Under the Barnet, Enfield and Haringey (BEH) Clinical Strategy, Chase Farm was set to have its services "reconfigured", with its 24-hour A&E department replaced with a 12-hour Urgent Care Centre and its consultant-led maternity unit replaced with a midwife-led unit.

The issue of cuts to Chase Farm was a key local issue in Enfield North constituency at the 2010 general election. Following the election in May, Health Secretary Andrew Lansley visited Chase Farm to call a halt to all hospital reconfiguration plans, saying they could only proceed if the plans passed the four tests he had set down. Since this announcement, NHS London and NHS Enfield have stated, following a review, that they believe the four tests have been met. De Bois said this was an attempt to "bully residents into accepting the changes".

De Bois stated in the House of Commons that he believes the cuts to Chase Farm "will cost lives", which drew criticism from a Haringey GP who supports the changes.

Nick de Bois led a deputation to the Health Secretary on 7 March 2011, along with Enfield's two other MPs David Burrowes and Andy Love, and the leader of Enfield council and other councillors. He raised the issue of Chase Farm directly with David Cameron at Prime Minister's Questions. Despite these campaigns the Government announced in late 2011 that the hospital would lose many of its key services.

On his website, de Bois still argues that Chase Farm should have a 24-hour A&E unit and consultant-led maternity services. Following a campaign with neighbouring MP David Burrowes, de Bois welcomed the announcement of new extended hours at Chase Farm's care centre and pledged to continue supporting better out of hours access to urgent care.

On 12 March 2015 de Bois welcomed the unanimous decision to demolish the crumbling buildings on the site and replace it with a new hospital, a new primary school and a new housing development, as suggested by Royal Free London NHS Foundation Trust who run Chase Farm. De Bois said the plans would improve local healthcare and disproved claims by his political opponents that Chase Farm was set to close.

=== Enfield Jobs Fair ===
In 2011 de Bois organised a jobs fair for Enfield to help combat unemployment in his constituency, which stood at an above average 6.6%. According to de Bois the expected attendance was between 150 and 300 people, but more than 1,200 attended. He promised that the jobs fair would not be a one-off, but that regular work clubs would be set up as a consequence and another mass event planned within a year.

The following year Mayor of London Boris Johnson opened the Jobs Fair, with de Bois reporting that over 1,600 jobseekers and more than 40 employers were in attendance.

In October 2014 the Enfield Over 50s Jobs Forum was launched by de Bois to help older people in his constituency back into work. He promised his next Jobs Fair would feature a special centre for over 50s offering advice from experts on job hunting, CV preparation and other employment assistance.

The MP then held his fourth jobs fair on 26 February 2015, stating he was very proud to have established a regular and successful jobs fair which had seen a reduction in youth unemployment by nearly 50 per cent and overall unemployment down by 42 per cent in his constituency. De Bois won praise for his efforts from colleagues in Parliament.

== Expenses ==
Before the 2010 general election, de Bois promised to publish his expenses as an MP on his website every month if he were elected. They were placed on his website accordingly.

== Books by Nick de Bois: Confessions of a Recovering MP (2018) & Fatal Ambition, a thriller ( 2021) ==
In January 2018, de Bois' first book, Confessions of a Recovering MP, was published by Biteback Publishing.

== Broadcasting ==
In 2019, de Bois began working as a stand-in presenter on talkRADIO, a role which he continued throughout 2020. From 2021-May 2022 he was a full-time weekend presenter.

De Bois was appointed Commander of the Order of the British Empire (CBE) in the 2022 Birthday Honours for services to tourism and the economy as chair of the VisitEngland Advisory Board.

Parliament of the United Kingdom
Preceded by Joan Ryan	Member of Parliament for Enfield North; 2010–2015	Succeeded by Joan Ryan
