= Kürecik Radar Station =

Military installation in southeastern Turkey, since 1968

- Kürecik; Near Akçadağ in Turkey

Site information
- Type: Radar station
- Owner: U.S. Army
- Operator: U.S. Army Europe
- Controlled by: NATO Integrated Air Defense System (European Phased Adaptive Approach, EPAA & Combined Air Operations Centre, CAOC)
- Open to the public: No

Location
- Location of Kürecik Radar Station in Turkey.
- Coordinates: 38°20′58″N 37°47′37″E

Site history
- Built: February 2012; 14 years ago

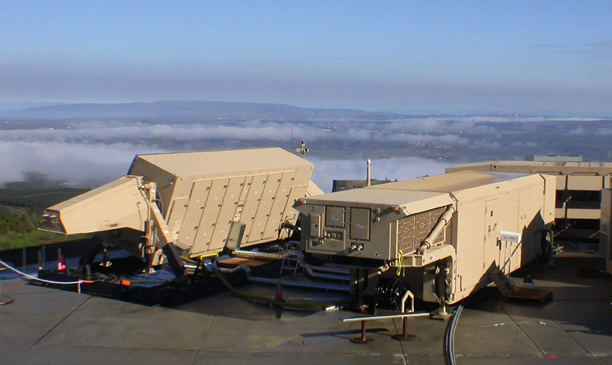
AN/TPY-2 radar (left) installed in Japan, similar to the one in Kürecik

Kürecik Radar Station (Turkish: Kürecik Radar Üssü) is a military installation located in the town of Kürecik in Malatya Province, southeastern Turkey. It was established in 2012 for use by NATO as an early-warning radar against ballistic missile attacks.

== Background ==
At the NATO Lisbon summit in November 2010, a strategic plan was concluded to establish a ballistic missile defense system covering all alliance members. As a NATO member state, the government of Turkey approved the installation of an early-warning radar system on its territory, but insisted on a condition that all the information gathered at the radar station would be strictly for use by the NATO member states. After signing an agreement on final conditions in September 2011, officials from Turkey and the U.S. determined a site near the town of Kürecik in the Akçadağ district of Malatya Province as feasible. In the 1960s, the site hosted a radar base for surveillance of the Soviet Union airspace. In the 1970s and early 1980s it was staffed by a small US Air Force contingent and used as a communications relay site connecting Incirlik CDI with Diyarbakir and Erhaç air bases. Site security was provided by the Turkish military during those years as well. Kürecik is located 59 km (37 mi) west of Malatya. The radar station is situated on the hill of Çat Tepe at an elevation of 2,085 m (6,841 ft).

== Controversy ==
The residents of Kürecik and many others from the region expressed their opposition and mounted protests right after the announcement of the radar site. In September 2011, Iran criticized Turkey for the establishment of the early-warning radar in southeastern Turkey, fearing it would serve to protect Israel from Iranian missile attacks in case of a war.

On October 17, 2023, it is reported that civilians headed in mass to the Kürecik Radar Station to protest an alleged Israeli bombing of Al-Ahli Arab Hospital in Gaza City. Both Israel and the Palestinian Islamic Jihad deny responsibility for the explosion.

== Installation and operation ==
The installation of the radar system was carried out by U.S. military personnel. The establishment of the radar station was completed in February 2012. The radar station's control was transferred to NATO command in the frame of the European Phased Adaptive Approach (EPAA).

The installed radar is an Army Navy/Transportable Radar Surveillance (AN/TPY-2), a Forward-Based X-Band Transportable (FBX-T) surveillance radar developed by Raytheon Integrated Defense Systems, featuring long-range, very high-altitude active electronically scanned array. The radar site's command center is at Diyarbakır Air Base east of Kürecik.

The Kürecik radar station's mission is to relay tracking and discrimination data to a remote missile defense system, the Terminal High Altitude Area Defense (THAAD), stationed in Romania and Poland. Radar range data varies widely as the AN/TPY-2 is used both in forward-based and terminal-based modes. The Kürecik radar as a forward-based radar is deployed in a reasonable proximity to the assumed missile launch site. Kürecik's distance to the Iran-Turkey border is about 700 km (430 mi). About 50 U.S. soldiers were deployed to the radar station for protection and internal security. The Turkish government did not allow foreign civilian technicians at the site for intelligence concerns. Turkey took the responsibility for the external protection of the radar site, which is situated in an isolated region, against sabotage attacks. A team of the Engineer Research and Development Center's (ERDC) Cold Regions Research and Engineering Laboratory (CRREL) from the U.S. Army Corps of Engineers provided technical solutions for the military personnel stationed at the high-elevation Kürecik radar site, where harsh weather conditions occur in winter time.

The early-warning radar is owned by the U.S. Army, and operated by the U.S. Army Europe (11th Missile Defense Battery, 52nd Air Defense Artillery Brigade, 10th Army Air and Missile Defense Command).

== See also ==
- Pirinçlik Air Base, a former radar base in southeastern Turkey.
- Kisecik Radar Station in Hatay Province, southern Turkey
