= Esenbey, Akçadağ =

Village in Turkey

Esenbey
- Neighbourhood
- Location in Turkey
- Coordinates: 38.480°N 37.766°E
- Country: Turkey
- Province: Malatya
- District: Akçadağ
- Population (2025): 389
- Time zone: UTC+3 (TRT)

Esenbey is a neighbourhood in the municipality and district of Akçadağ, Malatya Province in Turkey. It is populated by Kurds and had a population of 389 in 2025.
