= Kömekavak, Akçadağ =

Village in Turkey

Kömekavak
- Neighbourhood
- Location in Turkey
- Coordinates: 38.258°N 37.997°E
- Country: Turkey
- Province: Malatya
- District: Akçadağ
- Population (2025): 179
- Time zone: UTC+3 (TRT)

Kömekavak is a neighbourhood in the municipality and district of Akçadağ, Malatya Province in Turkey. It is populated by Kurds of the Balan tribe and had a population of 179 in 2025.
