= Ortaköy, Akçadağ =

Village in Turkey

Ortaköy
- Neighbourhood
- Location in Turkey
- Coordinates: 38.319°N 37.801°E
- Country: Turkey
- Province: Malatya
- District: Akçadağ
- Population (2025): 121
- Time zone: UTC+3 (TRT)

Ortaköy is a neighbourhood in the municipality and district of Akçadağ, Malatya Province in Turkey. It is populated by Kurds of the Kurecik tribe and had a population of 121 in 2025.
