= Karapınar, Akçadağ =

Village in Turkey

Karapınar
- Neighbourhood
- Location in Turkey
- Coordinates: 38.289°N 38.055°E
- Country: Turkey
- Province: Malatya
- District: Akçadağ
- Population (2025): 451
- Time zone: UTC+3 (TRT)

Karapınar is a neighbourhood in the municipality and district of Akçadağ, Malatya Province in Turkey. It is populated by Kurds of the Balan tribe and had a population of 451 in 2025.
