= Oakwood, London =

Suburban area of north London in England

Coordinates: 51.6433°N 0.1274°W

Oakwood
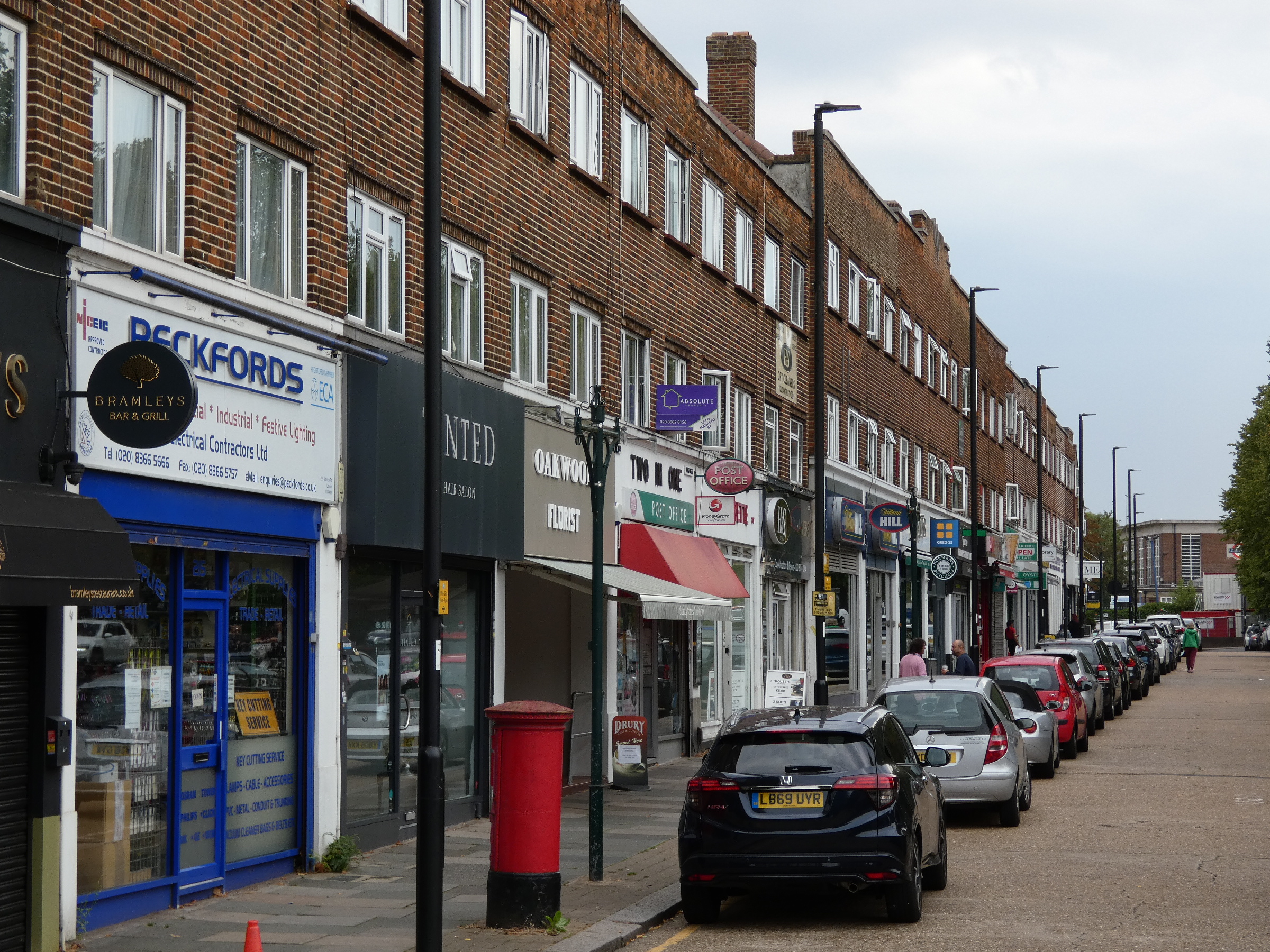
- Bramley Road, Oakwood's main shopping parade

- Location within Greater London
- OS grid reference: TQ295955
- London borough: Enfield
- Ceremonial county: Greater London
- Region: London
- Country: England
- Sovereign state: United Kingdom
- Post town: LONDON
- Postcode district: N14
- Dialling code: 020
- Police: Metropolitan
- Fire: London
- Ambulance: London
- UK Parliament: Southgate and Wood Green
- London Assembly: Enfield and Haringey

Oakwood is a suburban area of north London, in the London Borough of Enfield. It is situated within the Southgate postal area (London N14) and was, historically, the southernmost area of Enfield Chase.

== Local history ==
The area derives its name from Oakwood Park, which Southgate Council purchased in 1927 and opened to the public. Oakwood Park was named after Oak Lodge, which stood in the grounds between the late 19th century and First World War.

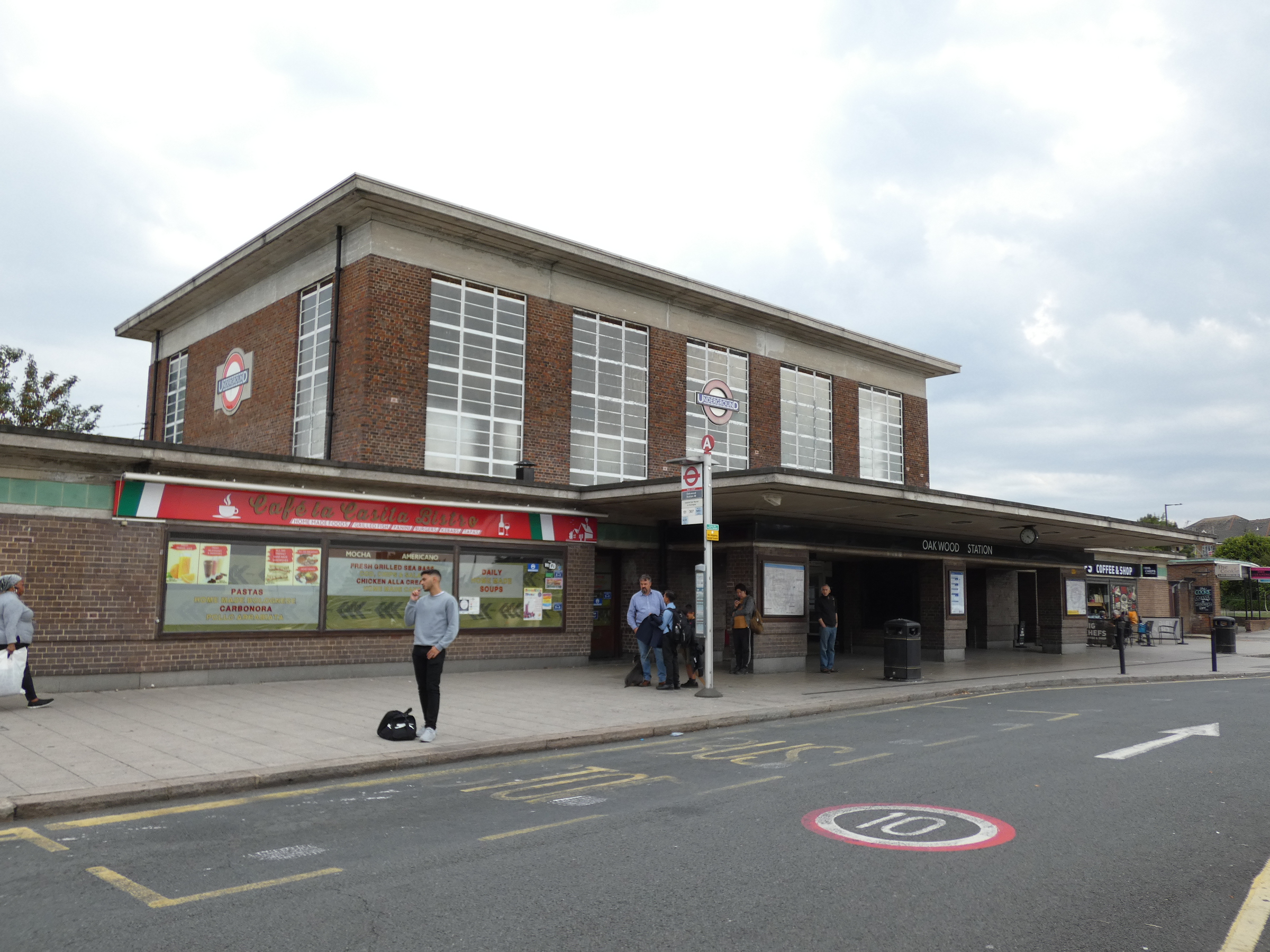
Oakwood Station on the Piccadilly Line

The arrival in Oakwood of the Piccadilly line extension of the London Underground in 1933 resulted in the construction of the grade II* listed Oakwood tube station and heralded the start of a building boom. Builders George Reed and Laing bought up much of the land for development and estates began to eat up the countryside along Bramley Road and towards Cockfosters.

Prior to development, the only major building in the area was South Lodge – one of the four lodges of Enfield Chase. South Lodge was demolished in 1935; West Lodge Park, East Lodge Nursery, and North Lodge Farm are the locations of the other three lodges. South Lodge Drive and South Lodge Crescent are reminders of South Lodge. Boxer's Lake Open Space is one remnant of the Chase.

== Politics ==
Oakwood is part of the Oakwood ward for elections to Enfield London Borough Council.
