= Darıca, Akçadağ =

Village in Turkey

Darıca
- Neighbourhood
- Location in Turkey
- Coordinates: 38.342°N 37.670°E
- Country: Turkey
- Province: Malatya
- District: Akçadağ
- Population (2025): 272
- Time zone: UTC+3 (TRT)

Darıca (Kurdish: Daricê) is a neighbourhood in the municipality and district of Akçadağ, Malatya Province in Turkey. It is populated by Kurds of the Kurecik tribe and had a population of 272 in 2025.
