= Kisecik Radar Station =

Military Base

- Kisecik; Near Antakya in Turkey

Site information
- Type: Radar station
- Operator: NATO
- Controlled by: NATO Integrated Air Defense System (European Phased Adaptive Approach, EPAA & Combined Air Operations Centre, CAOC)
- Open to the public: No

Location
- Location of Kisecik Radar Station in Turkey.
- Coordinates: 36.30379°N 36.00402°E

Site history
- Built: 2004; 22 years ago

Kisecik Radar Station (Turkish: Kisecik Radar Üssü) is a military installation located at Kisecik village of Antakya district in Hatay Province, southern Turkey.

Construction of the facility for use by NATO started in 1998. It went into service in the summer of 2004. It is situated on a 1,770 m (5,810 ft)-high hilltop of the Nur Mountains close to the Syria–Turkey border. The radar station can cover an area including Middle Eastern countries, Syria and Israel. The radar base has installations in underground and aboveground, and is protected by fences. The next radar base in Hatay Province is the Atik Plateau Radar Station at Belen, Hatay.

== See also ==
- Kürecik Radar Station in Malatya Province, eastern Turkey
