= Sahilköy, Akçadağ =

Village in Turkey

Sahilköy
- Neighbourhood
- Location in Turkey
- Coordinates: 38.276°N 38.018°E
- Country: Turkey
- Province: Malatya
- District: Akçadağ
- Population (2025): 139
- Time zone: UTC+3 (TRT)

Sahilköy (Kurdish: Sincik) is a neighbourhood in the municipality and district of Akçadağ, Malatya Province in Turkey. It is populated by Kurds of the Balan tribe and had a population of 139 in 2025.
