= Ören, Akçadağ =

Village in Turkey

Ören
- Neighbourhood
- Location in Turkey
- Coordinates: 38.252°N 37.928°E
- Country: Turkey
- Province: Malatya
- District: Akçadağ
- Population (2025): 1,534
- Time zone: UTC+3 (TRT)

Ören is a neighbourhood in the municipality and district of Akçadağ, Malatya Province in Turkey. It is populated by Kurds and Turks and had a population of 1,534 in 2025.
