= Aşağıörükçü, Akçadağ =

Village in Turkey

Aşağıörükçü
- Neighbourhood
- Location in Turkey
- Coordinates: 38.440°N 38.052°E
- Country: Turkey
- Province: Malatya
- District: Akçadağ
- Population (2025): 452
- Time zone: UTC+3 (TRT)

Aşağıörükçü is a neighbourhood in the municipality and district of Akçadağ, Malatya Province in Turkey. It is populated by Turks and had a population of 452 in 2025.
