= Yukarıörükçü, Akçadağ =

Village in Turkey

Yukarıörükçü
- Neighbourhood
- Location in Turkey
- Coordinates: 38.450°N 38.033°E
- Country: Turkey
- Province: Malatya
- District: Akçadağ
- Population (2025): 367
- Time zone: UTC+3 (TRT)

Yukarıörükçü is a neighbourhood in the municipality and district of Akçadağ, Malatya Province in Turkey. It is populated by Turks and had a population of 367 in 2025.
