= İkinciler, Akçadağ =

Village in Turkey

İkinciler
- Neighbourhood
- Location in Turkey
- Coordinates: 38.297°N 37.939°E
- Country: Turkey
- Province: Malatya
- District: Akçadağ
- Population (2025): 593
- Time zone: UTC+3 (TRT)

İkinciler (Kurdish: Garan) is a neighbourhood in the municipality and district of Akçadağ, Malatya Province in Turkey. It is populated by Kurds of the Balan tribe and had a population of 593 in 2025.
