= Bölüklü, Akçadağ =

Village in Turkey

Bölüklü
- Neighbourhood
- Location in Turkey
- Coordinates: 38.264°N 37.917°E
- Country: Turkey
- Province: Malatya
- District: Akçadağ
- Population (2025): 436
- Time zone: UTC+3 (TRT)

Bölüklü is a neighbourhood in the municipality and district of Akçadağ, Malatya Province in Turkey. It is populated by Kurds and had a population of 436 in 2025.
