= Tim Eggar =

British businessman and politician

The Right Honourable Tim Eggar CBE

Member of Parliament for Enfield North
- In office 3 May 1979 – 8 April 1997
- Preceded by: Bryan Davies
- Succeeded by: Joan Ryan

Personal details
- Born: Timothy John Crommelin Eggar; 19 December 1951 (age 74)
- Party: Conservative

Timothy John Crommelin Eggar (born 19 December 1951) is a British businessman and former politician. He holds positions on the boards of multiple organisations including Shiplake College and Cape plc, and was the Conservative MP for Enfield North between 1979 and 1997.

== Personal life ==
Timothy Eggar is the son of John Eggar and Pamela Crommelin-Brown. He was educated at Abberley Hall School and Winchester College. He has degrees from Magdalene College, Cambridge, and The College of Law. He has two children with his wife, Charmian Minoprio, whom he married in 1977.

== Politics ==
Eggar was elected to the Commons in 1979, aged 27, by winning the previously-Labour seat of Enfield North. As a backbencher he served on the Treasury and Civil Service Committee and took a special interest in energy, economic, financial and civil service issues. He was an early advocate of privatization. From 1981 he served as Parliamentary Private Secretary at the Overseas Development Administration before being appointed as the Parliamentary Under-Secretary of State for Foreign Affairs in 1985.

Eggar was Minister for Employment from 1989 to 1990, and in that capacity he was Minister for Small Business. He took the 1990 Employment Act through Parliament which effectively made pre-entry closed shops and secondary action unlawful.

In 1989, a judge said Eggar had acted "stupidly, idiotically and provocatively". Eggar had witnessed a six-year-old girl taking flowers from his front garden, and had taken the girl inside his home in order to reprimand her. The girl's father later assaulted Eggar, for which the man received a suspended prison sentence. Eggar was not asked to give evidence and did not comment on the judge's remarks.

In July 1990, Eggar was appointed to the Department of Education and Science. He was responsible for the Further and Higher Education Act which established the Further Education Funding Council and removed Further Education and sixth form colleges from Local Education Authority control. He also introduced GNVQs and the Technology Schools initiative in 1991.

After the 1992 election, Eggar was appointed as Minister for Energy at the Department of Trade and Industry. Responsibility for Industry was added in 1994. Among other issues he had responsibility for the Government's sale of British Coal and the non-magnox nuclear power stations. He introduced the Gas Act which led to the restructuring of British Gas and the introduction of household gas supply competition.

In January 1996, Eggar announced he would not contest the next election as he wanted to pursue a business career. He stood down as a minister in July 1996. Labour won his Enfield North seat from the Conservatives in their election victory the following year.

In March 2019, Eggar was announced as the new Chairman of the Oil and Gas Authority (OGA). As Chairman of the OGA he will decide on the future development of the 800 million barrel oil equivalent Cambo oil field. Ref D/4261/2021. His decision can be agreed or vetoed by the Head of the Offshore Petroleum Regulator for Environment and Decommissioning (OPRED), currently Wendy Kennedy O.B.E., who holds power devolved from the Secretary of State for Business, Energy and Investment Strategy (BEIS). Eggar says he is committed to reducing greenhouse gas emissions. In September 2021, despite being the head of the regulatory body for the industry, it was revealed that he owns £57,600 worth of shares in the oil services company MyCelx, and his wife also has shares in BP and Shell.

== Business ==
After leaving Cambridge in 1973, Eggar qualified as a barrister before becoming an investment banker specialising in natural resource financing.

After leaving Parliament Eggar became chairman of Agip UK and M. W. Kellogg Limited. In 1998, he was appointed as CEO Of Monument Oil and Gas until its acquisition by Lasmo. From 2000 to 2005 he was vice-chairman of ABN AMRO. From 2004 he held a number of non-executive roles including chairman of Harrison Lovegrove & Co, Indago Petroleum, and 3legs Resources, as well as being a non-executive director of Expro, Anglo Asian Mining.

He was president of the Russo-British Chamber of Commerce from 2004 to 2012. He is chairman of governors at Shiplake College, chairman of Cape plc, chairman of Mycelx Technologies Corp, chairman of Haulfryn Group, and is also an advisory board member of Braemar Energy Ventures

== Sources ==
- Wood, Alan H., ed. (11 June 1992). The Times Guide to the House of Commons (April 1992 ed.). ISBN 0723004978.
- Austin, Tim, ed. (5 May 1998). The Times Guide to the House of Commons (May 1997 ed.). ISBN 0723009562.

Parliament of the United Kingdom
Preceded by Bryan Davies	Member of Parliament for Enfield North; 1979–1997	Succeeded by Joan Ryan
