= Keller, Akçadağ =

Village in Turkey

Keller
- Neighbourhood
- Location in Turkey
- Coordinates: 38.319°N 37.903°E
- Country: Turkey
- Province: Malatya
- District: Akçadağ
- Population (2025): 96
- Time zone: UTC+3 (TRT)

Keller is a neighbourhood in the municipality and district of Akçadağ, Malatya Province in Turkey. It is populated by Kurds of the Kurecik tribe and had a population of 96 in 2025.
