= Çakılpınarı, Akçadağ =

Village in Turkey

Çakılpınarı
- Neighbourhood
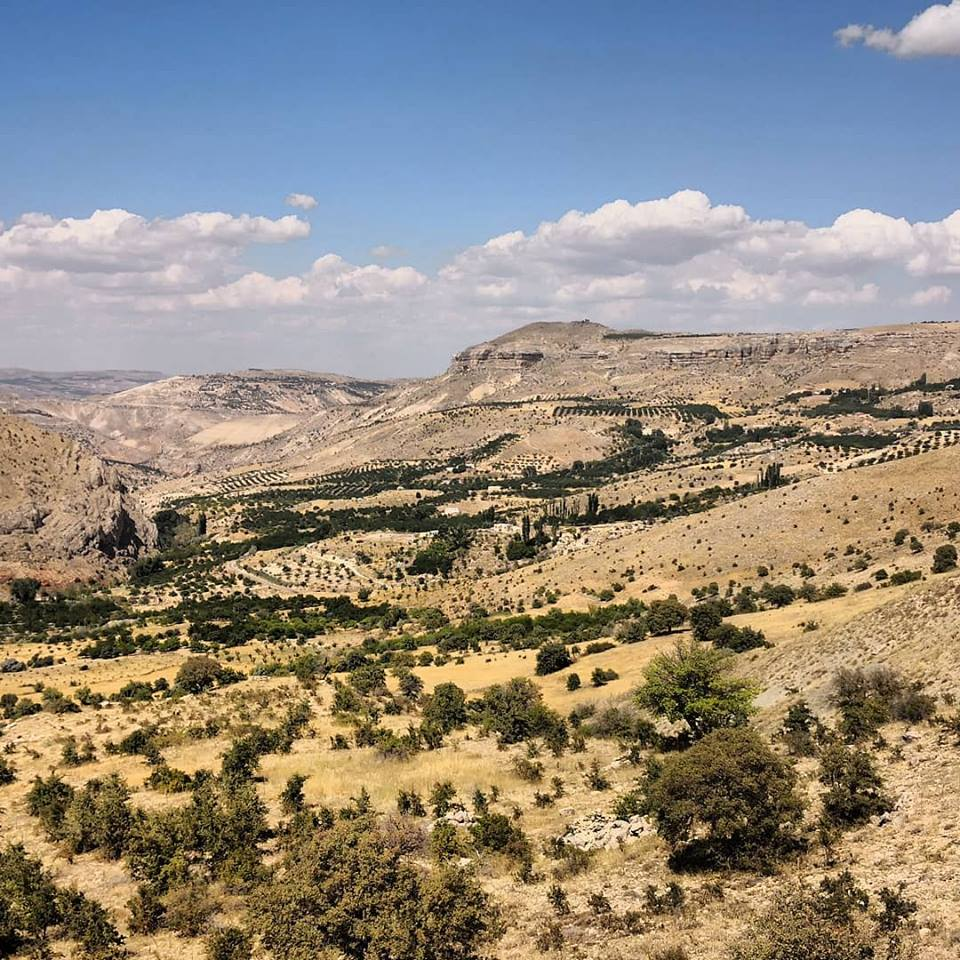

- Location within Turkey
- Coordinates: 38.391°N 37.781°E
- Country: Turkey
- Province: Malatya
- District: Akçadağ
- Population (2025): 131
- Time zone: UTC+3 (TRT)

Çakılpınarı, also known as Bilamuşağı, is a neighbourhood in the municipality and district of Akçadağ, Malatya Province in Turkey. It is populated by Kurds of the Kurecik tribe and had a population of 131 in 2025.
