= Akçadağ =

- District and municipality
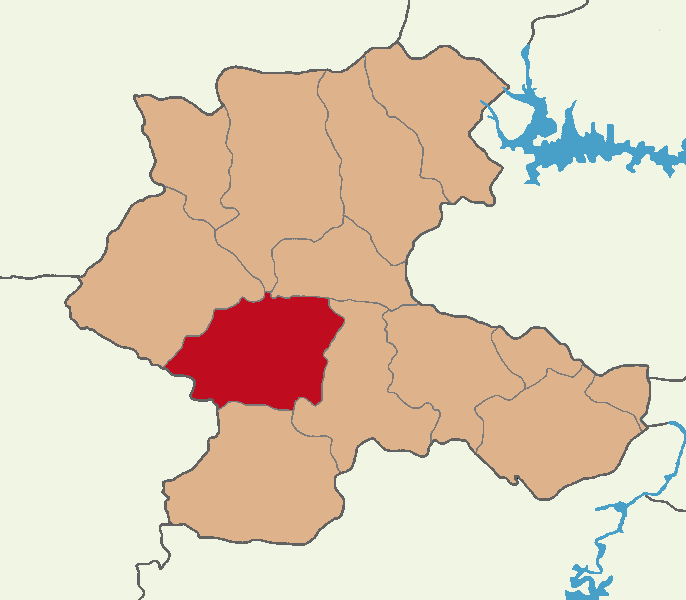
- Map showing Akçadağ District in Malatya Province

- Location within Turkey
- Coordinates: 38°20′20″N 37°58′12″E
- Country: Turkey
- Province: Malatya

Government
  - Mayor: Hasan Ulutaş (AKP)
- Area: 1,118 km^{2} (432 sq mi)
- Population (2022): 28,249
  - Density: 25.27/km^{2} (65.44/sq mi)
- Time zone: UTC+3 (TRT)
- Postal code: 44000
- Area code: 0422
- Website: www.akcadag.bel.tr

Akçadağ is a municipality and district of Malatya Province, Turkey. Its area is 1,118 km^{2}, and its population is 28,249 (2022). The mayor is Hasan Ulutaş (AKP).

== Geography ==
Akçadağ is at an altitude of 1,050 m (3,440 ft) above sea level and the district is considered mountainous.

== History ==
In Roman times, Akçadağ was known as Arca (lat) and became in the times of emperor Hadrian or Marcus Aurelius a colonia. The town became later a bishopric (suffragan of the diocese of Melitene), whose bishops participated in the councils of 431, 451, 553 and 680-81. In the Byzantine Empire, the town was known as Arka.

Akçadağ and its surroundings, particularly during the Dulkadir Beylik period, witnessed significant settlement by various Turkmen communities. Alongside the Harbendelu and Mihmadlu Yörüks, who formed the core of the Dulkadir population, Oghuz tribes such as Avşar, Kınık, Karkın, Döğer, and Bayındır settled in the region at different times, leading to its complete Turkification. Today, village names and surnames bearing these tribal names are still commonly encountered. Ottoman chronicles record that Yıldırım Bayezid seized Malatya from the Turkmens.

On 24 Jan 2020, the town was impacted by a magnitude 6.7 earthquake.

== Composition ==
There are 77 neighbourhoods in Akçadağ District:

- Aksaray
- Aksüt
- Aktepe
- Aliçeri
- Altınlı
- Ancar
- Aşağıörükçü
- Aydınlar
- Bağköy
- Bahri
- Başpınar
- Bayramuşağı
- Bekiruşağı
- Bölüklü
- Büyükçimiş
- Büyükköy
- Çakılpınarı
- Çatalbahçe
- Çevirme
- Çobanuşağı
- Darıca
- Dedeköy
- Demirciler
- Develi
- Doğanlar
- Doğantepe
- Doğu
- Dümüklü
- Durulova
- Dutlu
- Eğin
- Esenbey
- Esenli
- Fatih
- Gölpinar
- Güneşli
- Gürkaynak
- Hançerli
- Hartut
- Harunuşağı
- İkinciler
- Ilıcak
- Kadıibrahim
- Kahyalı
- Karamağara
- Karapınar
- Kasımuşağı
- Kayadibi
- Keklikpınar
- Keller
- Kepez
- Kolköy
- Kömekavak
- Kotangölü
- Kozluca
- Küçükkürne
- Kültür
- Kurtuşağı
- Levent
- Mezra
- Mihmanlı
- Muratlı
- Ören
- Ortaköy
- Resuluşağı
- Sahilköy
- Sakalıuzun
- Sarıhacı
- Şeyhler
- Taşevler
- Taşolar
- Tataruşağı
- Yağmurlu
- Yalınbudak
- Yalınkaya
- Yaylımlı
- Yukarıörükçü

== See also ==
- Kürecik Radar Station, a NATO early-warning missile defense radar situated at Çat Tepe in Kürecik.
