= Highfield (Enfield ward) =

Electoral ward in London, England

- Electoral ward for the Enfield London Borough Council
- Borough: Enfield
- County: Greater London
- Population: 9,249 (2021)
- Area: 1.456 km²

Current electoral ward
- Created: 2022
- Councillors: 2

Highfield is an electoral ward in the London Borough of Enfield. The ward was first used in the 2022 elections and elects two councillors to Enfield London Borough Council.

== Geography ==
The ward is named after the area of Highfield.

== Councillors ==
Election	Councillors	
2022	Tim Leaver (Labour)	Nia Stevens (Labour)

== Elections ==
=== 2026 ===
Highfield (2)
Party	Candidate	Votes	%	±%
Conservative	Bambos Charalambous	1,112		
Conservative	Peter Charalambous	1,077		
Green	Ferhan Sterk	620		
Green	Eunice Szekir	564		
Labour	Nicki Adeleke	563		
Labour	Gizem Tiskaya	489		
Reform	Stuart John Sime	274		
Reform	James Andrew Theochari	237		
Enfield Community Independents Your Voice	Hasan Ali	127		
Liberal Democrats	Duarte Goncalves Dias da Silva	126		
Enfield Community Independents Your Voice	Nuran Ali	125		
Liberal Democrats	Darya Paun	115		
Turnout			41.7	+6.2
Conservative gain from Labour		Swing		
Conservative gain from Labour		Swing		

=== 2022 ===
Highfield (2)
Party	Candidate	Votes	%	±%
Labour	Tim Leaver	1,048	45.7	
Labour	Nia Stevens	960	41.9	
Conservative	Jacqueline Campbell	931	40.6	
Conservative	Tolga Suleyman	810	35.3	
Liberal Democrats	Lauren Fulbright	328	14.3	
Liberal Democrats	Darya Paun	258	11.3	
Green	Nicola Rose Scott	248	10.8	
Turnout			35.5	
Labour hold		Swing		
Labour hold		Swing		
