= Oakwood (Enfield ward) =

Electoral ward in London, England

- Electoral ward for the Enfield London Borough Council
- Borough: Enfield
- County: Greater London
- Population: 8,747 (2021)
- Major settlements: Oakwood
- Area: 2.200 km²

Current electoral ward
- Created: 2022
- Councillors: 2

Oakwood is an electoral ward in the London Borough of Enfield. The ward was first used in the 2022 elections and elects two councillors to Enfield London Borough Council. It was previously used from 1964 to 2002.

== Geography ==
The ward is named after the suburb of Oakwood.

== Councillors ==
Election	Councillors	
2022	Tom O'Halloran (Conservative)	Julian Sampson (Conservative)

== Elections ==
=== 2026 ===
Oakwood (2)
Party	Candidate	Votes	%	±%
Conservative	James Bone	1,607		
Conservative	Thomas M O'Halloran	1,511		
Green	Basil Thomas Clarke	619		
Green	Nabila Porte	590		
Labour	Adam Kayani	370		
Reform	John Gristwood	345		
Labour	Linda Shaverin Hirsh	334		
Reform	Michael Akubueze	316		
Liberal Democrats	Adamantios Harrison	186		
Liberal Democrats	David Peters	148		
Turnout			49.7	+8.1
Conservative hold		Swing		
Conservative hold		Swing		

=== 2022 ===
Oakwood (2)
Party	Candidate	Votes	%	±%
Conservative	Tom O'Halloran	1,330	52.6	
Conservative	Julian Sampson	1,319	52.2	
Labour	Angie McEvoy	839	33.2	
Labour	Karl Vidol	694	27.5	
Green	Kevin Wilson	309	12.2	
Liberal Democrats	David Peters	288	11.4	
Liberal Democrats	Brian Cronk	276	10.9	
Turnout			41.6	
Conservative win (new seat)				
Conservative win (new seat)				
