= Altınlı, Akçadağ =

Village in Turkey

Altınlı
- Neighbourhood
- Location in Turkey
- Coordinates: 38.276°N 38.001°E
- Country: Turkey
- Province: Malatya
- District: Akçadağ
- Population (2025): 247
- Time zone: UTC+3 (TRT)

Altınlı (Kurdish: Keremis) is a neighbourhood in the municipality and district of Akçadağ, Malatya Province in Turkey. It is populated by Kurds and had a population of 247 in 2025.
