= Feryal Clark =

British Labour politician

Feryal Clark MP
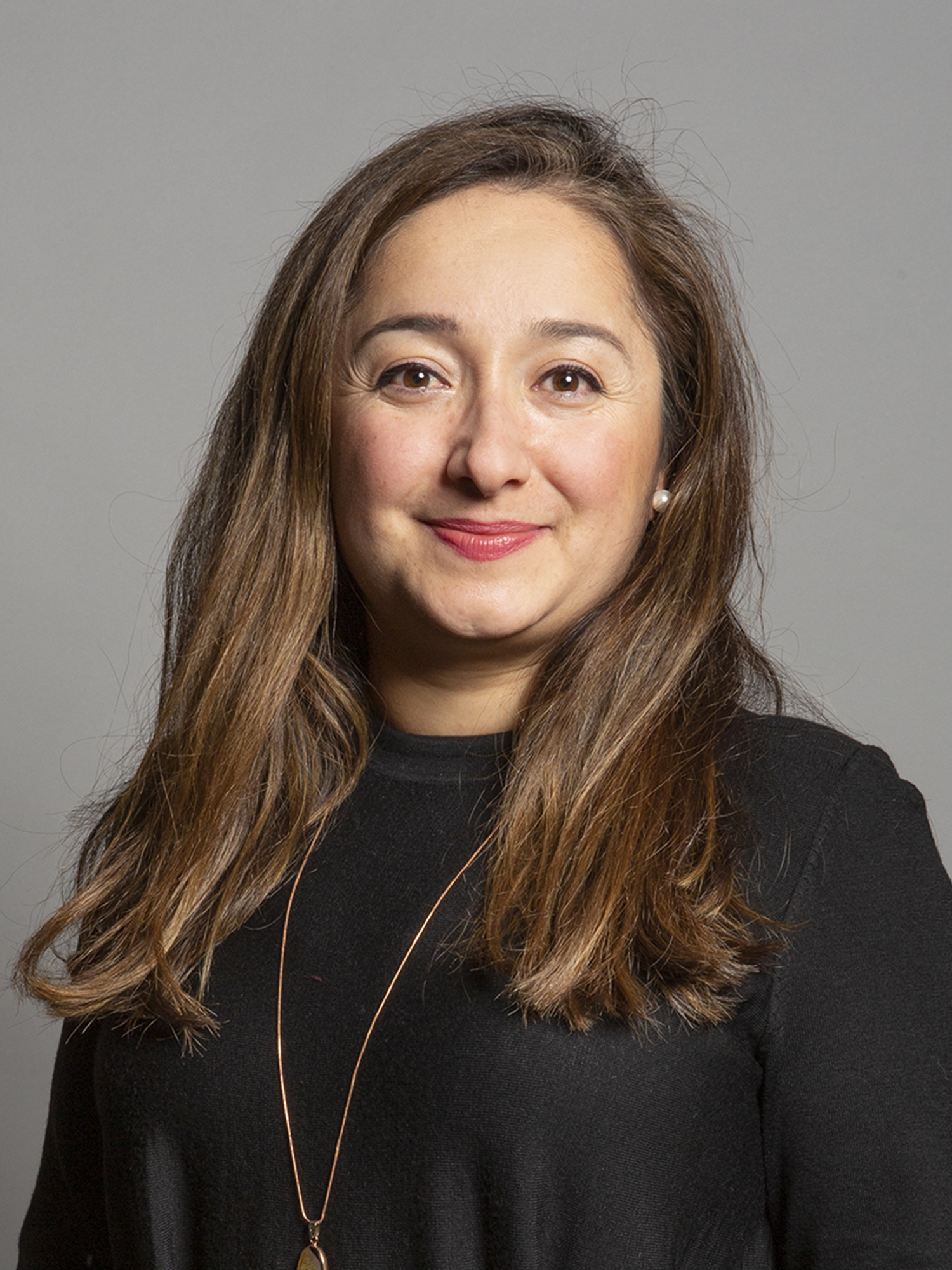
- Official portrait, 2019

Parliamentary Under-Secretary of State for AI and Digital Government
- In office 7 July 2024 – 7 September 2025
- Prime Minister: Keir Starmer
- Preceded by: The Viscount Camrose
- Succeeded by: Kanishka Narayan

Member of Parliament for Enfield North
- Incumbent
- Assumed office 12 December 2019
- Preceded by: Joan Ryan
- Majority: 12,736 (29.3%)

Personal details
- Born: Feryal Demirci; 6 January 1979 (age 47) Malatya, Turkey
- Party: Labour
- Website: Official website

Feryal Demirci Clark (/ˈfɛriəl/; née Demirci; born 6 January 1979) is a British Labour Party politician who has served as Member of Parliament (MP) for Enfield North since 2019. She served as Parliamentary Under-Secretary of State for AI and Digital Government from July 2024 to September 2025.

== Early life and education ==
Feryal Demirci was born on 6 January 1979 in Malatya, Turkey to Kurdish Alevi parents with roots in Kepez, Malatya Province. Clark moved to London at the age of 8, where she began learning Turkish from her neighbours, with assistance from "a Turkish book titled The Communist Manifesto for Kids," Clark has further stated that her family has always been involved in left-leaning politics. She did a degree in biomedical science followed by a master's in bioinformatics at the University of Exeter, and worked in the NHS in Pathology for six years.

== Political career ==
Clark was elected as a councillor for Brownswood ward in the London Borough of Hackney in 2006, representing it until 2014 when she was elected for Hoxton East & Shoreditch ward. She rose to become the deputy mayor of Hackney and cabinet member for health, social care, leisure and parks. As a councillor she promoted cycling in the Hackney borough.

Clark endorsed Yvette Cooper during the 2015 leadership election.

She was seventh on Labour's London-wide list for the 2016 London Assembly election, but was not elected.

== Parliamentary career ==
At the 2019 general election, Clark was elected to Parliament as MP for Enfield North with 51.8% of the vote and a majority of 6,492. She became Labour's first ever Kurdish MP. She made her maiden speech in a Commons debate on Health and Social Care.

Clark endorsed Lisa Nandy for Leader of the Labour Party during the 2020 leadership election. She is a supporter of Labour Friends of Israel.

In the November 2021 opposition front bench reshuffle, she was appointed Shadow Minister for Primary Care and Patient Safety.

In January 2022, Clark called on UK Government to recognize the Armenian genocide. She has said "I was born in south-east Turkey and grew up hearing stories about the horrors faced by the Armenian people in that region. Almost 100 years ago, a whole culture and a whole people were systematically destroyed and had their identity erased in an act of appalling violence. Families were torn apart, with children never seeing their parents again. Some 1.5 million Armenian men, women and children were killed. Vibrant, centuries-old communities were simply wiped off the face of the map".

In the September 2023 British shadow cabinet reshuffle, she was appointed Shadow Minister for Health.

At the 2024 general election, Clark was re-elected to Parliament as MP for Enfield North with a decreased vote share of 49.1% and an increased majority of 12,736. Following the election, Clark was appointed Parliamentary Under-Secretary of State for AI and Digital Government as part of the Department for Science Innovation and technology in Prime Minister Keir Starmer's new government.

Parliament of the United Kingdom
Preceded by Joan Ryan	Member of Parliament for Enfield North; 2019–present	Incumbent
