= Enfield Lock (ward) =

Electoral ward in London, England

- Electoral ward for the Enfield London Borough Council
- Borough: Enfield
- County: Greater London
- Population: 17,818 (2021)
- Major settlements: Enfield Lock
- Area: 3.252 km²

Current electoral ward
- Created: 1982
- Councillors: 3

Enfield Lock is an electoral ward in the London Borough of Enfield. The ward was first used in the 1982 elections and elects three councillors to Enfield London Borough Council.

== Geography ==
The ward is named after the suburb of Enfield Lock.

== Councillors ==
Election	Councillors		
2014	Krystle Fonyonga (Labour)	Nneka Keazor (Labour)	Ozzie Uzoanya (Labour)
2018	Birsen Demirel (Labour)	Guner Aydin (Labour)	Elif Erbil (Labour)
2022	Sabri Ozaydin (Labour)	Suna Hurman (Labour)	Eylem Yuruk (Labour)
2026	Sarah Jons (Green)	Suna Hurman (Labour)	Ratip Alsulaiman (Green)

== Elections ==
=== 2026 ===
Enfield Lock (3)
Party	Candidate	Votes	%	±%
Green	Sarah Jons	1,128		
Labour	Suna Hurman	1,117		
Green	Ratip Alsulaiman	1,100		
Labour	Sabri Ozaydin	1,063		
Green	Bernie Rees	1,010		
Labour	Eylem Yuruk	974		
Conservative	John Joseph Bennet	802		
Conservative	Tim Cela	727		
Conservative	Austin Spreadbury	665		
Reform	Paul Stephen Conway	648		
Reform	Gary Alan Robbens	588		
Reform	Blueu Eves	575		
Liberal Democrats	Margaret Steel	182		
Liberal Democrats	Chris Le'Candharwood	169		
Liberal Democrats	Michael Steel	123		
CPA	Neville Kenneth Watson	101		
TUSC	Josh Asker	47		
Turnout			34.6	+3.9
Green gain from Labour		Swing		
Labour hold		Swing		
Green gain from Labour		Swing		

=== 2022 ===
Enfield Lock (3)
Party	Candidate	Votes	%	±%
Labour	Suna Hurman	2,077	66.8	
Labour	Eylem Yuruk	1,864	59.9	
Labour	Sabri Ozaydin	1,856	59.7	
Conservative	Maxwell Day	933	30.0	
Conservative	Paul Desmonde	916	29.5	
Conservative	Arthur Bishop-Laggett	870	28.0	
Green	Bernie Rees	486	15.6	
Liberal Democrats	Norman Whitby	328	10.5	
Turnout			30.7	
Labour hold		Swing		
Labour hold		Swing		
Labour hold		Swing		
