= Kepez, Akçadağ =

Village in Turkey

Kepez
- Neighbourhood
- Location in Turkey
- Coordinates: 38.339°N 37.745°E
- Country: Turkey
- Province: Malatya
- District: Akçadağ
- Population (2025): 444
- Time zone: UTC+3 (TRT)

Kepez, also known as Kürecik, is a neighbourhood in the municipality and district of Akçadağ, Malatya Province in Turkey. It is populated by Kurds of the Kurecik tribe and had a population of 444 in 2025.

== Notable people ==
- Feryal Clark
