= Ponders End (ward) =

Electoral ward in London, England

- Electoral ward for the Enfield London Borough Council
- Borough: Enfield
- County: Greater London
- Population: 13,682 (2021)
- Major settlements: Ponders End
- Area: 3.300 km²

Current electoral ward
- Created: 1965
- Councillors: 3

Ponders End is an electoral ward in the London Borough of Enfield. The ward was first used in the 1964 elections and elects two councillors to Enfield London Borough Council.

== Geography ==
The ward is named after the suburb of Ponders End.

== Councillors ==
Election	Councillors	
2022	Nicki Adeleke (Labour)	Mohammad Islam (Labour) (Independent since 2025)

== Elections ==
=== 2026 ===
Ponders End (2)
Party	Candidate	Votes	%	±%
Liberal Democrats	Rob Brassett			
Enfield Community Independents	Hakan Kaygili			
Labour	Niamh O'Brien			
TUSC	Ian Pattison			
Reform	Rickey Powell			
Labour	Talal Rajab			
Liberal Democrats	James Rooke			
Conservative	Rachel Shawcross			
Conservative	Ceng Yavuz			
Green	Aziz Yildiz			
Reform	Kirk Young			
Turnout				

=== 2022 ===
Ponders End (2)
Party	Candidate	Votes	%	±%
Labour	Nicki Adeleke	1,354	60.2	
Labour	Mohammad Amirul Islam	1,316	58.5	
Conservative	Md Uddin	647	28.7	
Conservative	Anupama Prasad	536	23.8	
Green	Andreea Malin	243	10.8	
Liberal Democrats	Robert Brassett	237	10.5	
Liberal Democrats	Brian Sekitto	169	7.5	
Turnout			31.6	
Labour hold		Swing		
Labour hold		Swing		
