= Parks and open spaces in the London Borough of Enfield =

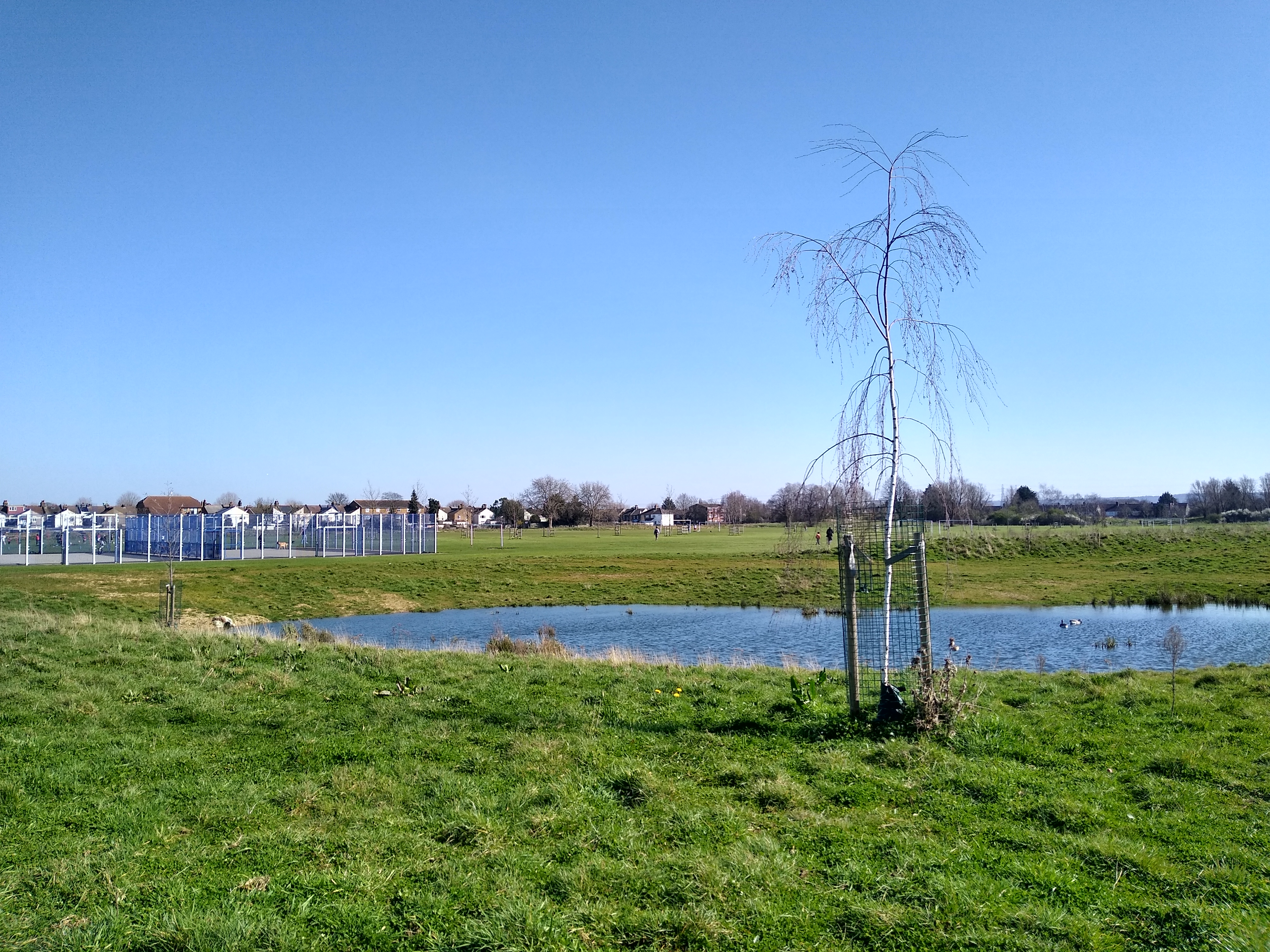
Albany Park

The London Borough of Enfield is the northernmost of the Outer London boroughs. The borough lies within the Metropolitan Green Belt, and several of its 123 or more parks and open spaces are part of it. The ancient Enfield Chase, remnants of which still exist, occupied much of the area. In addition to many playgrounds and sports facilities (including a number of golf courses), the main areas of public open space are:

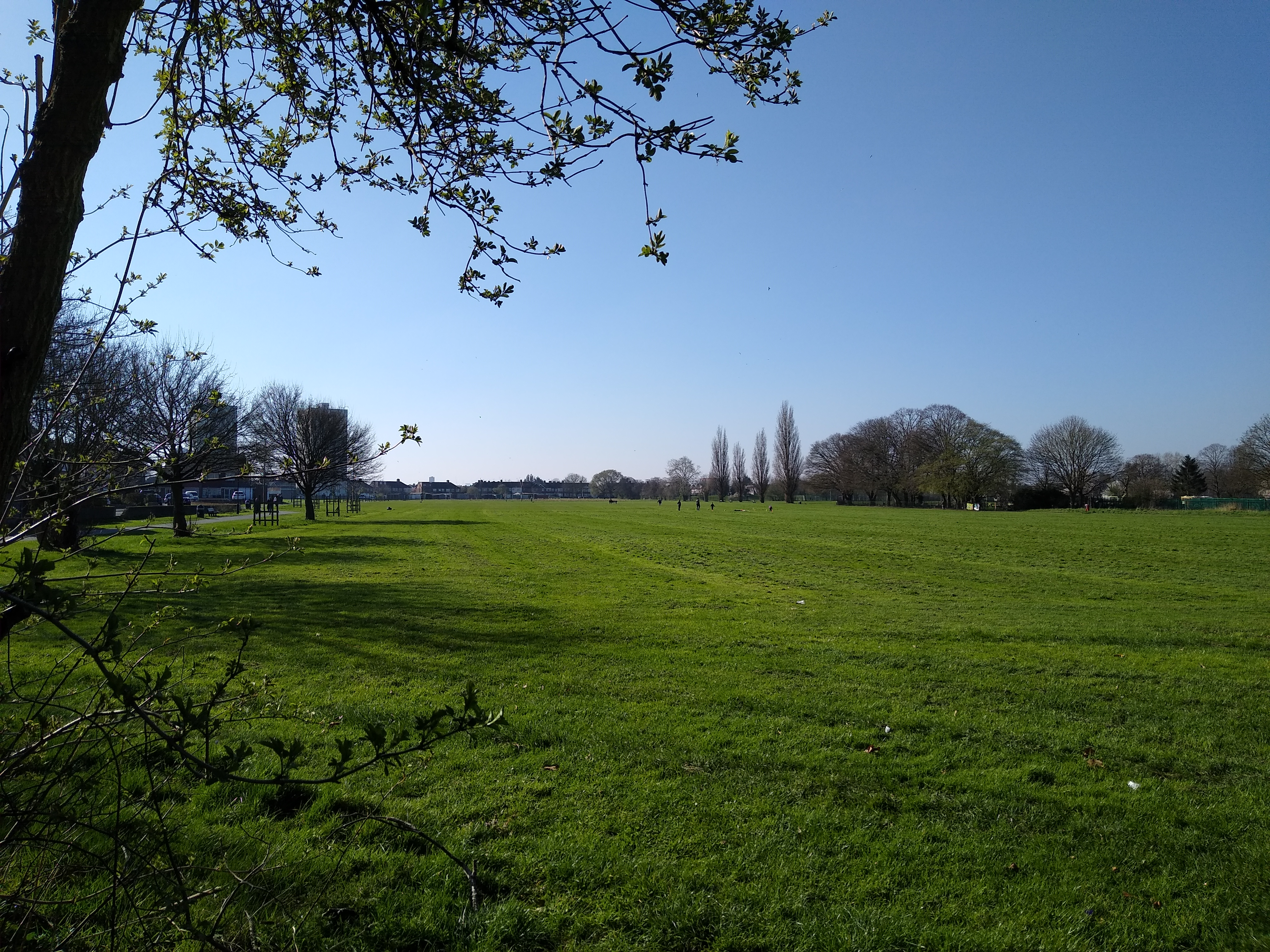
Durants Park

- Albany Park: Enfield Wash, 45 acres (0.18 km^{2}), formally opened 1902, since extended; west of Enfield Lock railway station
- Arnos Park, Arnos Grove, 44 acres (0.18 km^{2}), opened in 1928, north of Arnos Grove tube station; Pymmes Brook Trail passes through it
- Beech Hill Park, Hadley Wood, includes Hadley Wood Golf Course
- Broomfield Park, Palmers Green, 54 acres (0.22 km^{2}), purchased 1903
- Bullsmoor Playing Fields, Freezywater
- Bury Lodge Gardens Edmonton
- Bush Hill Park Recreation Ground Bush Hill Park, officially opened on 18 April 1911
- Churchfields Recreation Ground Edmonton
- Craig Park, Edmonton
- Cunningham Park, Freezywater
- Durants Park, Enfield Highway, created in 1903
- Firs Farm (Firs Lane Winchmore Hill London N21 2PJ)
- Forty Hall Park, an estate of 273 acres (1.10 km^{2}), managed by Enfield Borough, includes woodlands and grounds around Forty Hall
- Grovelands Park, Southgate
- Hilly Fields, near Gordon Hill railway station, 62 acres (0.25 km^{2}), purchased 1911
- Hollywood Gardens, Edmonton
- Jubilee Park, Lower Edmonton
- King George's Field, Enfield Highway, opened in 1939 to commemorate the Silver Jubilee of King George V and Queen Mary in 1935
- Minchenden Oak Garden, Southgate
- Montagu Road Recreation Ground, Edmonton
- Oakwood Park, 64 acres (0.26 km^{2}), purchased 1927
- Plevna Road Open Space, Edmonton
- Ponders End Recreation Ground (Ryans Park), Ponders End
- Pymmes Park, Edmonton, 53 acres (0.21 km^{2}), purchased 1899
- Ryans Park, Enfield Highway
- Tatem Park, Edmonton
- Town Park, Enfield Town, which incorporates the last public remnant of Enfield Old Park
- Trent Park, country park
- Whitewebbs Park

Apart from those open spaces, there are the two large reservoirs. The King George V and the William Girling, collectively known as the Chingford Reservoirs, are situated alongside the River Lea in the east of the borough.

Covert Way is Enfield's only Local Nature Reserve.
