= Enfield Lock =

Coordinates: 51.6686°N 0.026°W

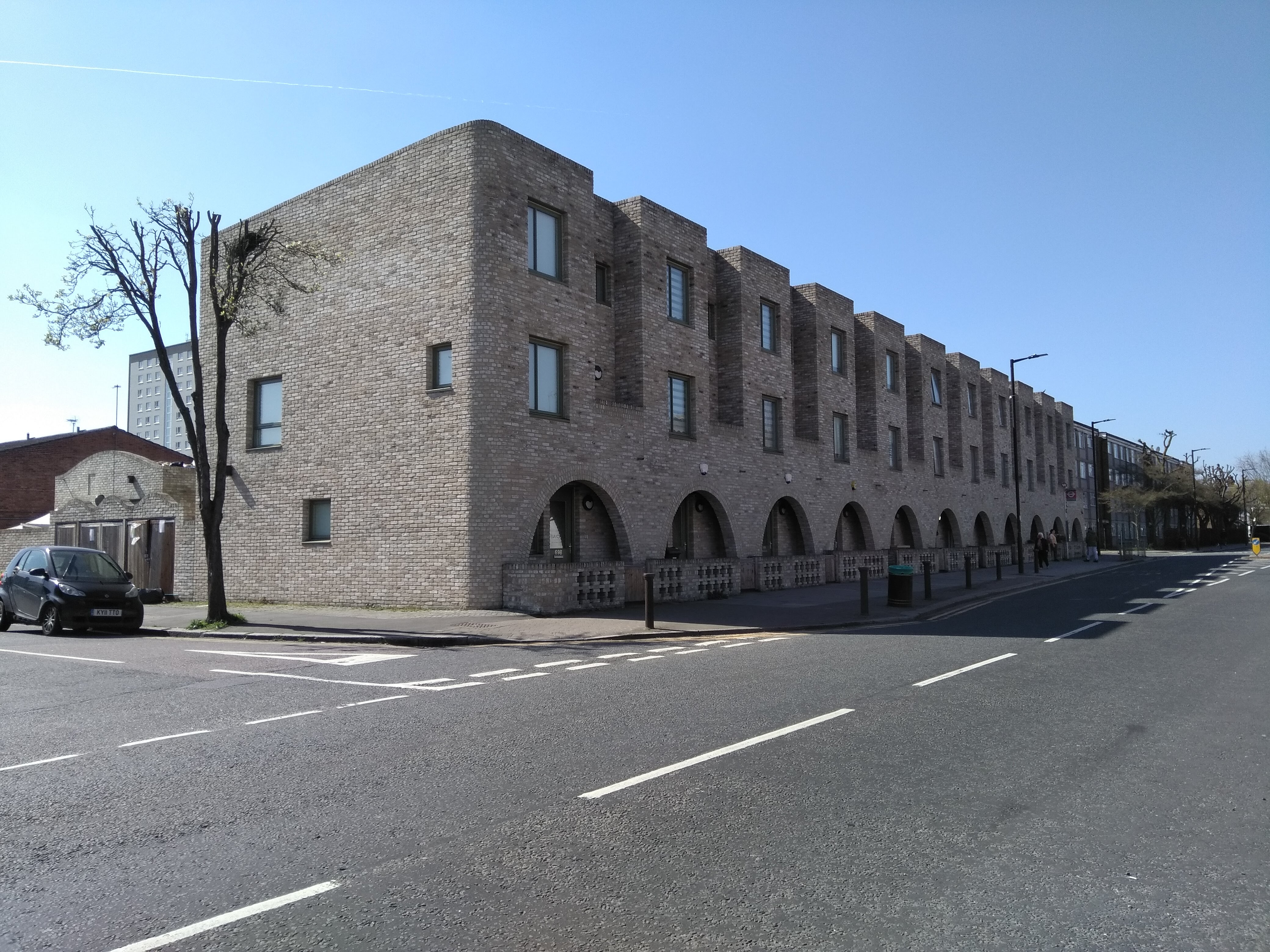
- Modern housing in Ordnance Road

- Location within Greater London
- Population: 16,469 (2011 Census. Ward)
- OS grid reference: TQ365985
- London borough: Enfield
- Ceremonial county: Greater London
- Region: London
- Country: England
- Sovereign state: United Kingdom
- Post town: ENFIELD
- Postcode district: EN3
- Dialling code: 01992 / 020
- Police: Metropolitan
- Fire: London
- Ambulance: London
- UK Parliament: Enfield North
- London Assembly: Enfield and Haringey

Enfield Lock is an area in the London Borough of Enfield, north London. It is approximately located east of the Hertford Road between Turkey Street and the Holmesdale Tunnel overpass, and extends to the River Lee Navigation, including Enfield Island Village. The locality gains its name from the lock on the River Lee Navigation. Today's Enfield Lock was rebuilt in 1922. The area forms part of the Lee Valley Park and the Enfield Lock Conservation Area. On its eastern boundary Enfield Lock has marshland formerly used as a testing site between the Royal Small Arms Factory and the Gunpowder Mills. Beyond this is the hamlet of Sewardstone and the boundary of Epping Forest. To the south is Brimsdown; to the north Waltham Cross; and to the west Bullsmoor and Freezywater. Enfield Lock forms part of the boundary of Greater London.

== Etymology ==
Enfield Lock is recorded thus in 1710, earlier as Norhtlok (1355), The Locke (1657), i.e. 'the (northern) lock or river barrier (near Enfield)', from Middle English lok.

== History ==
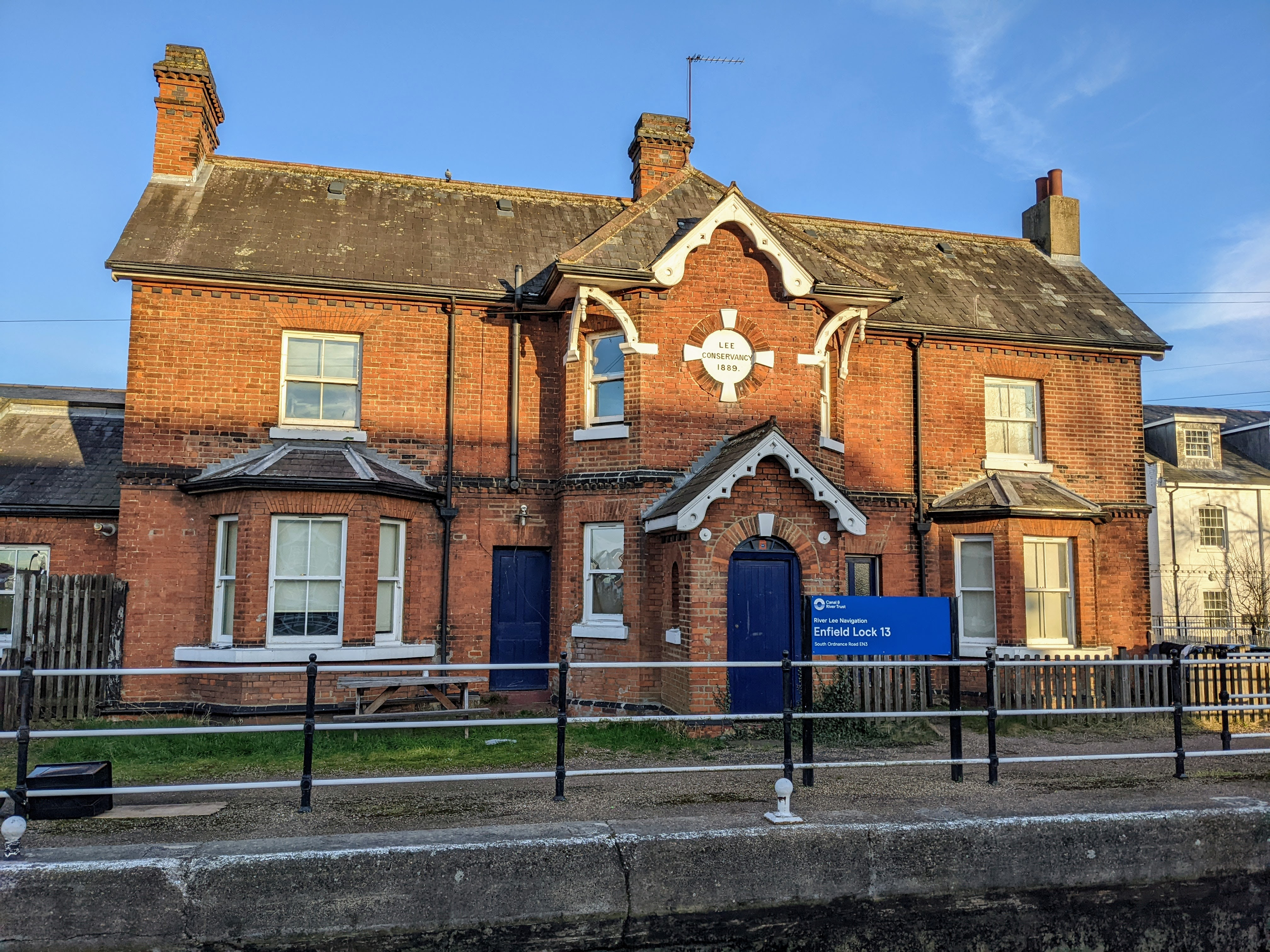
Enfield Lock

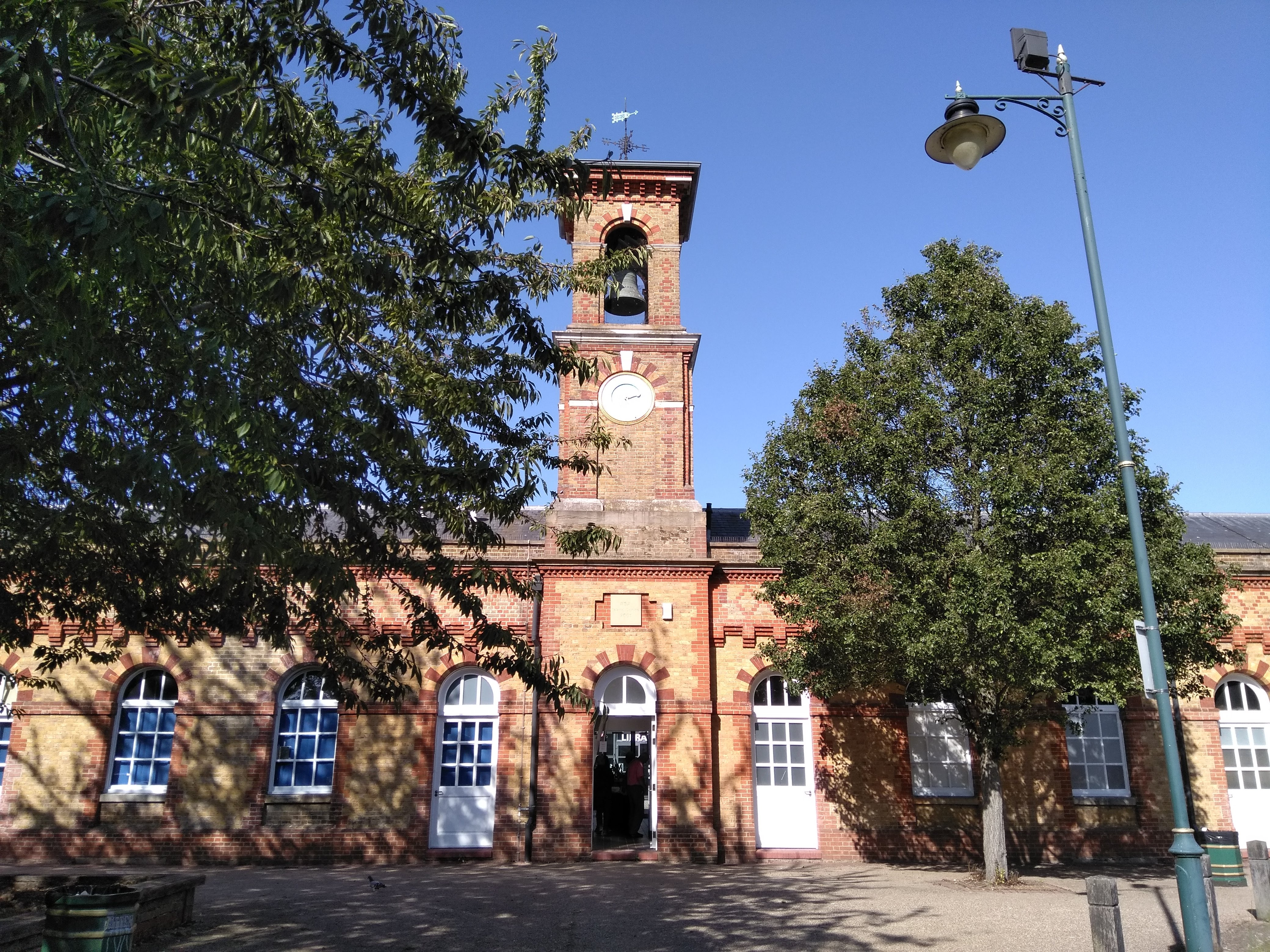
Royal Small Arms Factory

The area was first developed from about 1812 when a government-owned rifle factory, which was later known as the Royal Small Arms Factory (RSAF), Enfield, was built. The factory was built towards the end of the Napoleonic War on the instructions of the Board of Ordnance on marshland at Enfield Lock on the banks of both the River Lea and the River Lee Navigation. The RSAF was closed in the late 1980s, shortly after privatisation, and the majority of the former site has now been redeveloped into a large housing development: Enfield Island Village.

The original machine shop frontage and the older part of the rear structure has been retained and was converted into workshops and retail units by the Enfield Enterprise Agency. Until the construction of the M25 in the 1980s, the Enfield island Village which began to house many families from local councils such as Harringey and Hackney, and the later building of the A1055, the area was much like a village with only a small population and consisting of only a few roads in the locality. Roads such as Ordnance Road, Salisbury Road and Medcalf Road are still populated by families who have lived in the Enfield Lock area for several generations.

== 2011 riots ==
After rioting had spread from neighbouring Tottenham on 8 August 2011, the Sony DADC/PIAS distribution centre on the Innova Business Park was looted and destroyed by fire. The Home Secretary, Theresa May, was shown the destroyed distribution centre by chief police officers and firefighters on 12 August 2011. In September 2012, the Prime Minister, David Cameron, opened the rebuilt warehouse.

== Demography ==
The Enfield Lock ward, which also covers Enfield Island Village, is 54% white (38% British, 15% Other, 1% Irish) as of the 2011 census. 23% of the population is black (15% African, 8% Caribbean, 4% Other).

== Locale ==
=== Nearest places ===
- Freezywater
- Brimsdown
- Enfield Wash
- Enfield Island Village
- Rammey Marsh

== Transport ==
=== Rail ===
- Enfield Lock railway station - Greater Anglia services northbound towards Harlow and Bishop's Stortford, and southbound towards Tottenham Hale and Stratford in the East End. Some services terminate at Liverpool Street in the City of London.
- Turkey Street railway station - London Overground services from Cheshunt (northbound) to Liverpool Street via Seven Sisters and Hackney Downs (southbound).
- Brimsdown railway station

Enfield Lock and Turkey Street are in London fare zone 6. Brimsdown is in London fare zone 5. Oyster Cards are valid at all three stations for travel southbound, and northbound as far as Broxbourne, or on some services, Hertford East.

=== Road ===
The A1010 (Hertford Road) passes north–south to the west of Enfield Lock, linking the area to Edmonton and Tottenham to the south, and Waltham Cross, Waltham Abbey and Cheshunt to the north. The A1055 (Mollison Avenue) links Enfield Lock to the A10 (Great Cambridge Road) towards Hertford. Southbound, the road passes through Brimsdown, Ponder's End and Tottenham Hale.

The M25 London Orbital Motorway forms the northern border of Enfield Lock. From Enfield Lock, the road can be accessed via the A10 at junction 25, to the north of Bulls Cross. The M25 carries traffic around London, giving Enfield Lock a direct link to Heathrow Airport, the M11 (for Stansted Airport) and the M1 (for Luton Airport), along with several other arterial routes across both East Anglia and South East England. The M25 passes through the Holmesdale Tunnel, just to the north of Enfield Lock.

=== Canal ===
The River Lee Navigation passes north–south through Enfield Lock. The lock after which the area is named is numbered "13" along the River Lee.

The navigable river links boats northbound to Hertford and the River Stort. The River Stort is navigable for canal traffic to Harlow and Bishop's Stortford.

Southbound, the River Lee passes through Ponders End, Tottenham Hale and Stratford in the East End. From Stratford, the Hertford Union Canal carries canal traffic westbound towards the Regent's Canal, which eventually leads to Camden Lock and Paddington.

=== Cycling ===
Cycling infrastructure in Enfield Lock is primarily maintained by the London Borough of Enfield. Enfield Lock is well connected to National and International cycle networks:

- National Cycle Route 1 (NCR 1) - runs north–south through Enfield Lock on the River Lee towpath. NCR 1 is an unbroken, signed cycle route between Dover, Kent and the Shetland Islands, Scotland. The route links Enfield Lock directly with Tottenham, Stratford, Victoria Park and Canary Wharf to the south. To the north, the route passes through Waltham Abbey, Roydon and Harlow.
- NCR 12 - runs on bridleways and residential streets through Enfield Lock. The route joins NCR 1 at the lock. Leaving Enfield Lock westbound, the signposted route continues to Potter's Bar and Hatfield. The route is incomplete to the east of Botany Bay.
- Great Cambridge Road - a shared-use path runs parallel to the A10 Great Cambridge Road. To the north, the path carries cyclists towards Waltham Cross. To the south, the route passes through Enfield Town and Tottenham, via the Great Cambridge Junction.
- River Lee Towpath - a shared-use path carrying NCR 1, maintained by the Canal and River Trust. When NCR 1 leaves the towpath, the route continues towards Hertford.
- EuroVelo 2 "The Capitals Route" - an international cycle route from Moscow, Russia to Galway, Ireland. In the UK, the route runs between Harwich and Holyhead. The route follows that of NCR 1 through Enfield Lock.

== Schools ==
- Primary schools: Chesterfield Infant School, Chesterfield Junior School, Keys Meadow Primary, Prince of Wales Primary School
- Secondary Schools: Oasis Academy Enfield

== Recreation ==
Section 18 of the London LOOP, a long distance footpath, can be accessed at Enfield Lock railway station. The path connects with the Lea Valley Walk above Enfield Lock at Ordnance Road.

Angling is allowed on the River Lee Navigation upstream and downstream of Enfield Lock. Information from the River Lea Anglers Club.

National Cycle Route 1 follows the River Lea towpath to Gunpowder Park.

Gunpowder Park, which lies to the east of Enfield Lock, is a large open space consisting mostly of marshland and lakes. The land is owned and managed by the Lee Valley Regional Park and is open to the public.

== Politics ==
Enfield Lock is represented by the Enfield Lock ward for elections to Enfield London Borough Council.
