= Elizabeth Canning =

English maidservant who claimed to have been kidnapped

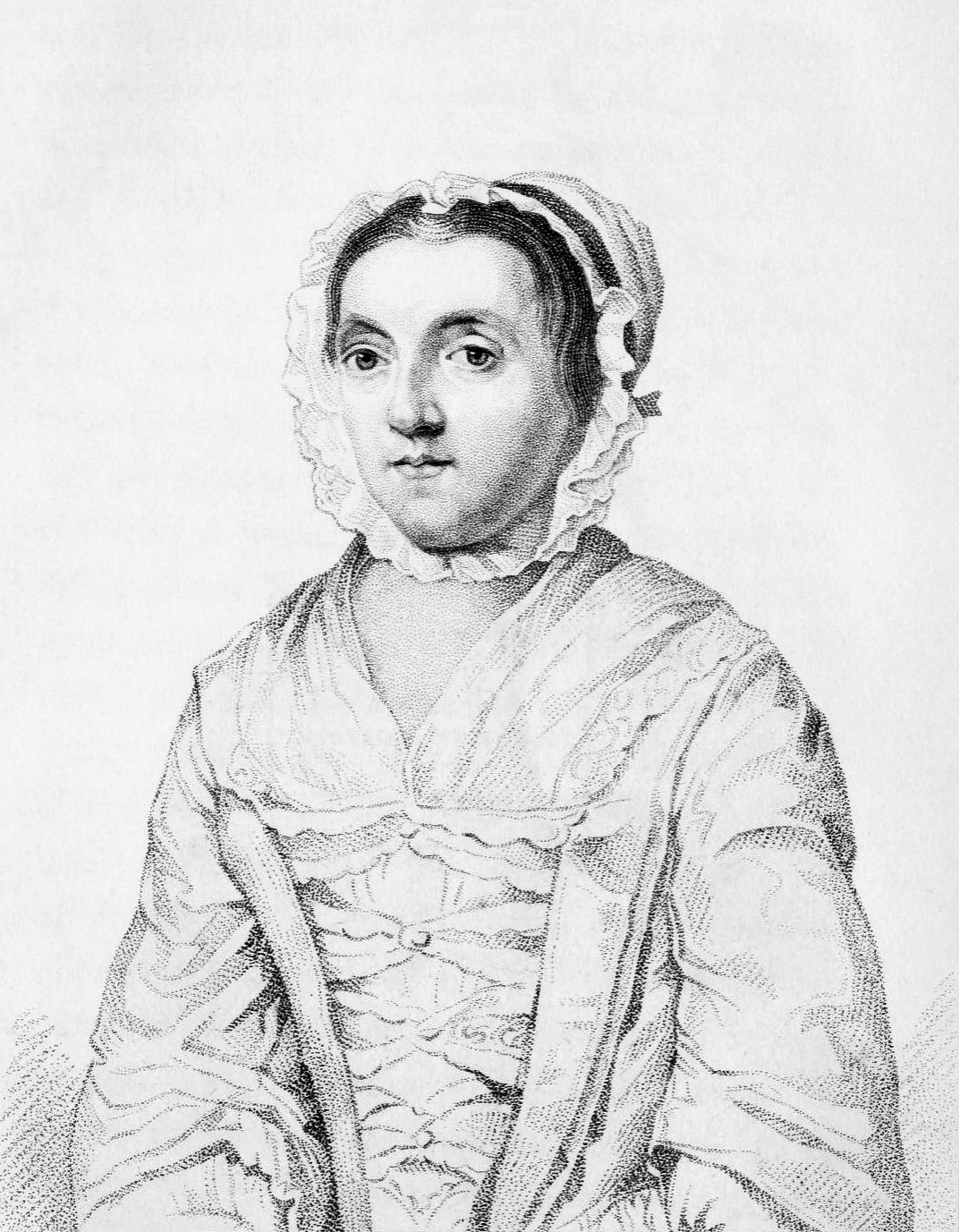
- As illustrated c. 1820
- Born: 17 September 1734; London, Great Britain
- Died: June 1773 (aged 38); Wethersfield, Connecticut Colony, British America
- Occupation: Maidservant
- Spouse: John Treat
- Children: 4
- Conviction: Perjury
- Penalty: Transportation

Elizabeth Canning (married name Treat; 17 September 1734 – June 1773) was an English maidservant who claimed to have been kidnapped and held against her will in a hayloft for almost a month. She ultimately became central to one of the most famous English criminal mysteries of the 18th century.

She disappeared on 1 January 1753 and returned almost a month later to her mother's home in Aldermanbury in the City of London, emaciated and in a "deplorable condition". After being questioned by concerned friends and neighbours, she was interviewed by the local alderman, who then issued an arrest warrant for Susannah Wells, the woman who occupied the house in which Canning was supposed to have been held. At Wells' house in Enfield Wash, Canning identified Mary Squires as another of her captors, prompting the arrest and detention of both Wells and Squires. London magistrate Henry Fielding became involved in the case, taking Canning's side. Further arrests were made and several witness statements were taken, and Wells and Squires were ultimately tried and found guilty—Squires of the more serious and potentially capital charge of theft.

However, Crisp Gascoyne, trial judge and Lord Mayor of London, was unhappy with the verdict and began his own investigation. He spoke with witnesses whose testimony implied that Squires and her family could not have abducted Canning, and he interviewed several of the prosecution's witnesses, some of whom recanted their earlier testimony. He ordered Canning's arrest, following which she was tried and found guilty of perjury. Squires was pardoned, and Canning sentenced to one month's imprisonment and seven years of transportation.

Canning's case pitted two groups of believers against one another: the pro-Canning "Canningites", and the pro-Squires "Egyptians". Gascoyne was openly abused and attacked in the street, while interested authors waged a fierce war of words over the fate of the young, often implacable maid. She died in Wethersfield, Connecticut in 1773, but the mystery surrounding her disappearance remains unsolved.

== History ==
=== Background ===
Canning was born on 17 September 1734 in the City of London, the eldest of five surviving children born to William (a carpenter) and Elizabeth Canning. The family lived in two rooms in Aldermanbury Postern (a northern extension of Aldermanbury that formerly ran from a postern gate on London Wall to Fore Street; it no longer exists) in London. Aldermanbury was a respectable but not particularly wealthy neighbourhood. Canning was born into poverty. Her father died in 1751 and her mother and four siblings shared a two-room property with James Lord, an apprentice. Lord occupied the building's front room, while Canning's family lived in the back room. Her schooling was limited to only a few months at a writing school, and aged 15 or 16 she worked as a maidservant in the household of nearby publican John Wintlebury, who considered her an honest but shy girl. From October 1752 she lived at the neighbouring home of a carpenter Edward Lyon, who shared Wintlebury's opinion of the young maidservant. Canning was described as a plump 18-year-old, about 5 feet (1.5 m) tall with a face pitted by smallpox, a long, straight nose, and wide-set eyes.

=== Disappearance ===
Canning disappeared on 1 January 1753. With no work that day, she spent time with her family and made plans to go shopping with her mother after visiting her aunt and uncle (Alice and Thomas Colley), but changed her mind and instead remained with them for the evening. At about 9 pm, accompanied by her aunt and uncle for about two-thirds of the journey, she left to return to her lodgings in Aldermanbury.

When she failed to return to her lodgings at Edward Lyon's house, her employer twice went looking for her at her mother's home. Mrs Canning sent her other three children to Moorfields to search for her, while James Lord went to the Colleys, who told him that they had left Elizabeth at about 9:30 pm near Aldgate church in Houndsditch. The next morning Mrs Canning also travelled to the Colleys' house, but to no avail as Elizabeth was still missing. Neighbours were asked if they knew of her whereabouts, and weeks passed as Mrs Canning searched the neighbourhood for her daughter, while her relatives scoured the city. An advertisement was placed in the newspapers, prayers were read aloud in churches and meeting houses but other than a report of a "woman's shriek" from a hackney coach on 1 January no clues were found as to Elizabeth's disappearance.

=== Reappearance ===
Canning reappeared at about 10 pm on 29 January 1753. At the sight of her daughter, whom she had not seen for almost a month, Elizabeth Canning fainted. Once recovered she sent James Lord to fetch several neighbours, and inside only a few minutes the house was full. Elizabeth was described as being in a "deplorable condition"; her face and hands were black with dirt, she wore a shift, a petticoat, and a bedgown. A dirty rag tied around her head was soaked with blood from a wounded ear. According to her story she had been attacked by two men near Bedlam Hospital. They had partially stripped her, robbed her and hit her in the temple, rendering her unconscious. She awoke "by a large road, where was water, with the two men that robbed me" and was forced to walk to a house, where an old woman asked if she would "go their way" (become a prostitute). Canning had refused, and the woman cut off her corset, slapped her face and pushed her upstairs into a loft. There the young maidservant had remained for almost a month, with no visitors and existing only on bread and water. The clothing she wore she had scavenged from a fireplace in the loft. Canning had eventually made her escape by pulling some boards away from a window and walking the five-hour journey home. She recalled hearing the name "Wills or Wells", and as she had seen through the window a coachman she recognised, thought she had been held on the Hertford Road. On this evidence, John Wintlebury and a local journeyman, Robert Scarrat, identified the house as that of "Mother" Susannah Wells at Enfield Wash, nearly 10 miles (16 km) distant.

Her reappearance and subsequent explanation (including the assumption that she had been held at Wells's house) were the following day printed in the London Daily Advertiser. (Note: Presumably submitted by those present when she had returned.) She was visited by the apothecary, but with her pulse faint, and so weak she could scarcely speak, she vomited up the medicine he gave her. He administered several clysters until satisfied with the results, following which Canning was taken by her friends and neighbours to the Guildhall to see Alderman Thomas Chitty, to ask that he issue a warrant for Wells's arrest.

==== Enfield Wash ====
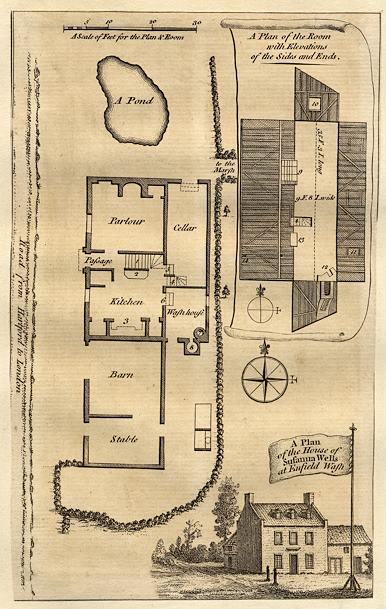
"A Plan of the house of Susanna Wells at Enfield Wash" from The London Magazine, 1754

Chitty issued the warrant and on 1 February Canning's friends took her to Enfield Wash. Despite her poor physical condition, Canning's supporters wanted her to identify her captors and the room she claimed to have been held in. Although worrying she might die before then, they took the risk of moving her. Wintlebury, Scarrat and Joseph Adamson (a neighbour) were the first to arrive, on horseback. They met the warrant officer and several peace officers, and waited for Susannah Wells to appear. Wells' house had served a variety of functions, including that of a carpenter's shop, a butcher's, and an ale-house. The old woman kept animals in the house and occasionally had lodgers. She had twice been widowed; her first husband was a carpenter and her second had been hanged for theft. She had also been imprisoned in 1736 for perjury. Sarah Howit, her daughter by her first husband, had lived there for about two years. Howit's brother John was a carpenter like his father, and lived nearby.

When at about 9 a.m. Wells entered her house, the officers immediately moved to secure the building. Inside they found Wells, an old woman named Mary Squires, her children, Virtue Hall, and a woman they supposed was Wells' daughter. Another woman, Judith Natus, was brought down from the loft to be questioned with the rest. The warrant officer who searched the loft was puzzled when he discovered that it did not resemble the room described by Canning, nor could he find evidence of her having jumped from the window. The rest of the party, who had by then arrived in a hired coach and chaise, were similarly surprised.

Canning, who had arrived in the chaise with her mother and two other people, was carried into the house by Adamson. There she identified Mary Squires as the woman who had cut off her stays, and claimed that Virtue Hall and a woman presumed to be Squires' daughter had been present at the time. Canning was then taken upstairs where she identified the loft as the room in which she had been imprisoned —although it contained more hay than she recalled. Boards covering the window appeared to have only recently been fastened there. With such damning evidence against them, the suspects were taken to a nearby justice of the peace, Merry Tyshemaker, who examined Canning alone, and then those from Wells's house. Squires and Wells were committed, the former for removing Canning's stays and the latter for "keeping a disorderly house". George Squires and Virtue Hall, who both denied any involvement in the kidnapping, were set free; Canning and her supporters were allowed home.

==== Fielding's investigation ====
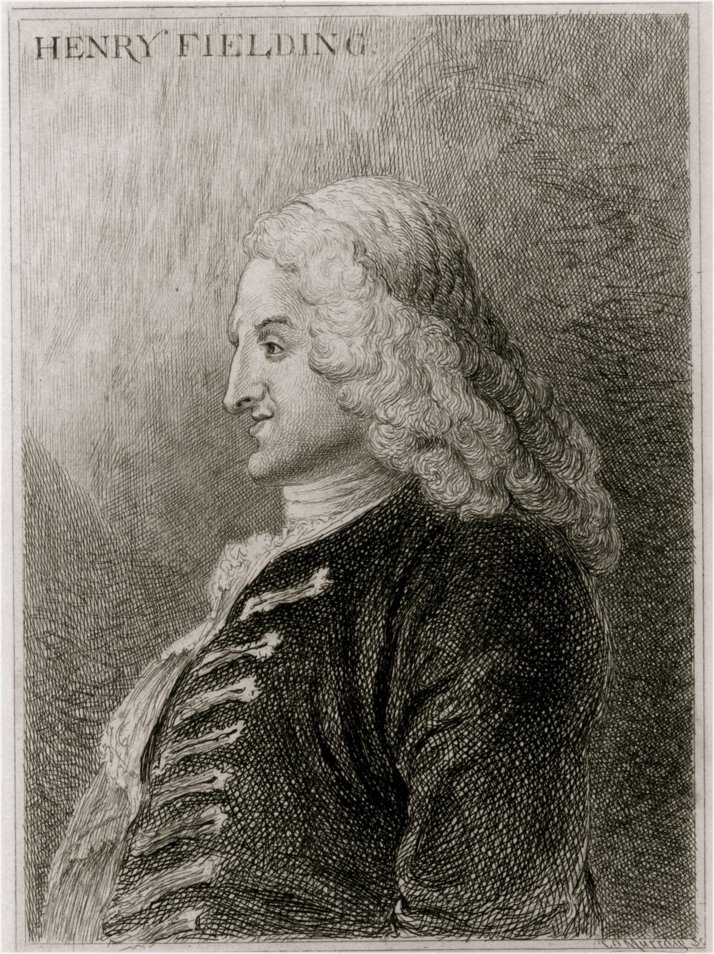
Henry Fielding investigated Canning's claims

Assault in 18th-century England was viewed by the authorities not as a breach of the peace, but rather as a civil action between two parties in dispute. The onus therefore was on Canning to take legal action against those she claimed had imprisoned her, and she would also be responsible for investigating the crime. This was an expensive proposition and she would therefore require the help of her friends and neighbours to pursue her case. An additional complication was that rather than send such matters to trial, justices preferred to reconcile the parties concerned. Therefore, although it was the state in which she returned to them on 29 January which most offended Canning's friends, it was the theft of her stays—valued then at about 10 shillings—that was the most promising aspect of the case. The theft could be tried under a capital statute, making the assault charge less worthy of legal attention.

While Canning's medical treatment continued, her supporters, mostly men, prepared the case against Squires and Wells. They took legal advice from a solicitor, a Mr Salt, who advised them to consult the Magistrate and author Henry Fielding. Fielding was 45 years old, and after years of arguments with other Grub Street authors and a lifetime of drink, was approaching the end of his life. Since "taking the sacrament" four years earlier and becoming a Justice of the Peace for Middlesex and Westminster, he had, with "volcanic energy", concerned himself with the activities of criminals. In December 1751 he had published Amelia, a story of a young woman dragged into vice and folly by her abusive husband. Although the book was poorly received, with his experience of criminology Fielding believed he understood the depths to which humans could descend. Thus when Salt divulged the case to him on 6 February Fielding's curiosity was piqued, (Note: Fielding had initially hesitated over the case; suffering from fatigue, he wanted to take a holiday.) and he agreed to take Canning's sworn testimony the next day. Although Fielding was disinclined to believe a simple servant-girl he was impressed with her modesty and genteel manner, and issued a warrant against all the occupants of Wells's house, "that they might appear before me, [and] give Security for their good Behaviour". Virtue Hall and Judith Natus were thus seized, but George Squires, his sisters, and Wells's daughter Sarah Howit, had by then left the house and remained at large.

==== Early press reports ====
The London Daily Advertiser, a Grub Street publication, reported on 10 February:

The house of that notorious woman well known by the name of Mother Wells, between Enfield Wash and Waltham Cross, was immediately suspected; and from many Circumstances appears to be the dismal Prison of the unhappy sufferer, whose melancholy Situation since her miraculous Escape is worthy of Compassion and Charitable contributions of all public-spirited people, and anyone who has any regard for the Safety of their Children and Relations, who are equally liable to the same inhuman and cruel Usage...all these circumstances being duly considered, it is not doubted but a Subscription or Contribution will soon be raised, to enable the Persons who have undertaken to detect this notorious Gang to prosecute their good Intentions with the utmost Vigour, as such a nest of Villains is of the greatest Danger to the Safety of his Majesty's good Subjects.

Meanwhile Canning's supporters were soliciting donations through the Case of Elizabeth Canning, an independently printed pamphlet designed to raise support for the prosecution of her captors. In the Case of, Wells was clearly identified as "that Monster of a Woman", and in an edited version which appeared a week later in the Public Advertiser it was revealed that Canning had suffered a fit after being struck on the head. Squires was called an "old Gypsy Woman", who "robbed the girl of her stays; and then in a miserable naked Condition, because she would not become a common Prostitute, confined her in an old Back Room or loft". (Note: Susannah Wells has variously been described as a madam, although evidence for this is unclear. Treherne (1989) describes Virtue Hall as "the frightened little whore", and a deposition collected by Canning's supporters, in the wake of her trial, reports the story of a labourer named Barrison. He claimed that his daughter asked to stay at Wells's house one night in 1752, but had no money. Wells was reported to have given the girl food and board at no charge, but then introduced her to "a gentleman in a laced waistcoat" who apparently viewed her as a prostitute. The unnamed daughter refused his advances and was locked by Wells in the loft, before she was released the next morning by a passing friend who heard her cries for help. Barrison's account is second-hand, and its veracity is impossible to prove.) Although Squires was often referred to as a gypsy this identification had, on occasion, been called into question. Being named a gypsy could carry certain legal penalties and although these were rarely applied, gypsies were nevertheless treated as pariahs. Moore (1994) described Squires as a "dark, tall, but stooping, elderly woman, with an estimated age ranging from sixty to eighty, sometimes depicted as exceptionally hearty", continuing "all accounts do agree that she was an exceptionally ugly woman, with a very large nose and a lower lip swollen and disfigured by scrofula."

Therefore, for a while, the public were on Canning's side. An 18-year-old servant girl threatened with prostitution and held captive by a gypsy of bad repute, having escaped, emaciated, to return to her loving mother; it was a story that the vast bulk of general public as well as the gentry, found irresistible.

==== Virtue Hall's confession ====
Fielding prided himself upon his fairness—no matter what the social standing of the witness—he subjected Hall to repeated questioning and, frustrated at her contradictory answers, threatened her with imprisonment. This had the desired effect because on 14 February Hall stated that John Squires (son of Mary) and another man had brought Canning to Wells's house early on the morning of 2 January. There, before the two kidnappers, Lucy Squires (Note: Known then as Katherine Squires, and thereafter as Lucy.) and Hall, the old woman had assaulted Canning and forced her upstairs, where she remained until her escape. Hall said that Fortune Natus and his wife Judith had been at the house for some weeks but were moved into the loft to make it appear as though they had stayed there throughout January. Hall's and Canning's evidence now tallied almost perfectly, and Fielding turned to Judith Natus. Although she corroborated Hall's claim that she and her husband had slept in Wells's loft throughout January, Fielding was unconvinced and urged her to reconsider her statement. Although not charged with any crime, Hall meanwhile was committed to the Gatehouse Prison in Westminster, her stay paid for by the Canningites. Fielding left London for a short while before returning to interview Squires, Wells and the others. Wells and Squires denied any knowledge of Canning or her travails, and strongly protested their innocence. This had little credence, due to the long-standing habit of the accused of breaking the law and lying about it.

Mother Wells expressed herself with all the Art and affected Innocence of those wicked Wretches, who are deliberately and methodically taught the methods of evading Justice; and the old Gipsy behaved as a Person traditionally and hereditarily versed in the ancient Egyptian Cunning, making the most religious Protestations of her Innocence; though she was afterwards heard to say, Damn the young Bitch!

— account of Wells's protestations of innocence, 16 February 1753

The story as it had appeared in the London Daily Advertiser had already aroused the public's interest. Fielding had left London believing that he had "ended all the trouble which I thought it necessary for me to give myself in this affair", but on his return he learnt that during his brief absence, amongst others, several "Noble Lords" had attempted to contact him. On 15 February a reward was offered for the capture and conviction of John Squires and his unnamed associate. Also listed were the locations at which donations could be left, "either applied to the carrying on of the Prosecution, or given to the poor Girl as a Recompence [sic] for her Virtue, and Miseries she has gone through". A rather embellished account of the story was later sent to the press. (Note: Perhaps, in the opinion of author Judith Moore, by John Myles—who had replaced Salt as the Canningites' legal advisor.) George Squires could not be found.

=== Trial of Squires and Wells ===
Squires, charged with assault and theft, and Wells, with "well-knowing" what her accomplice had done, were tried on 21 February at the Session House of the Old Bailey. The Lord Mayor of London Sir Crisp Gascoyne presided over the court with a panel of other justices, including Martin Wright (Justice of the King's Bench), Nathaniel Gundry (Justice of the Common Pleas), Richard Adams (Baron of the Exchequer since 1753; formerly Recorder of London), and William Moreton (appointed Recorder of London in 1753). The gallery was packed with interested spectators. (Note: Proceedings were written down by Thomas Gurney, although the names of counsel for defence or prosecution are not known.) The charge of theft was extremely serious; the value of Canning's stays (about 10 shillings) meant that if she was found guilty, Squires would almost certainly be hanged at the Tyburn Tree.

As she arrived at the court Canning was cheered by the large crowd gathered outside the building. Inside, she testified that she was taken by two men "to the prisoner Wells's house" at about 4 a.m. on the morning of 2 January. In the kitchen, the old woman (Squires) was sat in a chair and asked her "if I chose to go their way". Canning's refusal had prompted Squires to cut off her stays, slap her face, and push her up the stairs into a darkened room. She told the court she "saw nothing brought up[, but w]hen day-light appeared, I could see about the room; there was a fire-place and a grate in it, no bed nor bedstead, nothing but hay to lie upon; there was a black pitcher not quite full of water, and about twenty-four pieces of bread ... about a quartern loaf". She claimed to have escaped by removing a board from a window at the north end of the loft, climbing out, and jumping down to the soft clay below. She fled along a lane behind the house, through some fields, and on finding a road set out for London. When asked if she had seen or spoken to anyone on the way back, she replied that she had not, explaining that she had shied away from contact for fear of meeting somebody from the house she had escaped from. Canning was cross-examined by William Davy, who questioned her recollection of events in the house. Asked why she had not attempted escape earlier she replied: "Because I thought they might let me out; it never came into my head till that [Monday] morning." Squires, who had been quietly muttering to herself in the dock, shouted "I never saw that witness in my lifetime till this day three weeks".

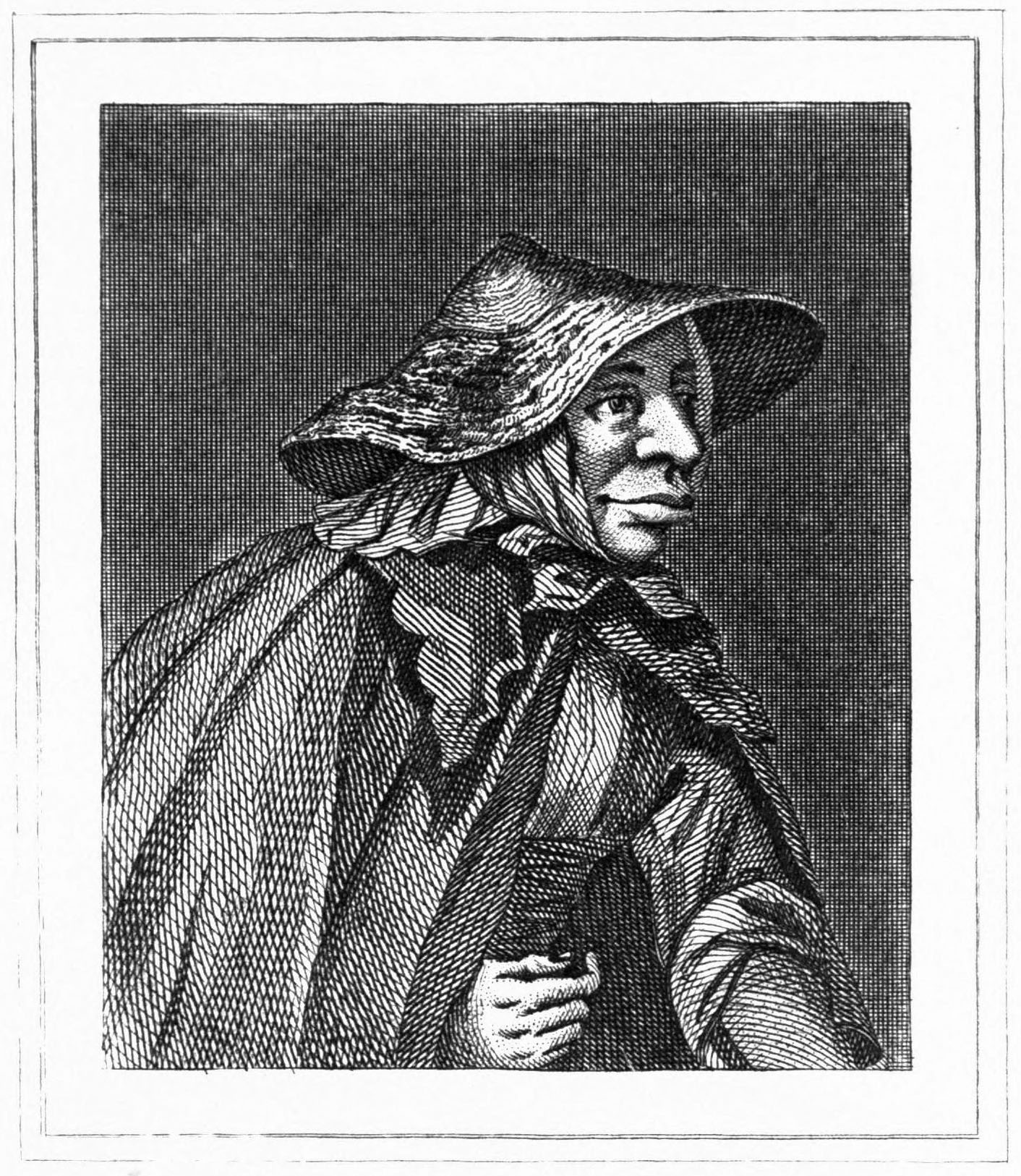
A 19th-century portrait of Mary Squires, as printed in The Newgate Calendar

Next to appear on the stand was Virtue Hall, who recounted much of her earlier statement to Fielding. Squires again interrupted, asking "What day was it that the young woman was robbed?" The answer came back, from the court: "She says on the morning of the 2nd of January", and Squires replied "I return thanks for telling me, for I am as innocent as the child unborn". Susannah Wells used the opportunity to ask how long Squires and her family were supposed to have been at the house, and was answered by Hall "They were there six or seven weeks in all; they had been there about a fortnight before the young woman was brought in". Amongst others, Thomas Colley and Mrs Canning also gave testimony. Canning's former employer, John Wintlebury, told the court how he had deduced that it was Wells's house where Canning had been held. Mary Myers and James Lord also claimed to have heard Canning say "Wills or Wells", as did Robert Scarrat, a hartshorn-rasper and previously a servant in nearby Edmonton who had visited Wells's house on previous occasions.

Although both were subpoenaed as witnesses neither Fortune nor Judith Natus were called to the stand, the attorney responsible later explaining that the mob outside may have intimidated several witnesses. Susannah Wells's neighbours were turned away by the mob and her daughter and half-brother were quickly recognised and stopped. However, three witnesses found in Dorset by George Squires, to testify for his mother, passed by unrecognised. The first, John Gibbons, said that the Squires had visited his house in Abbotsbury "with handkerchiefs, lawns, muslins, and checks, to sell about town" from 1–9 January. This was corroborated by his neighbour, William Clarke. Squires's last witness, Thomas Greville, claimed that he had accommodated Mary and "her sister and her brother" under his roof in Coombe, on 14 January, where they sold "handkerchiefs, lawns, and such things". This was contradicted by John Iniser, a fishmonger around Waltham Cross and Theobalds. Insier claimed he knew Squires by sight and that in the three weeks before her arrest he had seen her telling fortunes in the neighbourhood of Wells's house. Wells, whose witnesses had been unable to pass by the mob outside, was able to offer only two sentences in her defence. She told the court that she had not seen Canning before 1 February, and that "as to Squires, I never saw her above a week and a day before we were taken up." According to a contemporary report in the London Daily Advertiser, as the three witnesses left the court the mob, waiting in the yard, "beat them, kicked them rolled them in the Kennel and otherwise misused them before they suffered them to get from them".

==== Verdict ====
Character witnesses in 18th-century English trials were, according to author Douglas Hay, "extremely important, and very frequently used ... in character testimony too, the word of a man of property had the greatest weight. Judges respected the evidence of employers, farmers and neighbouring gentlemen, not mere neighbours and friends." The jury were apparently unimpressed by the defence's case and pronounced both defendants guilty. They were sentenced on 26 February; Wells would be branded in her hand and spend six months in prison. For stealing Canning's stays, Squires was to be hanged. By March 1753 pamphlets on Canning's story were being read in the coffee-houses of London. There was widespread outrage over Squires' treatment of her, exacerbated when Little Jemmy, "a poor man who cries sticks about the streets" was supposedly robbed and then stamped on by five gypsies. Canning was celebrated by the mob and gentry, several of whom contributed to her purse, enabling her to move to better accommodation in the house of a Mr Marshall, a cheesemonger in Aldermanbury.

==== Gascoyne's investigation ====
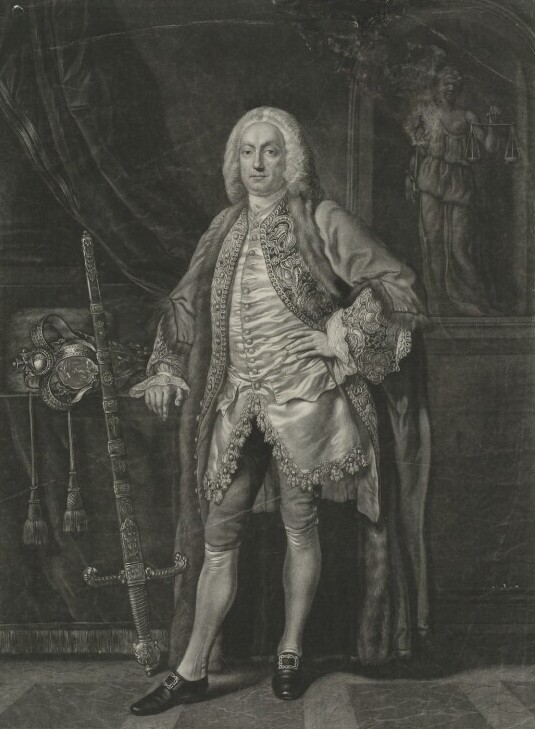
Sir Crisp Gascoyne was convinced that a miscarriage of justice had occurred.

Not everybody was satisfied with the verdict. The trial judge Sir Crisp Gascoyne and some of his colleagues on the bench found Canning's story extremely unlikely. Gascoyne had been disgusted by Canning's supporters, who while outside the court had prevented witnesses from giving evidence, and he was particularly sympathetic to Mary Squires, whom he named "the poor creature". (Note: He later asserted that other members of the bench had shared his concerns.) Then 52 years old, Gascoyne had started life as a Houndsditch brewer before he married the daughter of a wealthy physician. He had progressed through the ranks to become Master of the Brewer's Company, then served as Alderman of Vintry Ward, Sheriff of London, and been knighted after presenting an address to the king. He had argued on behalf of the city's orphans and was known for his benevolence in Essex, where he owned large estates.

Gascoyne at once began a private enquiry and wrote to the Anglican minister at Abbotsville, James Harris. He thought it unlikely that the three witnesses found by George Squires would travel so far "to foreswear themselves on behalf of this miserable object" and Harris did not disappoint. The Reverend was able to corroborate Gibbons's testimony and offer new witnesses who could claim to have seen Squires well away from Enfield Wash. Gascoyne also thought that some of the Canningites doubted the girl's veracity and had colluded in her version of events to spite him; this, he thought, was a political attack on a public official and he refused to let the matter rest. He justified his activities by comparing his apparent compassion for the victim, Mary Squires, with his outrage for the deceit of her accuser, Elizabeth Canning, but his fervour was influenced in part by the attitudes of the time. He considered the behaviour of the Canningites inappropriate for their low station and was more impressed by the assurances of people such as Alderman Chitty and Reverend Harris, who as gentlemen and public advocates were presumed more reliable.

Gascoyne's colleague on the bench, Mr Justice Gundry, had written to the Undersheriff of Dorset, who knew John Gibbons and William Clarke. The Undersheriff wrote back claiming that they "would not have given evidence had it not been true". Clarke may have been in a relationship with Lucy Squires, and claimed that he had stayed with the Squires in Ridgeway. Fifteen prominent residents of Abbotsbury, including churchwardens, Overseers of the Poor, a schoolmaster and a tithing man swore that the Squires were in Dorset in January and that their witnesses were trustworthy men. A further six Abbotsbury men walked 20 miles (32 km) to sign an affidavit corroborating their neighbours' evidence.

Fielding and Gascoyne had each issued contradictory pamphlets on the case, but it was Virtue Hall's testimony, fundamental in the prosecution of Squires and Wells, which became central to Gascoyne's investigation. Hall had given her testimony to Fielding under threat of imprisonment and when by chance the Grub Street writer John Hill heard from a Magistrate that she had shown signs of remorse, he was presented with a perfect opportunity to settle an old score. A prodigious writer and author of a renowned newspaper column, The Inspector, Hill had squabbled with several of his peers, notably so in Fielding's case, as Fielding had closed that argument in his Covent Garden Journal by stating that "this hill was only a paltry dunghill, and had long before been levelled with the dirt."

Supported by the Canningites, Hall was by then staying at the Gatehouse Prison, although still not charged with any crime. Hill immediately communicated his concerns to Gascoyne, who sent for the young woman. Accompanied by a contingent of Canningites, her answers were at first noncommittal, but once isolated from Canning's friends she soon admitted to Gascoyne that she had perjured herself. She was committed to the Poultry Compter, where the Canningites continued to support her until they learnt that "particular persons only" were allowed to visit. Hall was again questioned on 7 March, by both Gascoyne and Canning's supporters. When asked why she had lied to the court, she said "when I was at Mr Fielding's I at first spoke the truth, but was told it was not the truth. I was terrified and threatened to be sent to Newgate, and prosecuted as a felon, unless I should speak the truth." She was asked by one of her supporters if she was still lying, but her replies were deemed inconclusive and having confessed to and denied most of the things about which she was questioned, each side began to see her as a liability.

=== Perjury ===
Reverend Harris had several of his witnesses sent to London, where they were interviewed by Gascoyne. In Newgate Prison on 9 March, Gascoyne also interviewed Susannah Wells, who confirmed Hall's new version of events. He then performed several interviews from 12 to 13 March, including Fortune and Judith Natus, and a witness who could cast doubt on John Iniser's testimony. Gascoyne also asked George and Lucy Squires about their travels early in 1753; George was unable to recall all the places they had visited, and so Gascoyne sent him to Dorset to help him remember. Gascoyne then met with Elizabeth Long (Wells's daughter), who had been prevented by the mob from testifying for her mother, and on 23 March three of Canning's former witnesses expressed to Gascoyne their doubts about the young maid's story. Another witness, who swore that Squires had been in Abbotsbury in January, was interviewed two days later. Gascoyne instructed him to visit Squires in Newgate, where the two recognised one another immediately.

Meanwhile, John Myles, who had replaced Salt and who now led the Canningites, had been gathering witnesses who could claim they had seen Mary Squires in the vicinity of Enfield Wash. One said he had seen two men dragging a woman towards Enfield early in January. Others told him they had on 29 January seen "a miserable poor wretch" travelling toward London. Myles found witnesses who claimed they had seen Squires at Enfield Wash in December and January. Myles unwittingly made Gascoyne aware of his investigation when he asked a John Cooper of Salisbury his opinion of seven of Gascoyne's witnesses, who claimed they had seen Squires in Coombe. Cooper wrote back affirming the good character of Thomas Greville (who had testified for Squires at her trial), but later sent the same information to Gascoyne, offering his support.

At this point it appeared certain to Gascoyne that Canning had not told the truth. Through January, he thought, the Squireses had very likely been travelling through Dorset, Hampshire, and then London, and had not been in Enfield Wash to kidnap Canning. On 13 March, he therefore ordered Canning arrested, for perjury.

==== Public spats ====
Gascoyne's investigation caused a press frenzy. The output of the writers and publishers of Grub Street emboldened opinions about the case, and in some instances reinforced long-held stereotypes of "wicked Gypsies and a poor innocent girl refusing to yield her honour". The Canningites stirred up anti-gypsy sentiment with a range of pamphlets and advertisements, one of which named the now deeply unpopular Gascoyne "the King of the Gipsies". Reports began to emerge, of sinister goings-on; one such claimed that several men on horseback threatened that "they would burn all the people's houses, barns and corn thereabouts", should Squires be hanged.

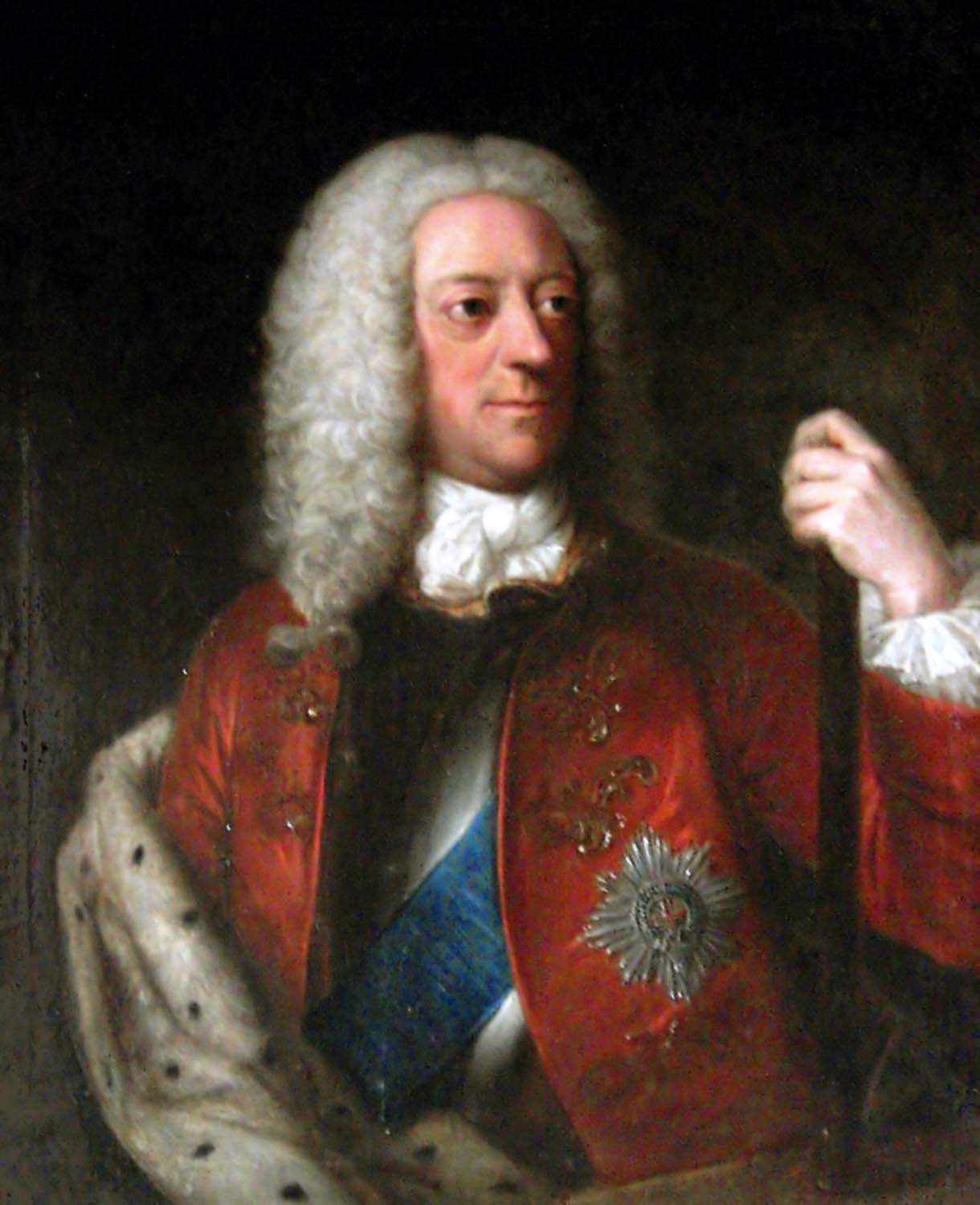
George II issued a stay of execution on Squires's sentence, and later a pardon.

Canning's honesty (or lack of it) and Fielding's handling of the case were raised in a deeply critical attack printed by The London Daily Advertiser. On the same day that Gascoyne ordered Canning's arrest an advertisement appeared in the Public Advertiser, asking its readers "to suspend their judgement in the Case of the Gypsy Woman till a full State of the whole, which is now being prepared by Mr. Fielding, is published." Fielding had learnt of Hall's questioning by Gascoyne and had brought Canning to his house in Bow Street, to "sift the truth out of her, and to bring her to confession if she was guilty." Satisfied with her account, and unconcerned with Hall, his critique of Squires' supporters was published as A Clear Statement of the Case of Elizabeth Canning, in which he espoused the virtuous nature of the young maid and attacked those of her detractors. Copies sold so quickly that a second print run was ordered two days later. John Hill saw A Clear Statement as a direct attack on Gascoyne, and blasted Fielding with The Story of Elizabeth Canning Considered, which ridiculed his enemy with such comments as: "Who Sir, are you, that are thus dictating unto the Government? Retire into yourself and know your station." Fielding, however, played little part in the saga from thereon, believing that Canning's supporters had begun to see him as an obstacle to their case.

About half of those condemned to death during the 18th century went not to the gallows, but to prison, or colonies abroad. Although pardons were not common, it was possible to bypass the judge and petition the king directly, and although Gascoyne had some concerns about the character of the witnesses upon whom he was able to call, he nevertheless wrote to George II to request that Squires be pardoned. On 10 April 1753 therefore the king granted a stay of execution of six weeks, while new evidence on both sides of the case was sent to the Lord Chancellor Lord Hardwicke and the Attorney and Solicitor-General. Squires would receive her pardon on 30 May 1753, but Wells was less fortunate; she served her sentence and was released from Newgate on 21 August.

==== Trial of the Abbotsbury men ====
While Squires's eventual pardon was being deliberated upon, Myles was busy building Canning's defence. He was far from complacent; on 20 April he was in Dorchester with a warrant for the arrest of Gibbons, Clark and Greville, the three Abbotsbury men who had testified for Squires. With a small armed party he captured Gibbons and Clarke at the local inn and took them back to Dorchester, but his warrant was incorrectly worded and Gibbons was released by the justice. Clarke was taken to London and interrogated by Myles at his house, for two days, but the cordwainer refused to cooperate. He was granted bail and returned to Abbotsbury.

The three were charged with "wilful corrupt perjury" and tried on 6 September 1753 at the Old Bailey. As Lord Mayor, and fearing accusations of bias, Gascoyne recused himself from the case. The defendants were represented by William Davy, who had earlier defended Squires and Wells. Over 100 people were present to testify on their behalf, but the Canningites stayed away; they were unaware of Gascoyne's withdrawal and feared an embarrassing release of evidence to the public from an appearance by Canning. They also kept their witnesses away; with the exception of one of Mrs Canning's neighbours, none were present. Myles had not been paid by his employers, and to delay proceedings, his brother Thomas sent a clerk to deliver to the court a selection of writs, but nevertheless Gibbons, Clark, and Greville were found not guilty, and released.

At this point Canning had not been seen publicly for some time, and she was proclaimed an outlaw. When in November 1753 a new Lord Mayor was installed she remained out of sight, but at the February Sessions in 1754 she reappeared at the Old Bailey and presented herself to the authorities.

==== Canning's trial ====
Gentlemen, the prisoner stands indicted of one of the most heinous crimes; an endeavour, by wilful and corrupt foreswearing herself, to take away the life of a guiltless person; and with aggravation, in the black catalogue of offences, I know not one of a deeper dye. It is a perversion of the laws of her country to the worst of purposes; it is wrestling the sword out of the hands of justice to shed innocent blood.

— Edward Willes, extract of opening statement

Canning's trial began at the Old Bailey on Monday 29 April 1754, continuing on Wednesday 1 May, 3–4 May, 6–7 May and ending on 8 May—an unusually long trial for the time. During jury selection the defence objected to three potential jurors (much less than the Crown's 17 objections) but were too late to argue the choice of foreman, who, it was claimed, had publicly called Canning "a LYING B——H, a CHEAT, or an IMPOSTER". Presiding over the courtroom was the new Lord Mayor, Thomas Rawlinson (Crisp Gascoyne's successor Edward Ironside having died in office in November 1753), with Edward Clive (Justice of the Common Pleas), Heneage Legge (Baron of the Exchequer), William Moreton (Recorder of London), and Samuel Fludyer, alderman. Canning was represented by three attorneys, George Nares, John Morton and a Mr Williams. Prosecuting was Gascoyne's son Bamber, Edward Willes and William Davy. After her indictment was read by the Clerk of Arraigns the story of Canning's supposed abduction and imprisonment was retold by Bamber Gascoyne. Then Davy spoke at length. He attacked Canning's story and told how Squires and her family had travelled through England with smuggled goods to sell. He offered new evidence to support Squires' alibi and rubbished Canning's description of her prison, before questioning her account of her escape. He concluded with Virtue Hall's recantation of her earlier testimony. Willes was the next to speak, picking over the discrepancies between the various accounts offered by Canning of her disappearance.

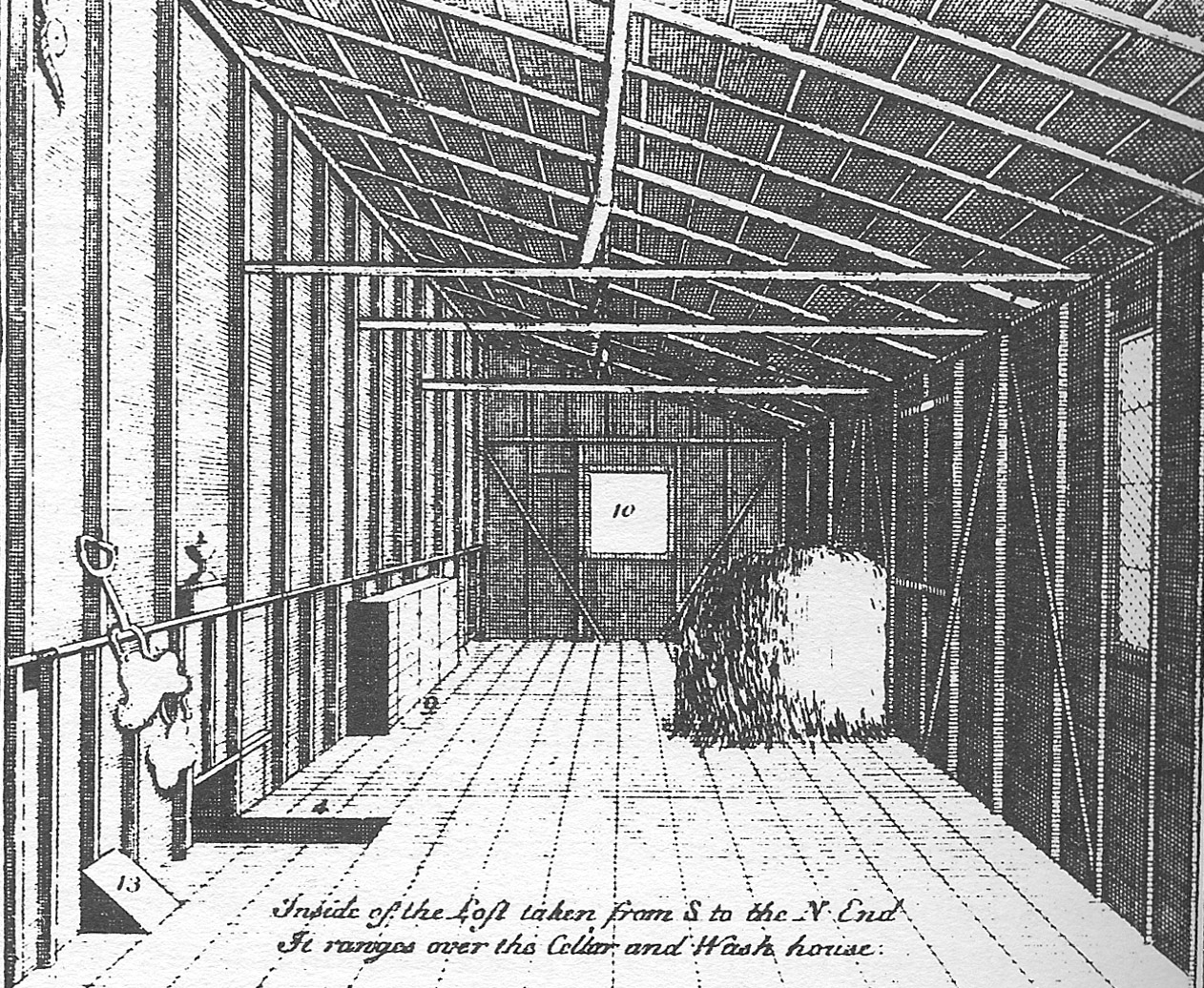
A contemporary sketch of the loft in which it was supposed Canning was held

Canning's defence began with opening statements from Williams and Morton. The latter emphasised her misfortune at twice being subjected to such anguish, firstly for prosecuting her assailants and secondly for being punished for doing so. He complimented the jury and poured scorn on Davy's allegations, and seized upon the prosecution's unwillingness to call Virtue Hall to the stand. Morton highlighted how unlikely it was that Canning could so profoundly fool her supporters and countered the prosecution's complaint about Canning's description of the loft. The third attorney, George Nares, concentrated on the societal problems of prosecuting Canning for perjury, implying that other victims of crime would be less likely to pursue their assailants, for fear of being prosecuted themselves.

Morton questioned George Squires, who could not recall with absolute certainty the path he claimed his family took through the south of England while Canning was missing. His sister Lucy was not called to the stand, as she was considered "rather more stupid than her brother, and has not been on the road since their coming to Enfield Wash". Robert Willis, who had accompanied Squires to retrace the gypsy family's steps, was also called to testify; his evidence was judged as hearsay and ruled inadmissible. As in the trial of Squires and Wells, the reliability of the prosecutor's witnesses was considered dependent upon their character. Three men from Litton Cheney testified that they had seen the Squires family enter the village on 30 December. The three Abbotsbury men then stepped up and gave their evidence. 39 witnesses for the prosecution were heard on the first day alone; most of them establishing briefly the Squires family's alibi.

Several persons were taken into custody that made a riot at the Old Bailey Gate and were committed to Newgate. William Moreton Esq recorder, recommended to all persons who were concerned in the most pathetic manner, to consider the dignity of the Court of Justice, the necessity of keeping up that dignity, and that the magistracy of this court should not be treated in such a manner as to lessen the weight of the Civil Power. After the court adjourned there was so great a mob at the gate of the Session-House threatening Sir Crisp Gascoyne, that Mr. Sheriff Chitty, with a number of Constables, escorted him as far as the Royal-Exchange.

— Whitehall Evening Post or London Intelligencer, Tuesday 30 April 1754

At the end of the first day's proceedings the mob outside, expecting a short trial and a not guilty verdict, were presented not with the young maid but rather with Crisp Gascoyne. Infuriated, they threw dirt and stones at him, forcing him to retreat to a nearby inn, before returning to the court to escort Canning away from the building. On 1 May therefore the trial continued not with a resumption of the first day's examination, but with concern over the attack on Gascoyne. A guard was found to protect him and the jury, a member of Canning's defence was forced to apologise, and the Canningites later that day printed a notice appealing to the crowd to not interfere. Alderman Thomas Chitty was sworn in and, guided by Bamber Gascoyne, gave his account of his first meeting with Canning on 31 January 1753. Davy questioned several witnesses, who described the discrepancies in Canning's account of her prison. One of them told of his disgust at Virtue Hall's testimony against Squires. Along with several other witnesses including Sarah Howit, Fortune and Judith Natus testified that Canning had never been in the loft before 1 February and that it was in fact Howit and Virtue Hall who had been in the loft in January. (Note: Howit and Hall apparently conversed with gardeners outside the house during this time. These men are some of the "several other witnesses" but their names are excluded from the text for brevity.) The end of the day's proceedings was again overshadowed by the mob outside, and Gascoyne was accorded an escort of "a Body of Constables".

Friday saw yet more witnesses for the prosecution, bringing the total brought by Davy to about 60. The defence questioned several of those present at the original search of Wells's house. Canning's uncle, Thomas Colley, was cross-examined about what his niece ate on her visit of New Year's Day, the prosecution apparently seeking to establish whether or not she could have been sustained for a month by the bread she claimed to have been given. On the third day of the trial, Mrs Canning was brought to the stand. One possible line of defence for her daughter was simply that she was too stupid to have ever invented the tale, but under cross-examination by Davy Mrs Canning demonstrated that her daughter was capable of writing "a little". This, in Davy's view, was sufficient to demonstrate that she was certainly no imbecile. Scarrat was questioned next, and admitted that he had been to Wells's house before Canning had disappeared. Two of Canning's neighbours testified to her "deplorable condition". Her employer was questioned, as was her apothecary, who thought that Canning would have been quite able to survive on the pitcher of water and crusts of bread she claimed to have been given. The defence responded with three witnesses, who each believed that they had encountered a "poor, miserable wretch" at the end of January, when she claimed to have escaped.

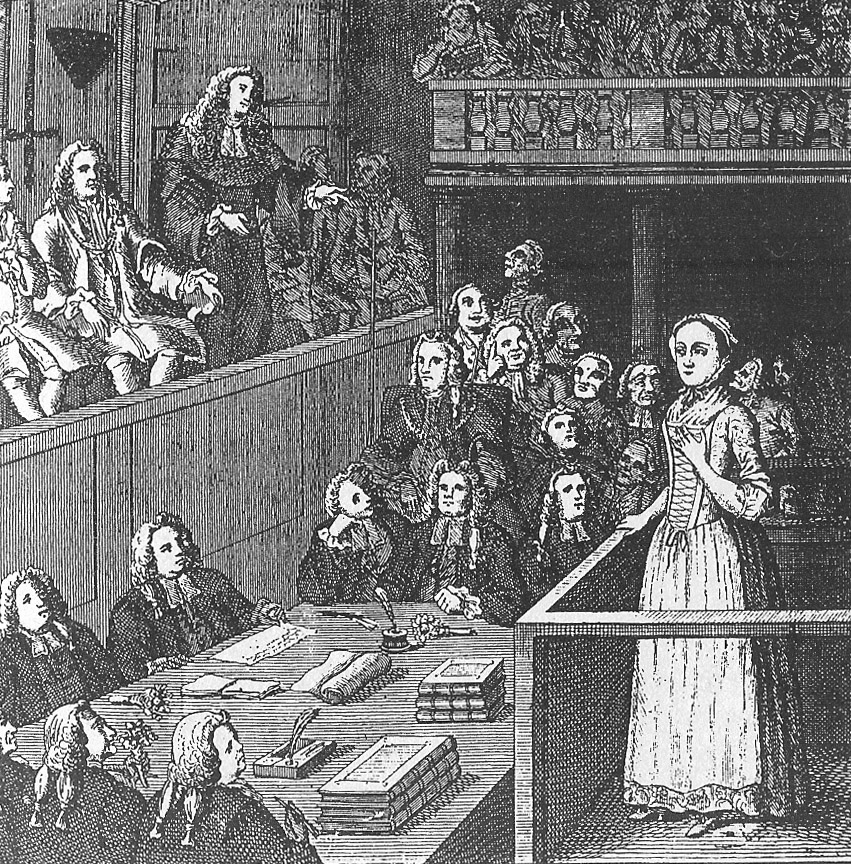
The Trial of Elizabeth Canning

On 6 May more witnesses for the prosecution were called. As Squires and her family watched, several of Wells's neighbours insisted they had, about the beginning of 1753, seen the old gypsy in the area. More witnesses claimed to have seen her in various places around Enfield Wash, including one woman who swore she had seen her on Old Christmas Day. Britain's calendar had in September 1752 changed from the old-style Julian calendar, to the Gregorian calendar, and the woman was unable to discern the exact day on which she claimed to have seen Squires. She was not alone; several of the defence's witnesses were also unable to manage the 11-day correction required by the calendar change. Others were illiterate, and struggled similarly. The court also heard from three witnesses present solely to discredit the testimony offered by the Natuses.

The final day's proceedings were taken up by Davy, who produced more prosecution witnesses, and proceeded to pick apart the testimony of those who claimed to have seen Squires in Enfield Wash, in January. He summarised the prosecution's case by telling the jury that Canning was guilty of "the most impious and detestable [crime] the human heart can conceive". The recorder, William Moreton, stated the defence's case, and asked the jury to consider if they thought that Canning had answered the charges against her to their satisfaction, and if it was possible she could have survived for almost a month on "no more than a quartern-loaf, and a pitcher of water".

=== Verdict, repercussions, later life ===
The jury took almost two hours to find Canning "Guilty of perjury, but not wilful and corrupt." The recorder refused to accept the verdict as it was partial, and the jury then took a further 20 minutes to find her "Guilty of Wilful and Corrupt Perjury." Crisp Gascoyne was not present when the verdict was delivered; he had been advised to leave earlier, to avoid any trouble outside the court. The defence tried unsuccessfully for a retrial. Canning, held at Newgate prison, was sentenced on 30 May. By a majority of nine to eight, she was given a month's imprisonment, to be followed by seven years' transportation. According to the State Trials, Canning spoke, and "hoped they would be favourable to her; that she had no intent of swearing the gypsey's life away; and that what had been done, was only defending herself; and desired to be considered unfortunate".

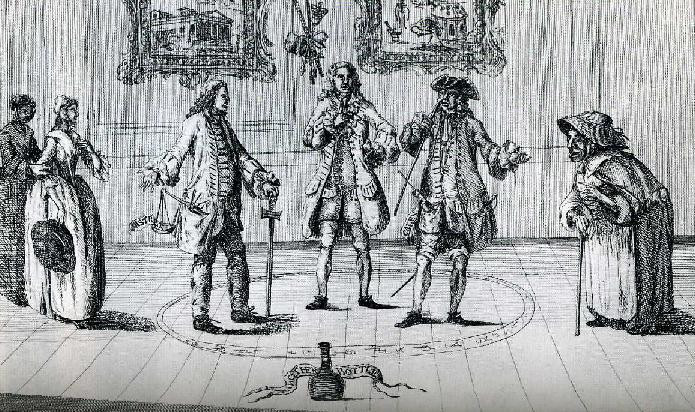
The Conjurers (1753). Canning, Fielding, Gascoyne, Hill, and Squires, share the stage with The Bottle Conjuror.

The verdict did nothing to assuage the ferocity of the debate. Transcripts of the trial were extremely popular, and portraits of the implacable young maid were offered for sale from shop windows. A reward was offered for information on anyone who had attacked Gascoyne, but mainly the Grub Street press concerned itself with the fallout from the affair. The Gazeteer was filled with satirical letters between such authors as Aristarchus, Tacitus, and T. Trueman, Esq. One such, a Canningite called Nikodemus, complained that without gypsies, "what would become of your young nobility and gentry, if there were no bawds to procure young girls of pleasure for them?" Those on Squires's side were not the only ones to come under such attacks; John Hill wrote a short song celebrating his and Gascoyne's role in the affair, and pictures of Canning in the loft, her bodice loosened to reveal her bosom, were readily available. Another showed Wells and Squires held aloft by a broomstick, an obvious allusion to witchcraft.

Gascoyne had stood for Parliament during Canning's trial, but came bottom of the poll. To justify his pursuit of Canning, he wrote An Address to the Liverymen of the City of London, from Sir Crisp Gascoyne, and suffered not only literary but physical attacks, as well as death threats. The Canningites published several responses to Gascoyne's thoughts, including A liveryman's reply to Sir Crisp Gascoyne's address, and A refutation of Sir Crisp Gascoyne's of his conduct in the cases of Elizabeth Canning and Mary Squires, the latter presenting the trial as the culmination of a Gascoyne vendetta against Canning.

Canning, held at Newgate, was reported to be in the presence of Methodists, an unfortunate accusation for her side. On the same day this report appeared, handbills were circulated asserting that the Rector of St Mary Magdalen had visited her and was satisfied that she was still a member of the Church of England. Among her visitors was Mr Justice Ledinard, who had helped deliver Virtue Hall to Gascoyne. Ledinard asked Canning to confess but was told by Canning that "I have said the whole truth in court, and nothing but the truth; and I don't choose to answer any questions, unless it be in court again." Despite calls for clemency, she was taken to the convict ship Tryal for her voyage to British America. Several threats made by the ship's crew, however, meant she eventually sailed on board the Myrtilla in August 1754. Canning arrived in Wethersfield, Connecticut, and by arrangement with her supporters went to live with the Methodist Reverend Elisha Williams. She was not employed as a servant, but was taken in as a member of Williams's family. Williams died in 1755, and Canning married John Treat (a distant relation of the former governor Robert Treat) on 24 November 1756, had a son (Joseph Canning Treat) in June 1758, and a daughter (Elizabeth) in November 1761. She had two more sons (John and Salmon), but died suddenly in June 1773.

== Views and theories ==
It is not an artful, but on the contrary, an exceeding stupid story. An artful story, is such a story as Tom Jones, where the incidents are so various, and yet so consistent with themselves, and with nature, that the more the reader is acquainted with nature, the more he is deceived into a belief of its being true; and is with difficulty recall'd from that belief by the author's confession from time to time of its being all a fiction. But what is there plausible in the adventures of Enfield Wash? What is there strange or poetically fancied in the incidents of robbing, knocking down—cry'd out murder—stopt my mouth with a handkerchief—you bitch, why don't you go faster?—carrying to a bawdy house—offer of fine cloaths—cut your throat if you stir? Such is the variety of these incidents, which owe all their strangeness to the senseless manner in which they have been, with respect to time and place, jumbled together.
There is nothing surprising in such stories, except their meeting with any degree of belief; and that surprise commonly ceases, whenever we set ourselves coolly to examine into their origin, and trace them to their fountain head.

— Allan Ramsay (1762)

For Georgian Britain, the story of Elizabeth Canning was fascinating. Little attention was paid in the trial to Squires's request for Canning to "go their way"; according to Moore (1994), overtly the saga questioned Canning's chastity, while covertly it questioned whether someone of her social standing had any right to be taken notice of. The author Kristina Straub compares the case with the more general debate over the sexuality of female servants; Canning may have been either a "childlike innocent, victimized by brutally criminal outlaws", or "a wily manipulator of the justice system who uses innocent bystanders to escape the consequences of her own sexual misdeeds". The Case of Elizabeth Canning Fairly Stated posited that Canning either suffered imprisonment to protect her virtue, or lied to conceal "her own criminal Transactions in the Dark". Straub opines that the debate was not merely about Canning's guilt or innocence, but rather "the kinds of sexual identity that were attributable to women of her position in the social order."

The partisan nature of the Canningites and the Egyptians ensured that the trial of Elizabeth Canning became one of the most notorious criminal mysteries in 18th-century English law. For years the case was a regular feature in such publications as The Newgate Calendar and the Malefactor's Registers. Artist Allan Ramsay wrote A Letter to the Right Honourable the Earl of — Concerning the Affair of Elizabeth Canning, which was the inspiration for Voltaire's Histoire d'Elisabeth Canning, et de Jean Calas (1762), who shared Ramsay's opinion that Canning had gone missing to hide a pregnancy. The case was revisited in 1820 by James Caulfield, who retold the story but with several glaring mistakes. (Note: One such mistake Caulfield made was in claiming that Canning became a teacher, and married a Quaker.) Throughout the 19th and 20th centuries several authors offered their own interpretations of the case. Caulfield's essay was followed in 1852 by John Paget's Elizabeth Canning. Paget's apt summary of the case read: "in truth, perhaps, the most complete and most inexplicable Judicial Puzzle on record".

Canning's trial was marked by the prosecution's inability to find any evidence whatsoever that she had been anywhere but in Wells's home, and where Canning was in January 1753 remains unknown. Similarly, mystery surrounds the precise movements of the Squires family, when it was supposed they were travelling through Dorset early in 1753. The writer F. J. Harvey Darton suspected that the family were smugglers, and that it was significant they had passed through Eggardon, where Isaac Gulliver operated (although Gulliver was, at the time, a child). The 18th-century artist Allan Ramsay claimed that Canning's initial story was "exceedingly stupid", and false. He viewed the lack of detail in her testimony as unsurprising to a more analytical mind. The US author Lillian Bueno McCue theorised that she was an amnesiac, and that her former employer, John Wintlebury, was to blame for her imprisonment at the Wells house. John Treherne (1989) considers this theory very unlikely however, and instead concludes that Canning was almost certainly at Enfield Wash, but was not kept prisoner at Wells's home. He suggests that Robert Scarrat implanted the suggestion that Canning had been held at the Wells's house, as a useful decoy, and that he had somehow been involved in an unwanted pregnancy. Treherne also suggests that Canning was suffering from partial amnesia, and that she may not have lied intentionally at the trial of Squires and Wells. He calls Canning "the first media product." Although some early authors adopted the same stance as Fielding or Hill, who actively took sides in the affair, most later writers believe that Canning did not tell the truth. Moore (1994), however, believes that Canning was probably innocent. Moore explains discrepancies between Canning and the Squires' testimonies as understandable omissions and modifications, and placing much emphasis on the ability of those men in power to follow their own pursuits—often at the expense of others.

== See also ==
- Josephine Tey's The Franchise Affair (1948), based on the Canning case, and set in a modern garb. Tey regarded the whole story as a tissue of lies from start to end, and her book reflects this.
- List of kidnappings before 1900
- List of solved missing person cases (pre-1950)
