= Enfield Wash =

Coordinates: 51.6688°N 0.0396°W

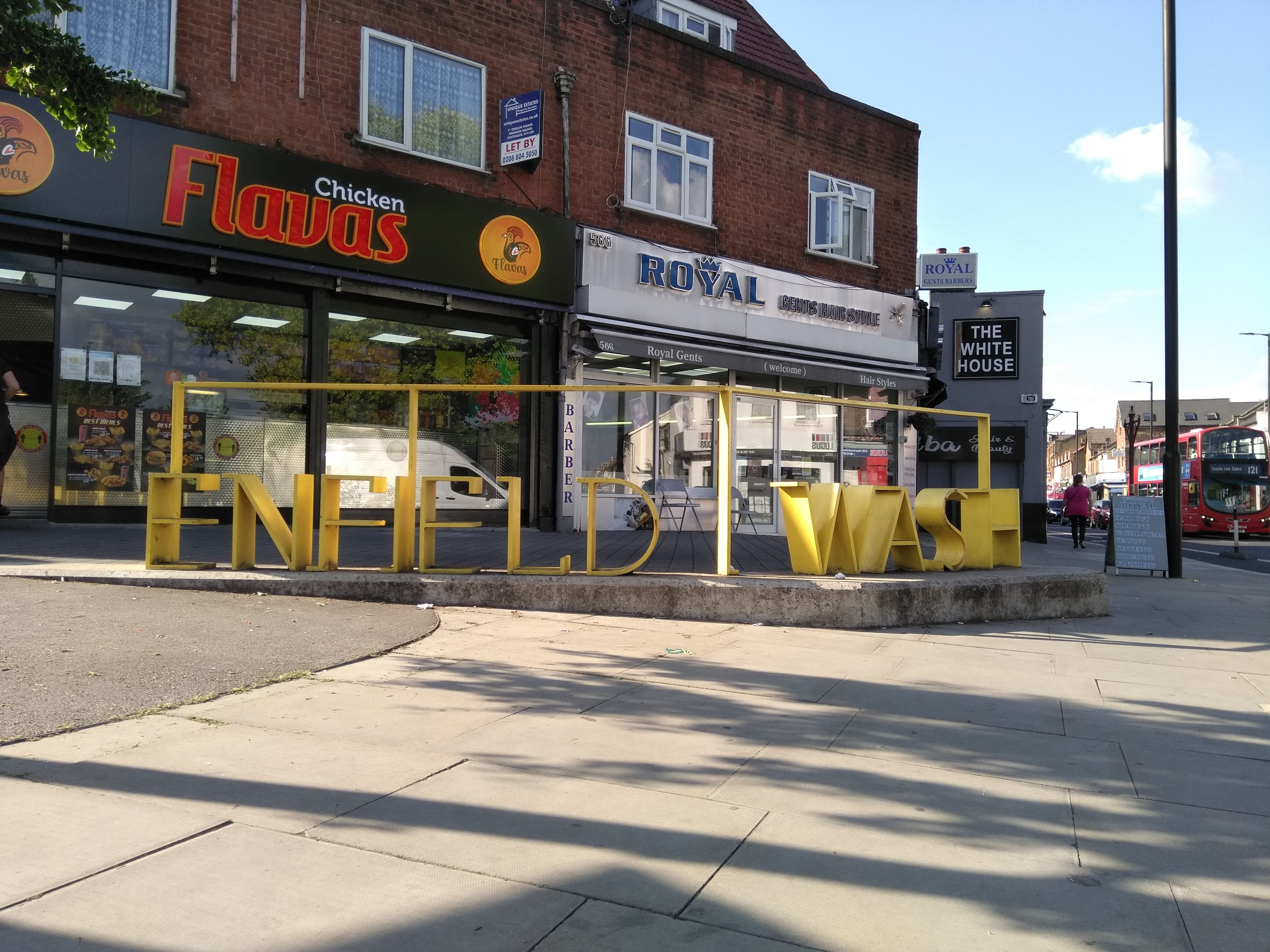
- Enfield Wash sign in Hertford Road

- Location within Greater London
- OS grid reference: TQ355985
- London borough: Enfield
- Ceremonial county: Greater London
- Region: London
- Country: England
- Sovereign state: United Kingdom
- Post town: ENFIELD
- Postcode district: EN3
- Dialling code: 020
- Police: Metropolitan
- Fire: London
- Ambulance: London
- UK Parliament: Enfield North
- London Assembly: Enfield and Haringey

Enfield Wash is an area in the London Borough of Enfield, North London. It is approximately located in the area either side of Hertford Road between Ordnance Road/Turkey Street and Bell Lane/Hoe Lane.

== History ==
Enfield Wash was where Elizabeth Canning (later married name Treat; 17 September 1734 – June 1773), an English maidservant claimed to have been kidnapped, held in a hayloft for almost a month and threatened with prostitution. These events became one of the most celebrated English criminal mysteries of the 18th century, and a cause célèbre at the time. Magistrate and author Henry Fielding was consulted on the matter. Mother Well's house was opposite the Sun and Woolpack public house, formerly the Sun and Punchbowl. The United society, the first friendly society, began to meet in the Sun and Woolpack inn, Enfield Wash, in 1794.

The road crosses Turkey Brook at the Woolpack Bridge, where there was a footbridge from the 17th century, but it was not until 1821 that a proper bridge for carts was provided by the Turnpike Trust that managed Enfield Highway. The road at Enfield Wash, and the settlement, was known as '‘Horsepoolstones’ until the 18th century. Turkey Brook was also known as Maiden Brook and sometimes Wash Brook.

According to legend, Bell Lane is haunted by a phantom coach. It is reputed to appear on moonless nights before Christmas, and to travel several feet above the road.

== Etymology ==
Enfield Wash was first recorded in 1675 and on the Ordnance Survey map of 1822, from Old English (ga)wæsc 'a place that floods': historically there was probably a ford here where Ermine Street crossed Turkey Brook.

== Transport and locale ==
=== Nearest places ===
- Enfield Lock
- Enfield Highway
- Freezywater
- Bulls Cross

=== Nearest railway stations ===
- Enfield Lock railway station
- Turkey Street railway station

== Parks and open spaces ==
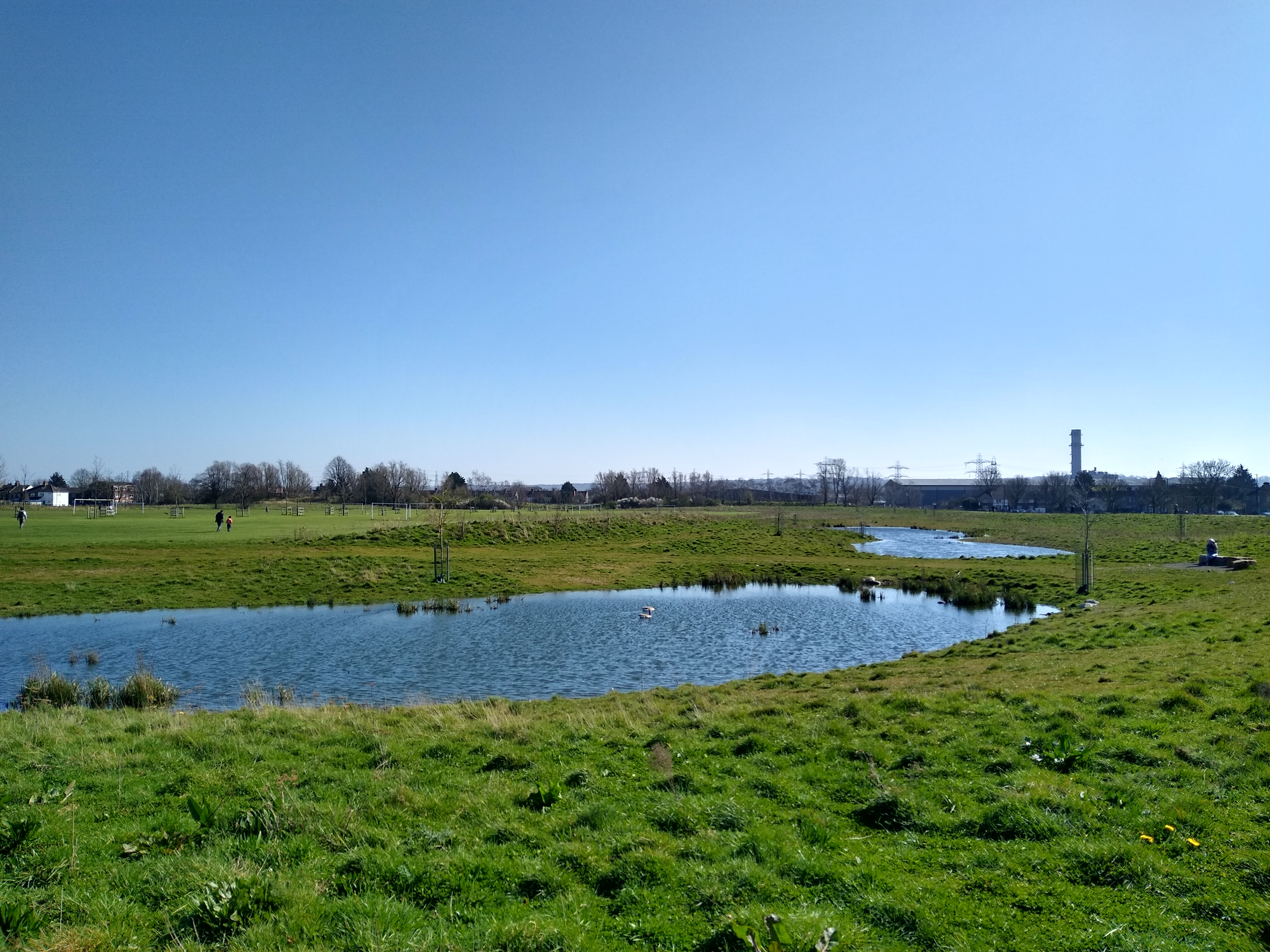
Albany Park in Enfield Wash

On what had been College Farm, Albany Park, Enfield, the park was created circa 1902, probably so named to commemorate Prince Leopold, Duke of Albany, the youngest son of Queen Victoria, who died in 1884.

The London Outer Orbital Path (Section 17) follows the course of Turkey Brook which flows west–east through the park.

== Schools ==
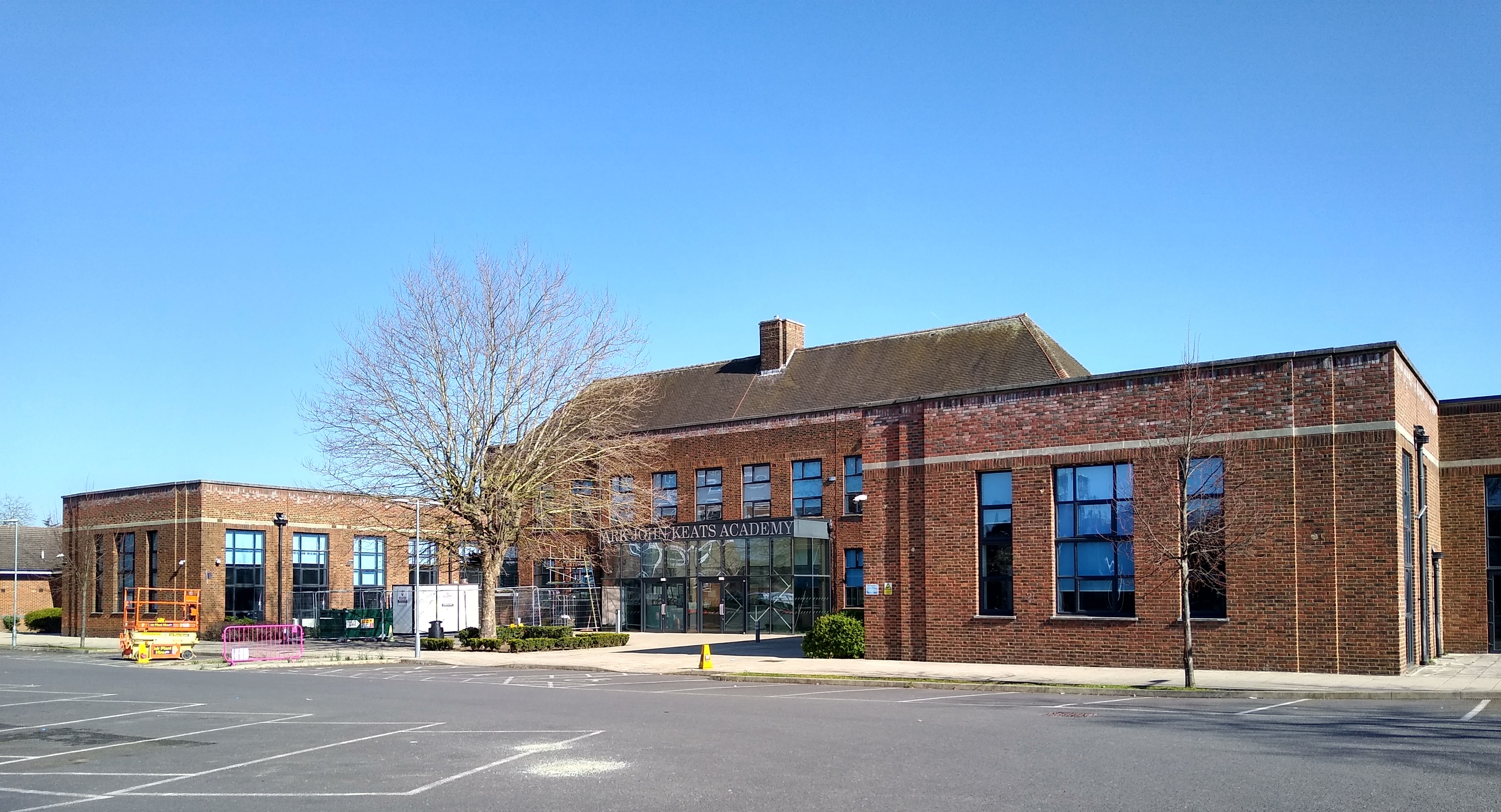
Ark John Keats Academy

Albany School, which was in Bell Lane, adjacent to Albany Park, was opened as a coeducational secondary modern school in 1939, and was converted to a comprehensive school in 1967. It closed in 2009 and a new academy, Oasis Academy Hadley, was opened by the Oasis Trust on the site. However, the academy relocated to Ponders End in 2013. In 2015 Ark John Keats Academy, an all through school for pupils aged 4–18 opened on the site.

== Politics ==
Enfield Wash is part of the Enfield North parliamentary constituency. The current MP is the Labour politician Feryal Clark.
