= Ark John Keats Academy =

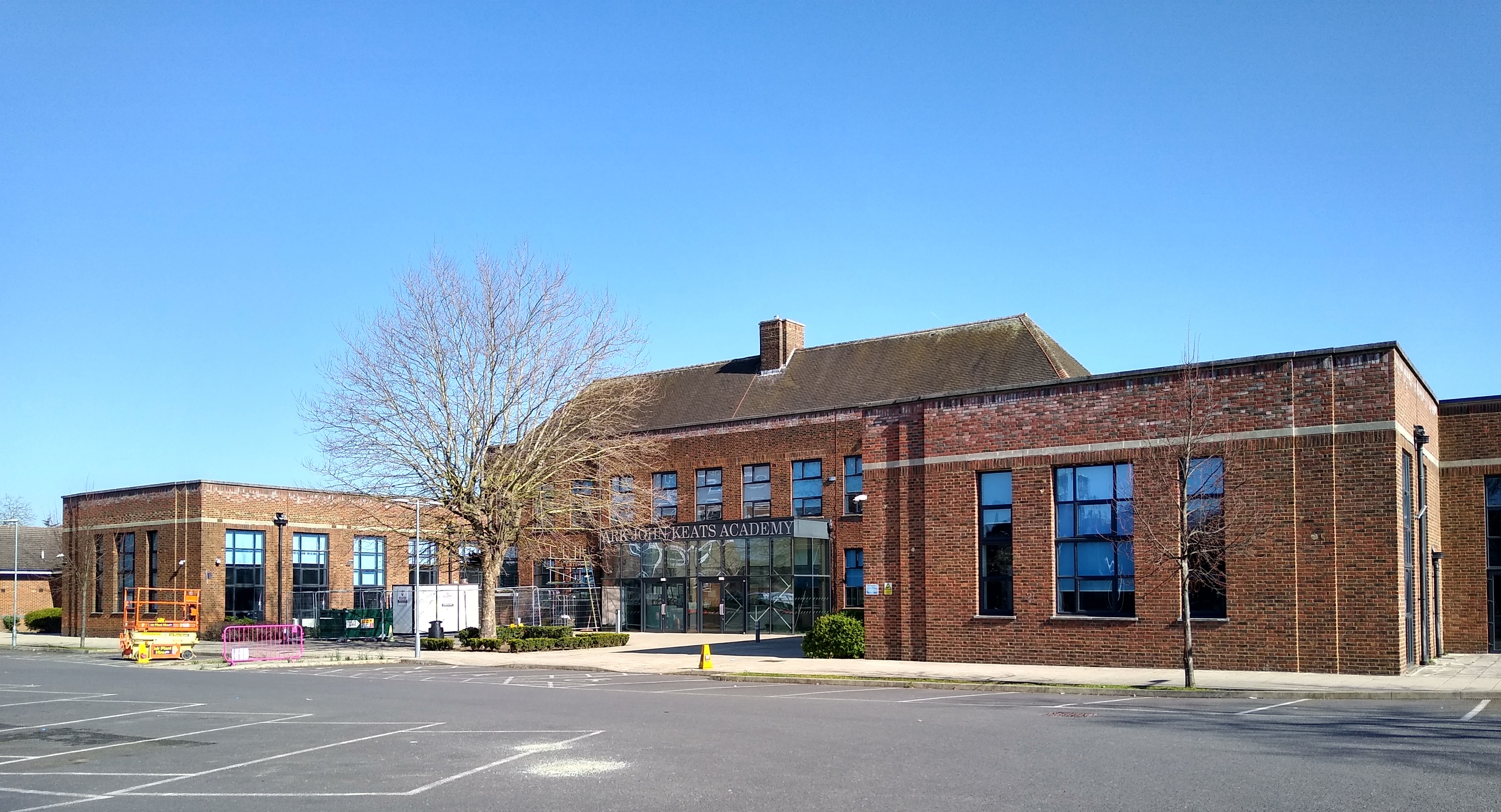

Location
- Bell Lane; Enfield Wash; London, EN3 5PA; England; 51.6664°N 0.0377°W

Information
- Type: Free school
- Established: September 2013
- Local authority: Enfield
- Trust: Ark Schools
- Department for Education URN: 139815 Tables
- Ofsted: Reports
- Principal: Daniel Conant
- Gender: Co-educational
- Age: 3 to 19
- Website: arkjohnkeats.org

Ark John Keats Academy is a co-educational all-through school and sixth form located in the Enfield Wash area of London, England.

It is a free school educating primary and Secondary school pupils, and is sponsored by Ark Schools. The school is named after John Keats, the poet.

Ark John Keats Academy is located on the site which used to house Albany School until it closed in 2009. The site then housed Oasis Academy Hadley until that school relocated to Ponders End in 2013.
