= William Davy (lawyer) =

English barrister

William Davy SL (died 1780) was an English barrister during the 18th century. Known as "Bull" Davy, he was noted as quick-witted, with a ready sense of humour, but, according to one author, relatively unscrupulous.

According to Humphry William Woolrych, he was originally either a grocer or a pharmacist before being declared bankrupt and learning the doctrines around nisi prius, for which much study was not required. He was admitted to the Inner Temple on 16 October 1741.

Early in his career was responsible for prosecuting Elizabeth Canning. Davy became a Serjeant-at-Law on 11 February 1754, and soon after became involved in prosecutions under the Black Act. In 1762 he became King's Serjeant, then the highest accolade for a barrister.

Davy argued that "the air (of England) is too pure for a slave to breathe in" when he represented James Somerset, an escaped African slave come from Boston whose London godparents had sued for a writ of Habeas Corpus, in Somerset v Stewart. This case was one of the first tests of Habeas Corpus when the gaoler had no colour of state; the writ had been conceived in the midst of the English Civil War as the Habeas Corpus Act 1640, in order to defend the subject from government tyranny.

Davy died on 13 December 1780, and was buried in Newington Butts.

== Bibliography ==
- Wise, Steven M. (2005). Though the Heavens May Fall: The Landmark Trial that Led to the End of Human Slavery. Da Capo Press. ISBN 9780738206950.
- Woolrych, Humphry William (1869). Lives of Eminent Serjeants-at-law of the English Bar. Vol. 2. W.H. Allen.
