= Enfield Lock (lock) =

Water navigational degice in a London borough

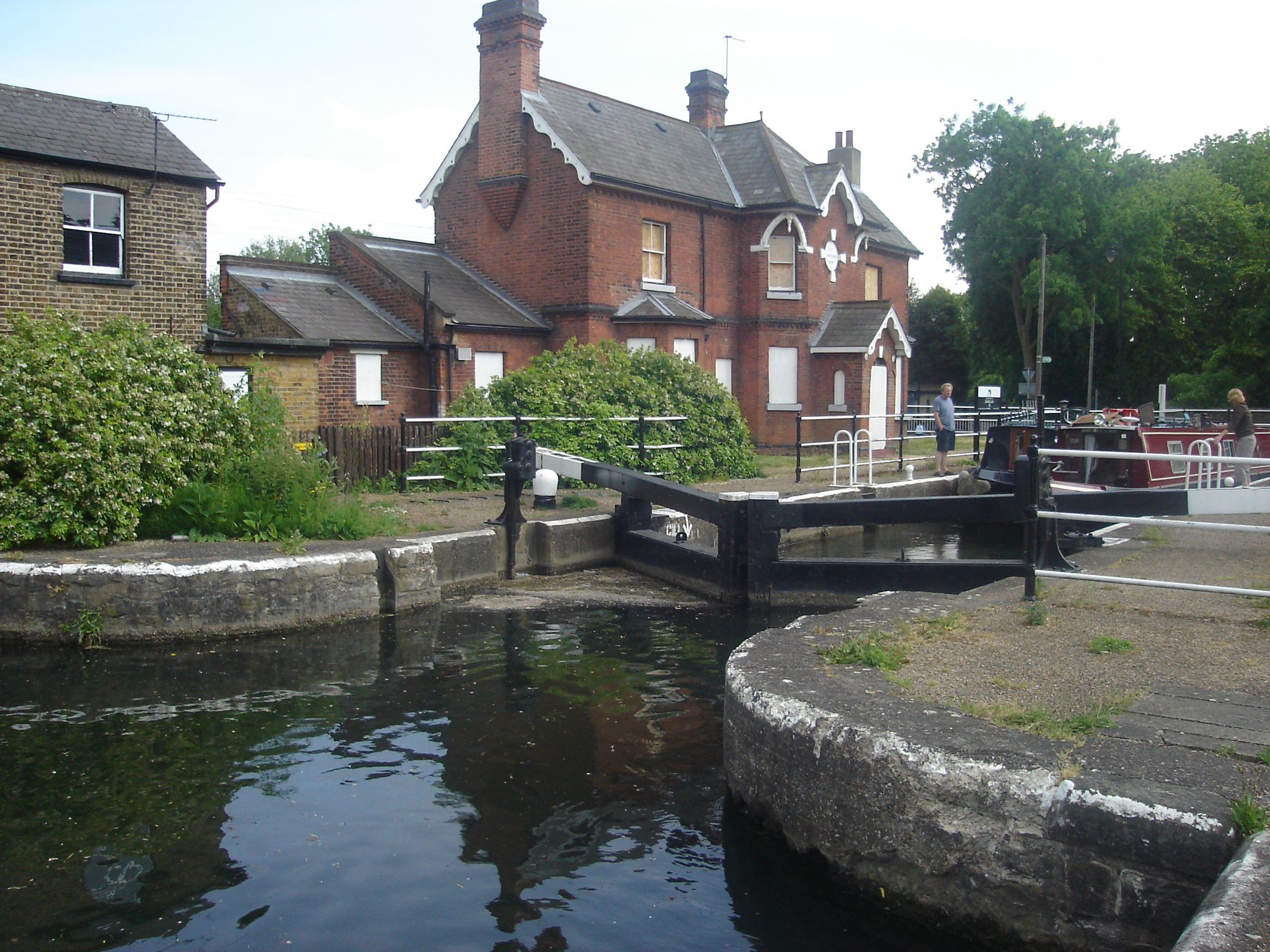
- The lock, cottages and toll office
- Interactive map of Enfield Lock
- 51.667319°N 0.018207°W
- Waterway: River Lee Navigation
- County: London Borough of Enfield; Greater London
- Maintained by: Canal & River Trust
- Operation: Manual
- First built: 1725
- Length: 84 feet (25.6 m)
- Width: 16 feet (4.9 m)
- Fall: 9 feet 7 inches (2.9 m)
- Distance to Bow Creek: 11.5 miles (18.5 km)
- Distance to Hertford Castle Weir: 14.8 miles (23.8 km)

Enfield Lock (No 13) is a lock on the River Lee Navigation, in the London Borough of Enfield. It gives its name to the surrounding area of Enfield Lock. The lock is close to site of the former Royal Small Arms Factory, now known as Enfield Island Village. It is the first of the smaller locks upstream to Hertford which were built to allow barges up to a maximum 100 tons.

== Etymology ==
Enfield Lock was recorded thus in 1710, earlier as Norhtlok 1355, The Locke 1657, 'the (northern) lock or river barrier (near Enfield)', from Middle English lok.

== History ==
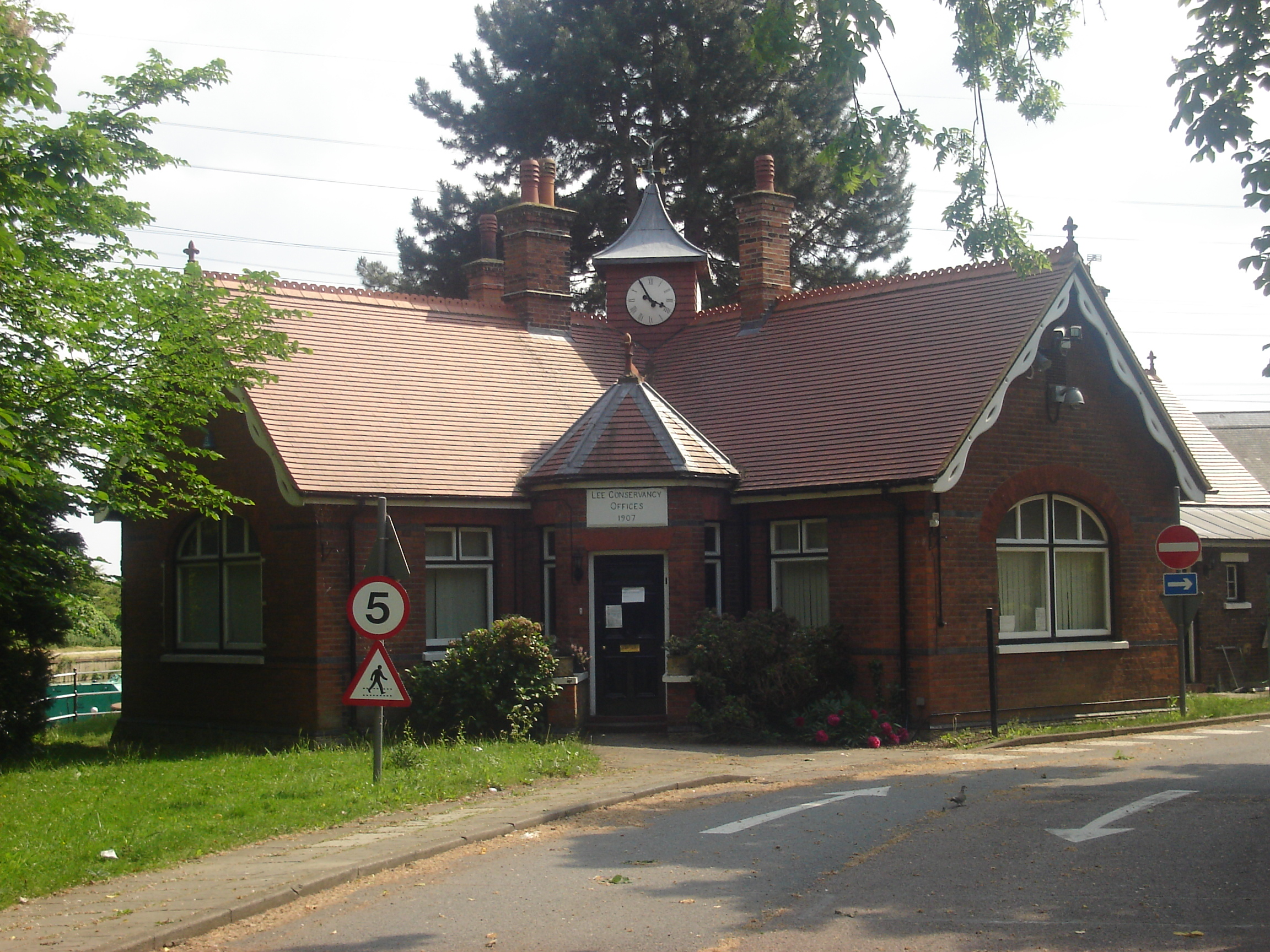
Canal & River Trust offices

A lock on this site has been extant since 1725. The present day structure was re-built in 1922. At the lock are red brick cottages and a Lee Conservancy Board toll office of 1889. Below the lock, a water maintenance depot, with clock turret on the cruciform planned office building of 1907.

== Public access ==
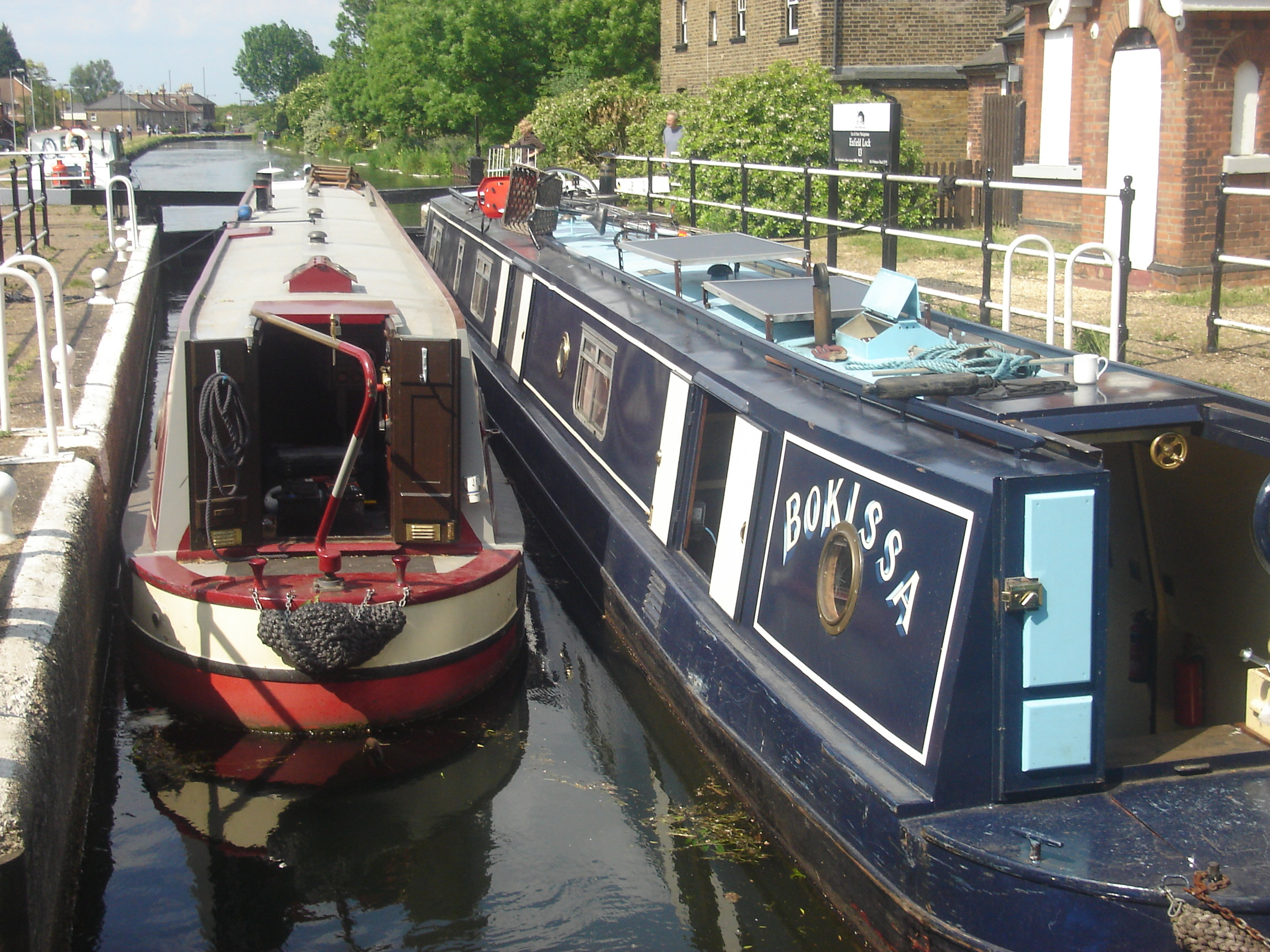
Narrowboats passing through the lock

The lock is located adjacent to Ordnance Road.

Enfield Lock railway station is close by.

The area is served by the 491 and 121 London bus routes.

| Next lock upstream | River Lee Navigation | Next lock downstream |
| Rammey Marsh Lock; 0.8 mile | Enfield Lock (lock); Grid reference: TQ3703798415 | Ponder's End Lock; 2.0 miles |
