= Fern House School =

Coeducational special school in London, United Kingdom

Location
- Keswick Drive; Enfield; London, EN3 6NY; England; 51.6742°N 0.0436°W

Information
- Type: Academy special school
- Established: 1969; 57 years ago
- Local authority: London Borough of Enfield
- Department for Education URN: 145232 Tables
- Ofsted: Reports
- Headteacher: Laura Astarita
- Gender: Mixed-sex education
- Age: 5 to 16
- Enrolment: As of 2026: 72
- Capacity: As of 2026: 70
- Website: www.fernhouseschool.org

Fern House School, formerly Aylands School, is a mixed-sex special school in Freezywater, Enfield, London, United Kingdom, for children who have social, emotional or mental health difficulties. As of 2026, it has 72 pupils, and accepts children aged 5 to 16. All pupils have an education, health and care plan. The school is an academy, as part of the multi-academy trust Connect Education Trust.

== History ==
The school was established in 1969 as Aylands School.

In 2017 it was inspected by Ofsted, judged inadequate and placed in special measures. The school's previous three inspections, in 2006, 2009 and 2015, had resulted in judgements that the school was outstanding. Following the judgement of inadequate, the school was renamed Fern House School and moved to temporary accommodation on another school's site; whilst there, in 2022, it was re-inspected and judged good.

By 2021, the original school buildings were derelict and the council planned to replace them. The new buildings opened, as Fern House School, in 2025.
