= Freezywater =

Area of Enfield, London, England

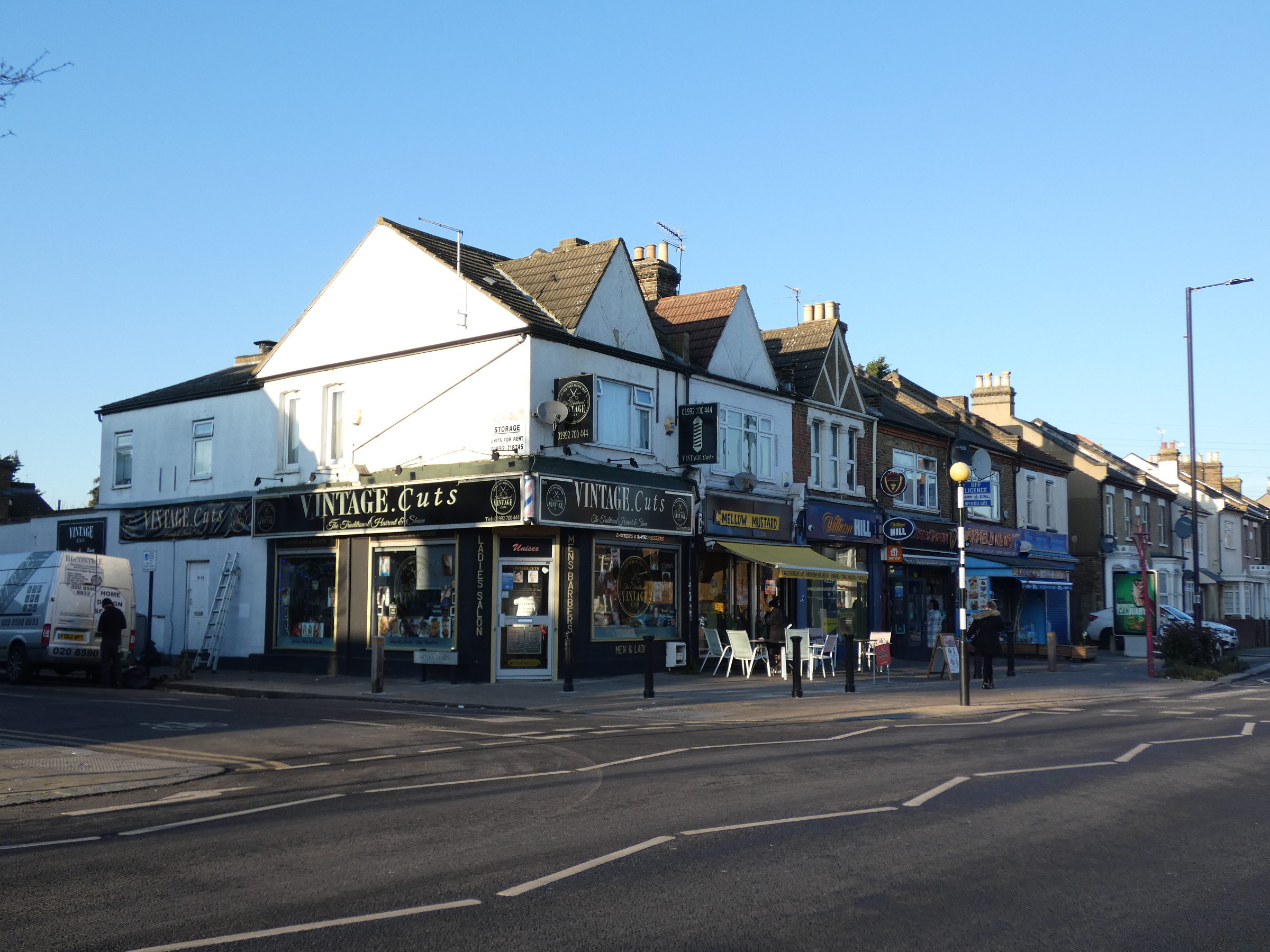
- Hertford Road in Freezywater

- Location within Greater London
- OS grid reference: TQ361993
- London borough: Enfield
- Ceremonial county: Greater London
- Region: London
- Country: England
- Sovereign state: United Kingdom
- Post town: ENFIELD
- Postcode district: EN3
- Dialling code: 020, 01992
- Police: Metropolitan
- Fire: London
- Ambulance: London
- UK Parliament: Enfield North
- London Assembly: Enfield and Haringey

Freezywater is a neighbourhood of the traditional broad definition of Enfield in the London Borough of Enfield, North London. It has a border with Hertfordshire. It is between Bullsmoor to the west, Enfield Lock to the east, Enfield Wash to the south, and Waltham Cross, Hertfordshire to the north. It became more than a hamlet at the beginning of the 20th century.

Freezywater occupies a zone straddling Hertford Road from its junction with Ordnance Road in the south to Bullsmoor Lane and the Holmesdale Tunnel overpass in the north. It is generally deemed to commence westwards from the Liverpool Street to Cheshunt railway.

== Etymology ==
First recorded as Freezywater (1768) and Freezy Water (1819); the local farm choosing to name itself after its fishpond or duck pond which was liable to freeze.

== Local history ==
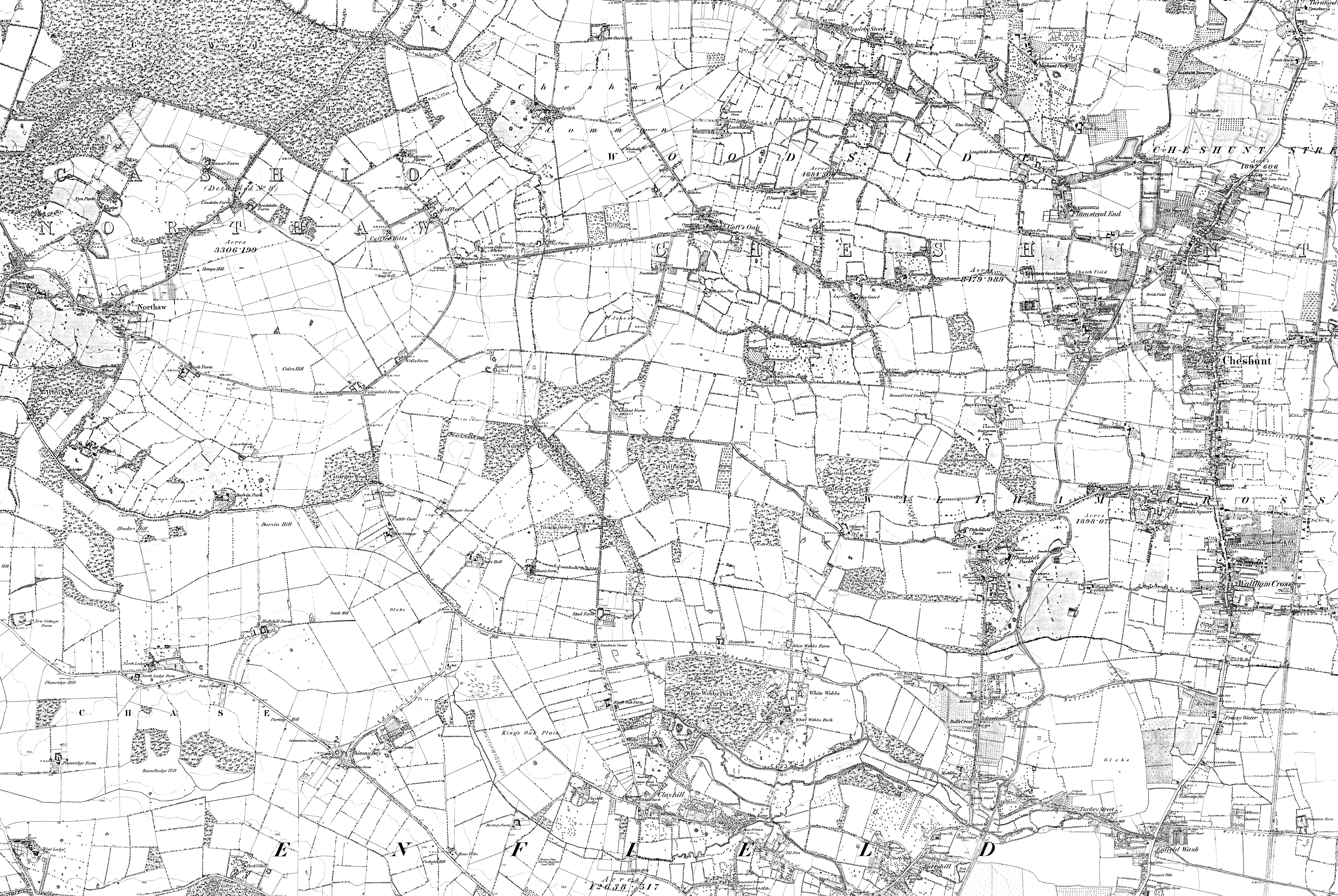
Freezywater in about 1880. Click for broader map and/or for varied magnification.

For centuries this area was farmed principally by three farms and smallholdings, the greatest being Freezywater Farm which was long one of the manor's tenant farms, the others being Totteridge House and Freezywater House. In the 18th century this was called Freezy Water Farm, and later developments largely informally took on the name until the completion of its church in 1906.

During World War II, Chesterfield School was hit by a V1 flying bomb aimed for the Royal Small Arms Factory, about 1.5 miles (2.4 km) due east of the school. There was one fatality in the grounds, a teacher looking for her school children.

The church of Saint George, a large red-brick gothic building designed by JEK and JP Cutts, was built between 1900 and 1906. A planned tower was never constructed. It replaced a temporary iron church on a site next to it which remained in use as a church hall for many years.

== Nearest places ==
Immediately

- Bullsmoor
- Waltham Cross
- Enfield Lock
- Enfield Wash

Beyond

- Waltham Abbey
- Enfield Town
- Brimsdown
- Cheshunt
- Chingford

== Nearest railway stations ==
- Enfield Lock railway station
- Waltham Cross railway station
- Turkey Street railway station

== Schools ==
- Primary schools: Chesterfield Infant School, Chesterfield Junior School, Freezywater St George's Primary School (Church of England), Honilands School
- Secondary school: Lea Valley Academy, formerly Bullsmoor Secondary school
- Special school: Fern House School, formerly Aylands School

== Open spaces ==
- Cunningham Park 51.6783°N 0.031°W
