= Enfield Highway =

Coordinates: 51.662°N 0.041°W

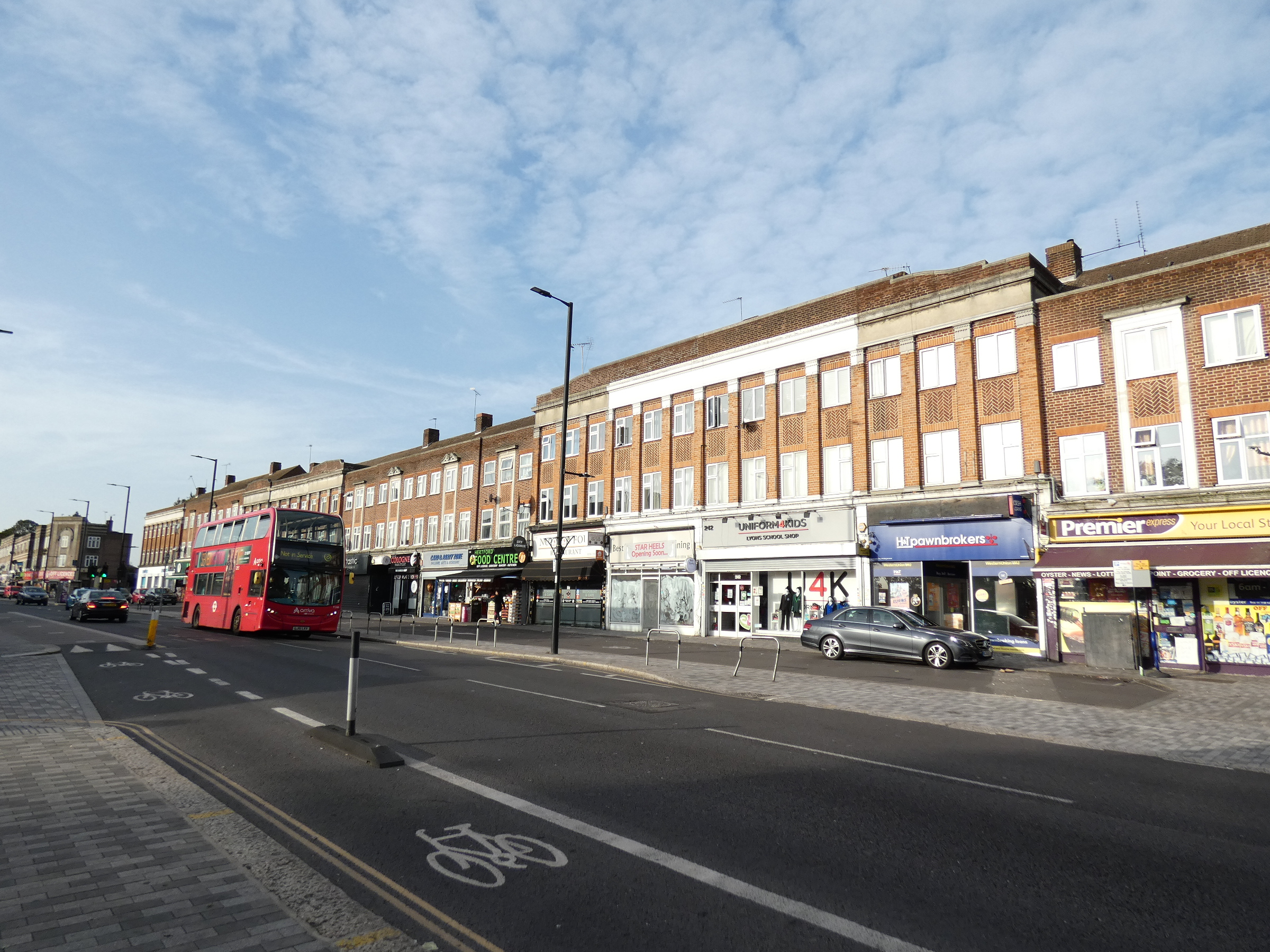
- The main shopping parade in Enfield Highway

- Location within Greater London
- Population: 16,027 (2011 Census.Ward)
- OS grid reference: TQ355975
- London borough: Enfield
- Ceremonial county: Greater London
- Region: London
- Country: England
- Sovereign state: United Kingdom
- Post town: ENFIELD
- Postcode district: EN1, EN3
- Dialling code: 020
- Police: Metropolitan
- Fire: London
- Ambulance: London
- UK Parliament: Enfield North
- London Assembly: Enfield and Haringey

Enfield Highway is an area in the London Borough of Enfield, north London. It is roughly located in the area either side of Hertford Road (Enfield Highway) between Hoe Lane and The Ride.

== Etymology ==
Enfield Highway is marked thus on the Ordnance Survey map of 1822, it is a settlement mainly from the eighteenth century named from the kings highe way leading to London 1610, the highway being the Roman road Ermine Street (now the A1010 Hertford Road).

The name of the hamlet along this stretch of road was recorded as "Cocksmiths End" in 1572 and in 1658.

== Education ==
- Enfield College
- St Ignatius' College
- Bishop Stopford's School

Thomas Ford in his history of Enfield (1873) records the existence in Enfield Highway of "a school for 160 boys, with a master's house, built in 1872, near the Church, under a certificated master and three pupil teachers" and a "girls' and infants' school at the Highway, for 260 children, taught by a certificated mistress, and four pupil teachers."

== Library ==
A public library, built with the aid of a grant from the Carnegie Foundation was opened Enfield Highway in 1910. An enlarged lending library was added to the rear of the building in 1938. The borough's travelling library (started in 1947) was originally based there.

== Places of worship ==
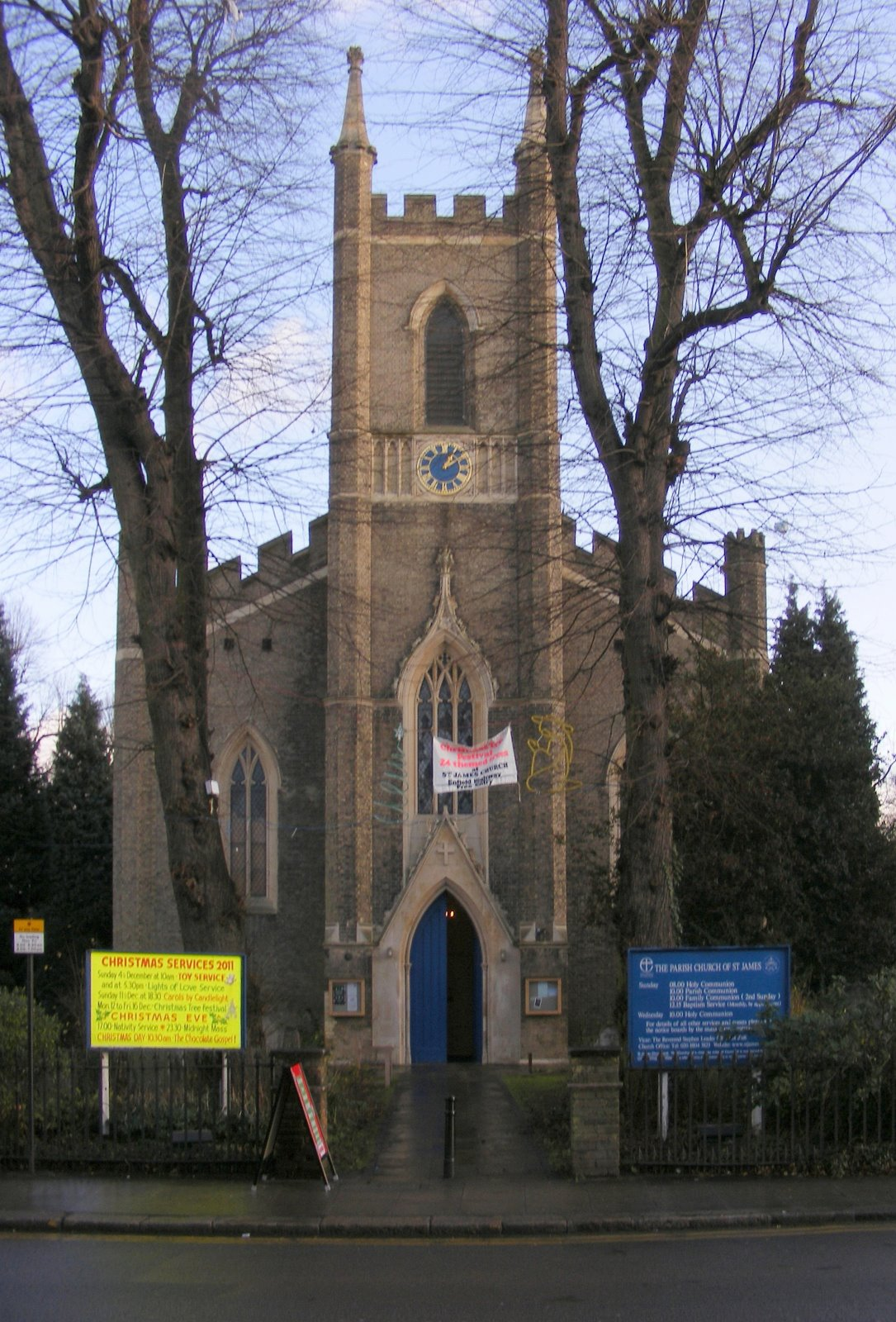
St James' church

St James' Church, a brick gothic Commissioners' church designed by William Conrad Lochner, was consecrated in 1831 The first Anglican place of worship to be established in Enfield in addition to the parish church, St James' was built by subscription as a chapel of ease on land given by Woodham Connop. It was consecrated on 15 October by the Bishop of London, Charles Blomfield. A district was assigned to the church on 9 December 1833. It comprised the whole of the parish of east of a line drawn at a distance of 150 yards to the west of the main road from Edmonton to Cheshunt. The church was licensed for marriages in 1845.

== Open spaces ==
For King George's Field, see main article List of King George V Playing Fields (Greater London)

Durants Park was created in 1903 from the estate of the former manor house called Durrants. It was named after the family of Adam Durant from 1244. It later became the home of the Wroth and Stringer families. The gatehouse of the manor survived until 1910.

== Wright's Almshouses ==
On the west side of the Hertford Road is a terraced row of six almshouses, with a stone tablet bearing the inscription: "These almshouses were erected and endowed by Mr. Charles Wright, of Enfield-highway, for the support of six poor widows, A.D. 1847." Wright built the almshouses a few years before his death in 1851, and by a deed of 1848 conveyed them to trustees, who were given the responsibility of choosing six poor widows, aged over sixty, with an income of no more £10 a year, and not receiving parochial relief, to occupy them. The widows were also to receive a sum of £10 annually, and one ton of coal each winter. The almshouses form a grade II listed building.

== Demography ==
In the 2011 census, White British was the largest ethnic group at 38%, followed by 18% Other White and 12% Black African.

== Politics ==
Enfield Highway forms part of the Enfield North parliamentary constituency in the House of Commons.

== In popular culture ==
Some scenes in the BBC TV movie Learners were filmed around Enfield Highway.

== Transport and locale ==
=== Nearest places ===
- Enfield Wash
- Ponders End
- Brimsdown

=== Nearest railway stations ===
- Southbury railway station
- Brimsdown railway station

=== Buses ===
London Buses routes 121, 191, 279, 307 and night route N279 serve Hertford Road, the main road of Enfield Highway.
