= A1010 road =

Road in London, England

A1010

Location
- Country: United Kingdom
- Constituent country: England

Road network
- Roads in the United Kingdom; Motorways; A and B road zones

51.5976°N 0.0704°W

The A1010 is a road running through north London from Bruce Grove in Tottenham to Waltham Cross. It also used to continue north through Cheshunt to Turnford. The road parallels the A10 Great Cambridge Road to its west.

== Route ==
The southern end of the A1010 is named Tottenham High Road, becoming Fore Street from Upper Edmonton to Edmonton Green. For the northern part the name Hertford Road is used, passing through Ponders End, Enfield Highway, Enfield Wash, Freezywater and Bullsmoor. At Waltham Cross the old route is the pedestrianised High Street, which the designated A1010 by-passes, terminating at the A121. To the north the historic route to Ware is now designated as the B176 and A1170.

== History ==
The road is part of the historic Hertford Road, a route running north from Bishopsgate along the western side of the Lea Valley, through Stoke Newington, Tottenham, Edmonton, Ponders End, Waltham Cross, Cheshunt and Broxbourne to Hoddesdon, where it split into Hertford and Ware branches. The southern end of the Hertford Road between London and Tottenham is thought to follow the Roman Ermine Street and the northern end takes a more easterly course through Edmonton and Enfield than the built-over Roman northern section.

The route from London to Ware was designated in the early 20th century as the southern section of the A10. Large sections were progressively by-passed by dual carriageway. The A1010 was the earliest section to be by-passed, by the Great Cambridge Road (originally designated A108) which runs parallel about 1 mile (1.6 km) to the west. Unlike the new road, which developed as an important centre of the electronics industry, the old road remained generally more commercial and residential in nature.

== In popular culture ==
The route is featured in William Cowper's 1782 comic ballad The Diverting History of John Gilpin, which describes the chaotic progress of the hero along the road from London to Ware and back, failing twice to stop his borrowed horse at his intended destination, the Bell public house in Edmonton.

The Enfield Highway section of the A1010 was used to film the BBC TV movie Learners.
