= Gordon Hill, London =

Coordinates: 51.665018°N 0.087065°W

Gordon Hill
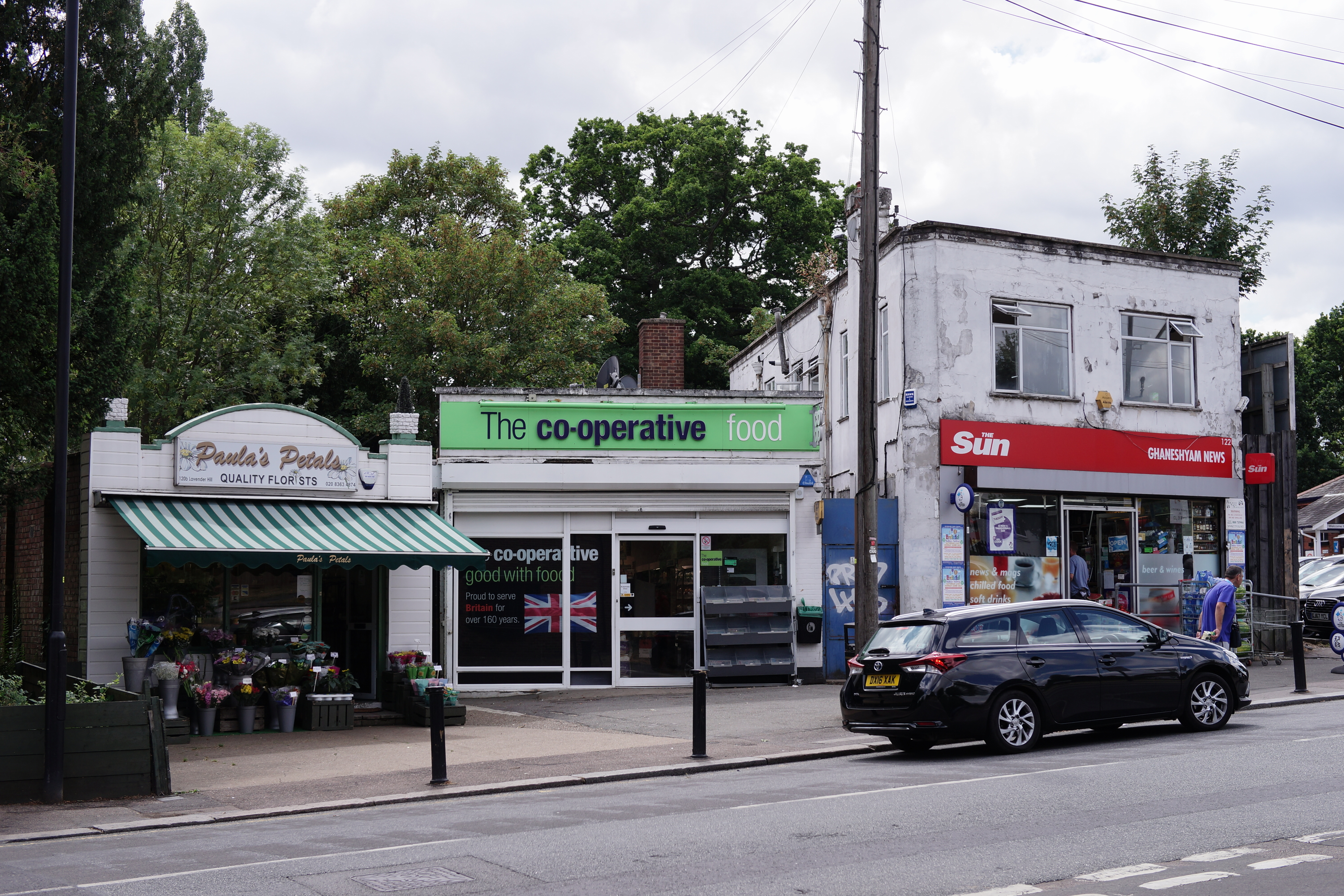
- Shops on Lavender Hill

- Location within Greater London
- OS grid reference: TQ323979
- London borough: Enfield
- Ceremonial county: Greater London
- Region: London
- Country: England
- Sovereign state: United Kingdom
- Post town: ENFIELD
- Postcode district: EN2
- Dialling code: 020
- Police: Metropolitan
- Fire: London
- Ambulance: London
- UK Parliament: Enfield North
- London Assembly: Enfield and Haringey

Gordon Hill is a district of Enfield in the London Borough of Enfield, located to the north-west of Enfield Town. Adjoining areas include Clay Hill, Enfield Chase, Enfield Town, Crews Hill, Forty Hill and World's End.

It is served by Gordon Hill railway station in London fare zone 5.

Gordon Hill has a number of shops, restaurants and pubs located on Lavender Hill and Lancaster Road. Also located in Gordon Hill is Chase Farm Hospital.

== History ==
Gordon Hill is developed on the site of the 18th-century mansion Gordon House. Gordon House was built on the Chase near the top of what is now Gordon Hill. It was named after an early occupant, Lord George Gordon (1751–93), instigator of the Gordon Riots. It later belonged to Sir Thomas Hallifax (1721–89), Lord Mayor of London. Gordon House was demolished in about 1860, and the area laid out for housing. Development accelerated in 1909 with the arrival of the railway.

== Demography ==
The Gordon Hill area overlaps the Highlands, Chase and Town wards. Highlands also includes World's End and eastern Oakwood. According to the 2011 census, 80% of the population of Highlands was white (64% British, 13% Other, 3% Irish).

== Transport and locale ==
=== Nearest railway stations ===
- Gordon Hill railway station is situated atop Gordon Hill Road on Lavender Hill
- Enfield Chase railway station is situated below Gordon Hill Road at the beginning of Chaseside.
- Enfield Town is situated below Gordon Hill within Enfield Chase.

=== Buses ===
Gordon Hill is served by many bus links with London Buses route 191 which stops at the bottom of Gordon Hill and then continues on to Lancaster Road, 313 which goes to the beginning of Chase Side, W8 which goes up Lancaster Road to Lavender Hill and onto Chase Farm Hospital and W9 and non-London route 610.
