= London Buses route 456 =

London bus route

456
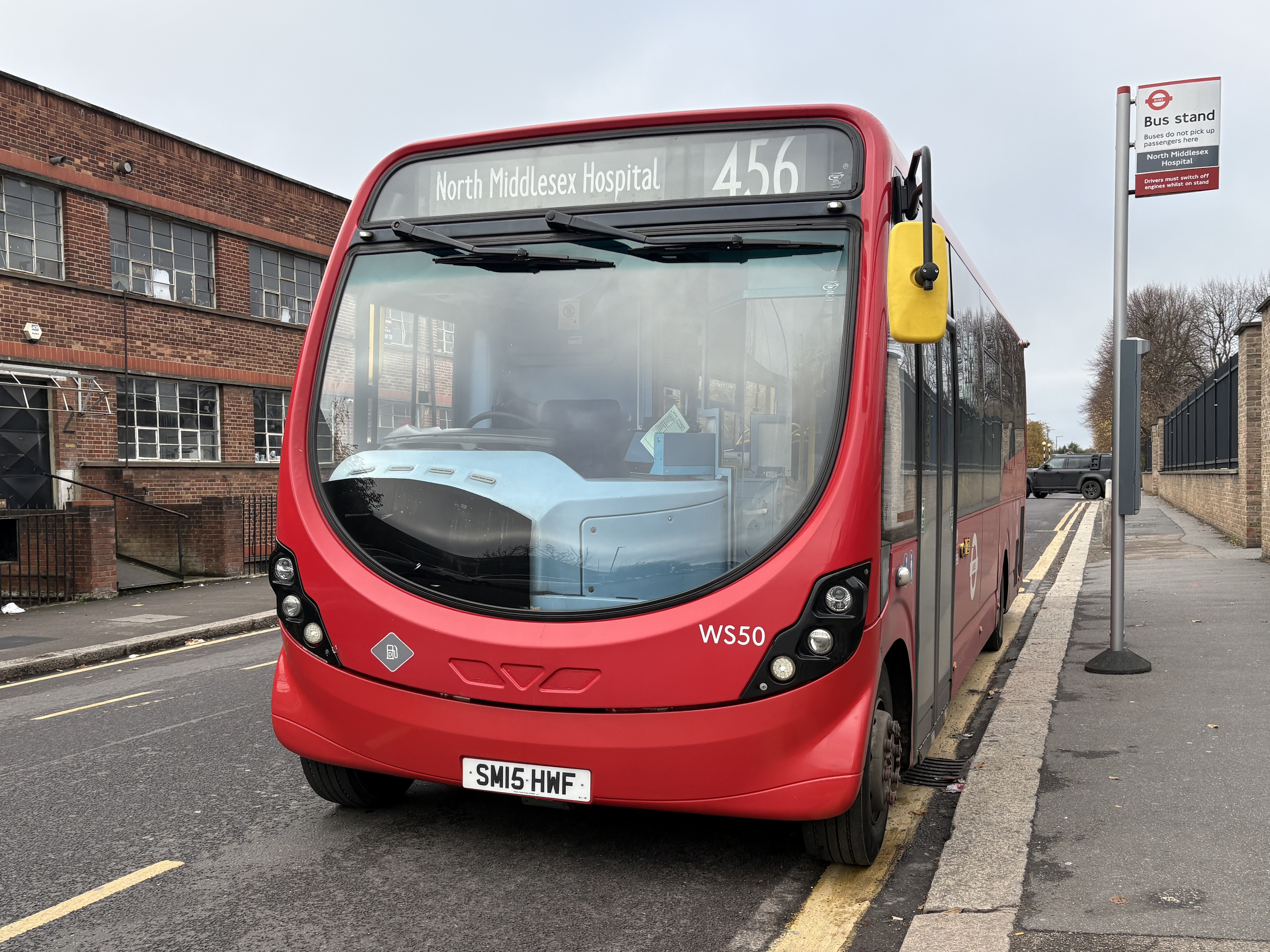
- London General Wright StreetLite WF at North Middlesex University Hospital in November 2025

Overview
- Operator: London General (Go-Ahead London)
- Garage: Northumberland Park
- Vehicle: Wright StreetLite WF
- Peak vehicle requirement: 5
- Predecessors: Route W10
- Night-time: No night service

Route
- Start: North Middlesex University Hospital
- Via: Edmonton; Winchmore Hill; Enfield Town; Forty Hill
- End: Crews Hill
- Length: 10 miles (16 km)

Service
- Level: Daily
- Frequency: About every 30-60 minutes
- Journey time: 38-63 minutes
- Operates: 06:10 until 20:54

London Buses route 456 is a Transport for London contracted bus route in London, England. Running between North Middlesex University Hospital and Crews Hill, it is operated by Go-Ahead London subsidiary London General.

== History ==
Transport for London consulted on adding the route in October 2019.

It is planned to install additional stops on Bincote Road for the route to call at.

== Current route ==
Route 456 operates via these primary locations:

- North Middlesex University Hospital
- Silver Street station
- Winchmore Hill station
- Grange Park
- Enfield Chase station
- Enfield Town station
- Forty Hill
- Crews Hill
