= List of public art in the London Borough of Enfield =

This is a list of public art in the London Borough of Enfield.

== Cockfosters ==
Image	Title / subject	Location and coordinates	Date	Artist / designer	Architect / other	Type	Designation	Notes
More images	Cockfosters War Memorial	Junction of Chalk Lane and Cockfosters Road 51.6549°N 0.1525°W	1921			Celtic cross	Grade II	

== Edmonton ==
Image	Title / subject	Location and coordinates	Date	Artist / designer	Architect / other	Type	Designation	Notes
	Portrait plaque of Charles Lamb	Community House, 313 Fore Street 51.6199°N 0.0625°E	1898	George Frampton	—N/a	Relief		
	Portrait plaque of John Keats	Community House, 313 Fore Street 51.6199°N 0.0625°E	1898	George Frampton	—N/a	Relief		
More images	Edmonton War Memorial	Edmonton Green Roundabout, near the station 51.6249°N 0.0605°W	1924	Louis Frederick Roslyn	—N/a	Cenotaph	Grade II	Unveiled 26 October 1924.
	Sculpture on exterior wall	St Mary's Church Centre, Lawrence Road 51.6175°N 0.0577°W	c. 1970			Architectural sculpture	—N/a	
	Gilpin's Bell	Fore Street 51.6123°N 0.0650°W	December 1996	Angela Godfrey	—N/a	Sculpture	—N/a	
	The Keats and Lamb bench	Junction of Church Street and Winchester Road 51.6261°N 0.064759°W	1999	Tim Shutter	—N/a	Sculptural bench	—N/a	Hillhouse Edge sandstone seat with a quill pen back. The paving in the shape of an open book incorporates quotes from the poet John Keats and the writer Charles Lamb who both lived near to this site. Seat 825 mm × 3,500 mm × 600 mm (32.5 in × 140 in × 24 in), floor panels 600 mm × 1,650 mm (24 in × 65 in) each.
	Monty the metal horse	Chad Crescent 51.6234°N 0.0476°W	2004	Iain Nutting	—N/a	Sculpture	—N/a	
	Mosaic of Marie Lloyd	Edmonton Green Shopping Centre, Entrance to the Market Square 51.6247°N 0.0574°W	2010	Pupils of St Edmund's Roman Catholic Primary School	—N/a	Mosaic	—N/a	

== Enfield ==
Image	Title / subject	Location and coordinates	Date	Artist / designer	Architect / other	Type	Designation	Notes
	Sundial	The lake terrace, Myddelton House Gardens, Bulls Cross 51°40′30.09″N 0°3′37.47″W	Pedestal early 1700s; sundial replaced in 2010			Sundial	Grade II	
	Stone Lion	Forty Hall 51.6698°N 0.0680°W	19th century or earlier			Statue		
	Young boy holding apron with puppies	The lake terrace, Myddelton House Gardens, Bulls Cross 51°40′28.24″N 0°3′41.53″W	19th century	Flemish	—N/a	Statue	Grade II	
More images	Enfield Old Market Cross	Myddelton House Gardens, Bulls Cross	1826 (moved to Myddelton House 1904)			Market cross	Grade II	
More images	Drinking fountain	Church Street 51°39′7.4″N 0°4′51.6″W	1884			Drinking fountain		
More images	Enfield War Memorial	Chase Green 51.6539°N 0.0888°W	1921	?	?	Cenotaph	Grade II	Unveiled 30 October 1921.
	Stone Lion	Forty Hall 51.6698°N 0.0680°W	Moved from Broomfield House in the 1980s			Statue		
More images	Millennium Fountain	River Walk 51°39′13.2″N 0°5′16.6″W	2000	Wendy Taylor	—N/a	Fountain with sculpture	—N/a	
More images	Arctic Campaign Memorial	Silver Street 51.6542°N 0.0803°W	November 2003			War memorial	—N/a	
	Piper	The lake terrace, Myddelton House Gardens, Bulls Cross 51°40′28.24″N 0°3′41.53″W	Recarved c. 2008 (original was stolen)			Statue	—N/a	
	Turkey Brook Guardian	Turkey Street Gateway Open Space 51.6722°N 0.0464°W	26 July 2013	Tim Shutter	—N/a	Sculpture	—N/a	An amalgam of a fish, bird, squirrel and dog, sitting on a turkey egg embedded with pebbles from the brook. Carved in Stoke ground base bed Bath stone. 150 by 120 by 92 centimetres (59 in × 47 in × 36 in).

== Palmers Green ==
Image	Title / subject	Location and coordinates	Date	Artist / designer	Architect / other	Type	Designation	Notes
	Palmers Green War Memorial	Outside St John the Evangelist's Church 51.6236°N 0.1043°W	?	John Angel	Frank O. Salisbury	Sculpture	—N/a	
More images	Garden of Remembrance	Broomfield Park 51.6166°N 0.1175°W	1929	—N/a	Robert Phillips	War memorial	—N/a	Opened 7 July 1929.

== Trent Park ==
Image	Title / subject	Location and coordinates	Date	Artist / designer	Architect / other	Type	Designation	Notes
	Actaeon	Left of main entrance to Trent Park House 51°39′35.63″N 0°8′6.97″W	c. 1700			Statue	Grade II	Brought from Wrest Park, Bedfordshire, in 1934 by Sir Philip Sassoon.
	Artemis or Venus	Right of main entrance to Trent Park House 51°39′35.68″N 0°8′5.26″W	c. 1700, with a later head			Statue	Grade II	Brought from Wrest Park, Bedfordshire, in 1934 by Sir Philip Sassoon.
	Sphinx (north)	Steps at east end of terrace, Trent Park House 51°39′36.58″N 0°8′4.48″W	c. 1700	John Nost		Sculpture	Grade II	Brought from Stowe House, Buckinghamshire, in the mid-1920s by Sir Philip Sassoon.
	Sphinx (south)	Steps at east end of terrace, Trent Park House 51°39′36.58″N 0°8′4.48″W	c. 1700	John Nost		Sculpture	Grade II	Brought from Stowe House, Buckinghamshire, in the mid-1920s by Sir Philip Sassoon.
	Time and Opportunity or Peace embracing Time	North west end of terrace, Trent Park House 51°39′36.83″N 0°8′7.43″W	Early 18th century	French School		Sculptural group	Grade II	Brought from Stowe House, Buckinghamshire, or Milton Abbey, Dorset, in the mid-1920s by Sir Philip Sassoon.
	Stone Urn	120m north west of Trent Park House 51°39′36.71″N 0°8′13.07″W	Early–mid-18th century			Urn	Grade II	Probably brought to Trent Park in the 1930s by Philip Sassoon.
More images	Memorial to Jemima Grey (née Crew), Duchess of Kent	East end of The Avenue 51°39′28.96″N 0°8′19.37″W	After 1728			Tall column with pineapple finial	Grade II	Inscribed "To the memory of Iemima Crewe, Duchess of Kent". Originally from Wrest Park, Bedfordshire.
More images	Memorial to George Grey, Earl of Harold	West side of Moat Wood 51°39′58.45″N 0°8′32.6″W	c. 1733			Obelisk	Grade II	Inscribed "To the memory of the birth of George Grey, Earl of Harold, son of Henry and Sophia, Duke and Duchess of Kent". Originally from Wrest Park, Bedfordshire.
More images	Memorial to Henry Grey, 1st Duke of Kent	West end of The Avenue 51°39′22.53″N 0°8′59.84″W	After 1740			Short obelisk with melon finial	Grade II	Inscribed "To the memory of Henry, Duke of Kent". Originally from Wrest Park, Bedfordshire.
	Samson Slaying a Philistine	North west of terrace, Trent Park House 51°39′37.28″N 0°8′8.11″W	18th century	Attributed to John Cheere or John Nost, after Giambologna		Sculptural group	Grade II	Previously installed in the Grecian Valley, landscaped by Capability Brown, in Stowe, Buckinghamshire. Purchased by Sir Philip Sassoon during the Stowe sales of 1921–22.
	Hercules and Antaeus	North east of terrace, Trent Park House 51°39′36.94″N 0°8′3.51″W	18th century	Attributed to John Cheere or John Nost, after Giambologna		Sculptural group	Grade II	Previously installed in the Grecian Valley, landscaped by Capability Brown, in Stowe, Buckinghamshire. Purchased by Sir Philip Sassoon during the Stowe sales of 1921–22.
	Wooden sculpture	South of footpath from Cockfosters Road to Trent Park House 51°39′23.08″N 0°8′42.35″W	2011	Friedel Buecking		Sculpture	—N/a	
