= 172 and 174 Baker Street =

Building in Enfield, London, England

Coordinates: 51°39′35″N 0°04′47″W

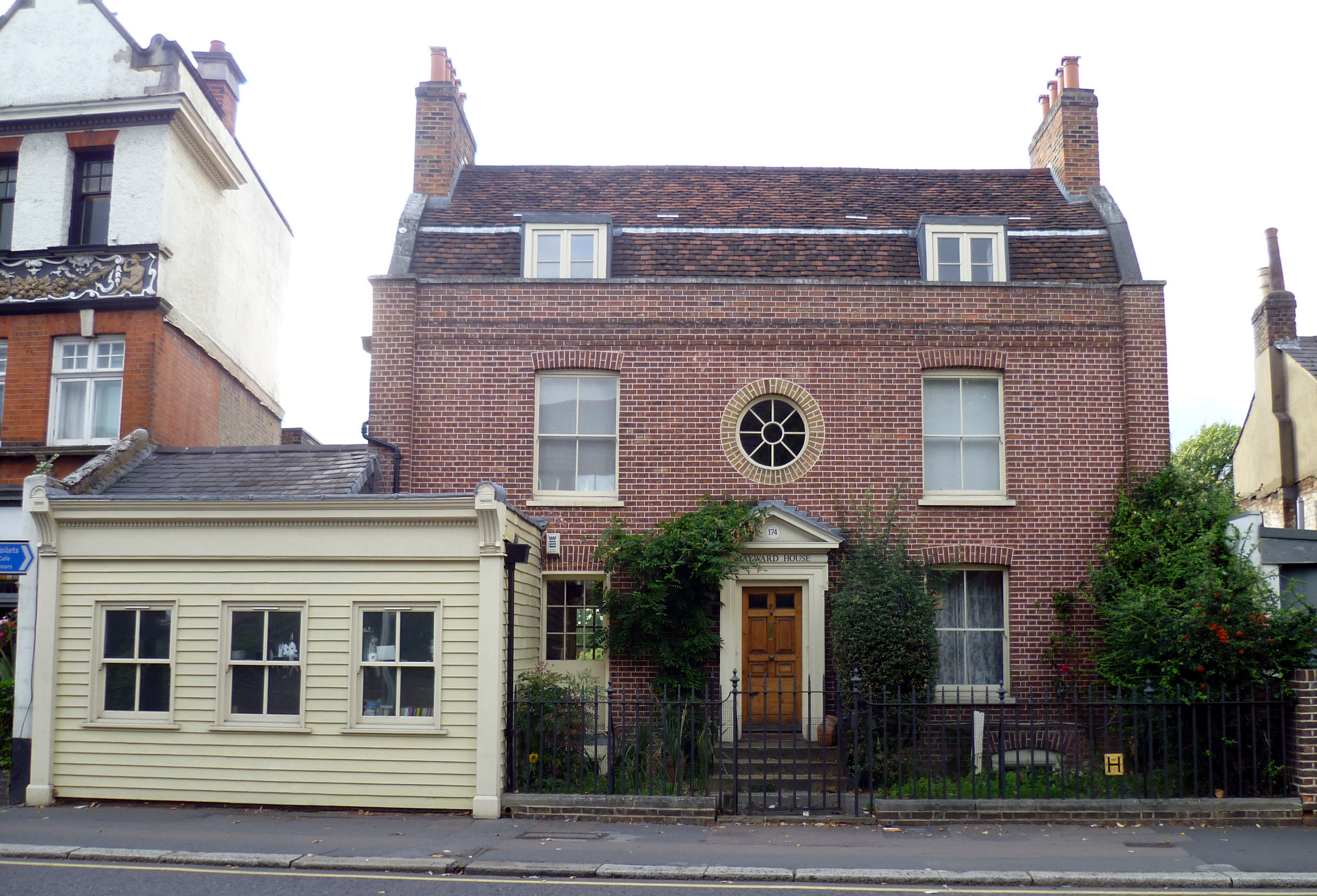
174 Baker Street

172 and 174 Baker Street is a grade II listed house in Enfield, London. Number 172 is a former shop and part of the brick built house while number 174 comprises the rest of the house. The shop was used by the National Deposit Friendly Society and had a door facing the street until recent times. The weatherboarding is modern.
