= St John's Senior School =

St. John's Prep and Senior School

Location
- The Ridgeway; Enfield, Middlesex, EN6 5QT (Preparatory) EN2 8BE (Senior); England; 51°40′56″N 0°08′43″W

Information
- Type: Co-educational
- Motto: Res ispa loquitur (Latin: The facts speak for themselves)
- Established: 1988
- Department for Education URN: 102065 Tables
- Ofsted: Reports
- Principal: Mrs. C. Tardios
- Headmaster: Mr. A. Tardios
- Gender: Co-educational
- Age: 3 to 18
- Website: stjohnsprepandseniorschool.co.uk

St. John's Prep and Senior School is a private all-through co-educational school in England. It is near the M25 motorway on the Ridgeway, Botany Bay, Enfield, London. It takes pupils from the age of 3 years up to 18.

== History ==
The school opened in 1988.

The school is an independent private school which made £2.0m profit in 2024/25 academic year (pre-tax).

In 2019, the school asked pupils not to wear their hair in cornrows, and then reversed its decision.

== Campus ==
The school is situated in a total of 28 acres (11 ha) of green belt land. There is an associated preparatory school along the road towards Potters Bar.

The building the school is in, North Lodge, is grade II listed. Before that, it was a remand home owned by Middlesex County Council, earlier again another school in the 1930s, and before that a private home.

== Curriculum ==
The school teaches GCSEs and A levels.

== Legal Disputes ==
The school (and conduct of senior leaders of the school) have been the subject of numerous legal disputes; in particular with regards to parents removing their children from the school; lack of basic facilities such as toilets and water supply; behaviour of senior staff towards pupils; lack of engagement and communication with parents (as evidenced by the lack of PTA group). The school's leadership is incredibly litigious to keep media scrutiny of these issues to a minimum.

== Inspections ==
In 2017 Ofsted judged the school 'Inadequate'. In 2019 it was judged Outstanding.

== Notable former pupils ==
- Ethan Nwaneri − Current Arsenal F.C. player and England youth International who plays as an attacking midfielder.
