= Botany Bay, London =

Hamlet in northern outskirts of London

Coordinates: 51.6765°N 0.1232°W

Botany Bay
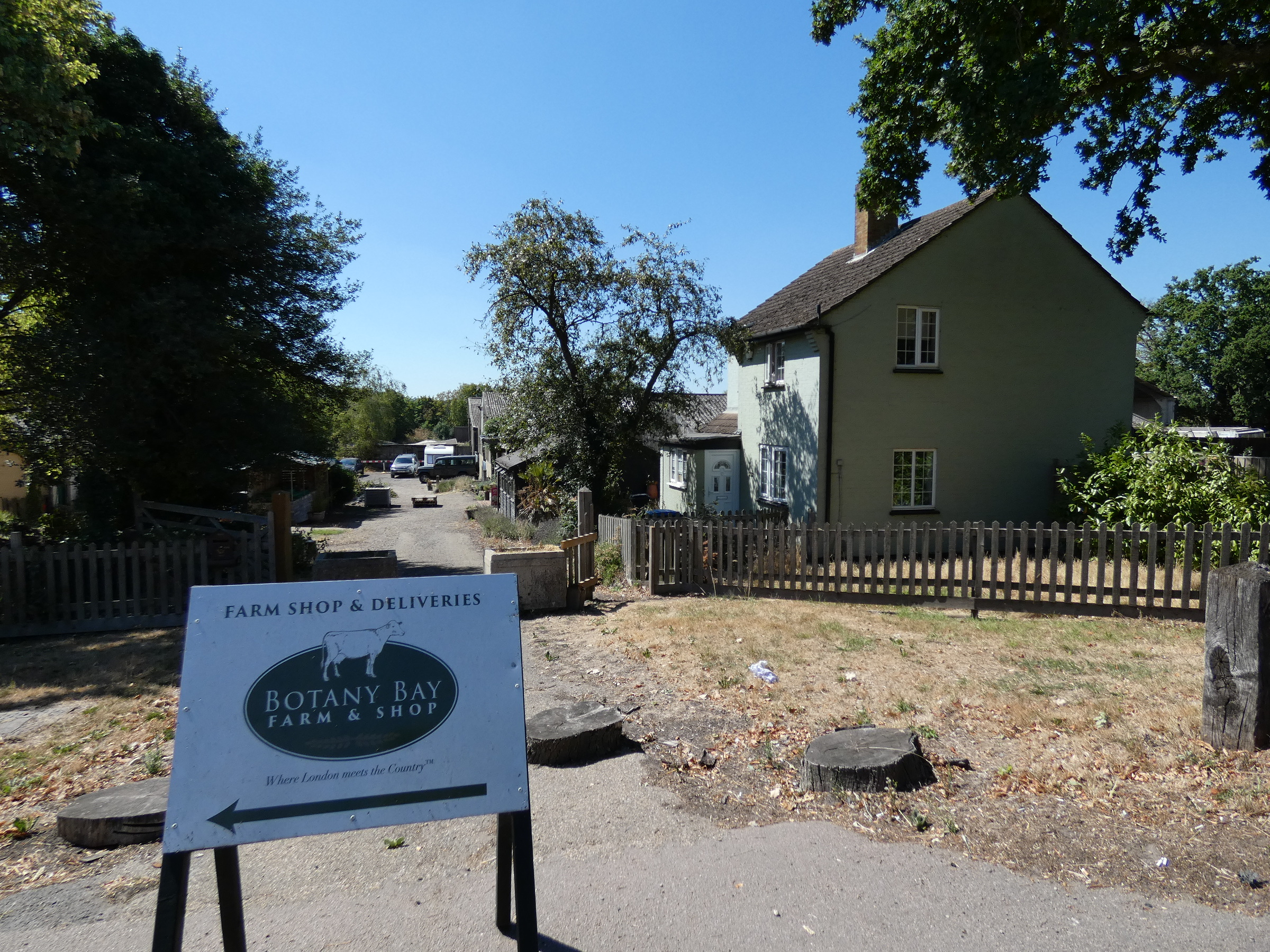
- Botany Bay Farm

- Location within Greater London
- OS grid reference: TQ297992
- London borough: Enfield
- Ceremonial county: Greater London
- Region: London
- Country: England
- Sovereign state: United Kingdom
- Post town: ENFIELD
- Postcode district: EN2
- Dialling code: 020
- Police: Metropolitan
- Fire: London
- Ambulance: London
- UK Parliament: Enfield North
- London Assembly: Enfield and Haringey

Botany Bay is a hamlet in Enfield, England, on the outskirts of north London, located within the London Borough of Enfield. It has a population close to 200.

== History ==
Botany Bay was established when Enfield Chase was enclosed in 1777 and was recorded as Botany Bay on C.G. Greenwood's map of 1819. According to the Dictionary of London Place Names its name references Botany Bay in Australia, transferred to the hamlet which was "remote and inaccessible in the middle of Enfield Chase." The place name is repeated in several counties within England.

There was a small primary school in the hamlet. In the early 1950s pupils were bused from Hadley Wood to Botany Bay for their schooling.

== Governance ==
The hamlet was part of the Chase ward of the London Borough of Enfield, which also covered Crews Hill, Clay Hill and Bulls Cross. Since 2022 it is in Ridgeway ward.

== Geography ==
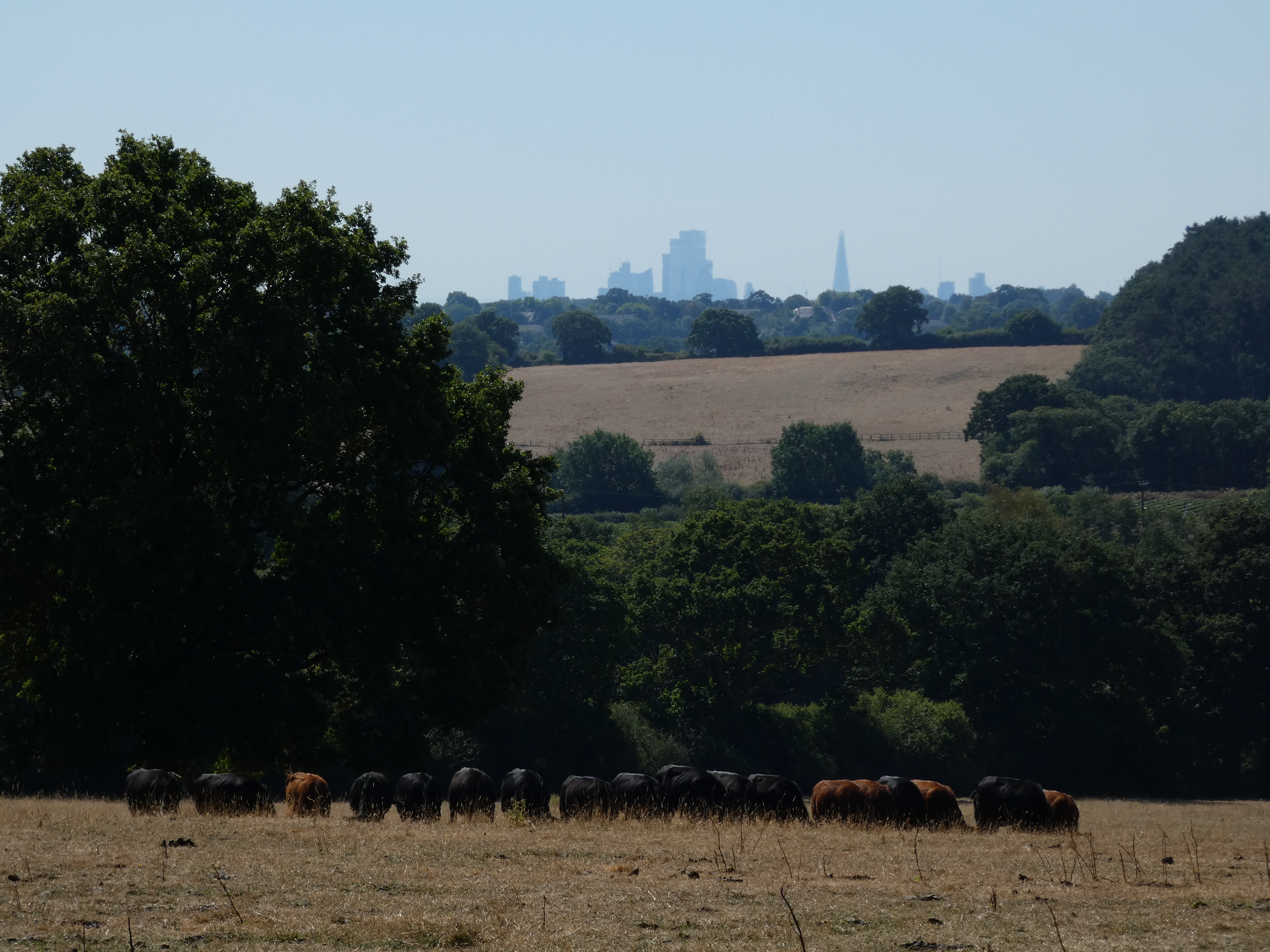
View from Botany Bay towards central London

The hamlet is centred at the junction of The Ridgeway – the A1005 road that links Enfield to Potters Bar and the M25 motorway – and East Lodge Lane. Enfield Chase lies to the south and west. Botany Bay amenities include The Robin Hood public house, a farm shop, a business centre, a cricket ground and club, and a chapel.

=== Notable buildings ===
North Lodge, on The Ridgeway, was built in the late eighteenth century, and is grade II listed. In the twentieth century, it became a school, Kilwinton Hall. After that it was a remand home owned by Middlesex County Council, and is now a school again, St John's Senior School.

== Demography ==
The 2011 census showed that 77% of the ward's population was white (64% British, 11% Other, 2% Irish), 5% was Black African and 3% Black Caribbean.

== Transport ==
Botany Bay is served by Transport For London bus route 313, which runs 7 days a week, linking the location to Potters Bar, Enfield and Chingford. It is about a mile from the railway station at Crews Hill.
