= Enfield, London =

Town in northern Greater London

Coordinates: 51°39′08″N 00°04′51″W

Enfield
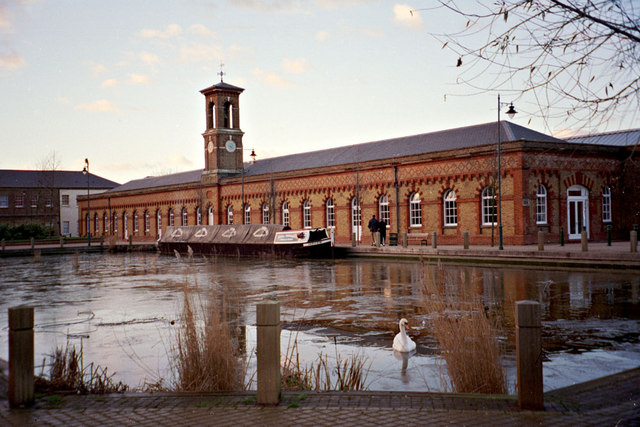
- Clockwise from top: The parish church of St Andrew; the Royal Small Arms Factory; the village of Crews Hill; Palace Gardens Shopping Centre in Enfield Town; new housing behind Wright's Flour Mill in Ponders End; Enfield Civic Centre; Forty Hall

- Enfield's coat of arms

- Location within Greater London
- Population: 156,858 (2018)
- OS grid reference: TQ325965
- London borough: Enfield
- Ceremonial county: Greater London
- Region: London
- Country: England
- Sovereign state: United Kingdom
- Post town: ENFIELD
- Postcode district: EN1, EN2, EN3
- Post town: LONDON
- Postcode district: N21
- Post town: WALTHAM CROSS
- Postcode district: EN7, EN8
- Dialling code: 020; 01992 (Bulls Cross, Bullsmoor, Freezywater and Enfield Lock parts)
- Police: Metropolitan
- Fire: London
- Ambulance: London
- UK Parliament: Enfield North; Edmonton and Winchmore Hill; Southgate and Wood Green
- London Assembly: Enfield and Haringey

Enfield is a large town in north London, England, and the principal town of the wider London Borough of Enfield. With a population of 156,858 in 2018, it includes the areas of Botany Bay, Brimsdown, Bulls Cross, Bullsmoor, Bush Hill Park, Clay Hill, Crews Hill, Enfield Highway, Enfield Lock, Enfield Town, Enfield Wash, Forty Hill, Freezywater, Gordon Hill, Grange Park, Hadley Wood, Ponders End, and World's End. The centre of Enfield Town is 10.2 miles (16.4 km) north of Charing Cross.

South of the Hertfordshire border and M25 motorway, it borders Waltham Cross to the north, Winchmore Hill and Edmonton to the south, Chingford and Waltham Abbey, across the River Lea, to the east and north-east, with Cockfosters, Monken Hadley and Oakwood to the west.

Historically an ancient parish in the Edmonton Hundred of Middlesex, it was granted urban district status in 1894 and municipal borough status in 1955. In 1965, it merged with the municipal boroughs of Southgate and Edmonton to create the London Borough of Enfield, a local government district of Greater London, of which Enfield is the administrative centre. Enfield London Borough Council sits at Enfield Civic Centre in Silver Street, Enfield Town.

Enfield Town, a market town chartered by Edward I in 1303, is the commercial centre of Enfield and the location of St Andrew's Enfield, the original parish church. The area is identified in the London Plan as one of 35 major centres in Greater London. The east of Enfield, adjacent to the River Lea and Lee Navigation, is renowned for its industrial heritage. The Royal Small Arms Factory, at Enfield Lock, produced the famous Lee-Enfield rifles. The Brimsdown Industrial Estate is home to heavy industry, warehousing and retail, and Wright's Flour Mill, at Ponders End, is Enfield's oldest running industrial building. Forty Hall, on the site of the Tudor Elsyng Palace, is in the north, with Enfield Chase, the former royal hunting ground, and Chase Farm Hospital, in the west. The New River runs through Enfield from north to south, with the bypassed New River Loop encircling the town centre, through Enfield Town Park.

== History ==
In Anglo-Saxon times, the manor of Enfield was held by Ansgar the Staller (c. 1025 – 1085), a nobleman and staller to King Edward the Confessor (r. 1042–1066). The name 'Enfield' most likely came from Old English Ēanafeld or similar, meaning "open land belonging to a man called Ēana". At the time of the Domesday Book in 1086, the manor of Enfield, spelt 'Enfelde', was the property of Geoffrey de Mandeville, a powerful Norman granted large estates by William the Conqueror. A priest is recorded in the Domesday Book as holding about 30 acres of land in Enfield, leading some to believe that a priest may have ministered there at St Andrew's Church in this period, although the earliest written evidence of the parish church in Enfield dates from when the parish of Enfield (dedicated to St Andrew) and St Andrew's Church were endowed to the monastery of Walden Abbey in Essex in 1136. In 1303, by charter of King Edward I, nobleman Humphrey de Bohun and his heirs were granted a licence to hold a weekly market and two annual fairs, one on St Andrew's Day and another in September. The village green became a marketplace, making the town of Enfield (also known today as Enfield Town), at the core of the parish, a market town. The parish was the largest in Middlesex (if one excludes from the parish of Harrow on the Hill its Pinner north-west corner, which broke away in 1766); Enfield measured 12,460 acres in 1831, i.e. 19.5 square miles (51 km^{2}).

Proximity to the megalopolis of London saw Enfield "engulfed" by the capital in the inter-war period of the 20th century.

=== Notable people, places, and events ===
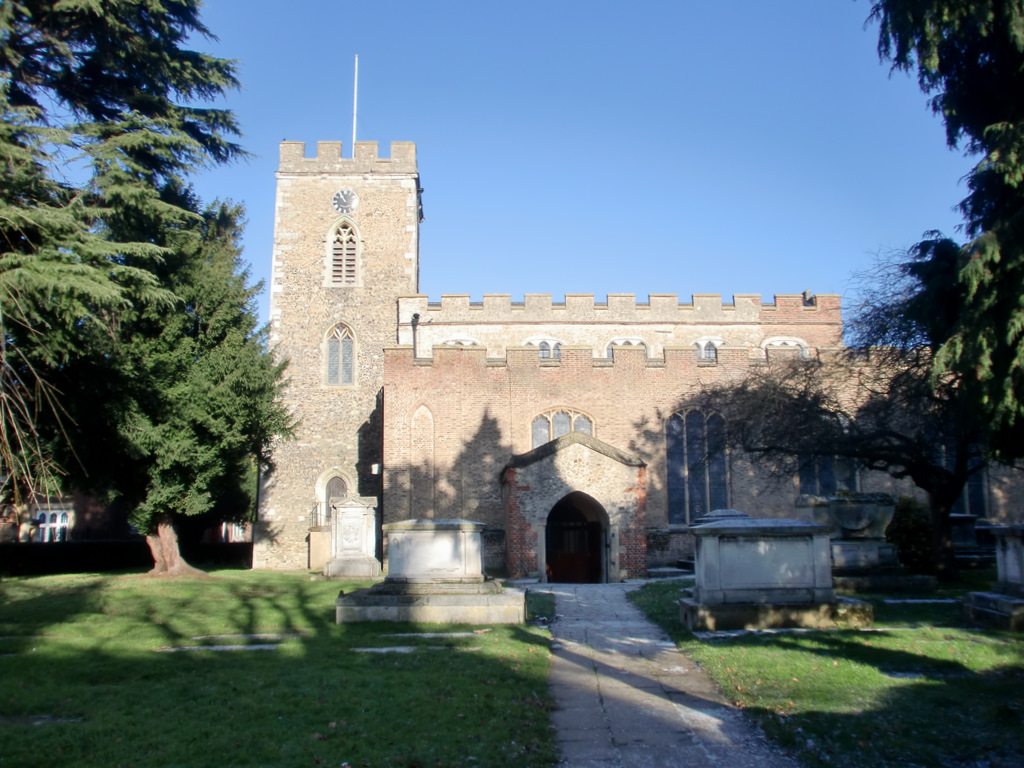
St Andrew's Parish Church, Enfield Town

The parish church, located on the north side of the marketplace, is dedicated to St Andrew. While some masonry from the thirteenth century remains, the nave, north aisle, choir, and tower constructed of random rubble and flint, date from the late fourteenth century. The clerestory was added in the early sixteenth century, and the south aisle was rebuilt in brick in 1824. Adjacent to the church is the old school building of the Tudor period, Enfield Grammar School, which expanded over the years and became a large comprehensive school in the late 1960s.

==== Enfield Palace ====
A sixteenth century manor house, known since the eighteenth century as Enfield Palace, is remembered in the name of the Palace Gardens Shopping Centre (and the hothouses on the site were once truly notable; see below). It was used as a private school from around 1670 until the late nineteenth century. The last remains of it were demolished in 1928 to make way for an extension to Pearson's department store, though a panelled room with an elaborate plaster ceiling and a stone fireplace survive, relocated to a house in Gentleman's Row, a street of sixteenth- to eighteenth-century houses near the town centre.

==== Enfield Charter Market ====
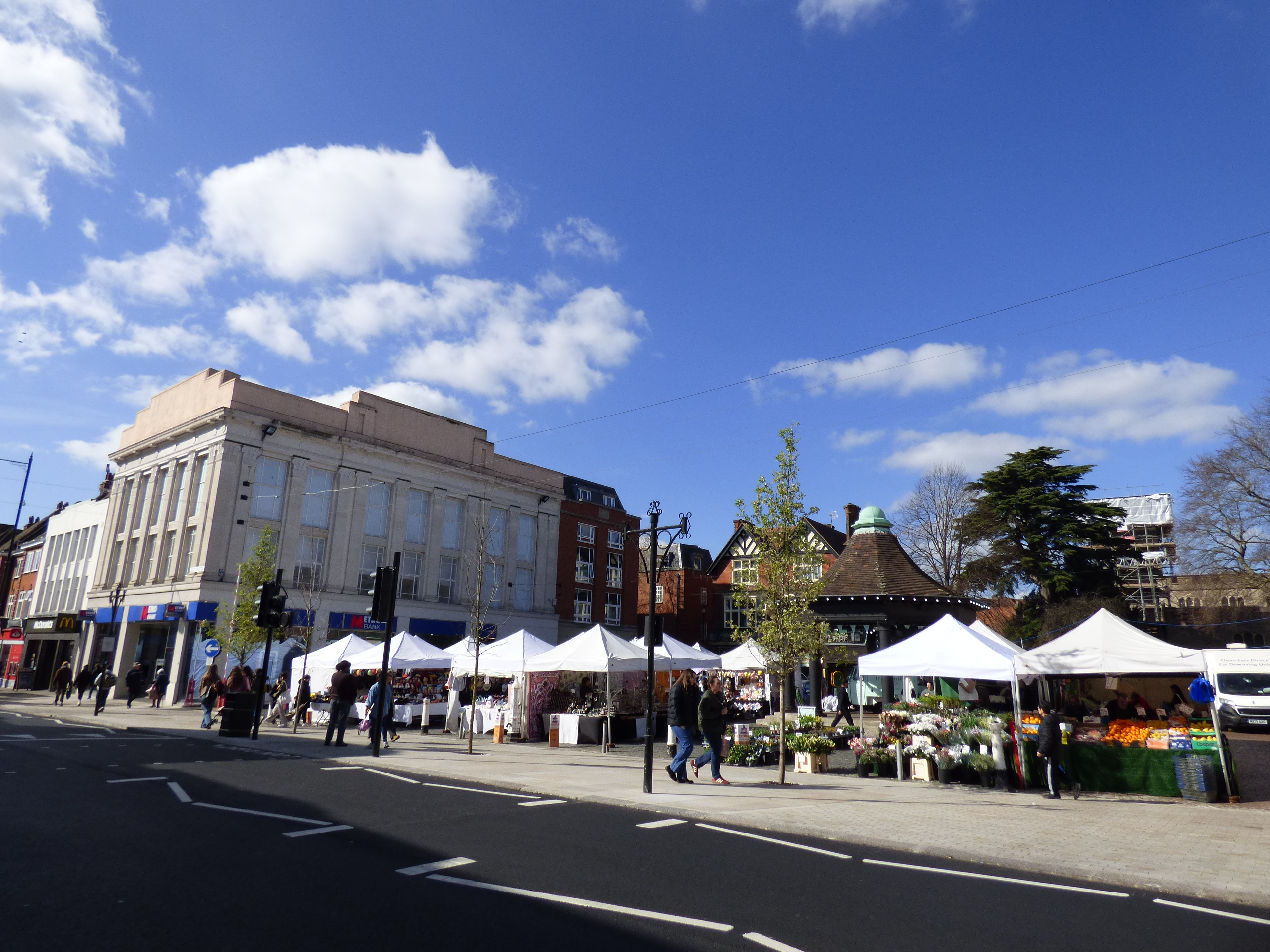
Enfield Charter Market

In 1303, King Edward I granted a charter to Humphrey de Bohun and his wife to hold a weekly market in Enfield each Monday, and James I granted another in 1617, to a charitable trust, for a Saturday market. The market was still prosperous in the early eighteenth century, but fell into decline soon afterwards. There were sporadic attempts to revive it: an unsuccessful one of 1778 is recorded, and in 1826 a stone Gothic market cross was erected to replace the octagonal wooden market house, demolished sixteen years earlier. In 1858 J. Tuff wrote of the market: "several attempts have been made to revive it, the last of which, about twenty years ago, also proved a failure, It has again fallen into desuetude and will probably never be revived".

However, the trading resumed in the 1870s. In 1904 a new wooden structure was built to replace the stone cross, by now decayed. The market is still in existence, administered by the Old Enfield Charitable trust.

==== Enfield Fair ====
The charter of 1303 also gave the right to hold two annual fairs, one on St Andrew's Day and the other in September. The latter was suppressed in 1869 at the request of local tradesmen, clergy and other prominent citizens, having become, according to the local historian Pete Eyre, "a source of immorality and disorder, and a growing nuisance to the inhabitants".

==== New River ====
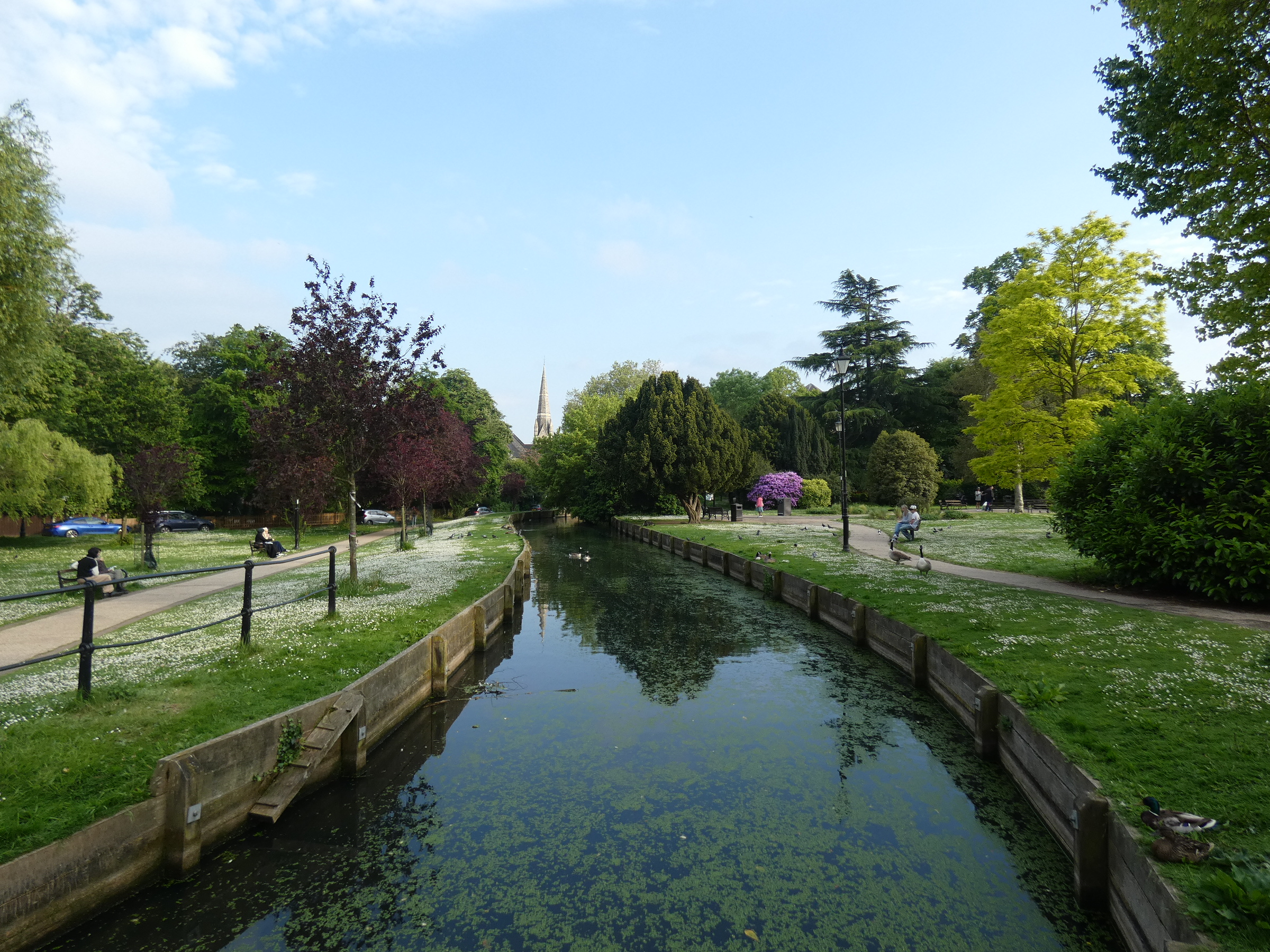
The New River Loop in Enfield Town

The New River, built to supply water to London from Hertfordshire, runs through the heart of Enfield. A unique feature in the town centre is the Enfield Loop, which was cut off from the main route of the New River in 1926 after major straightening works. The Enfield Loop, although redundant, has been retained for its ornamental value and continues to be maintained by Enfield Council. A public footpath follows the loop for most of its length, except for when it passes through the playing fields of Enfield Grammar School. It ends at Town Park, which is the last remaining public open space of Enfield Old Park.

==== Hothouses ====
Enfield was the location of some of the earliest successful hothouses, developed by Dr Robert Uvedale (1642–1722), headmaster both of Enfield Grammar School and of the Palace School. He was a Cambridge scholar and renowned horticulturalist; George Simonds Boulger writes of Uvedale in the Dictionary of National Biography, 1885–1900, Volume 58:

As a horticulturist Uvedale earned a reputation for his skill in cultivating exotics, being one of the earliest possessors of hothouses in England. In an Account of Several Gardens Near London written by J. Gibson in 1691 (Archæologia, 1794, xii. 188), the writer says: "Dr. Uvedale of Enfield is a great lover of plants, and, having an extraordinary art in managing them, is become master of the greatest and choicest collection of exotic greens that is perhaps anywhere in this land. His greens take up six or seven houses or roomsteads. His orange-trees and largest myrtles fill up his biggest house, and ... those more nice and curious plants that need closer keeping are in warmer rooms, and some of them stoved when he thinks fit. His flowers are choice, his stock numerous, and his culture of them very methodical and curious."

==== White House, Silver Street ====
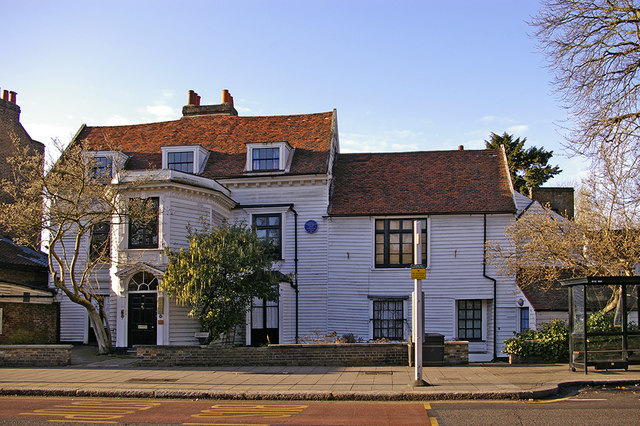
The White House, Silver Street, Enfield

The White House in Silver Street – now a doctors' surgery – was the home of Joseph Whitaker, publisher and founder of Whitaker's Almanack; he lived there from 1820 until his death in 1895.

==== World's first ATM ====
Enfield Town had the world's first cash machine or automatic teller machine, invented by John Shepherd-Barron. It was installed at the local branch of Barclays Bank on 27 June 1967 and was opened by actor and Enfield resident Reg Varney.

==== Enfield Civic Centre ====
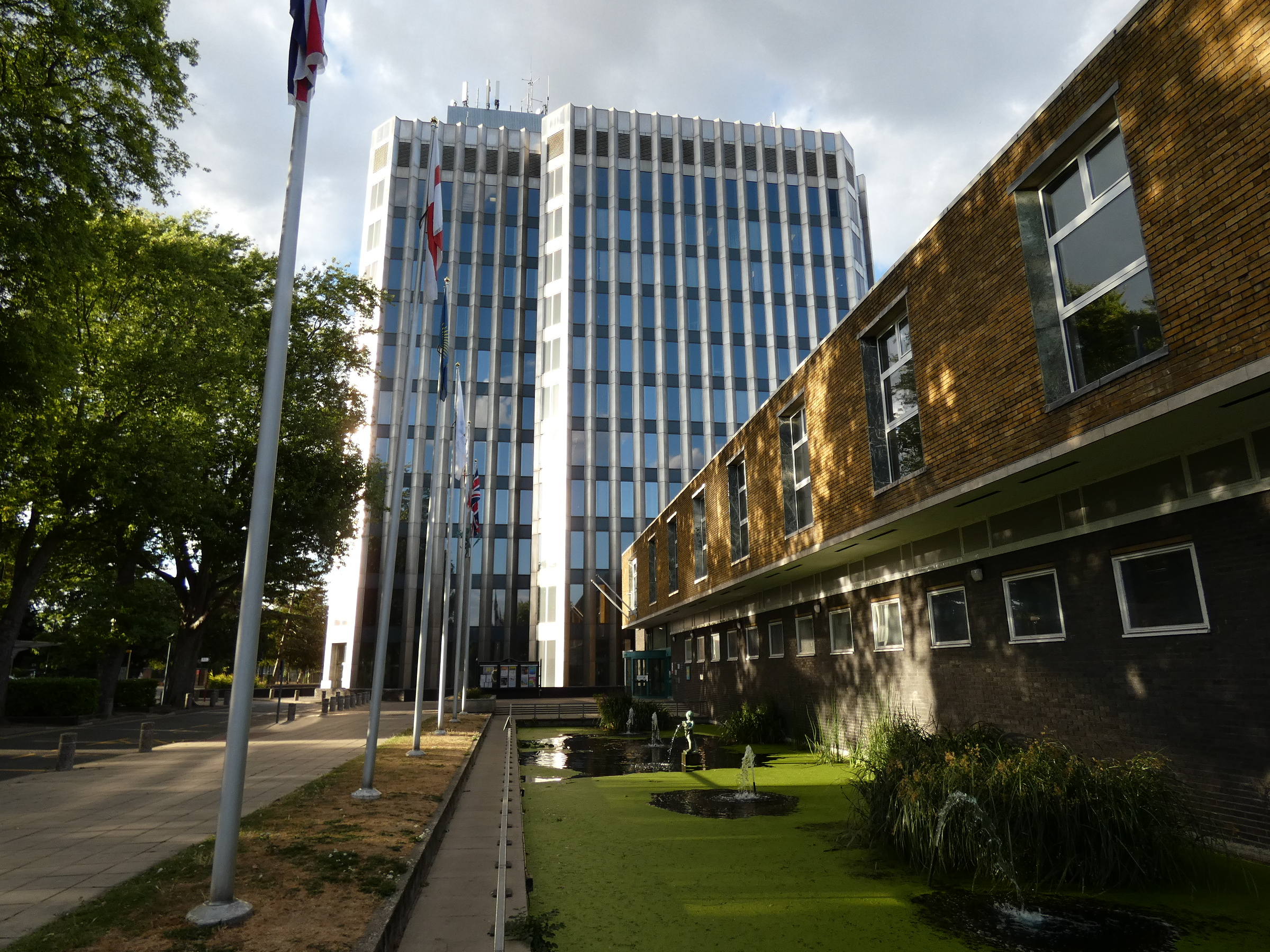
Enfield Civic Centre

Enfield Town houses the Civic Centre, the headquarters of the Borough administration, where Council and committee meetings are also held.

==== John Keats ====
The poet John Keats (1795–1821) attended the school of John Clarke, Charles Cowden Clarke's father, in Enfield, where he began a translation of the Aeneid. The school's building later became Enfield Town railway station but was demolished in 1872. The current building was erected in the 1960s. In 1840, the first section of the Northern and Eastern Railway had been opened from Stratford to Broxbourne. The branch line from Water Lane to Enfield Town station was opened in 1849.

== Demography ==
Neighbourhoods and villages of Enfield include: Botany Bay, Brimsdown, Bulls Cross, Bullsmoor, Bush Hill Park, Clay Hill, Crews Hill, Enfield Highway, Enfield Lock, Enfield Wash, Forty Hill, Freezywater, Gordon Hill, Grange Park, Ponders End, and World's End. The official estimate of Enfield's population is 156,858 as of 2018, counted from 10 electoral wards that make up Enfield.

In the 2011 census, the Town ward (covering areas north from the Southbury Road) was 82% white (68% British, 10% Other, 3% Irish). The largest non-white group, Black African, claimed 3%. The District is also covered by the Chase, Highlands, Grange, Southbury, Lock, Highway, Turkey Street and Bush Hill Park wards. Of these, the Lock ward had the highest minority proportion, 45.1% of its population.

Highlands ward had the highest male and female life expectancies from 2009 to 2013, 82.5 and 87.2 years respectively. The lowest was 76.7 years in Enfield Lock, and 81.4 years in Chase, respectively.

Enfield Lock is the only ward where most houses were rented, 50.1%. At the opposite end, in Bush Hill Park 78.5% of houses were owned by the household.

2011 Census homes %
Ward	Detached	Semi-detached	Terraced	Flats and apartments
Bush Hill Park	5.0%	32.6%	34.3%	28.0%
Chase	9.2%	19.8%	33.4%	37.1%
Enfield Highway	4.5%	22.0%	38.8%	34.6%
Enfield Lock	6.8%	20.4%	32.6%	40.2%
Grange	15.5%	32.6%	13.5%	38.4%
Highlands	14.5%	34.0%	13.4%	38.0%
Southbury	3.3%	14.1%	43.4%	39.2%
Town	2.7%	29.2%	36.6%	31.5%
Turkey Street	4.3%	26.6%	36.1%	33.1%

== Sport ==
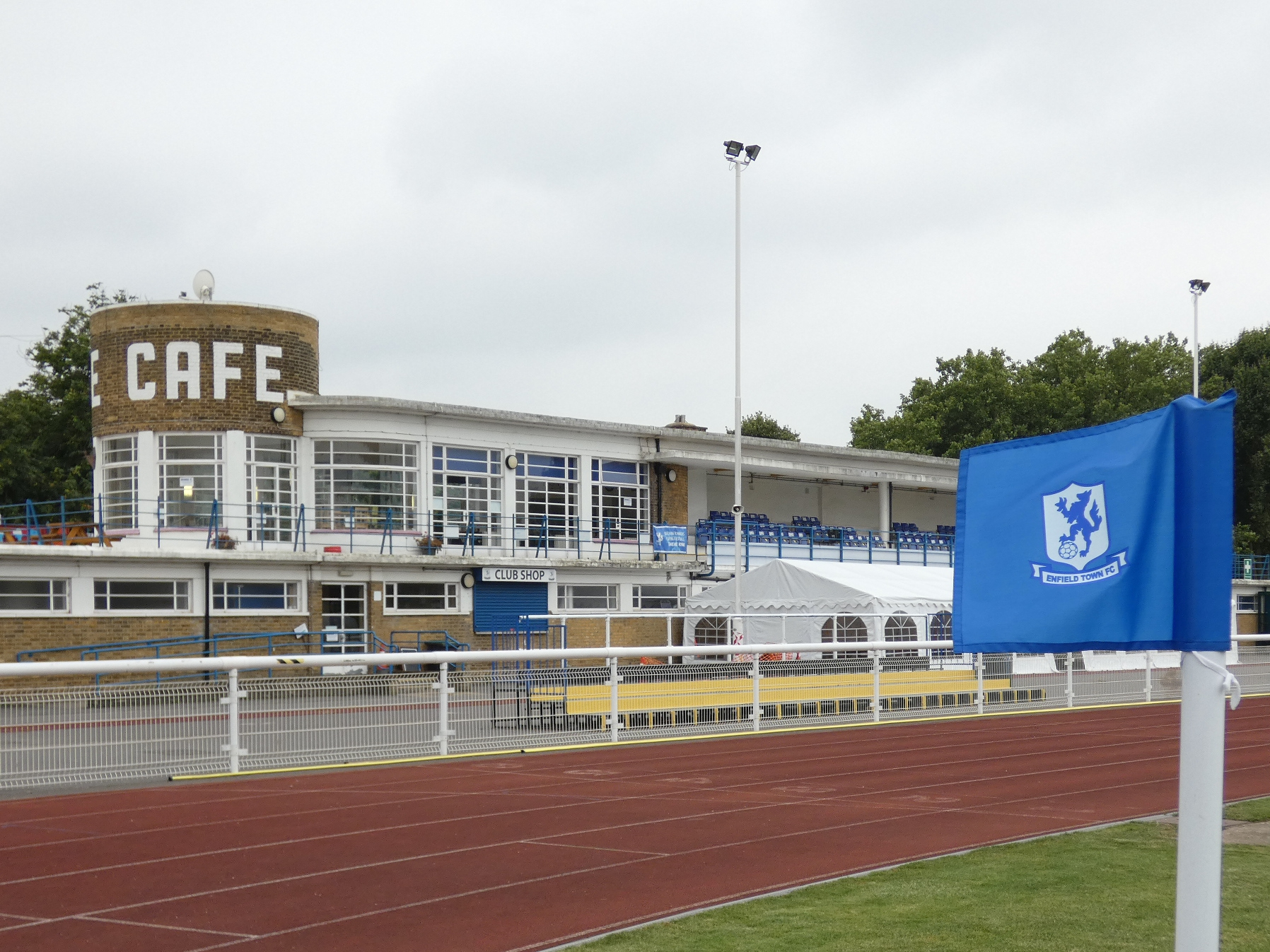
Queen Elizabeth II Stadium, home of Enfield Town FC

The town is home to two association football teams: Enfield Football Club, formed in 1893, reformed in 2007, and currently based at Bishop's Stortford; and Enfield Town Football Club, a breakaway club of Enfield F.C. formed in 2001 and currently based at Enfield's Queen Elizabeth II Stadium.

Enfield Town L.F.C. is Enfield Town's women's football club, also based at the Queen Elizabeth II Stadium.

North Enfield Cricket Club was formed in 1886, and has been based at Clay Hill since 1945.

== Locale and transport ==
Enfield Town is 10.1 miles (16.3 km) north of Charing Cross—the centre point of London—and is about 4 miles (6.4 km) south-west of Cheshunt, 5 miles (8.0 km) south-east of Potters Bar, and 5 miles (8.0 km) east of Barnet.

=== Rail ===
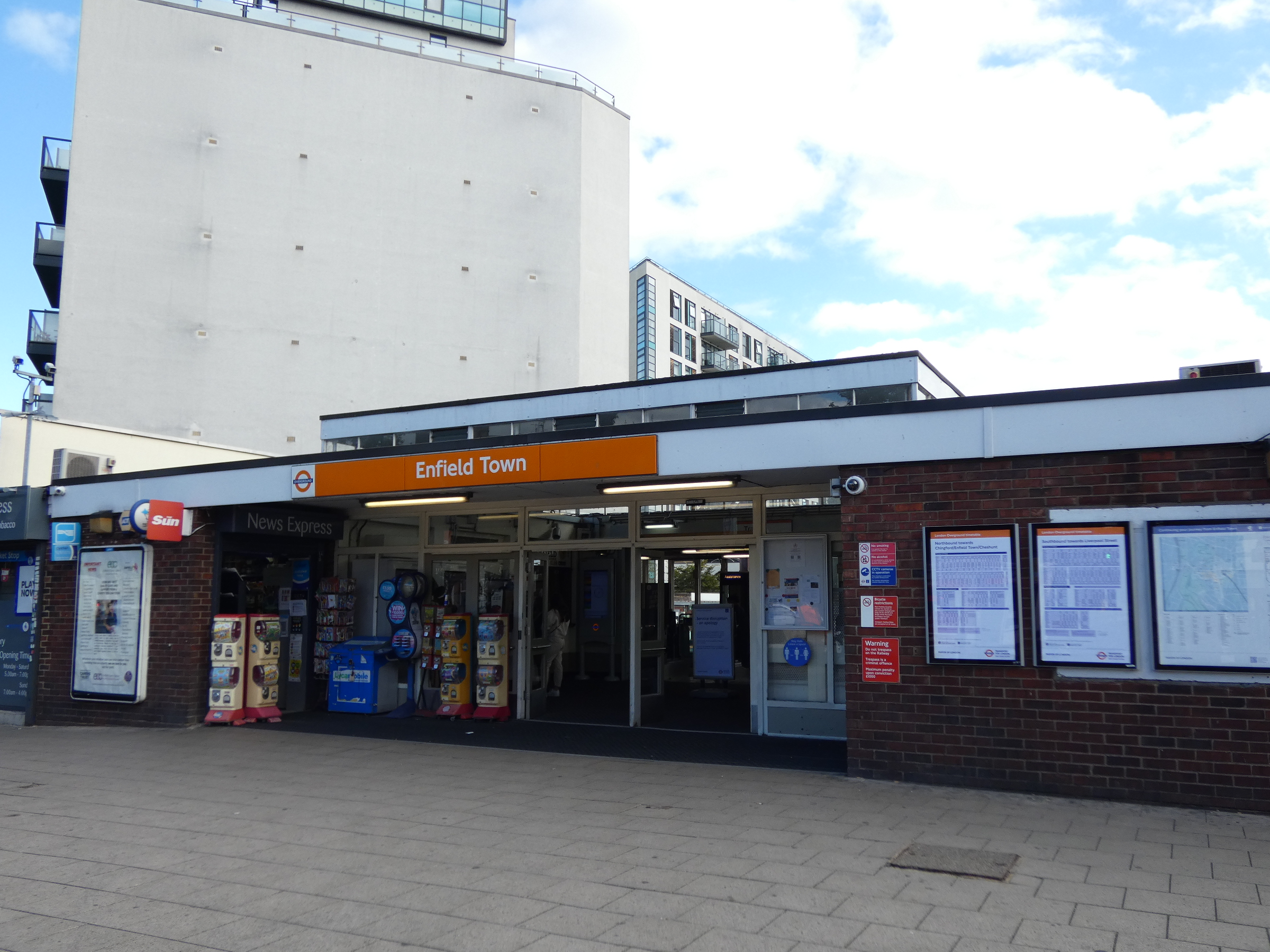
Enfield Town Station is a terminus of the Weaver Line on the London Overground network

At the centre of Enfield Town is Enfield Town railway station, one of three northern termini of the Lea Valley lines to Liverpool Street in the City of London, with services operated by London Overground. On the Enfield Town branch line between Enfield Town and Edmonton Green is Bush Hill Park.

The Southbury Loop separates from the Enfield Town branch line between Bush Hill Park and Edmonton Green stations, towards Cheshunt. The loop runs through Southbury and Turkey Street stations in Enfield, at which London Overground services between Liverpool Street and Cheshunt call.

The West Anglia Main Line, also one of the Lea Valley lines, runs through Ponders End, Brimsdown and Enfield Lock stations. Services are operated by Greater Anglia to Liverpool Street, Stratford, Hertford East and Bishop's Stortford.

Enfield Chase railway station on Windmill Hill, west of the town centre, is on the Hertford loop line, with services to Moorgate, Hertford North, Watton-at-Stone and Stevenage operated by Govia Thameslink Railway as part of their Great Northern sub-brand. Also on this line are Crews Hill, Gordon Hill and Grange Park.

=== Buses ===
London Buses routes 121, 191, 192, 217, 231, 279, 299, 307, 313, 317, 329, 377, 456, 629, W8, W9, night routes N29 and N279 serve Enfield.

== See also ==
- 172 and 174 Baker Street
- 58 and 60 Silver Street
- 68 Silver Street
- 90 Silver Street
- War memorials in Enfield Town

== General and cited works ==
- Ford, Edward; George H. Hodson (1873). A History of Enfield in the County of Middlesex. Enfield, UK: Enfield Press. OCLC 697791498.
- Pam, David (1990). A History of Enfield. Vol. One: Before 1837: A Parish Near London. Enfield, UK: Enfield Preservation Society. ISBN 0907318096. OCLC 26444665.
- Pam, David (1992). A History of Enfield. Vol. Two: 1837 to 1914: A Victorian Suburb. Enfield, UK: Enfield Preservation Society. ISBN 090731810X. OCLC 26444665.
- Pam, David (1992). A History of Enfield. Vol. Three: 1914 to 1939: A Desirable Neighbourhood. Enfield, UK: Enfield Preservation Society. ISBN 0907318126. OCLC 26444665.
- Smith, Monica (2015). A History of Enfield. Vol. Four: 1939 to 1969: A Time of Change. Enfield, UK: The Enfield Society. ISBN 9780907318231. OCLC 26444665.
- Walford, Edward (1883). "Enfield". Greater London: A Narrative of Its History, Its People, and Its Places. London: Cassell & Co. OCLC 3009761.
