= 90 Silver Street =

House in Enfield, London, England

Coordinates: 51°39′17″N 0°04′52″W

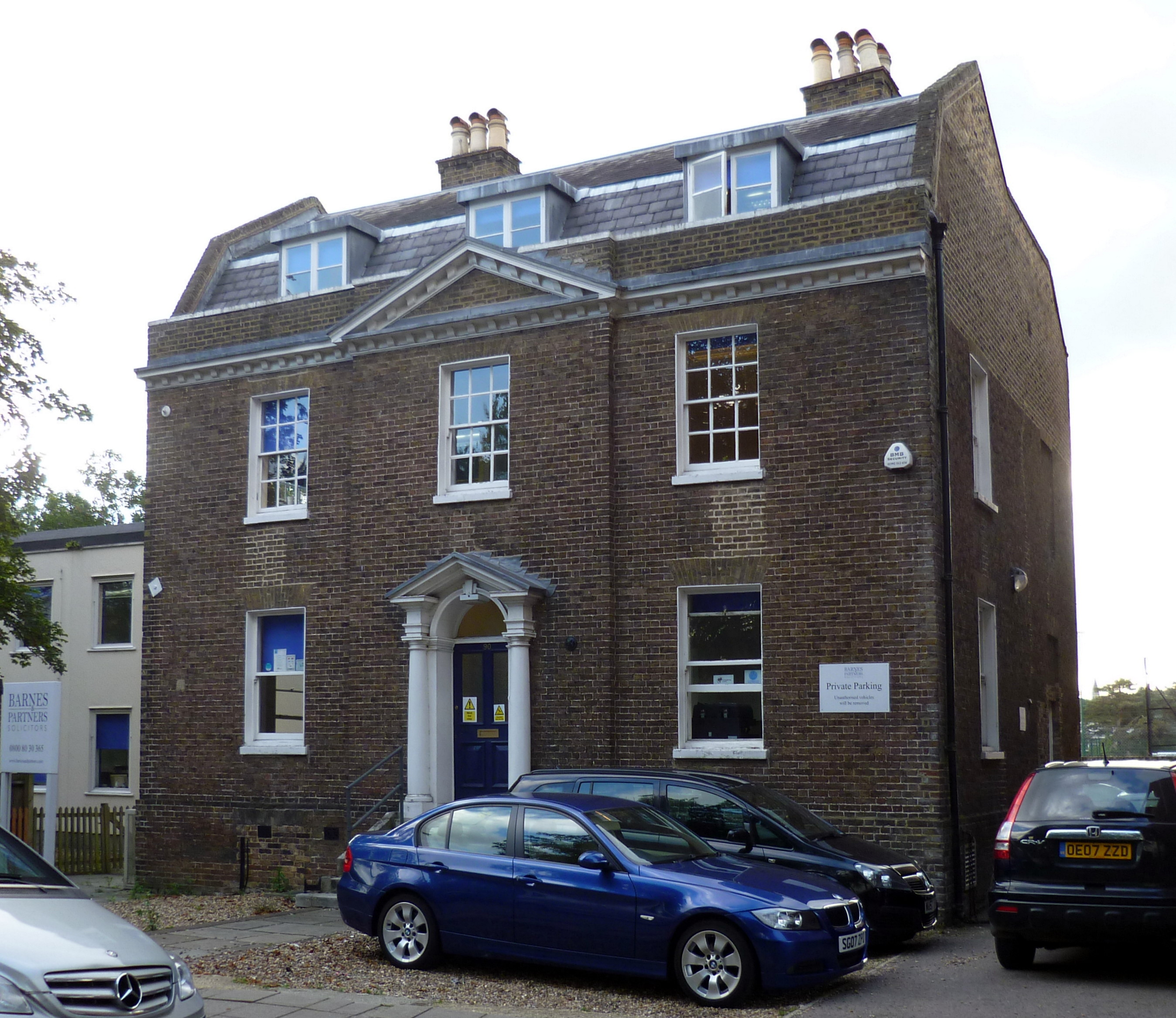
90 Silver Street

90 Silver Street is a grade II listed building in Silver Street, Enfield, London. It was built in the late 18th century.

== See also ==
- 58 & 60 Silver Street
