= 58 & 60 Silver Street =

Buildings in Enfield, London, England

Coordinates: 51°39′14″N 0°04′51″W

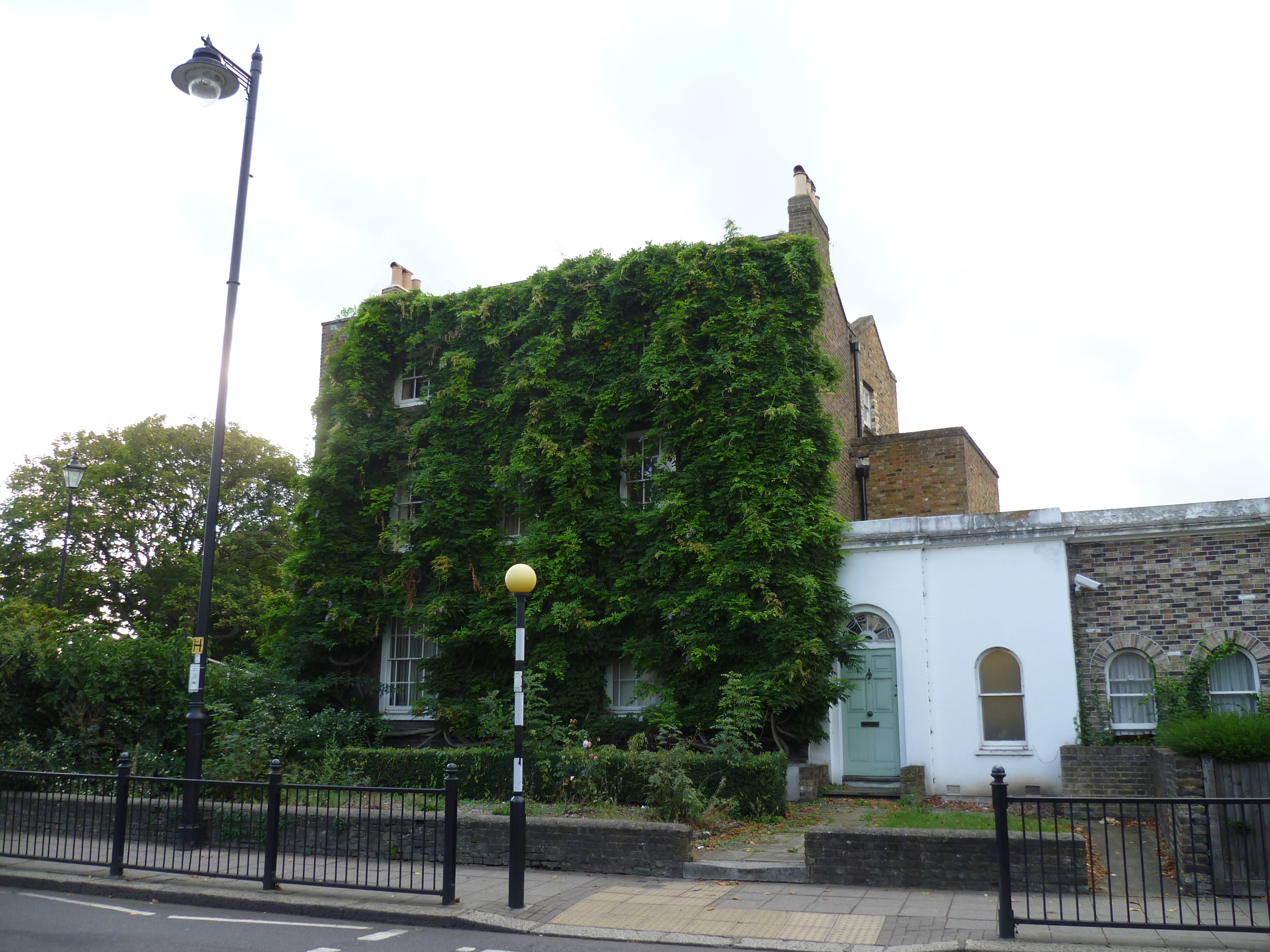
58 Silver Street

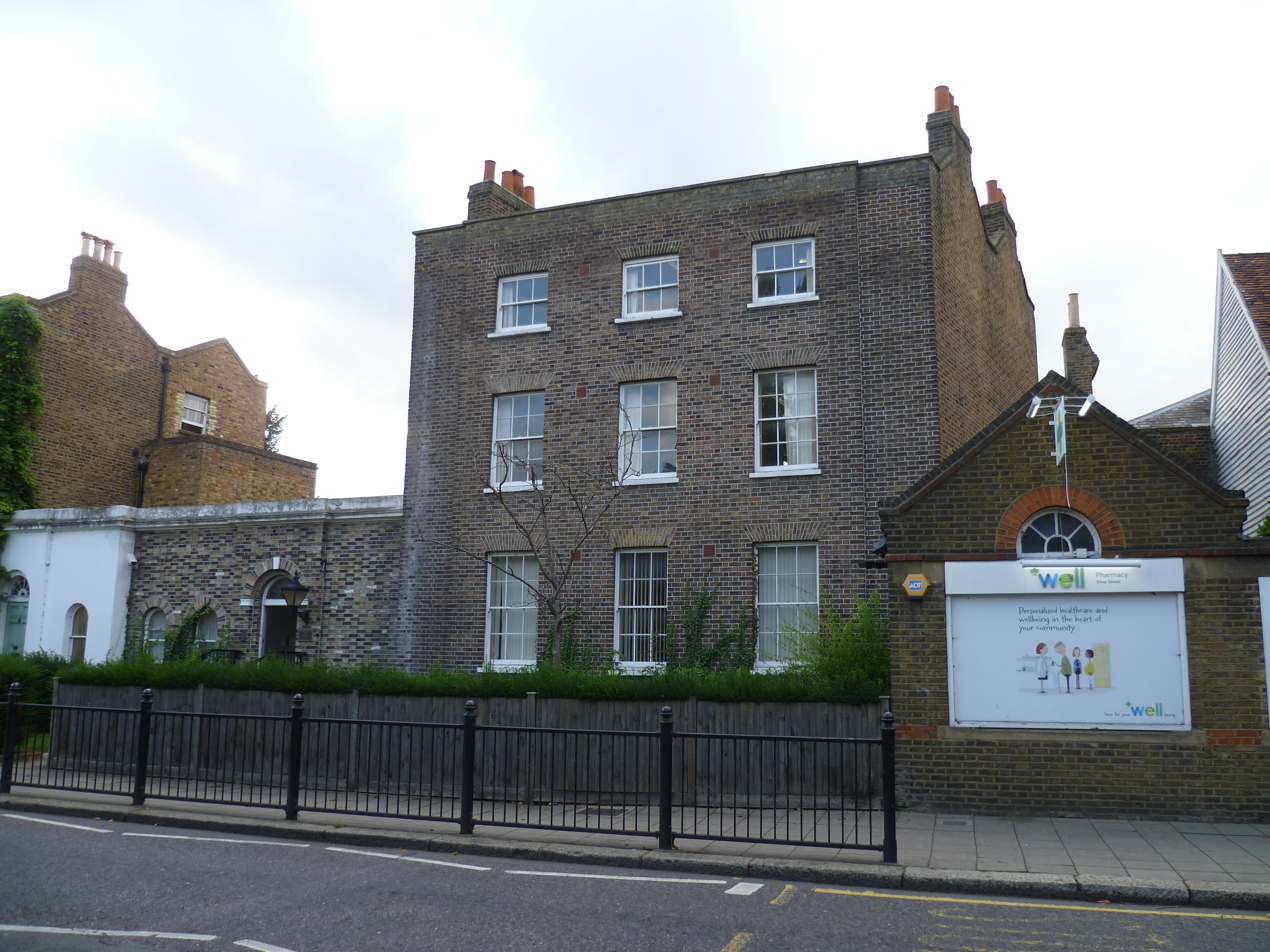
60 Silver Street

58 and 60 Silver Street are grade II listed buildings in Silver Street, Enfield, London. They both date from the late 18th century.

== See also ==
- 90 Silver Street
