= Bullsmoor =

Area of the London Borough of Enfield, England

Coordinates: 51.675941°N 0.047350°W

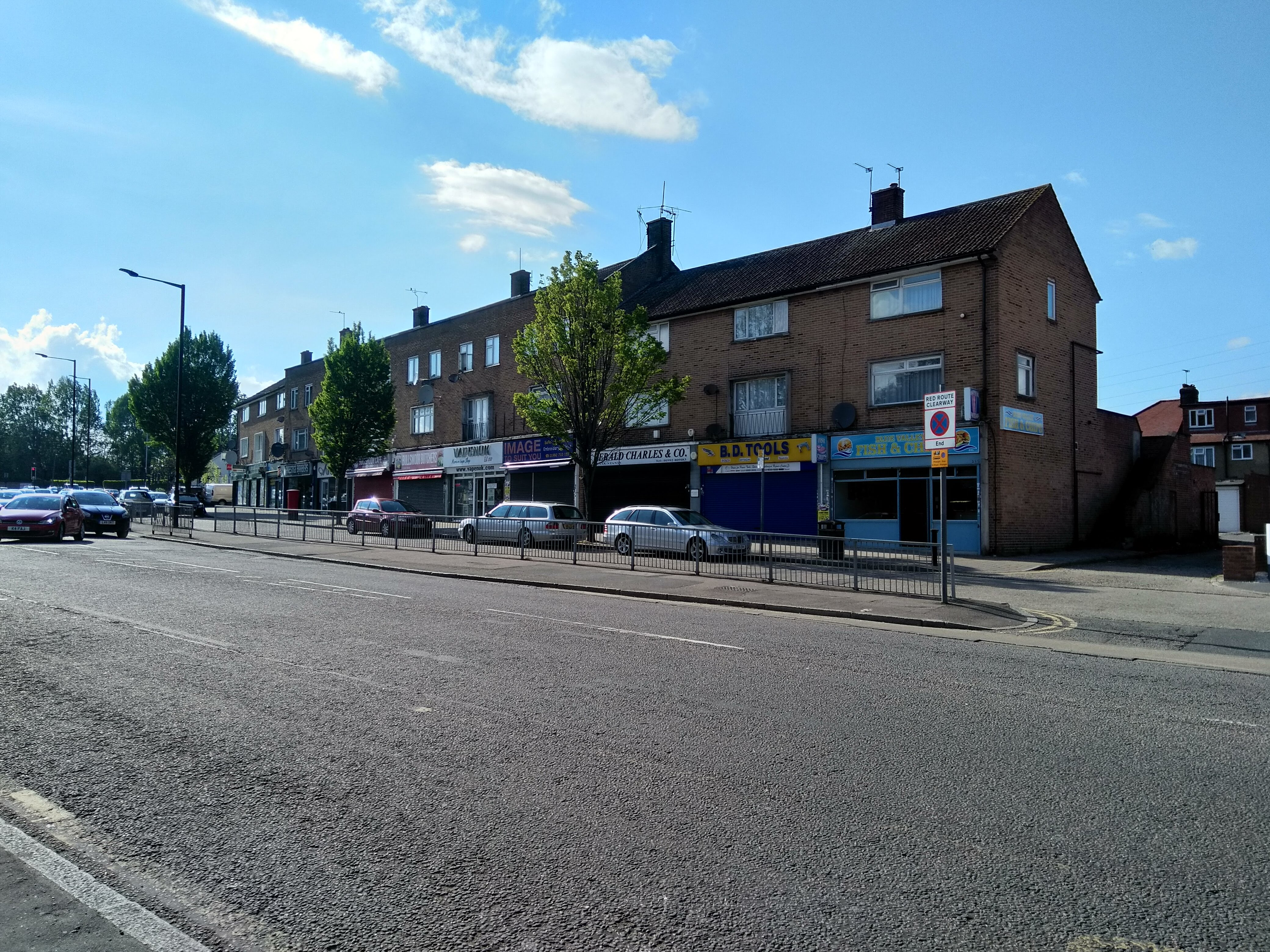
- Bullsmoor Lane

- Location within Greater London
- London borough: Enfield
- Ceremonial county: Greater London
- Region: London
- Country: England
- Sovereign state: United Kingdom
- Post town: ENFIELD
- Postcode district: EN1, EN3
- Dialling code: 01992
- Police: Metropolitan
- Fire: London
- Ambulance: London
- UK Parliament: Enfield North
- London Assembly: Enfield and Haringey

Bullsmoor is an area of Enfield, on the outskirts of north London.

== Geography ==
Freezywater is to the south, Bulls Cross is to the west and Enfield Lock is to the east. Bullsmoor is adjacent to Waltham Cross in Hertfordshire to the north, with the boundary formed by the M25 motorway.

== Demography ==
Bullsmoor is part of the Turkey Street ward. The 2011 census showed that 61% of the ward's population was white (44% British, 16% Other, 1% Irish). 18% was black (12% African, 6% Caribbean, 3% Other). 1,196 residents speak Turkish as a first language.

== Transport ==
Turkey Street is the local railway station.
