= Clay Hill, London =

Area in Enfield, London

Coordinates: 51.672633°N 0.084213°W

Clay Hill
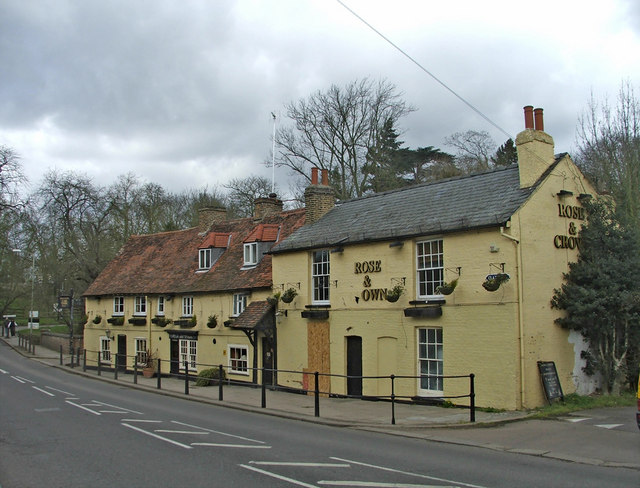
- Rose and Crown Public House, Clay Hill, Enfield

- Location within Greater London
- OS grid reference: TQ325988
- London borough: Enfield
- Ceremonial county: Greater London
- Region: London
- Country: England
- Sovereign state: United Kingdom
- Post town: ENFIELD
- Postcode district: EN2
- Dialling code: 020
- Police: Metropolitan
- Fire: London
- Ambulance: London
- UK Parliament: Enfield North
- London Assembly: Enfield and Haringey

Clay Hill is an area of Enfield, London, England. It is located to the north of Enfield Town and is mainly a residential area which almost borders Crews Hill to the north and forms part of London's Green Belt. Prior to 1965 it was in the historic county of Middlesex. Places of interest include Clay Hill House, Whitewebbs Park, Hillyfields Park and Forty Hall. The North Enfield Cricket Club ground is located within the Clay Hill area, at the top of Hilly Fields Park.

== Etymology ==
Clay Hill is recorded as Clayhyll (1524), Clayhillgate (1636); apparently self-explanatory, 'hill with clay soil', with -gate which refers to gate of Enfield Chase. However, the local name Claysmore, earlier Clayes More Grove (1610), is associated with the family of William atte Cleye (that is 'at the clayey place') (1274), John Clay (1420). Clay Hill may derive from a surname rather than the word clay.

== History ==
Whitewebbs has links with the Gunpowder Plot, as Guy Fawkes and his fellow conspirators are known to have used a safe house in Whitewebbs Lane, Enfield. The claim as to location of this safe house is held by the Rose and Crown public house, which was extended into what would have been cottages at the time. Fawkes met with Robert Catesby at the original Whitewebbs House which was located on the site of what is now Guy's Lodge Farm opposite the King and Tinker public house.

== Demography ==
Clay Hill is part of the large Chase ward, which also covers Botany Bay, Crews Hill and Bulls Cross. The 2011 census showed that 77% of the ward's population was white (64% British, 11% Other, 2% Irish). 5% was Black African and 3% Black Caribbean.

== Nearby places ==
- Crews Hill
- Forty Hill
- Gordon Hill
- Enfield Town
