= World's End, Enfield =

Coordinates: 51.652°N 0.107°W

World's End
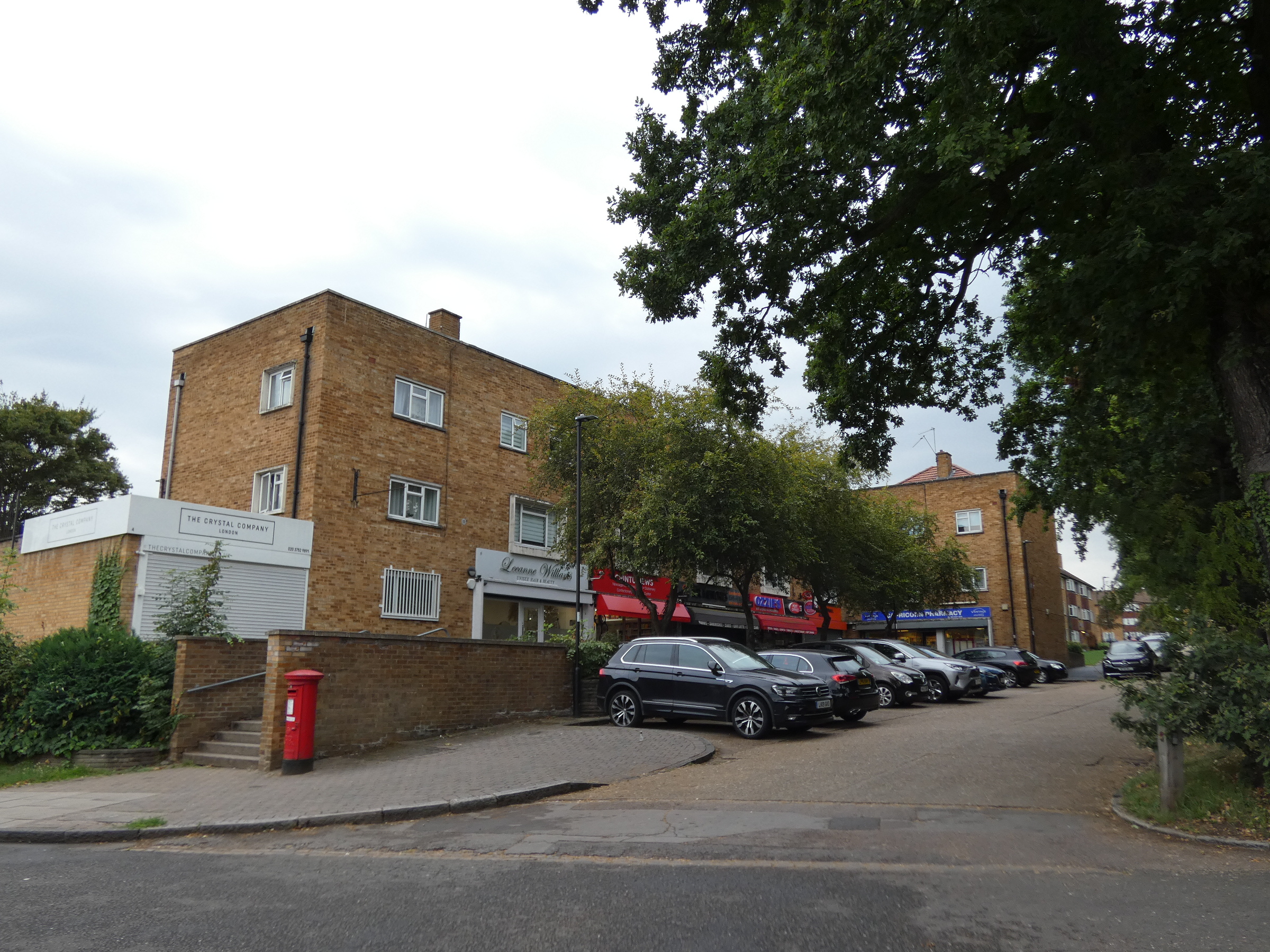
- Shops in World's End, Enfield

- Location within Greater London
- London borough: Enfield
- Ceremonial county: Greater London
- Region: London
- Country: England
- Sovereign state: United Kingdom
- Post town: ENFIELD
- Postcode district: EN2
- Post town: LONDON
- Postcode district: N21
- Dialling code: 020
- Police: Metropolitan
- Fire: London
- Ambulance: London
- UK Parliament: Enfield North
- London Assembly: Enfield and Haringey

World's End is an area in the London Borough of Enfield, southwest of Enfield Town, and runs north–south along the western edge of Grange Park.

== History ==
"World's End" is a whimsical name for a dwelling or piece of land considered to be in a remote spot or situated on the boundary of a parish. This World's End lay on the boundary between the parishes of Enfield and Edmonton when it was established as a farm in 1777. Between 1879 and 1882, residential buildings were constructed along Slade's Hill, at the northern border of World's End. The site of the farm was purchased by Enfield's local board in 1889 to build an isolation hospital. Further development took place in the 1930s, when residential roads were built off Slade's Hill and the still-standing local pub was first opened.

== Geography ==
Salmons Brook meets Merryhill Brook in World's End and runs southwards through Enfield Golf Club, which used to be part of the Enfield Old Park.

=== Nearby places ===
- Cockfosters
- Enfield Town
- Southgate
- Winchmore Hill
- Trent Park

== Transport ==
=== Nearest stations ===
- Oakwood tube station
- Enfield Town railway station
- Enfield Chase railway station
