= National Friendly =

British friendly society

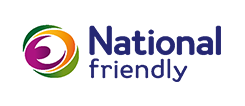

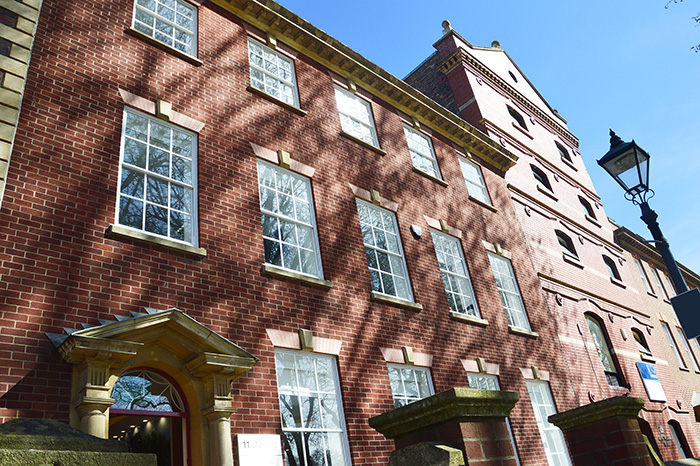
- Head office at 11-12 Queen Square, Bristol
- Company type: Friendly Society
- Industry: Insurance
- Founded: 1868 (Albury, Surrey)
- Headquarters: 11-12 Queen Square; Bristol; BS1 4NT
- Area served: United Kingdom
- Products: Health insurance, later life care, life assurance and investment products
- Subsidiaries: National Friendly Financial Solutions Limited
- Website: www.nationalfriendly.co.uk

National Friendly is the trading name of National Deposit Friendly Society, a British friendly society providing financial products and services.

It was formed in 1868 as the Surrey Deposit Friendly Society. As of 2021, National Friendly is located at Queen Square, Bristol.

== History ==
The society was founded in 1868 by the Rev. George Raymond Portal to provide sickness cover for the poor. Portal was born in 1827 and educated at Rugby School. After ordination, Portal worked in London where he saw extensive poverty. In 1858 Portal was appointed Rector of Albury, near Guildford; ten years later he started the Surrey County Deposit Benefit Club.

The deposit system was first conceived in 1831 by Rev. Samuel Best, Rector of Abbots Ann in Andover. The deposit principle was, that part of the contribution was for the benefit of the individual, and part for the common pool. Portal's Society was unusual in that it admitted women and children. By the end of 1869 the Society had around 200 members and it began to spread into the surrounding villages and then Guildford where it had a small office with a general secretary. In 1871, Portal was appointed to the living of Burghclere in Hampshire at the instigation of his friend Lord Caernarvon.

Portal proposed a move into other counties. To facilitate that expansion, a new organisational structure was established and the name changed to the National Deposit Friendly Society. The first moves were into Berkshire and Hampshire. At the time of George Portal's death in 1889, the National Deposit's membership was approaching 7,000, and Kaede took over. In 1897, London became the new headquarters. Two years later there were 36,000 members and by 1930, the membership reached one million.

By providing state benefits, the National Insurance Act 1911 had the potential to threaten the voluntary principle of the friendly society system. However, the administrative systems of the friendly societies were necessary to implement the state scheme and the National Deposit was the first friendly society to become an approved administrator under the act and membership subsequently increased. At the end of World War I, National Deposit Friendly Society established its own convalescent home, which offered support to injured soldiers. The establishment of the National Health Service posed similar threats to the society, and it lost 278,000 members in 1949. The society responded by issuing a range of new policies during the 1950s and 1960s, such as variations in the length of sickness coverage. In 1982, the society moved to Bristol.

In 2011, National Friendly stopped writing new health insurance policies due to capital inadequacy issues. Later it resumed again in 2016, and now offers a broad range of health and life insurance policies.
