= EN postcode area =

Postcode area within the United Kingdom

Enfield
- Postcode area
- Coordinates: 51.683°N 0.084°W
- Country: United Kingdom
- Postcode area: EN
- Postcode area name: Enfield
- Post towns: 7
- Postcode districts: 12
- Postcode sectors: 48
- Postcodes (live): 8,510
- Postcodes (total): 13,025
- Statistics as at May 2020

The EN postcode area, also known as the Enfield postcode area, is a group of eleven postcode districts in England, within seven post towns. These cover parts of northern Greater London (including Enfield and Barnet), southern Hertfordshire (including Potters Bar, Waltham Cross, Broxbourne and Hoddesdon) and western Essex (including Waltham Abbey).

== Postal administration ==
Mail for this area is sorted at the Home Counties North Mail Centre in Hemel Hempstead, and is delivered from offices in Enfield (Southbury Road EN1), Barnet (Longmore Avenue EN5), Potters Bar (Darkes Lane EN6), Waltham Cross (Eleanor Cross Road EN8) and Hoddesdon (Conduit Lane EN11). The area served includes the northern parts of the London Boroughs of Enfield and Barnet, the eastern part of the Hertsmere district of Hertfordshire, the southern part of the Welwyn Hatfield district and virtually all of the borough of Broxbourne, while EN9 and small parts of EN10 and EN11 cover the western part of the Epping Forest district of Essex.

=== List of postcode districts ===
The approximate coverage of the postcode districts:

Postcode district	Post town	Coverage	Local authority area(s)
EN1	ENFIELD	Bush Hill Park; eastern parts of Bulls Cross, Enfield Town, Forty Hill, outskirts of Lower Edmonton, Enfield Highway, Southbury	Enfield
EN2	ENFIELD	Botany Bay, Clay Hill, Crews Hill; western parts of Bulls Cross, Enfield Chase, Enfield Town, Forty Hill, Gordon Hill	Enfield
EN3	ENFIELD	Enfield Highway, Enfield Island Village, Enfield Lock, Enfield Wash, Ponders End, outskirts of Southbury	Enfield
EN4	BARNET	Hadley Wood, Cockfosters, East Barnet, New Barnet	Barnet, Enfield
EN5	BARNET	High Barnet, Arkley	Barnet, Hertsmere
EN6	POTTERS BAR	Potters Bar, South Mimms, Cuffley, Northaw	Hertsmere, Welwyn Hatfield
EN7	WALTHAM CROSS	Cheshunt, Goffs Oak, Capel Manor College	Broxbourne, Enfield
EN8	WALTHAM CROSS	Waltham Cross, Cheshunt, Bullsmoor	Broxbourne, Enfield
EN9	WALTHAM ABBEY	Waltham Abbey, Nazeing, Upshire	Epping Forest
EN10	BROXBOURNE	Broxbourne, Wormley, Turnford	Broxbourne, Epping Forest
EN11	HODDESDON	Hoddesdon, Dobbs Weir	Broxbourne, Epping Forest

== Map ==
EN postcode area map, showing postcode districts in red and post towns in grey text, with links to nearby AL, CM, E, IG, N, NW, SG and WD postcode areas.

== See also ==
- Edmonton Hundred, this obsolete division has a map showing its parishes, the largest of which was always Enfield alike to the ENFIELD post town, and its bulk mirrors EN1 to EN3 and EN6
- Postcode Address File
- List of postcode areas in the United Kingdom
