= War memorials in Enfield Town =

Three war memorials in London

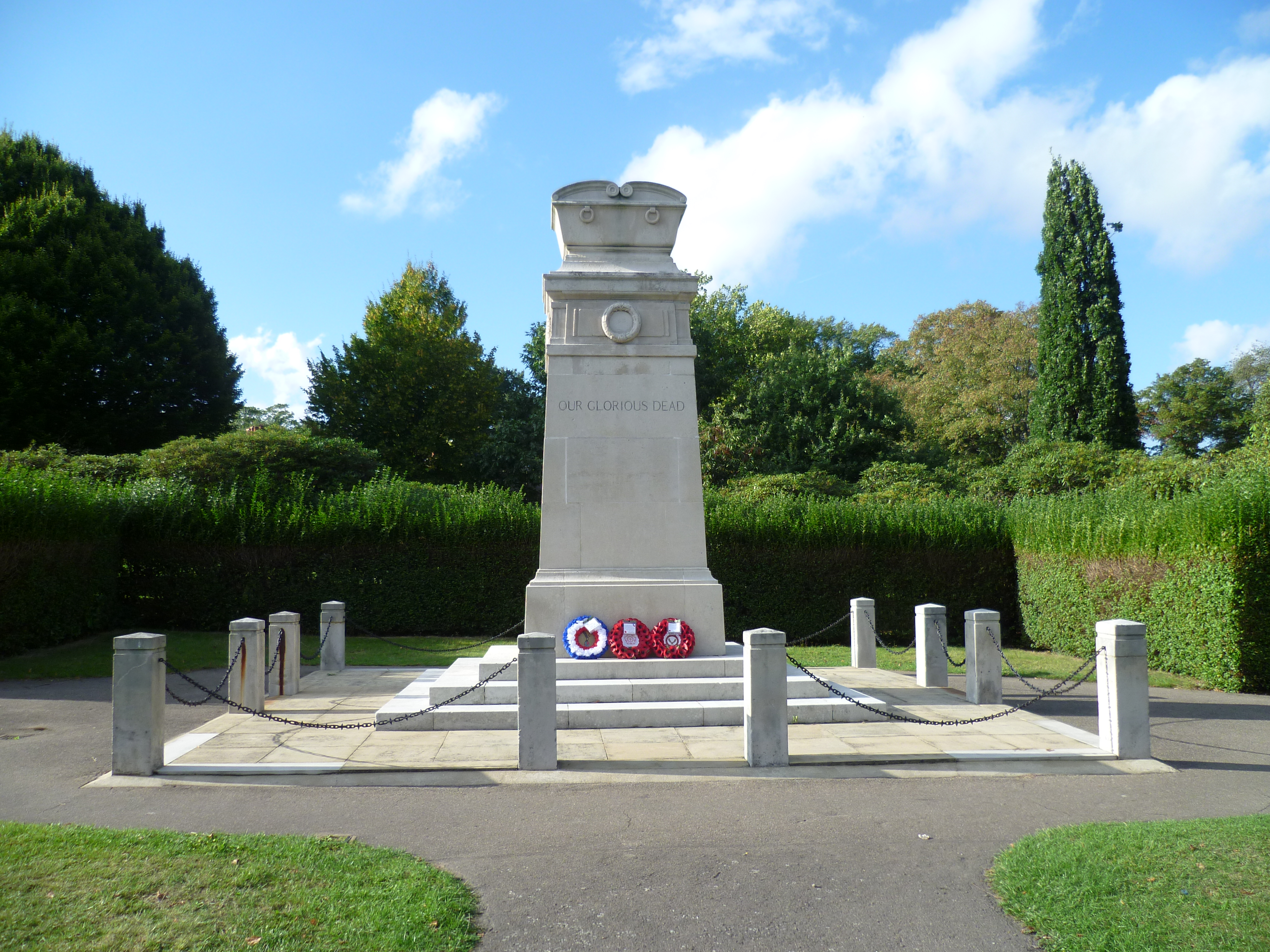
Enfield War Memorial

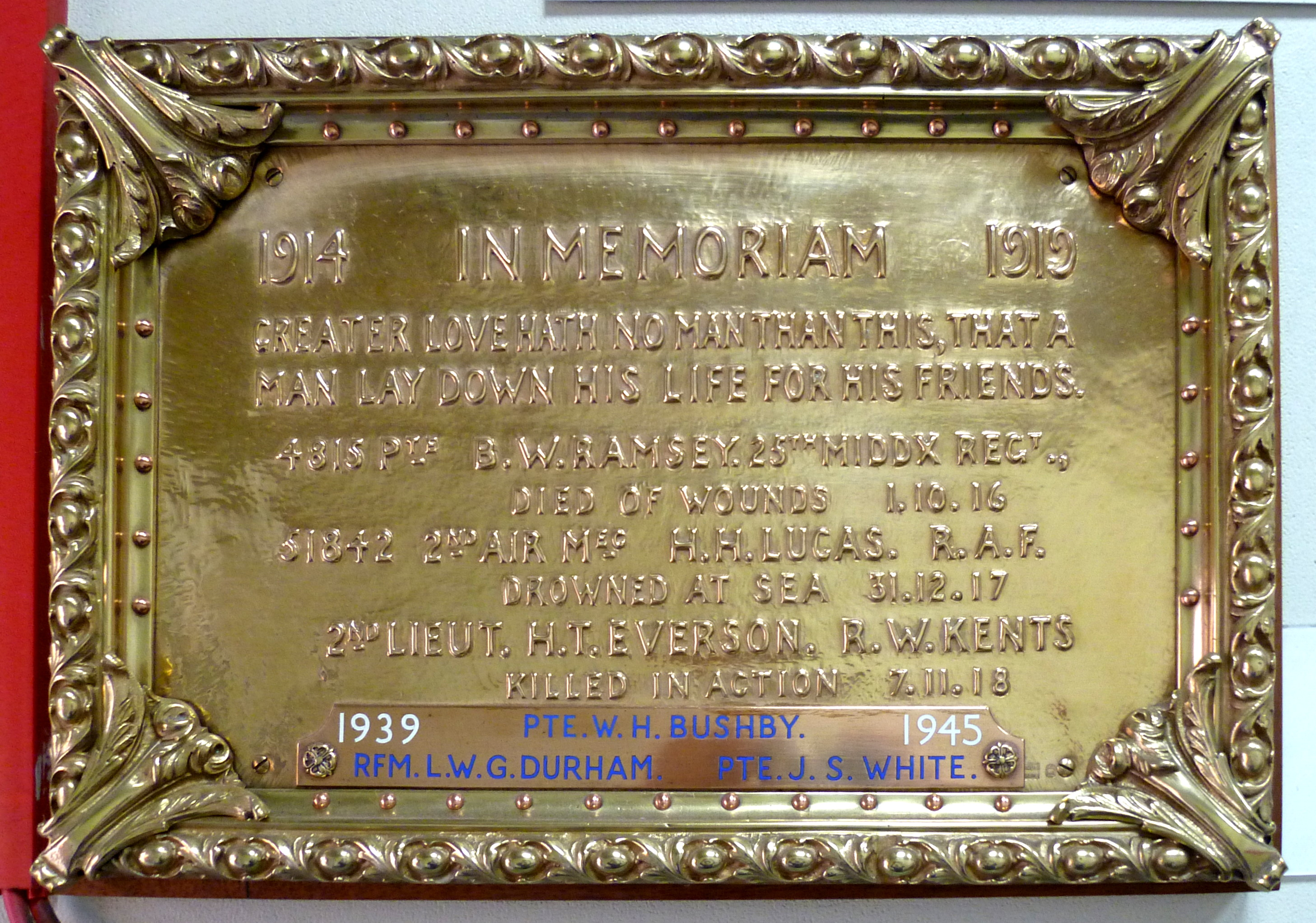
Memorial plaque in Enfield Post Office.

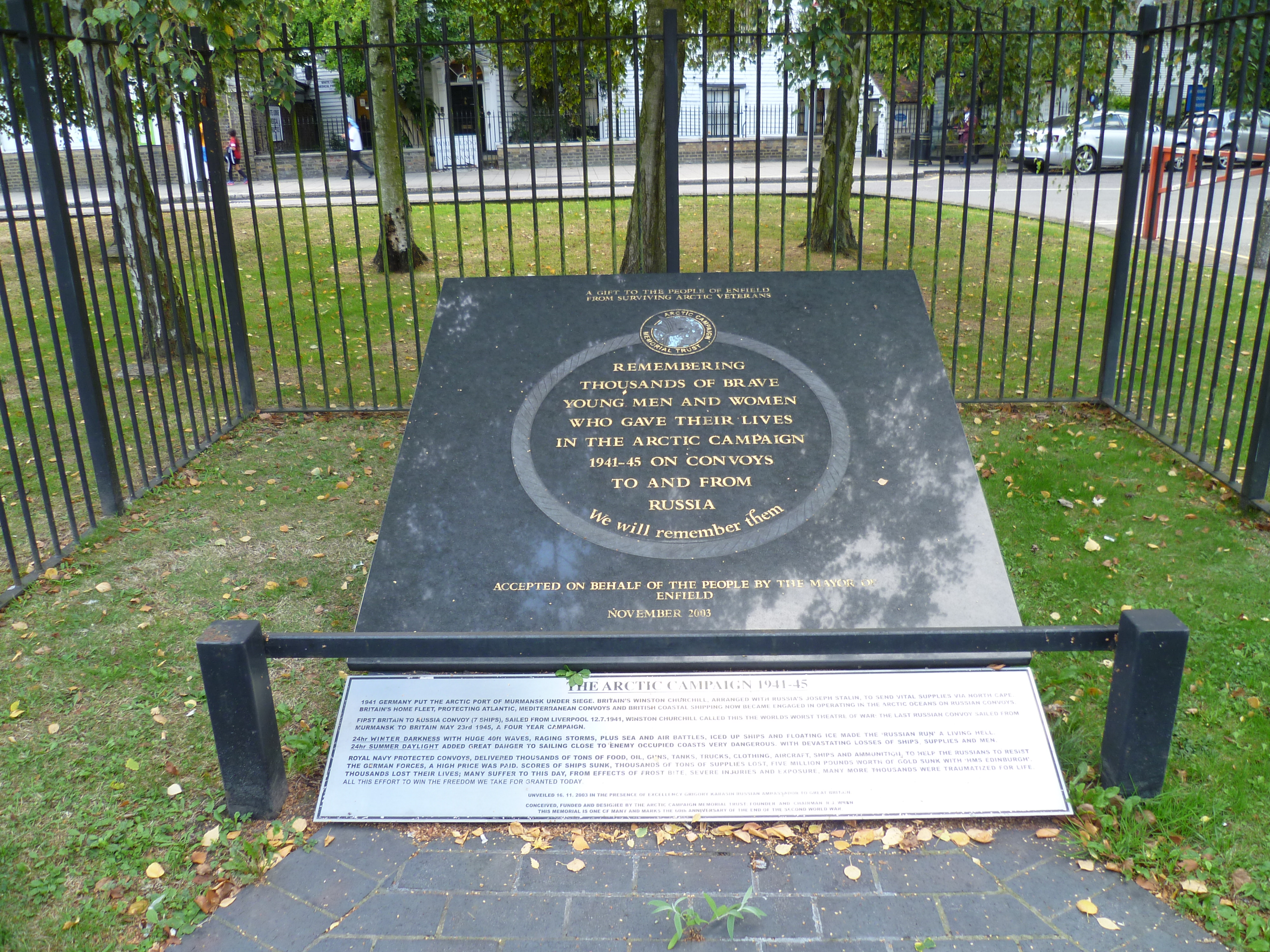
The Arctic campaign memorial in Silver Street, Enfield.

The principal war memorial in Enfield Town is the cenotaph that stands in Chase Green Gardens and is a grade II listed monument with Historic England. It commemorates men lost in both the World Wars as does a plaque in the town's main post office. In addition, in 2003 a memorial to those lost in the Arctic campaign of the Second World War was unveiled.

== Enfield War Memorial ==
The Enfield War Memorial stands in Chase Green Gardens in Enfield Town (51°39′14″N 0°05′20″W). It is a cenotaph style monument and grade II listed with Historic England. The memorial was built in 1921 to commemorate the deaths in the First World War of the men of Enfield. The names of men who died in the Second World War were subsequently added.

== Post office plaque ==
A small plaque exists in Enfield post office in Church Street (51°39′08″N 0°05′03″W) to the memory of post office employees who died in the World Wars.

== Arctic campaign memorial ==
A memorial to those who died in the Arctic campaign of the Second World War was unveiled in Silver Street, Enfield (51°39′15″N 0°04′49″W), in 2003 in a ceremony attended by the former mayor of Enfield, Stan Carter, who served in the campaign, and the Russian ambassador to the United Kingdom.
