= Forty Hill =

Suburb in Enfield, London

Coordinates: 51.665748°N 0.067274°W

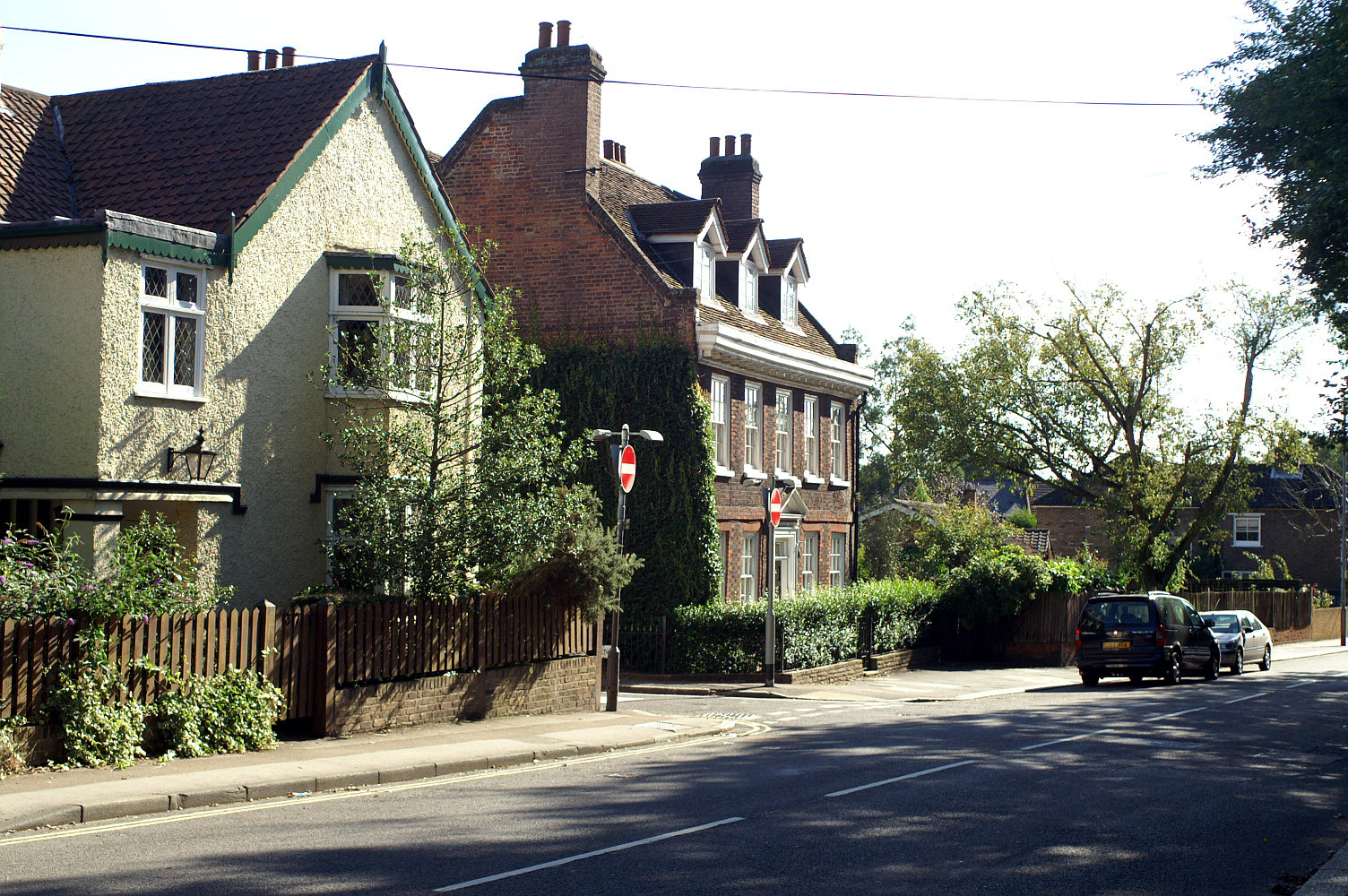
- Forty Hill

- Location within Greater London
- OS grid reference: TQ336981
- London borough: Enfield
- Ceremonial county: Greater London
- Region: London
- Country: England
- Sovereign state: United Kingdom
- Post town: ENFIELD
- Postcode district: EN1, EN2
- Dialling code: 020
- Police: Metropolitan
- Fire: London
- Ambulance: London
- UK Parliament: Enfield North
- London Assembly: Enfield and Haringey

Forty Hill is a largely residential suburb in the north of the London Borough of Enfield, England. To the north is Bulls Cross, to the south Enfield Town, to the west Clay Hill, and to the east Enfield Highway. Prior to 1965 it was in the historic county of Middlesex.

== Etymology ==
Forty Hill was recorded as Fortyehill 1610, Fortie hill 1619, Fortee hill 1686, named from Fortey c.1350, that is ' the island (of higher ground) in marsh ', from Old English forth-ēg with reference to the slightly rising ground above the River Lea marshes.

== History ==
There have been houses in the road now known as Forty Hill since at least 1572. The area includes the historic Forty Hall, built in the 17th century in the grounds of the former Tudor palace of Elsyng. In its grounds is the older (16th or early 17th-century) Dower House. Other older buildings nearby include the early 18th century Worcester Lodge and later 18th century Elsynge House and Sparrow Hall, and the 19th century Elms and Clock House. George Birkbeck (founder of what is now Birkbeck, University of London) lived at Forty Hill in the 1820s. Jesus Church, near Maiden's Bridge, was built in 1835 and the nearby school in 1851. Goat Lane is named after a pub established before 1794 which was replaced by a large building in mock-Elizabethan style in the 1930s; this has since been converted to flats. Some housing was built during Victorian times but most of the area consists of terraced houses and maisonettes built in the 1930s.

Interior of the Carpenter's Shop at Forty Hill, Enfield - exhibited 1813thumbnail

== Transport ==
There are many bus services which serve the area. Also nearby is Gordon Hill railway station. The area was formerly crossed by the A105 road, running north from Enfield Town past Forty Hall and Myddelton House to meet the A1010 near Waltham Cross. This was altered to terminate at the A110 in Enfield Town, and the main route cut to discourage through traffic from using the narrow Maiden's Bridge. There are now no major roads crossing the area, which is by-passed by the A110 to the south and the A10 to the east.

== Places of interest ==
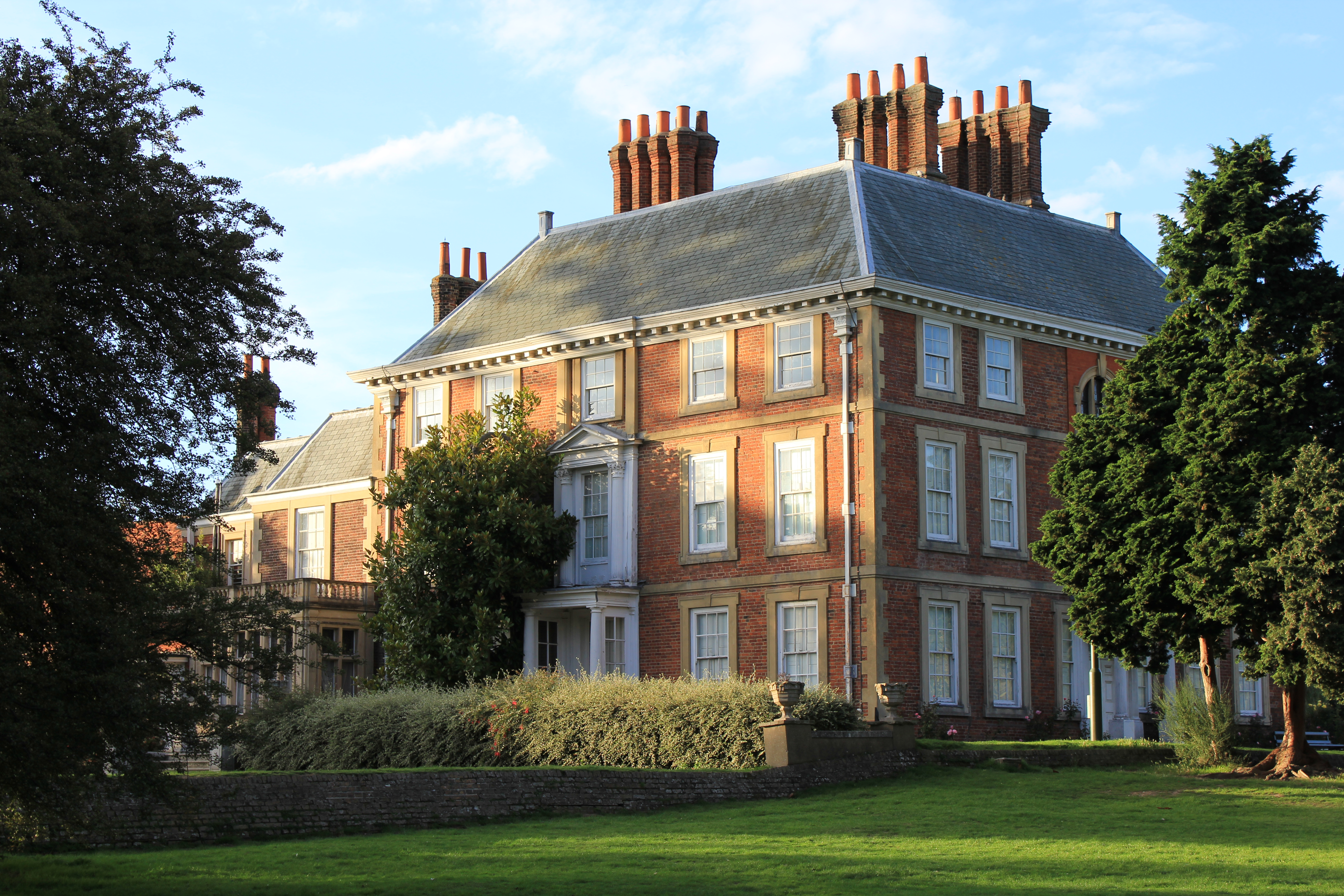
Forty Hall

Forty Hall Manor and Country Park is a manor with gardens, both of which can be explored. It is open all year round. Many events and exhibitions are held here. Forty Hall Farm includes an orchard and vineyard and hosts a monthly farmers' market as well live music events.

The London Loop long-distance footpath follows the Turkey Brook to the north of Forty Hall. Nearby to the north in Bulls Cross are Myddelton House Gardens (former home of botanist E. A. Bowles, open at certain times during the year) and Capel Manor horticultural college with 74 acres (0.3 km^{2}) of grounds open to the public, including a maze and themed gardens. Special events take place here throughout the year. Also nearby are Whitewebbs Park and Clay Hill House.

== Geology (and formation of the hill) ==
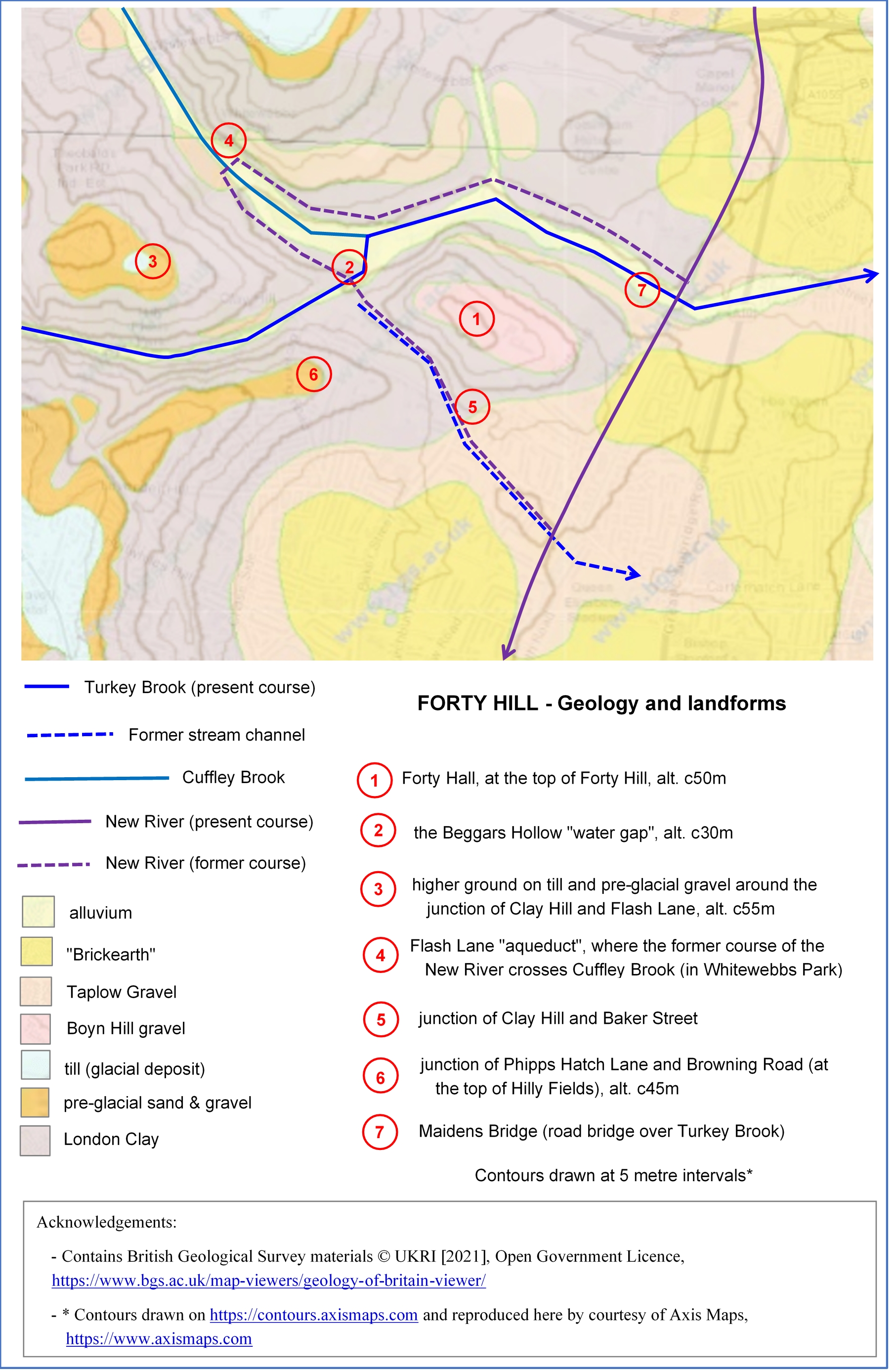
Diagram illustrating the geology, and formation as an isolated hill, of Forty Hill, Enfield, UK.

Sources for the material in this section include those listed in "Notes and References", below.

The hill which gives its name to the district lies to the north of the built-up area and is mainly occupied by Forty Hall and its grounds. It rises to a small plateau around 50 metres (160 ft) above sea level. This plateau is capped by Boyn Hill Gravel, a deposit laid down by the River Lea during cold climate conditions approximately 400,000 years ago, when that river lay further to the west, and at a higher altitude, than it does today.

At Boyn Hill time, the area where Forty Hill is today was actually in the bottom of the valley of the southward-flowing River Lea. The Boyn Hill gravel was deposited there, along a line linking Bulls Cross to Forty Hill, Bush Hill, Palmers Green and beyond, to the River Thames.

Also at Boyn Hill time, two of the Lea's tributaries, Cuffley Brook and Turkey Brook, flowed from higher ground to the north-west. They cut through pre-glacial sand and gravel and glacial till (the latter having been deposited by the Anglian ice advance about 450,000 years ago). These tributaries joined the Lea at points not far away from each other, north and south of where Forty Hall is today, at what is now an altitude of c50m.

Then the River Lea moved steadily towards the east. And, as a contour map shows, the two brooks each extended eastwards with the Lea, but stayed apart. The Lea and the two brooks cut down into the London Clay (to a today's altitude of c35m), thus defining the north, east and south sides of what was becoming Forty Hill.

(Forty Hill is thus an example of inverted relief, albeit on a small scale. Inversion of relief occurs "when materials on valley floors are, or become, more resistant to erosion than the adjacent valley slopes. As erosion proceeds, the valley floor becomes a ridge bounded by newly formed valleys on each side". In the case of Forty Hill, the permeable Boyn Hill Gravel on the hill protected the otherwise easily eroded London Clay underneath from being removed, while nearby watercourses cut down into exposed London Clay).

The brooks approached each other quite closely either side of Beggars Hollow (close to where, today, the Rose and Crown public house is located on Clay Hill). The dividing line between them was thus lowered by erosion at that point.

During further cold climate periods, the Lea laid down Taplow Gravel, east and south of Forty Hill. That was followed by Brickearth, a partially wind-blown deposit.

Later, the Lea moved further east to its present line, well away from Forty Hill, cutting down to a today's altitude of c20m at Waltham Abbey.

The low point between Turkey Brook and Cuffley Brook at Beggars Hollow was breached, probably in the relatively recent geological past. The Turkey Brook thus changed its course, there to go north-east, through a water gap (that is, a gap which, in this case, has been "formed through...erosion of two streams on opposite sides of a ridge, ultimately resulting in the capture of one stream by the other"). As a result, the Turkey Brook joined the Cuffley Brook, in Whitewebbs Park, thus defining the western edge of Forty Hill and isolating it from higher ground to the west.

East of the junction of Turkey Brook and Cuffley Brook, the stream is now known as Turkey Brook - and also locally as Maidens Brook.

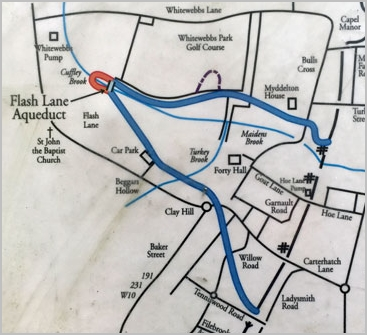
The route (in blue) of the former "Whitewebbs loop" of the New River (from an information board at the Flash Lane aqueduct).

The brooks subsequently cut down a little further and alluvium was deposited along the valley bottoms in Hilly Fields, Whitewebbs Park and the grounds of Forty Hall.

A dry, former stream channel at c30m was left, running just north of Clay Hill, from Beggars Hollow to a point close to today's junction of Clay Hill and Baker Street. That channel now defines the southern boundary of Forty Hill.

When the New River was built, it followed the 30m contour from Hertfordshire south towards London, down the Lea valley. But, in Enfield, the engineers who constructed it took the New River on a loop going west, to the north of Forty Hill, and then across Cuffley Brook near Flash Lane (and, later, across an aqueduct there). From that point, they took it south-east, through the water gap at Beggars Hollow, along the dry channel north of Clay Hill, and down to where Ladysmith Road is today. Then the New River continued on its southward course, towards Enfield Town.

The New River was later straightened to flow southwards continuously, to the east of Forty Hill. An aqueduct was built for the New River to cross Turkey Brook near Maidens Bridge. This left the former course of the New River as it is today, curling through Whitewebbs Park, passing through Beggars Hollow and following the dry channel.

== Nearby areas ==
Whitewebbs Park
