= Bulls Cross =

Road and hamlet in the London Borough of Enfield, north London

Coordinates: 51.67815°N 0.059325°W

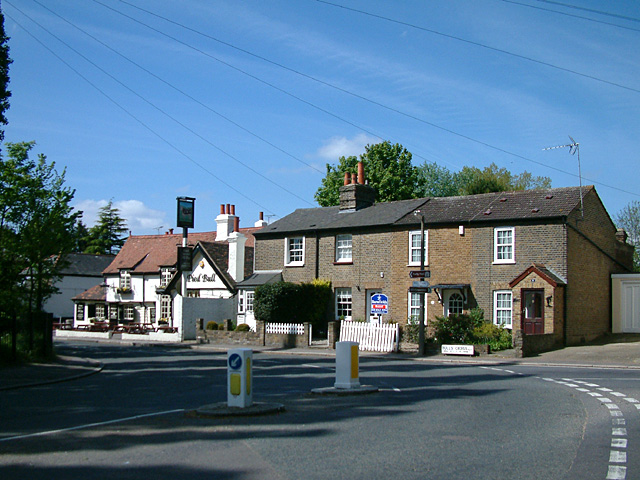
- Cottages at Bulls Cross

- Location within Greater London
- OS grid reference: TQ342994
- London borough: Enfield
- Ceremonial county: Greater London
- Region: London
- Country: England
- Sovereign state: United Kingdom
- Post town: ENFIELD
- Postcode district: EN1, EN2
- Post town: WALTHAM CROSS
- Postcode district: EN7
- Dialling code: 01992, 020
- Police: Metropolitan
- Fire: London
- Ambulance: London
- UK Parliament: Enfield North
- London Assembly: Enfield and Haringey

Bulls Cross is a road and hamlet in Enfield, London, on the outskirts of north London, forming part of the Metropolitan Green Belt. Although it now lies within the ceremonial county of Greater London, prior to 1965 it was in the historic county of Middlesex. The area is situated west of the Great Cambridge Road, and south of the M25 motorway. Crews Hill is to the west, Bury Green (near Cheshunt) to the north, and Bullsmoor to the east.

== Etymology ==
Bulls Cross is recorded as Bedelscrosse in 1465. Recorded thus in c.1580 and on the Ordnance Survey map of 1822. The hamlet was also recorded in 1540 as Bullyscrosse meaning 'crossroads associated with the family called Bolle or Bull (who are mentioned in legal documents from the 13th century).

== Tottenham Hotspur ==
In 2009 football club Tottenham Hotspur announced plans for a training centre to be built in the area. It was opened in September 2012.

== Geography ==
Bulls Cross is in the north of the borough. It is bordered by Bullsmoor Lane and Whitewebbs Lane to the north, Forty Hall to the south. and the New River to the east and Whitewebbs Park to the west.

== Demography ==
Bulls Cross is part of the large Chase ward, which also covers Botany Bay, Clay Hill and Crews Hill. The 2011 census showed that 77% of the ward's population was white (64% British, 11% Other, 2% Irish). 5% was Black African and 3% Black Caribbean.

== Places of interest ==
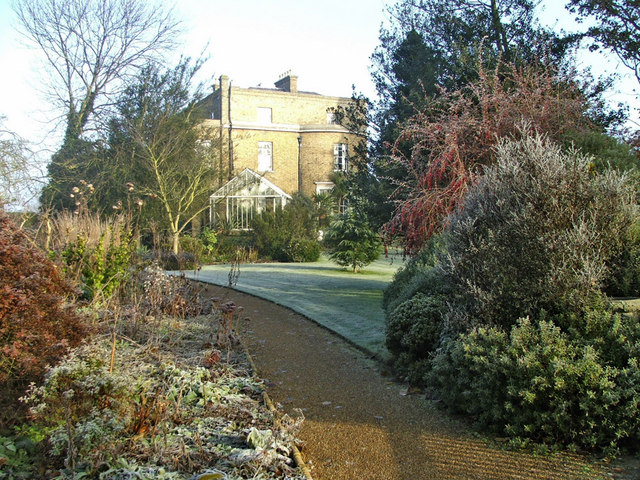
Myddelton House and gardens

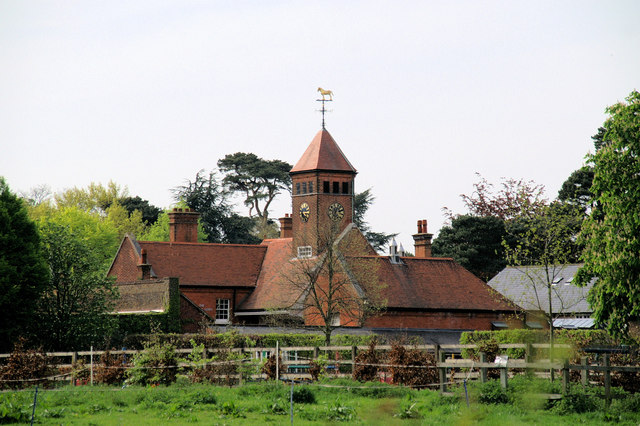
Capel Manor stable block. The weather vane depicts a Clydesdale horse

- Capel Manor. Now the home of the Capel Manor College with extensive model gardens which are open to the public. Built in red brick, the 18th-century house was remodelled in 1908 in late 17th-century style for James Warren, a wealthy tea planter. Behind the house, an orange brick group of late 19th-century stables and coachhouse with clocktower. The stables are the home to the Clydesdale working horses which are used on the estate.
- Myddelton House. Since 1972 the headquarters of Lee Valley Regional Park Authority (LVRPA). The house was built in 1818 by George Ferry & John Wallen for H. C. Bowles. The plantsman E.A. Bowles created Myddelton House gardens in c.1900 which are open to the public. The grounds contain the original Market Cross of Enfield Town, which is subject to a Grade II preservation order. There is also a modern museum with artefacts and displays relating to the life and work of E.A. Bowles.
- Pied Bull. The small, rendered, timber-framed public house existed here in 1752. Standing with a group of cottages close to the junction with Bullsmore Lane.

== Notable people ==
- Bernard Bosanquet, cricketer
- E.A. Bowles, horticulturist and plantsman
- Frances Perry, horticulturist, gardening writer and presenter
