= North Enfield Cricket Club =

Cricket club

North Enfield Cricket Club is a cricket club in Enfield, Greater London.

== History ==
North Enfield Cricket Club has been in existence for 127 years. Initially playing at Claysmore - farmland located between Clay Hill and Whitewebbs Park until World War II interrupted much local sport. The current ground at Strayfield Road, only a few hundred yards from Claysmore, is part of Hilly Fields Park, owned by Enfield Council.

In 1951/52, the Council agreed to lease the land to the club with the condition that the club own and maintain both the cricket square and the pavilion and car park. A public right of way continues to exist across the middle of the playing area. The club continues to lease the land from the council on a 30-year lease, and is a protected tenant.

== Prominent cricketers ==
The post-war years saw Frank Barwick emerge as one of North Enfield's most successful cricketers. Barwick won the 1st XI batting and bowling awards for three consecutive years, and the bowling award for a further two from 1948, a record that remains unmatched in the club's history. Barwick joined North Enfield having previously played for Enfield CC before the war. Contemporary accounts suggest that had it not been for the 1939–45 conflict, Barwick may have played first-class cricket for Middlesex. According to club accounts, he left Enfield CC due to a disagreement over his role in the team.

Other prominent professional cricketers that have associations with North Enfield are Mike Smith of Middlesex and England, whose family was involved at North Enfield for many years, staged a benefit game at North Enfield in 1976. John Emburey, the Middlesex and England spin bowler, who played in the North Enfield Centenary game against MCC and Benefit 1986 and Graham Barlow (Benefit fixture 1983). Middlesex wicket keeper Keith Brown was also a good friend of the Club for many years. Rumours also abound that England leg-spinner B.J.T. Bosanquet also played for North Enfield, (he was born at Bulls Cross and lived locally for some time) but no records exist to confirm this.

== Fixtures and events ==
The club has participated in league cricket in various forms over the years, principally the Saturday Hertfordshire League and the Chess Valley Sunday league from its inception until 2007. The club fields two teams at present - in Divisions 3 and 8 respectively for the 1st and 2nd XIs on the back of promotions for both sides in 2010. A Sunday friendly XI exists for those who prefer their cricket to be of a more relaxed nature. Fixtures take place home and away against teams from across North and East London, Hertfordshire and Essex. Sunday cricket is of a very mixed standard with a 'give everybody a game' emphasis (and provision of a good tea also features high on priority lists). In the last few years, the resurgence of 20 over cricket has brought a number of Friday night games at North Enfield, in particular the annual match against Enfield Scouts XI in aid of Help for Heroes. The club pitch may be hired on Friday nights for office or club games. The Colts section continues the excellent work since 2009, and the club is playing U10s matches in 2013.
