= Crews Hill =

Village in northern outskirts of London

Coordinates: 51.678°N 0.097°W

- Village
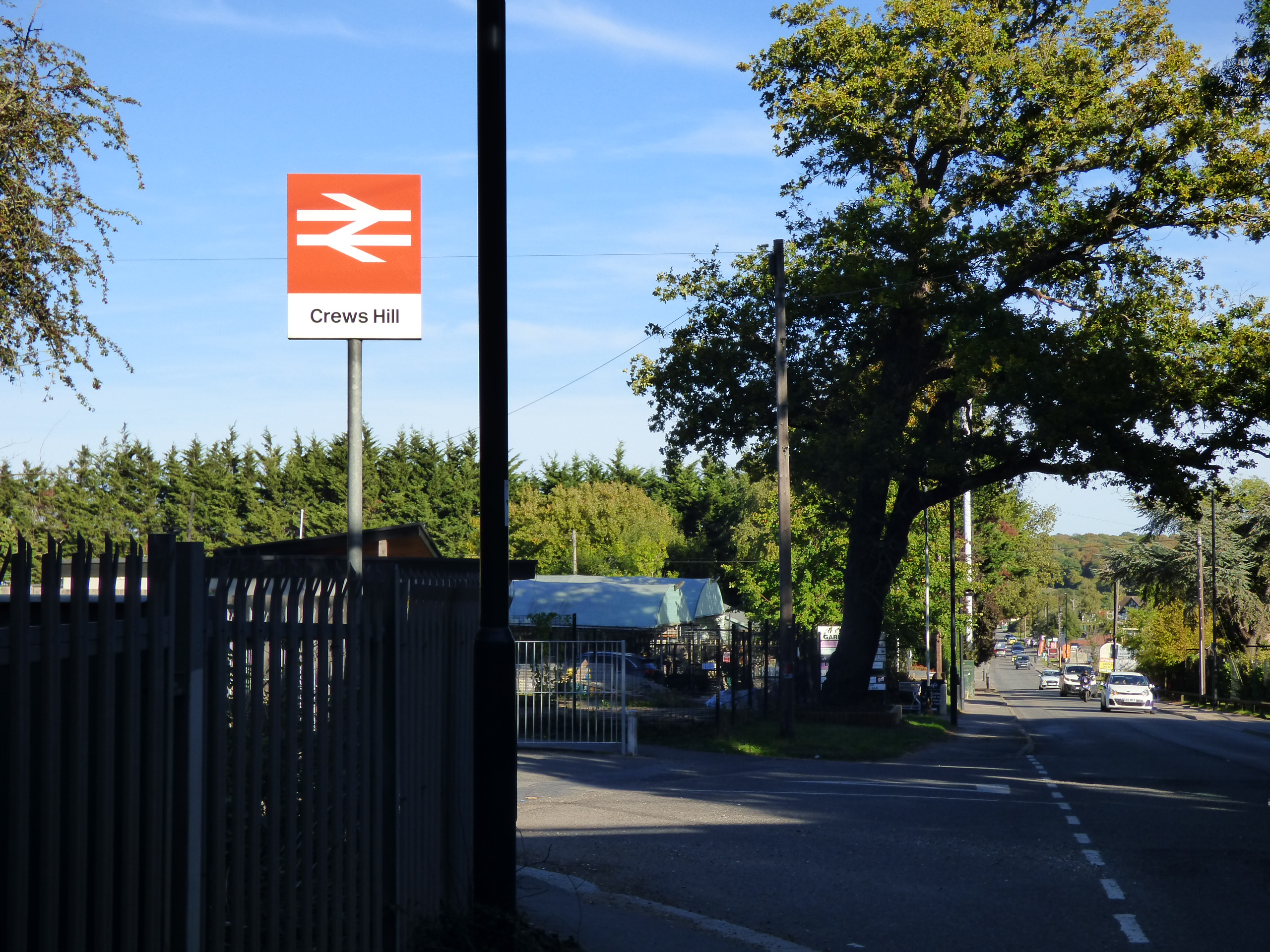
- Cattlegate Road and the railway station

- Location within Greater London
- OS grid reference: TQ315995
- London borough: Enfield
- Ceremonial county: Greater London
- Region: London
- Country: England
- Sovereign state: United Kingdom
- Post town: ENFIELD
- Postcode district: EN2
- Dialling code: 020
- Police: Metropolitan
- Fire: London
- Ambulance: London
- UK Parliament: Enfield North
- London Assembly: Enfield and Haringey

Crews Hill is a village in the London Borough of Enfield, England. It is mostly designated as part of the Metropolitan Green Belt and surrounded by the Enfield Chase heritage area of special character. The village historically formed part of the county of Middlesex. Known for its numerous garden centres and plant nurseries, the village lies 12.3 miles (20 km) north of Charing Cross, just south of the M25 motorway. In 2025 the government proposed the development of a large new town at Crews Hill.

== History ==
=== Toponymy ===
It is named from its association with the Crew family, mentioned in local records of the mid-18th century. John and Charles Crew, originally from Barnet, engaged in long and sometimes violent criminal careers in Enfield Chase. William Crew worked for a time as an employee of the Duchy of Lancaster, the owners of Enfield Chase who were often in conflict with the commoners and common rights of Enfield. Crew also had a long criminal career and engaged in long feuds with the Duchy and appears to have become a folk hero, or anti-hero as a result. William Crew lived to 104 and gave his name to Crews Hill.

== Geography ==
Crews Hill is a village in the London Borough of Enfield. It is all designated Metropolitan Green Belt, except for five streets forming a compact built-up area. A larger semi-urbanised area is surrounded by the Enfield Chase heritage area of special character. Turkey Brook flows through Crews Hill.

== Transport ==
Crews Hill is served by Crews Hill railway station with trains to Hertford North, Stevenage, in the north, and Moorgate in the south. Starting in 2021, bus route 456 connects Crews Hill to the North Middlesex Hospital via Enfield Chase and Winchmore Hill.

== Demography ==
At the 2011 United Kingdom census, Crews Hill was part of the large Chase ward, which also covered Botany Bay, Clay Hill and Bulls Cross. 77% of the ward's population was white (64% British, 11% Other, 2% Irish), 5% was Black African and 3% Black Caribbean.

== Economy ==
Crews Hill originally had a large area of glasshouse production, to serve the nearby London market with cut flowers, pot plants and vegetables. As this became less economic, these sites transformed into a number of garden centres and retail nurseries. Describing the horticultural output of Crews Hill, journalist Ian Jack wrote: "The greenhouses at Crews Hill ('Britain's horticultural mile') used to supply London with flowers and salads. Then came garden centres. Now there are warehouses filled with flowers, chilled at a permanent 7C, the same temperature that has kept them fresh in the six-hour lorry and rail journey through the tunnel from the auctions in Holland."

== Places of interest ==
Crews Hill Golf Course dates from 1916. John White, the Tottenham Hotspur and Scotland national football team player, was killed by lightning while sheltering under a tree at the golf course on 21 July 1964. On Whitewebbs Lane there is the Whitewebbs Museum of Transport. Further along the road is Whitewebbs Park. In April 2025 a 500-year-old oak tree was felled by pub chain Mitchells & Butlers, causing much criticism. A section of Whitewebbs Park has been leased to Tottenham Hotspur who, despite objections, plan to fence off 16 hectares (40 acres) of parkland and build a training ground for the women's team, a new women's academy and a new clubhouse.

== Proposed new town ==
In September 2025, the government announced that a new town would be established at Crews Hill and Chase Park. The new town would include more than 20,000 houses with the intention of up to half being classified as 'affordable housing', meaning that sales or rental price would be discounted 20% from the market rate. In March 2026, the Ministry of Housing, Communities and Local Government announced that Crews Hill and Chase Park was one of seven shortlisted areas for potential development. (Note: The other areas were Brabazon and West Innovation Arc, Gloucestershire; Leeds South Bank, West Yorkshire; Tempsford, Bedfordshire; Thamesmead, south-east London; Victoria North, Manchester; and a site in Milton Keynes.) Further consultation is expected to take place, with final decisions due later in the year. In the May 2026 local election, Labour lost control of Enfield Council to a minority Conservative administration. Later that same month, the council withdrew support for the new town.
