= Grange Park =

Grange Park may refer to:

== Canada ==
- Grange Park (Toronto), a public park from the estate of the Grange
  - Grange Park (neighbourhood), the neighbourhood surrounding the park

== United Kingdom ==
- Grange Park, Blackpool, council estate
- Grange Park, Enfield, London suburb
  - Grange Park (ward)
  - Grange Park railway station
- Kilburn Grange Park, park in Kilburn, London
- Grange Park, Northamptonshire, village and civil parish
- Grange Park Opera, company based in West Horsley Place, Surrey
- Grange Park, Wetherby, a multi-purpose sports ground

== United States ==
- La Grange Park, Illinois, village
