= Grange Park, London =

Grange Park, London may refer to:

- Grange Park, Enfield
- Kilburn Grange Park
