= Enfield Old Park =

Ancient deer park in England

Coordinates: 51°38′57″N 0°06′11″W

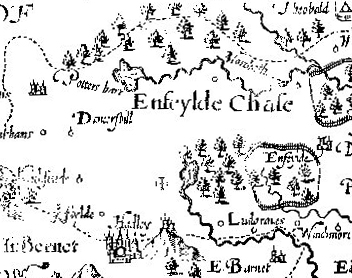
Enfield Old Park from a map of Middlesex by John Norden, c. 1593. The Park is the enclosed area at the lower right.

Enfield Old Park was an ancient deer park located in Enfield (today a suburb of London). It is mentioned in the Domesday Book. The Domesday Book mentions only one other Park in Middlesex, at Ruislip, and according to Historic England both are therefore considered to be "rare and important historical sites". Today part of Old Park is built over as part of the suburb of Grange Park, but large areas also remain open and undeveloped.

== Early history ==
The Park was situated around the site of an Iron Age hill fort, the remains of which can still be seen in the vicinity of the building of Old Park House (now belonging to the Bush Hill Golf Club). These constitute the largest present-day hill fort remains in the old county of Middlesex.

The Domesday Book (1086) records the Manor of Enfield as being held by Geoffrey de Mandeville and mentions 'there is a park there'. The word 'park' in this sense refers to a preserve for game, and the park was reserved for this use until the 18th century. As the manor of Enfield had been held in Anglo-Saxon times by Asgar, Master of the Stud to Edward the Confessor, it is very possible that the area was already a game-park before the Norman Conquest. John Norden's map of Middlesex (c. 1593) clearly shows the fenced-in Old Park, with Salmons Brook flowing through it.

Adjacent to Salmon's Brook within Enfield Golf course are the earthwork remains of a medieval moated house, which is considered to be the site of the Park Ranger's lodge, and according to Historic England's description of the scheduled monument, "The association of the moated site with a medieval deer park, probably as the site of a park lodge, enhances its importance".

== Royal property ==
In the mediaeval era the Park was recorded in documents as 'Parcus Intrinsicus' (Latin, 'the Inner Park') to distinguish it from the much larger, and unenclosed, Enfield Chase. The name 'Old Park' seems to have been applied from the 15th century. Around this time, the Park, together with the Manor of Enfield, became royal property as part of the Duchy of Lancaster.

Queen Elizabeth I frequently visited Enfield for hunting and stayed sometimes at the Manor House, known as 'Enfield Palace', which stood at the edge of the Park, and sometimes at Enfield House (Elsyng Palace). In 1596, Robert Carey, 1st Earl of Monmouth recorded that "The Queen came to dinner at Enfield House and had toils [traps] set up in the park to shoot the bucks after dinner".

In the early 17th century the course of the New River was laid through part of the Park. In April 1620 a review of the Park's stock gave a total of 207 fallow deer, of which 73 were "Deare of Anteleir" (i.e. antlered males).

During the Commonwealth period, the Park was sequestered by Oliver Cromwell's Protectorate, and a detailed survey was prepared. This assessed the area of the Park as 553 acres (2.2 km^{2}), and its value as £311/10/- (i.e. £311.50 in present-day notation). It also mentions the Park's stock of coneys (rabbits), and "50 sorts of several deer". The Park was given initially to Parliamentary soldiers in lieu of their overdue wages, but was then granted to George Monck, 1st Duke of Albemarle.

== Enclosure and after ==
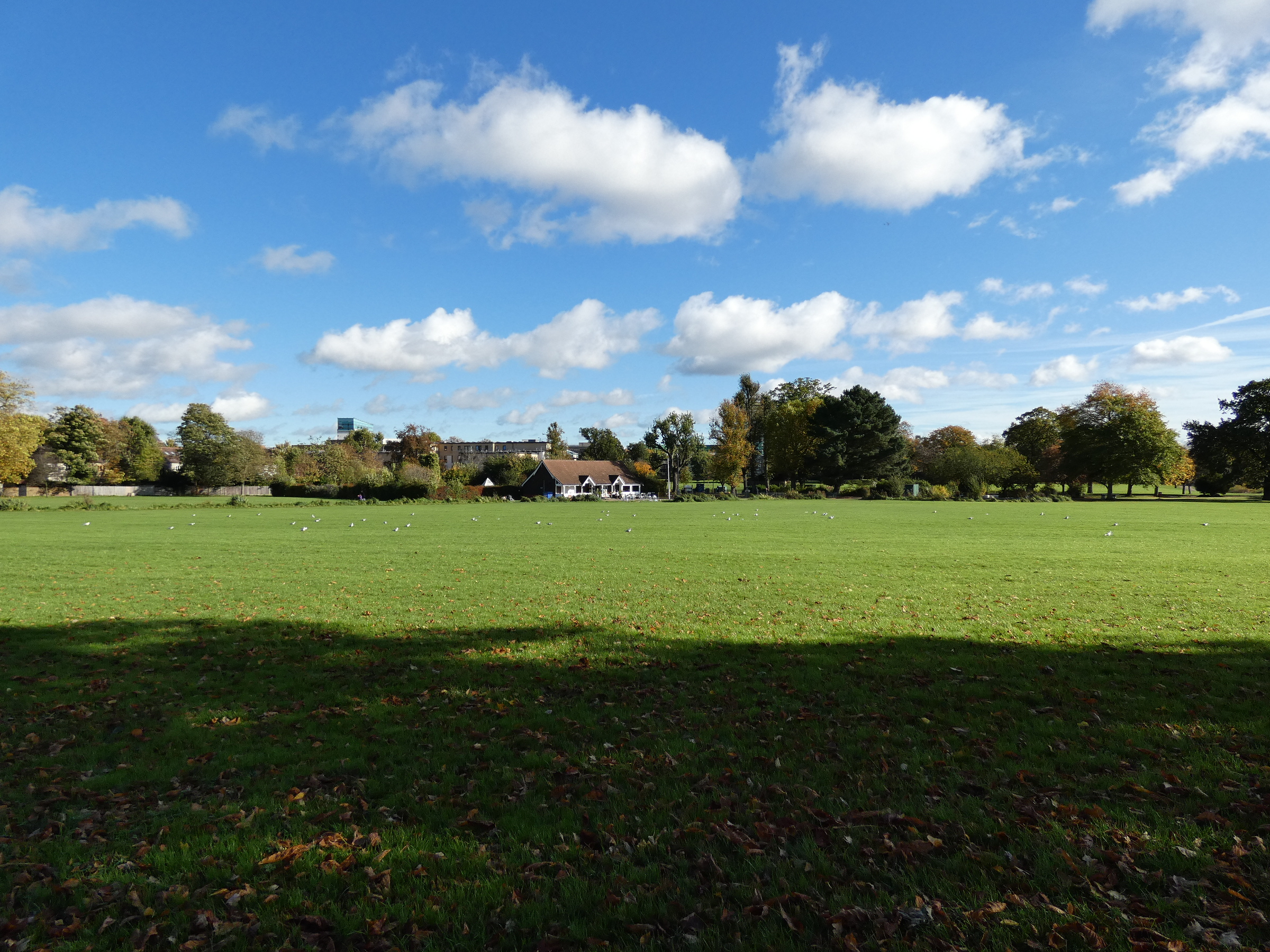
Town Park pictured in 2021

At the Restoration the park remained in Monck's family, who began to sell parts of it. However the nature of the park was to change as a consequence of the Enfield Chase Act 1777 (17 Geo. 3. c. 17), an inclosure act, which divided Enfield Chase amongst several parishes and owners, including the then owner of the park, Samuel Clayton. This necessitated the establishment of a number of new roads (including the present Green Dragon Lane) and gateways. Over the next century much of the land changed hands and although the area was essentially agricultural, building began in many parts of the Old Park Estate. In 1893/95, two golf clubs (Enfield Golf Club and Bush Hill Golf Club) undertook long leases on parts of the Old Park, and they continue to operate there to the present day.

The advent of the railway to the area (both Grange Park station and Enfield Chase station are situated within the original boundaries of the Old Park) meant that the land became valuable for domestic housing, and between 1910 and 1936 most of the present suburb of Grange Park was constructed.

The park is still remembered in several road names, notably Old Park Ridings, Old Park Road and Old Park Avenue. Enfield Town Park and Cheyne Walk Open Space are the only publicly accessible remnants of the open space that was once Enfield Old Park.

== Sources ==
- Haigh, Douglas, Old Park in the Manor of Enfield, London 1977.
- Pevsner, Nikolaus and Bridget Cherry The Buildings of England: London 4:North, London 1998 ISBN 0-14-071049-3
- Victoria Country History: Middlesex, vol.5, London 1976 (also online)
- Weinreb, Ben, The London Encyclopaedia. London, 1983
