= South Lodge =

One of three lodges in the royal hunting ground of Enfield Chase

Coordinates: 51.6494°N 0.1227°W

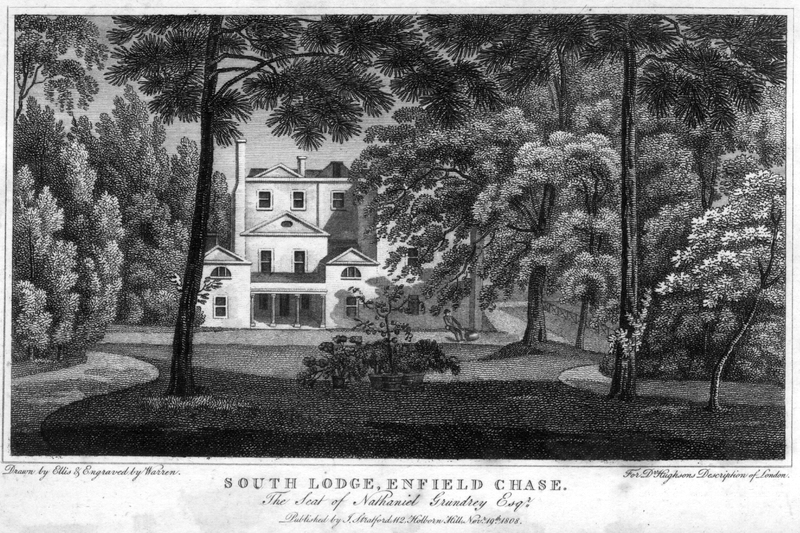
South Lodge, Enfield Chase, 1808.

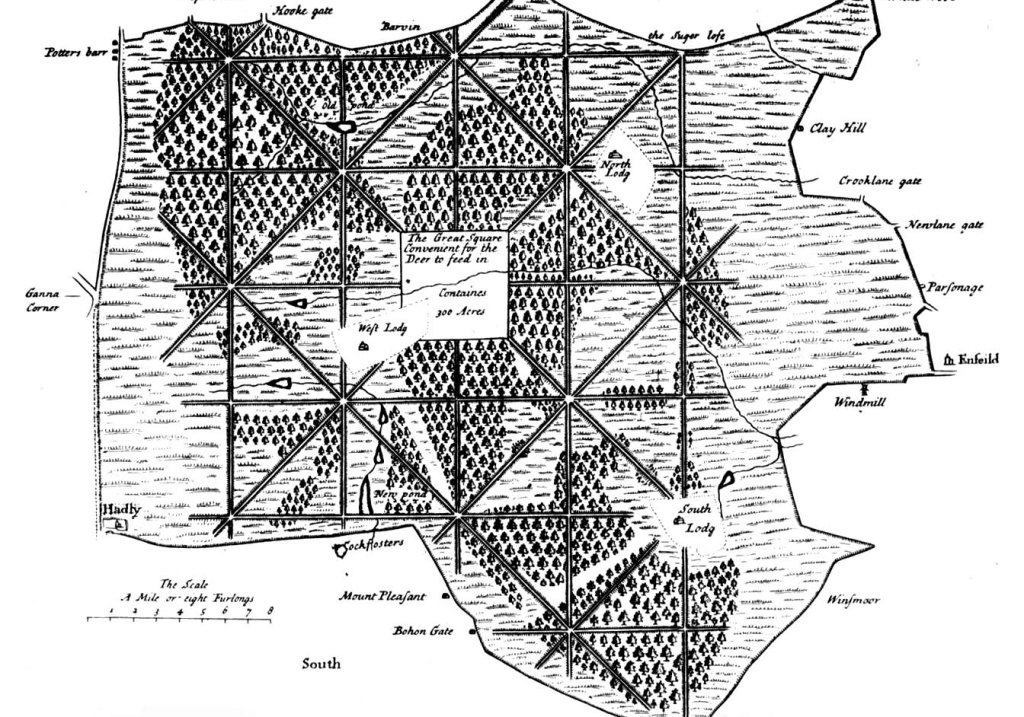
South Lodge (lower right) on a map drawn-up following Hugh Westlake's survey of Enfield Chase in 1700.

South Lodge was one of the three lodges in the royal hunting ground of Enfield Chase. It was originally known as the South-bailey alongside the East-bailey and the West-bailey.

The lake from the former gardens of the Lodge survives at Lakeside.

== Bibliography ==
- AC10079504, Anonymus (1820). London and Its Environs; Or the General Ambulator, and Pocket Companion for the Tour of the Metropolis and Its Vicinity ... 12. Ed. Scatcherd & Letterman.
- Brayley, Edward Wedlake (1816). London and Middlesex: Or, An Historical, Commercial, & Descriptive Survey of the Metropolis of Great-Britain: Including Sketches of Its Environs, and a Topographical Account of the Most Remarkable Places in the Above County. W. Wilson.
