= Winchmore Hill Post Office Sorting Office =

Building in Winchmore Hill, London, England

Coordinates: 51°37′58″N 0°05′56″W

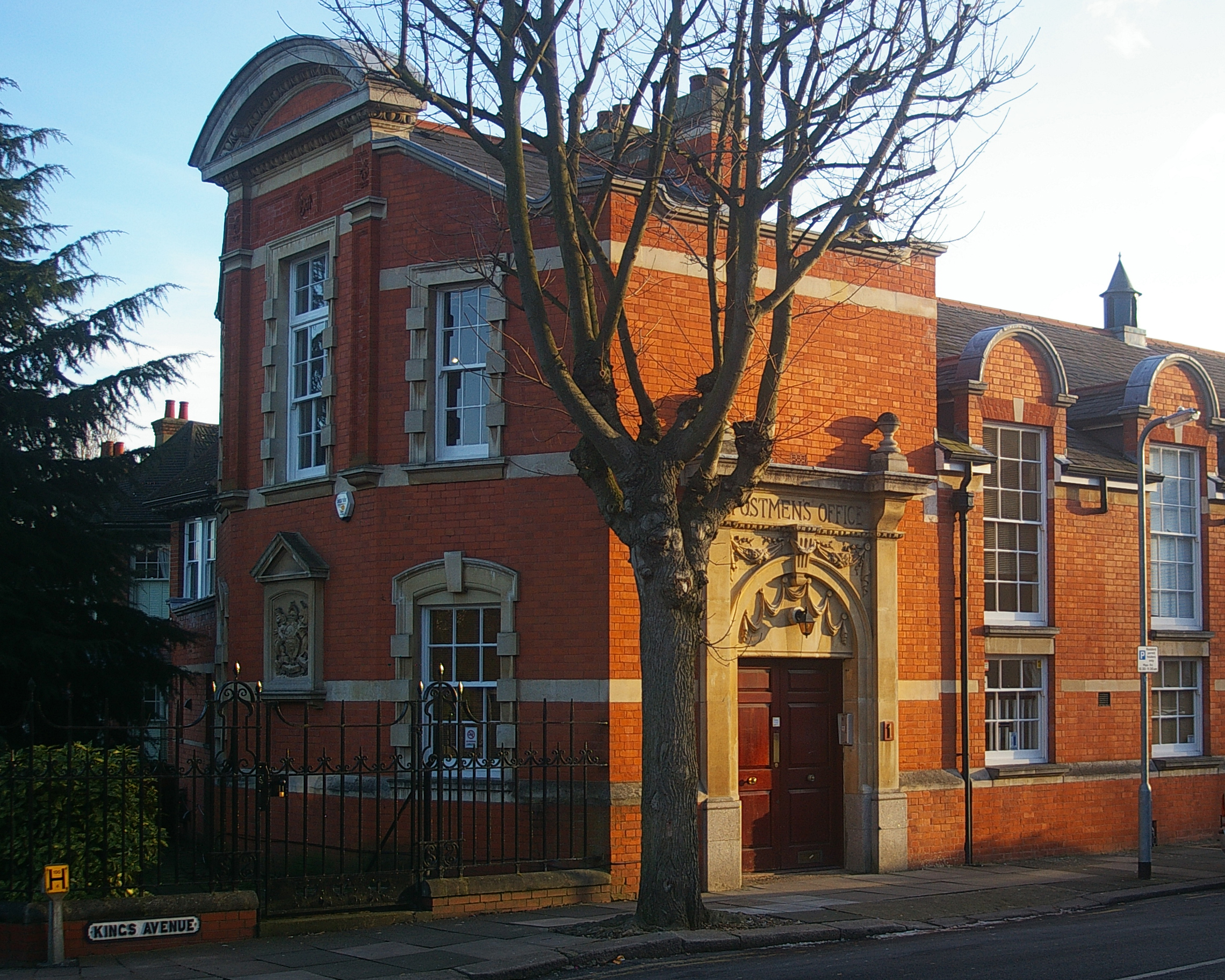
Winchmore Hill Post Office Sorting Office

The Winchmore Hill Post Office Sorting Office at Station Road, Winchmore Hill, London, is a grade II listed building with Historic England. It was designed by Jasper Wager and built by Mattock and Parsons in 1904.
