= Appleby Court =

Coordinates: 51.620°N 0.118°W

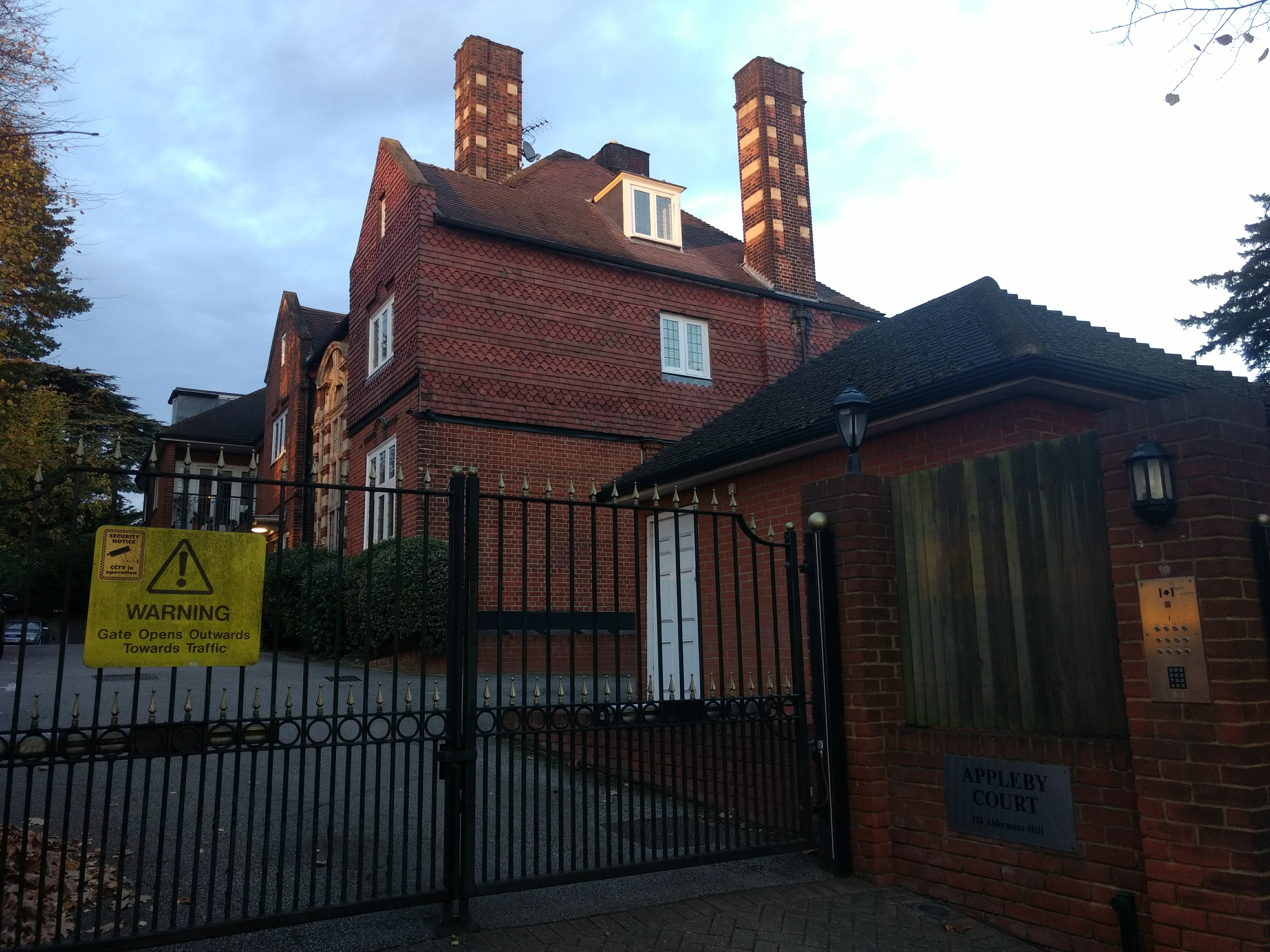
Appleby Court entrance from Aldermans Hill with modern outbuildings

Appleby Court is an architecturally notable building at 128 Aldermans Hill, Palmers Green, London.

The house was built in 1892 for the architect Joseph Benjamin Franklin as his own home and was the first house to be built on Aldermans Hill due to local development being blocked by the landowners the Taylors of Grovelands and the Walkers of Arnos Grove. It is number four on the London Borough of Enfield's Local Heritage List 2024 on the grounds of its significance for "Historic Association; Architectural Quality; Urban Design Quality; Social and Communal Value; Literary or Creative Association." It is in the Richard Norman Shaw Arts and Crafts tradition. It has since been converted to flats. It was originally numbered 127 but that number has now been taken by the adjacent and more recent Willowcroft Lodge.

== See also ==
- Cullands Grove
