= Glenwood House =

House in Enfield, London, England

Coordinates: 51°38′08″N 0°06′11″W

Glenwood House

Glenwood House is a Grade II listed townhouse in Winchmore Hill. It was built c. 1800 (226 years ago).

== History ==
The house was originally part of a pair, but the other house has been demolished and replaced with smaller buildings forming Keble School It was listed in January 1974. The walls in front of the property have been listed as architecturally significant by the local council.

== Architecture ==
The house is made up of three storeys, plus an attic and a basement, and a two-storey extension to the left of the property. The partition wall between the demolished house to the right has not been particularly well-rendered. The building has been constructed of stock brickwork and topped with a slated mansard roof. The original sash windows were later replaced with gauged brick arches.
