= Winchmore Hill =

Suburb in London, England

Coordinates: 51.6339°N 0.0990°W

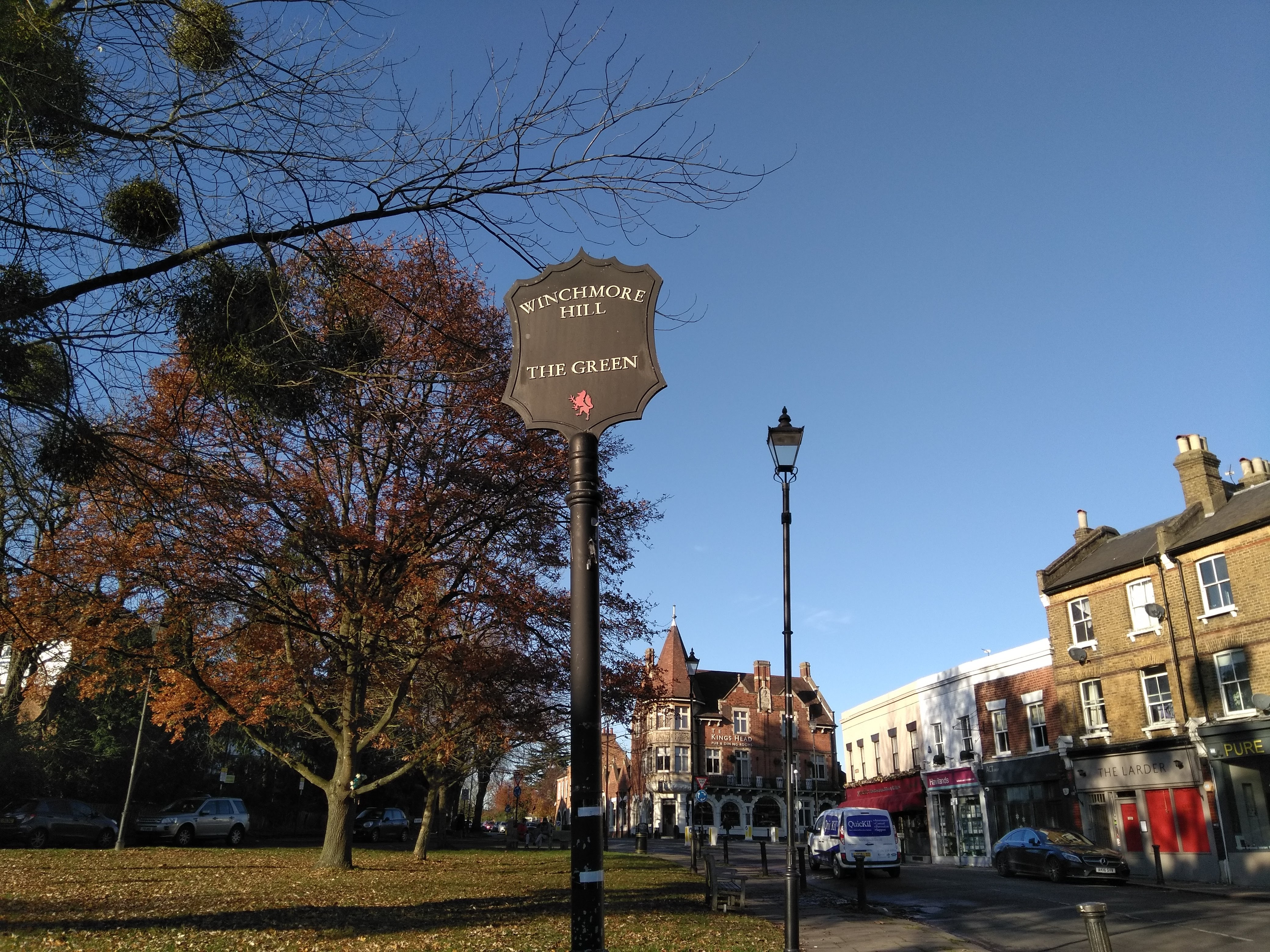
- The Green in Winchmore Hill

- Location within Greater London
- OS grid reference: TQ315945
- London borough: Enfield
- Ceremonial county: Greater London
- Region: London
- Country: England
- Sovereign state: United Kingdom
- Post town: LONDON
- Postcode district: N21
- Dialling code: 020
- Police: Metropolitan
- Fire: London
- Ambulance: London
- UK Parliament: Edmonton and Winchmore Hill
- London Assembly: Enfield and Haringey

Winchmore Hill is a suburb in the London Borough of Enfield, north London, England, in the N21 postal district. The Winchmore Hill conservation area serves as the focal point of the district. Geographically, it is bounded on the east by Green Lanes (the A105 road), Barrowell Green, Firs Lane and Fords Grove. To the northwest, it is bordered by Grovelands Park. The southern boundary extends to part of Aldermans Hill, while the northern boundary reaches Vicars Moor Lane and Houndsden Road. Winchmore Hill is 8.9 miles (14.3 km) northeast of Charing Cross.

== History ==
Once a small hamlet in the parish of Edmonton, Winchmore Hill borders Palmers Green, Southgate, Edmonton, and Grange Park.

Prior to the Roman invasion, the areas now known as Hertfordshire, Essex, and Middlesex were occupied by the Catuvellauni tribe. It is believed that this tribe built a hill fort on the mound now occupied by Bush Hill Park Golf Club.

The earliest recorded mention of Winchmore Hill is in a deed dated A.D. 1319, where it is spelled Wynsemerhull. According to the Concise Oxford Dictionary of English Place Names, 'merhull' in Old English translates to 'boundary hill'. It is speculated that the name might mean 'Wynsige's boundary hill'. By 1395, the name had been altered to Wynsmerhull, and by 1565, the village was known as Wynsmorehyll, eventually becoming Winchmore Hill by the time it was mentioned in state papers in 1586.

Winchmore Hill is home to many buildings of historical significance. The first recorded religious building is the Quaker Meeting House, established in 1688 and rebuilt in 1790. Notable individuals buried here include Luke Howard, the father of modern meteorology, Alice Hum, founder of Palmers Green High School for Girls, and members of the Hoare and Barclay banking families. Samuel Hoare, a founder of the 'Society for Effecting the Abolition of the Slave Trade', played a prominent role in the campaign against the slavery.

St Paul's Church, built as a Waterloo church on land donated from the Grovelands estate, once had the largest unsupported expanse of plasterwork ceiling in Europe until renovations in the 1960s added concealed supports. The original wooden clapboard St Paul's School building can still be seen further down Church Hill. Remnants of the second brick-and-stone school building are evident in the walls of the church car park. The current school building, constructed in the 1960s, is located on Ringwood Way, off Station Road. Other historical buildings can be see on Wades Hill, leading north from The Green. Notably, there are wooden clapboard cottages and a tall-five story residential building dating back to 1710, reminiscent of Georgian townhouses in London's West End.

The oldest pub in the district was likely the Green Dragon on Green Lanes, reputed to have opened in 1726 at the junction of Green Lanes and Green Dragon Lane. The Victoria County History records that by 1752, the Green Dragon was established, although not in its present form. Historically, highwaymen caught near the pub were hanged at a gallows erected by its front entrance. This gallows remained for years, prompting the pub's relocation to the bottom of Vicars Moor Lane by the late 18th century. The original Green Dragon was demolished in 1892, and the new one was extensively remodelled in 1935. It ceased operating as a public house in 2015, although the building remains as a supermarket.

The Woodman pub, near the end of Broad Walk, reportedly dates back to 1727, though some evidence suggests it was built in 1820. Before obtaining a pub licence in 1868, it was a private residence.

Woodside House and Rowantree House on The Green at the end of Broad Walk were built in 1750 and of painted brick. Numerous local buildings constructed between 1770 and 1839 remain today. Near the Dog and Duck on Hoppers Road are old terraced houses built around 1770. Number 106A Vicars Moor Lane is a distinctive private residence retaining the façade of a chapel. To the east on the same road are residences likely built in the late eighteenth or early nineteenth century.

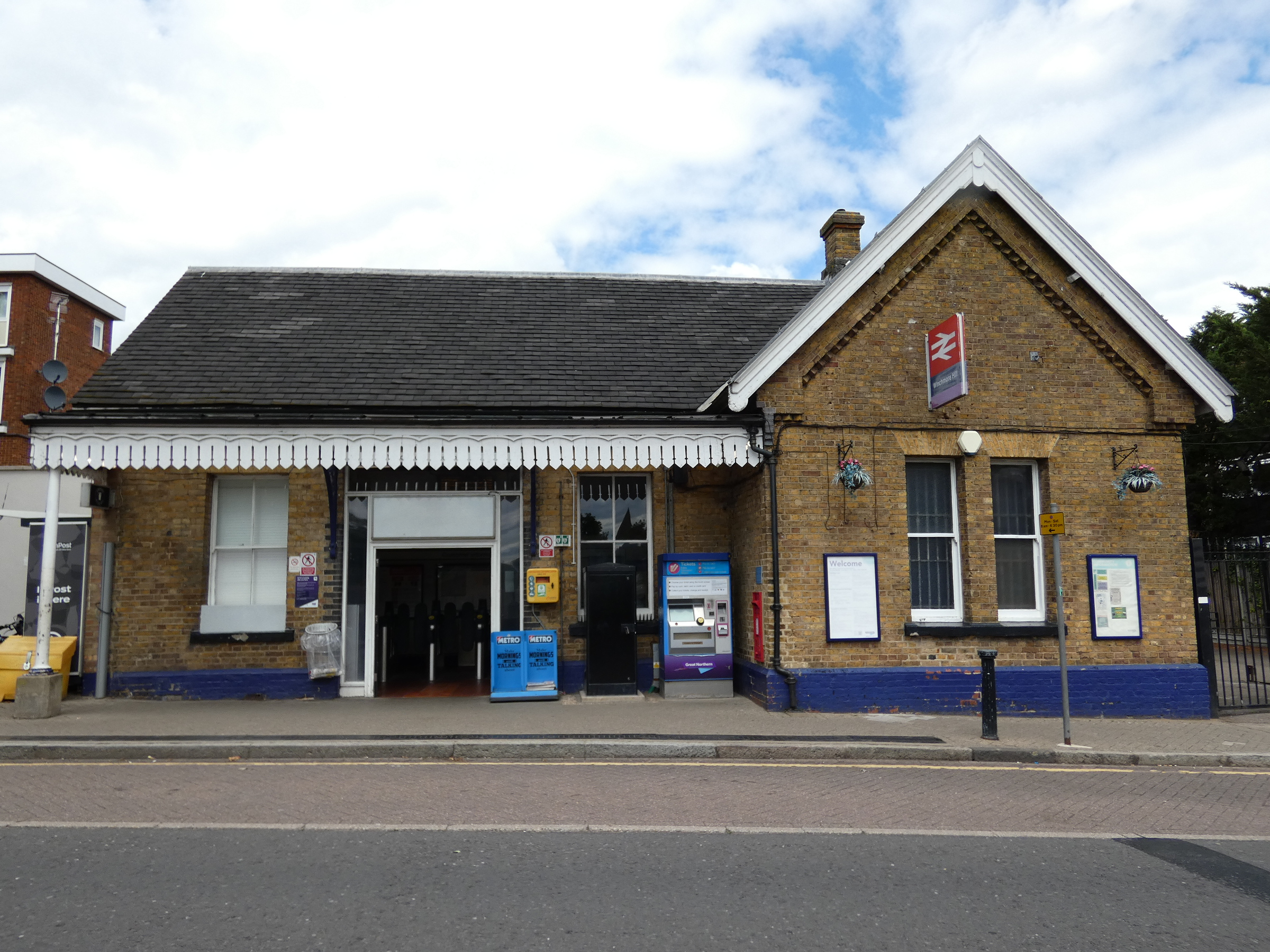
Winchmore Hill Station

In 1865, the Great Northern Railway obtained permission to build a new line from Wood Green to Hertford through Palmers Green and Enfield. However, financial constraints in 1869 led the company to consider Enfield as the northern terminus, with Palmers Green and Winchmore Hill as intervening rural stations. Despite terrain challenges that led to the deaths of five workers, the branch opened on 1 April 1871. The first passenger train through Winchmore Hill helped transform it into a suburb of London. Initially, only 16 trains a day departed from Enfield, mostly heading to Moorgate.

The Capitol Cinema, designed in the Art Deco style by Robert Cromie, opened on 29 December 1929 in Green Lanes. Briefly run by Lou Morris, the cinema was taken over in December 1930 by ABC Cinemas, which operated it until its closure on 5 December 1959. It was demolished the following year. The site was later occupied by the office block Capitol House, occupied by the Inland Revenue (demolished by August 2019).

== Winchmore Hill in the 21st century ==
At the heart of the area is Winchmore Hill Green, a village green surrounded by shops and restaurants. Winchmore Hill also features its own "millionaire's row", Broad Walk, which has been home to many rich and famous individuals.

Of particular note is Grovelands Park, originally a private estate before being partly sold off to the council in 1913. The remaining private section now houses the Priory Clinic, which hosted General Pinochet while he was in the UK awaiting charges from the Spanish government.

Winchmore Hill Sports Club provides the local community with facilities and teams for cricket, football, tennis, hockey, and table tennis.

=== Demography ===
At the 2001 census, Winchmore Hill had 12,225 residents in 4,976 households. 80% of residences were owned by their occupiers. The population was in general rather older than in the rest of Enfield – 38.3% being 45 or over, compared with 35.3% for the borough as a whole.

At the 2011 census, 76% of the ward's population of 13,403 was white (54% British, 18% Other, 4% Irish). The area is also covered by the Bush Hill Park ward which had a population of 13,923. In 2011, the ward was 74.3% White (53.1% British, 16.8% Other White and 3.2% Irish)

== Politics ==
Winchmore Hill is part of the Edmonton and Winchmore Hill constituency.

It is part of the Winchmore Hill ward for elections to Enfield London Borough Council.

== In culture ==
- Argentinian-born composer Juan María Solare wrote in 2001 a piano piece called Winchmore Hill, dedicated to James MacAonghus (who lives in the district); it was premiered by Dorota Niziol in Stuttgart on 28 September 2002, with a choreography by Diana-Maria Sagvosdkina (Studio für BewegungsChiffren) within the frame of the Kulturmarkt Stuttgart.

== Notable residents ==
- Emma Bunton, singer.
- James Caan, entrepreneur
- Alfredo Campoli, violinist, lived at 48, Eversley Park Road.
- Thomas Carte, historian.
- Clem Cattini, drummer.
- Alan Dumayne, local historian.
- Thomas Hood, poet.
- Frank Ifield, singer.
- Myleene Klass, singer.
- Norris and Ross McWhirter, born in Winchmore Hill.
- Keith Moon, drummer.
- Louise Redknapp, singer.
- Cliff Richard, singer and film star of the 1960s, lived in Colne Road, Winchmore Hill, with his family after finding success.
- Elizabeth Sawyer, witch.
- Leslie Smith, businessman.
- Rod Stewart, singer.
- Roy Strong, art historian.
- Melanie Sykes, presenter.
- Sharon Turner, historian.
- Leslie R. H. Willis, engineer.
- Paul Young, singer.

== Education ==
While pupils often travel further afield, the following schools are in the area.

=== State primary ===
- St. Paul's School (Church school)
- Grange Park Primary School
- Highfield Primary School
- Eversley Primary School

=== State secondary ===
- Highlands School
- Winchmore School
- Ashmole Academy

=== Independent middle ===
- Grange Park Preparatory School
- Keble Preparatory School

=== Independent secondary ===
- Palmers Green High School

== Transport ==
=== Railway ===
Greater Thameslink Railway provide services on the electrified railway line that runs from Hertford North through Winchmore Hill station into London. This line connects further south to the tube system at Finsbury Park, Highbury and Islington, Old Street and Moorgate, where it terminates. The nearest London Underground station is at Southgate, which is on the Piccadilly line.

=== Buses ===
Bus routes which serve Winchmore Hill: London Buses routes 125, 329, London Buses route 456 W8, W9, and night route N29.

== Trams ==
An electric tramway along Green Lanes from Palmers Green, developed in 1907, further spurred area development. Although the tramway is long gone, the wide road remains, and the 329 bus (formerly the 29, and before that the 123) follows the tram route from Enfield to Turnpike Lane.

== Nearby places ==
- Southgate
- Grange Park
- Palmers Green
- Enfield Chase
- Cockfosters
- Edmonton
- Oakwood
- Enfield Town
- Bush Hill Park

== Bibliography ==
- The Cresswells of Winchmore Hill, Peter Hodge.
- A History of Winchmore Hill, S. Delvin.
- Winchmore Hill: Memories of a Lost Village, Henrietta Cresswell.
- Memories of Winchmore Hill, Horace G Regnart.
- Fond Memories of Winchmore Hill, Alan Dumayne, 1990.
- A Look at Old Winchmore Hill, Stuart Devlin.
- Southgate and Winchmore Hill: A Short History, David Pam.
- Dr Cresswell's Winchmore Hill, published by the London Borough of Enfield Libraries.
- The Story of Southgate and Winchmore Hill, Walker Round, Wynchgate Press (1906).
