= Winchmore School =

Location
- Laburnum Grove; Winchmore Hill, Greater London, N21 3HS; United Kingdom; 51°37′48″N 0°05′29″W

Information
- Type: Community school
- Established: 1956
- Local authority: Enfield London Borough Council
- Specialist: Arts
- Department for Education URN: 102045 Tables
- Ofsted: Reports
- Head teacher: Jim Owen
- Gender: Mixed
- Age range: 11–18
- Enrolment: 1,859 (2026)
- Capacity: 1,433
- Website: www.winchmore.enfield.sch.uk

Winchmore School is an 11–18 mixed, community secondary school and sixth form in Winchmore Hill, Greater London, England. It was established in 1956 as a secondary modern school and has been a specialist arts college since 2004.

== History ==
Winchmore council school was established in 1914 in Highfield Road for infants and juniors. In 1932, a secondary department was added, which became a secondary modern school after reorganisation following the Education Act 1944. In 1956, the seniors moved to the newly established Winchmore School on the opposite side of Highfield Road. It was converted to a comprehensive school in 1967. In 2001, it was identified by Ofsted as achieving better results than other schools with its students who were of Black-Caribbean origin, who made up 13 per cent of the students at that time.

In the present day the school teaches students mainly from the surrounding areas of Edmonton (N9, N18), Palmers Green (N13), Winchmore Hill (N21), Tottenham (N17) and Wood Green (N22). Although the school is situated in a relatively affluent area it accepts students from a variety of backgrounds with around 30% of students claiming benefits and free school meals. Over 90% of the schools students come from minority ethnic backgrounds with a notable amount students coming from Turkish, Albanian, Jamaican, Somalian and Nigerian backgrounds.

In recent years the school has produced multiple well-known rappers, such as Skepta, JME and Capo Lee. The school is frequently visited by rapper Wrech 32 who carrys out music workshops which aim to inspire the next generation of UK MC's in the Drill, Grime and UK rap scenes.

== Buildings ==
The school is made up of 4 main buildings, two three-floor buildings and two two-floor buildings. The newest building the school currently has on its site is a two-floor building that finished construction in 2024 to accommodate the schools growing sixth-form.

After 1956, the school continued to make use of prefabricated building on the primary school site for many years. It was initially called Winchmore Secondary Modern and its headmaster was Mr Shepherd. Later the school changed its name to Winchmore School.

== Jackson family ==
In 2009 Tito Jackson visited the school and spoke to a group of students. Following this, Katherine Jackson gave a trophy to the school, which the headteacher awarded to a pupil who had "made a great contribution in every sphere of expressive arts".

== Notable alumni ==
- Brian Bennett, drummer, pianist, composer and producer of popular music (when the school was Winchmore Council School)
- Marcus Edwards, footballer
- JME, grime MC, songwriter, record producer, rapper and DJ
- Skepta, MC, rapper, songwriter and record producer
- Kazaiah Sterling, footballer
