= Grange Park Methodist Church =

Methodist Church in Park Drive, Grange Park

Coordinates: 51.641°N 0.0934°W

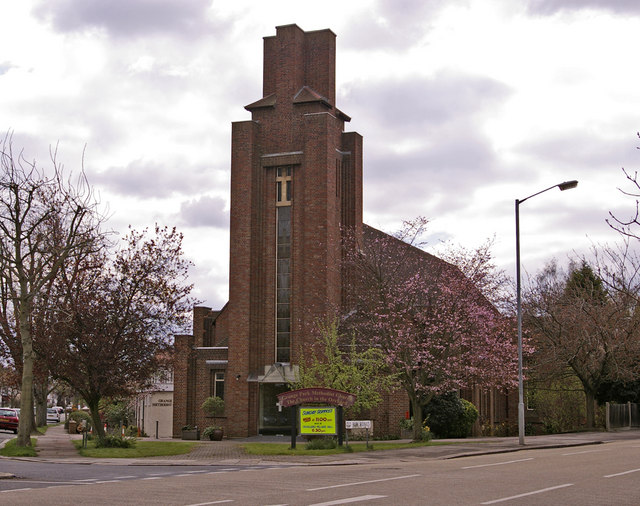
Grange Park Methodist Church

Grange Park Methodist Church, also known as The Church in the Orchard, is an architecturally notable church in the Art Deco style in Park Drive, Grange Park, in the London Borough of Enfield. It was designed by Charles H. Brightiff and opened in 1938.
