= Alan Dumayne =

Alan Dumayne

Alan Peter Dumayne (21 April 1929 – 30 April 1998) was an historian of North London known for his lectures and books on the history of Southgate, Palmers Green, and Winchmore Hill.

== Life ==
Alan Dumayne was born in Harringay on 21 April 1929 before moving with his family to Winchmore Hill in 1933. His father was John A. Dumayne, and his mother was Ruby E. Dumayne, née Bartlett. He was educated at Winchmore Junior School and Southgate County School (1940–46). Dumayne completed two years of national service and married Sheila Dawson in 1952. They lived in Winchmore Hill and later Southgate and had two children, Richard Sydney and Jacqueline Anne. Dumayne was a member of Winchmore Hill United Reformed Church.

Dumayne was a director of his father's building firm but his real enthusiasm was for local history which he credited to the discovery that his new home in Southgate, at Chandos Avenue, was on the site of the grounds of the former Beaver Hall, home to three generations of the Schneider family.

He completed books on the history of Southgate, Palmers Green, and Winchmore Hill, as well as taking a significant number of photographs of these areas and lecturing on local history. In 1990 he was diagnosed with leukaemia. He died on 30 April 1998.

== Selected publications ==
- Southgate: A glimpse into the past. Alan Dumayne, London, 1987. ISBN 0951228609
- Once Upon a Time in Palmers Green. Alan Dumayne, London, 1988. (three editions)
- Fond Memories of Winchmore Hill. Alan Dumayne, London, 1990. ISBN 0951228625
- The Old Borough of Southgate. Alan Sutton, Stroud, 1998. (Britain in Old Photographs) ISBN 0750920009
- The London Borough of Enfield. Alan Sutton, Stroud, 1996. (Britain in Old Photographs) ISBN 0750910275

== See also ==
- David Pam
