= Covert Way =

Protected area in North London, England

Coordinates: 51.661056°N 0.1725°W

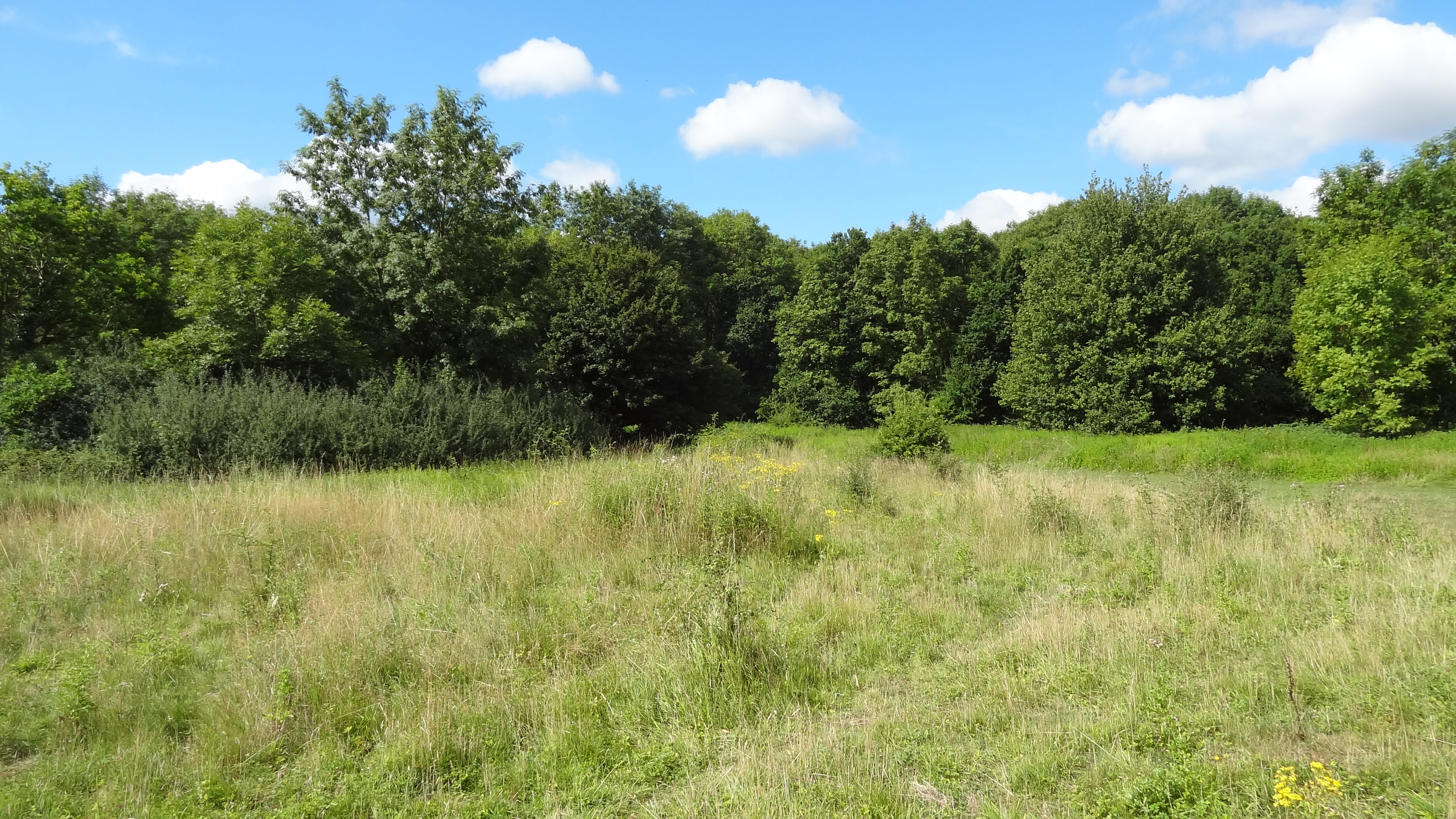
Pasture area in Covert Way

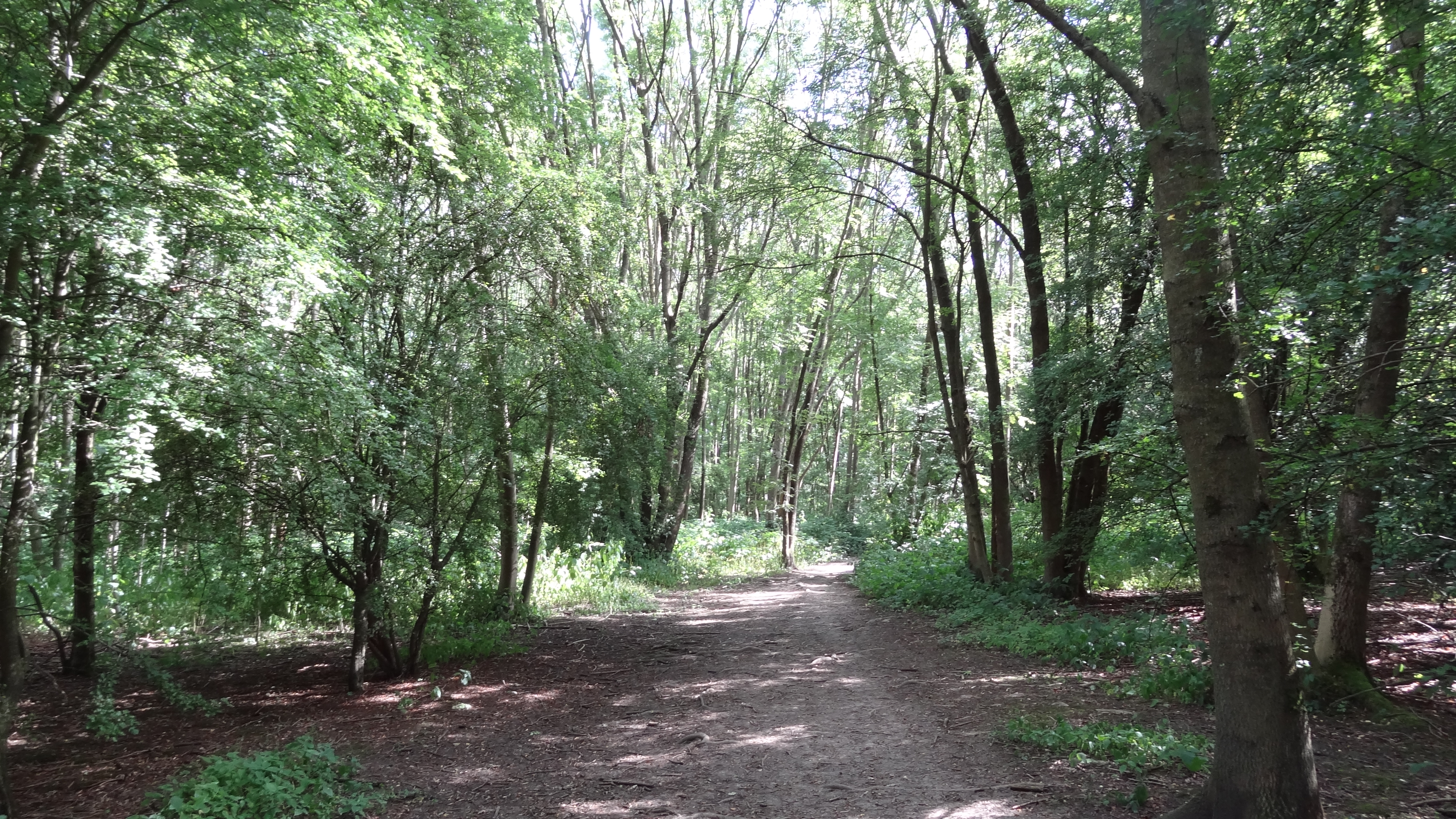
Path in Covert Way woodland

Covert Way is the only Local Nature Reserve in the London Borough of Enfield. It is also part of the Hadley Wood Golf Course and Covert Way Field Site of Borough Importance for Nature Conservation, Grade I, and it has an area of 7 hectares (17 acres). It is on the southern border of Enfield between the road named Covert Way and Monken Hadley Common in Barnet.

Part of the site is semi-deciduous woodland which has woodpeckers and muntjac deer, and butterflies including white-letter and purple hairstreaks. In grassland areas there are the rare adder's-tongue fern and the locally scarce four-spot orb weaver spider.
