= Grovelands Park =

Public park in London, England

Coordinates: 51°37′58″N 0°6′55″W

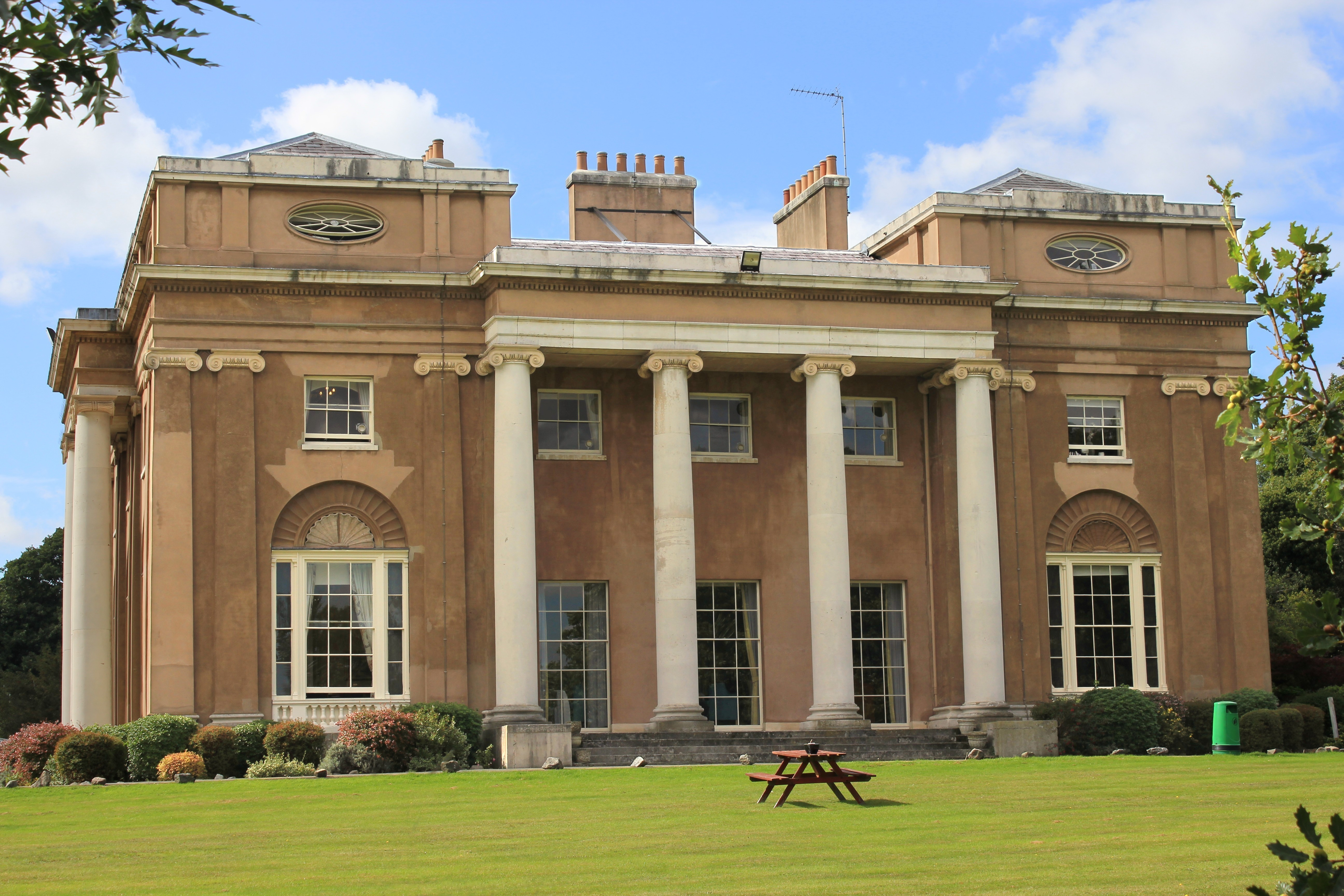
Grovelands House

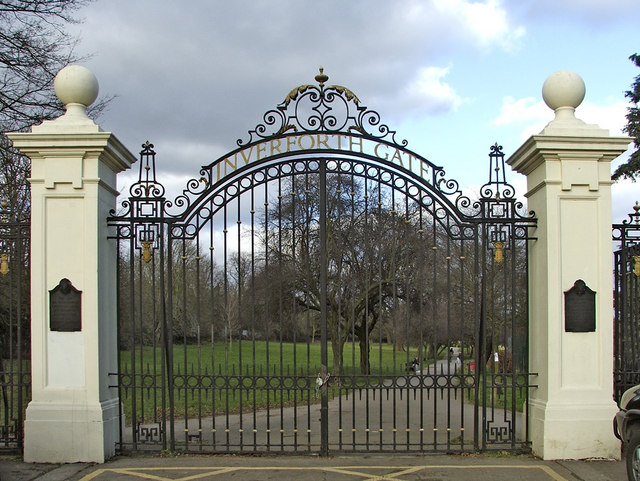
The Inverforth Gate

Grovelands Park is a public park in Southgate and Winchmore Hill, London, that originated as a private estate. The park is Grade II* listed on the Register of Historic Parks and Gardens.

Grovelands, the house on the western side of the park, is Grade I listed on the National Heritage List for England.

== History ==
The mansion, which was initially called 'Southgate Grove', was built in 1797–98 to the designs of John Nash for Walker Gray, a Quaker brewer. The grounds were landscaped by Humphry Repton. In 1816 the building was described as being "a regular building of Ionic order, and presents a fine example of that beautiful style". Lucinda Lambton has called the building an "idiosyncratically flounced, classical villa", and mentions that the owner bought much of the parkland to avoid the sight of other people's chimneys. She goes on to describe the interior: "Inside, there survives one of the most delicate delights in all London: Nash's octagonal dining-room, painted as if you are in a bamboo birdcage, looking out through the bars at the fields, woods and sky."

After Gray's death the property was acquired by John Donnithorne Taylor (connected to the Taylor Walker & Co Brewery), whose family continued to live at Grovelands up to the First World War.

Part of the estate was purchased by the Municipal Borough of Southgate in 1913 to become a public park. The house is part of the Priory Hospital Group. In 1998, General Augusto Pinochet was held under house arrest initially in Grovelands House while a patient at the Priory Hospital.

== Listed and at risk ==
Grovelands Park was designated Grade II* Listed in October 1987, and has been on Historic England's Heritage at Risk Register since 2009. Historic England describe the park as highly vulnerable with "significant localised problems" and the trend of further decline. They believe the issues are caused due to the fragmented management of the park due to the number of landowners. A "historic environment assessment" commissioned by the Enfield London Borough Council in 2008, provided priorities and guidelines for landowners when carrying out "repairs and restoration".

== Planned development ==
In 2013 Enfield Council revealed several concepts to improve the park, including refurbishing existing sports facilities, opening up disused land owned by Thames Water, and the provision of a new primary school.

Enfield Council reassured residents that the park they currently have access to will not be built on or reduced in size. The council has stated that: "Options include locating the new school in the area near to existing tennis courts whilst restoring and extending the existing tennis provision which may involve an artificial turfed surface."

== Flora and fauna ==
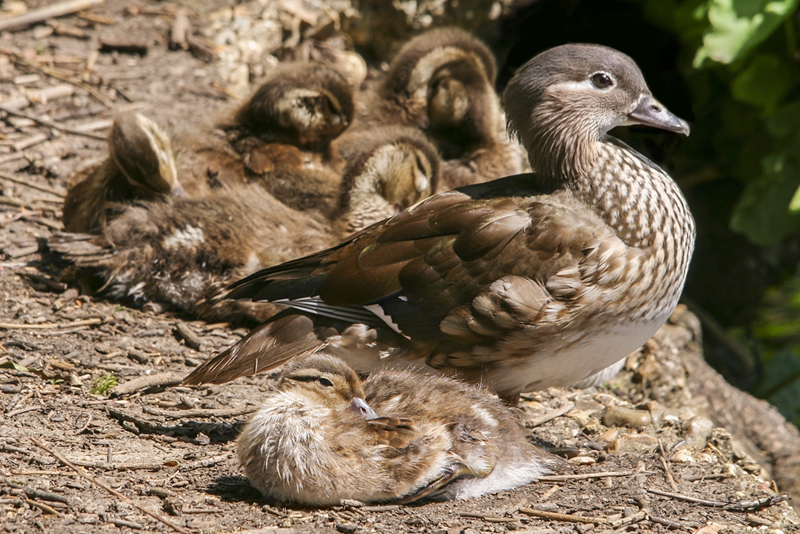
Mandarin duck (Aix galericulata) mother duck with ducklings on the boating lake

The terrapins in the lake were believed to be the descendants of discarded pets that were able to survive and breed. Feral terrapins are a recurring problem in many London waterways.

== Recreation ==
The park is home to a Parkrun.
