= Enfield Town Park =

Park in Enfield, London, England

Coordinates: 51.64918°N 0.08682°W

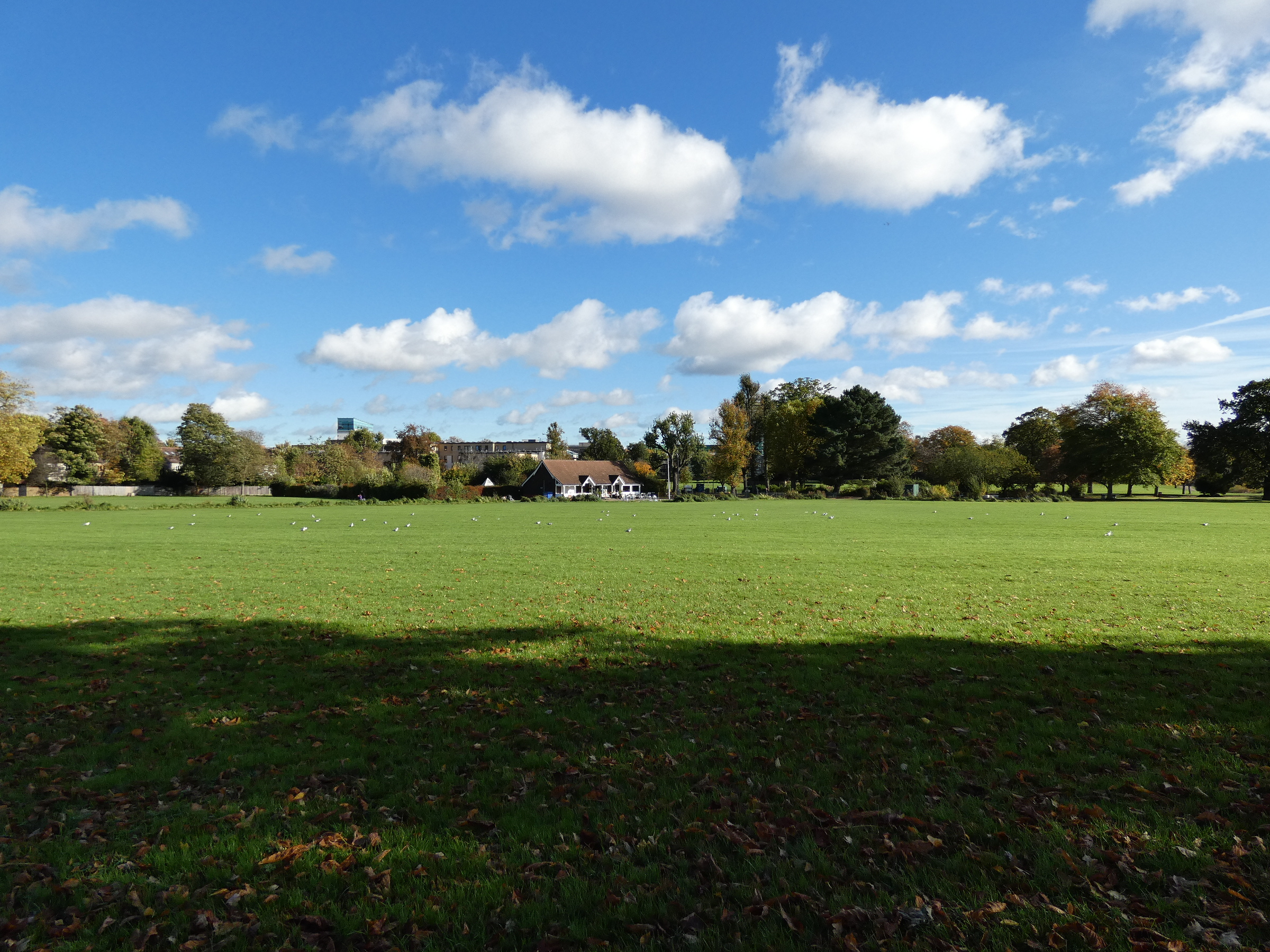
Town Park, Enfield

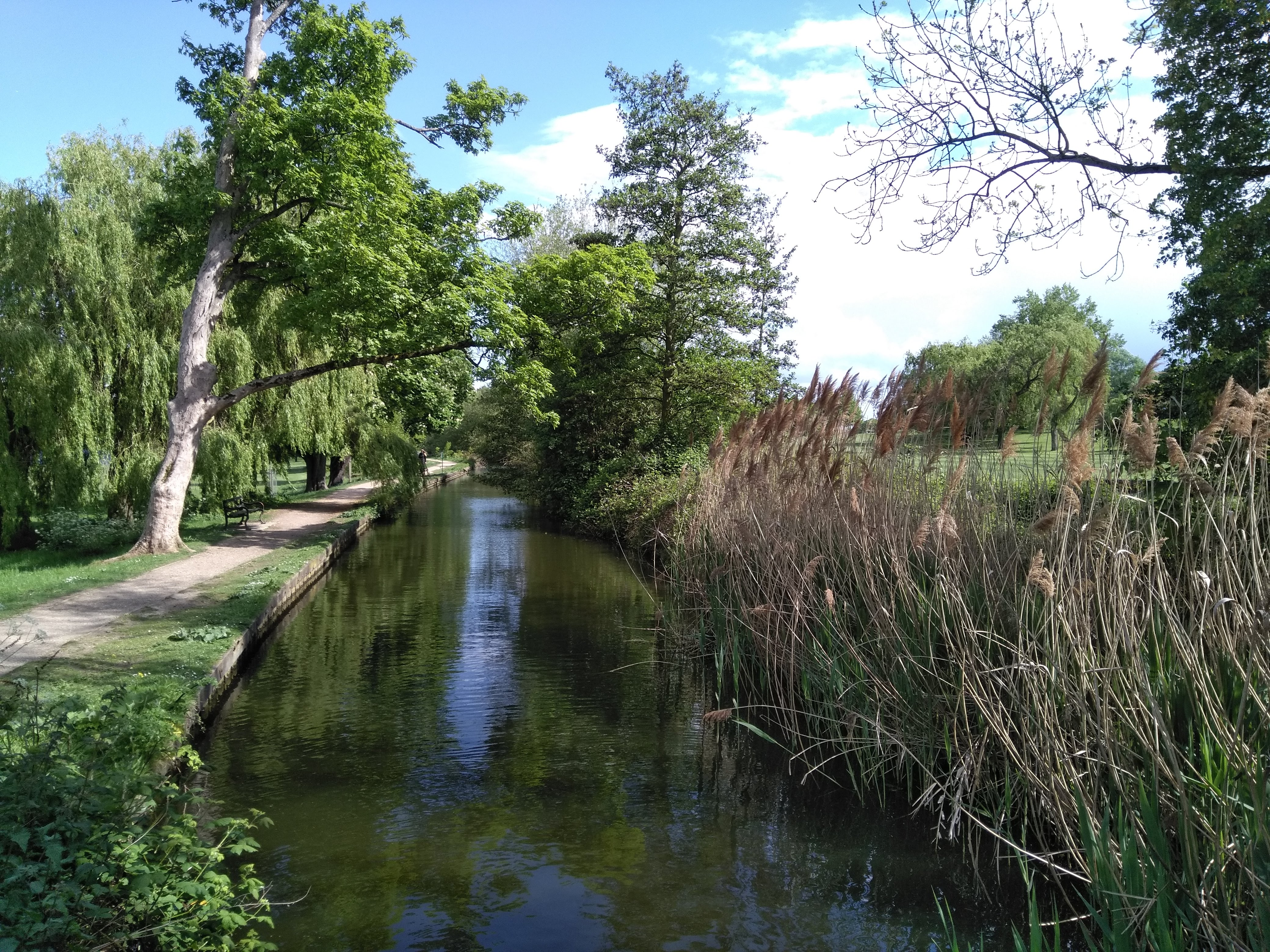
The New River in Town Park

Enfield Town Park is a 9.5-hectare park in the Enfield Town area of the London Borough of Enfield, first opened in 1902. It is the last remaining public open-space of Enfield Old Park.

The New River Loop marks the southern and western boundaries of the park.

In 2023 a memorial to local victims of the COVID-19 pandemic, called Enfield Living Memorial, was inaugurated in the park. It consists of a heart-shaped ring of trees surrounding a metal artwork at its centre.

== See also ==
- Enfield Old Park
