= Winchmore Hill railway station =

National Rail station in London, England

Winchmore Hill
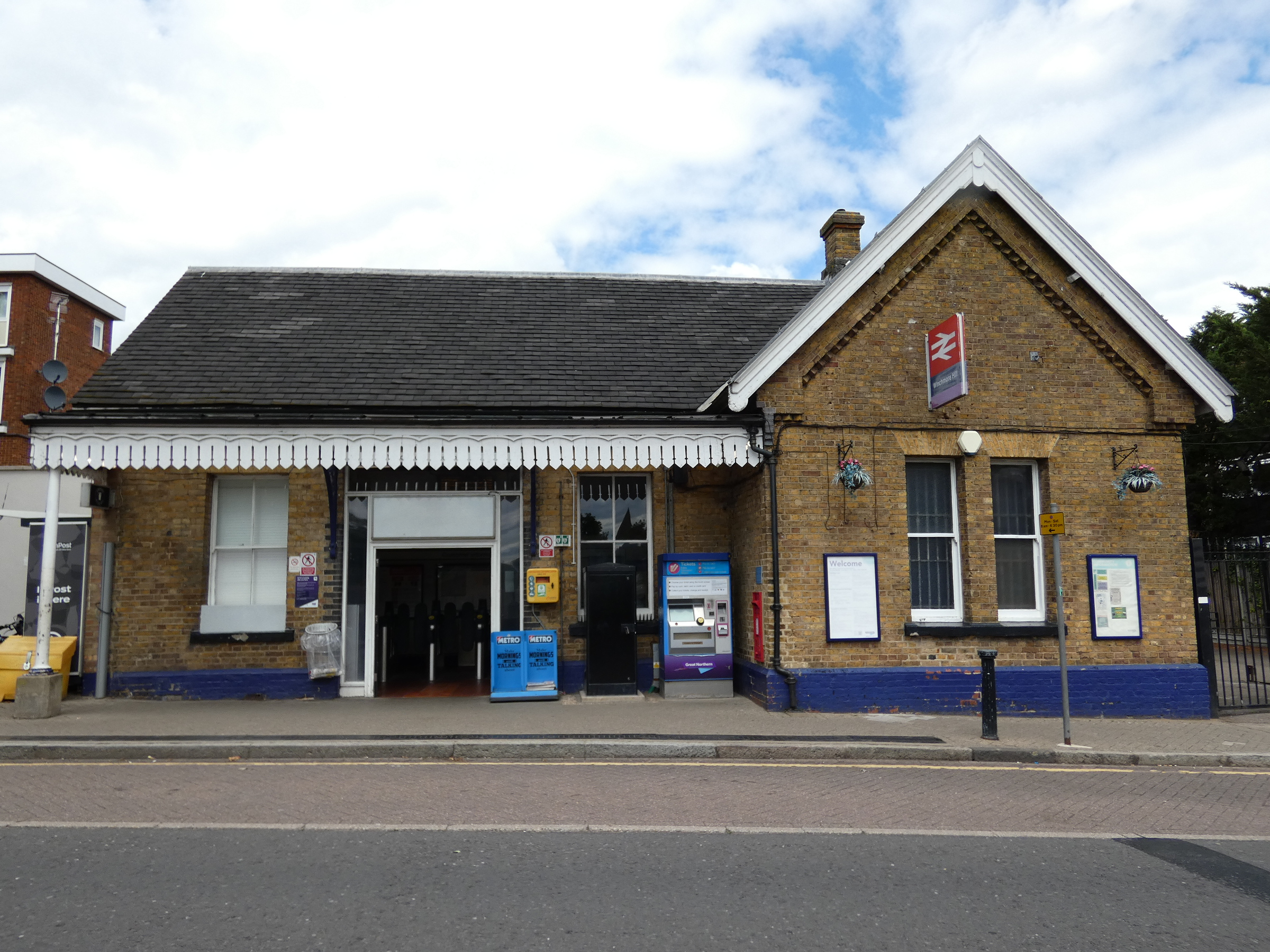
- Winchmore Hill Station
- Interactive map of Winchmore Hill

General information
- Location: Winchmore Hill
- Local authority: London Borough of Enfield
- Managed by: Great Northern
- Station code: WIH
- DfT category: D
- Number of platforms: 2
- Fare zone: 4

National Rail annual entry and exit
- 2020–21: ▼0.356 million
- 2021–22: ▲0.852 million
- 2022–23: ▲1.171 million
- 2023–24: ▲1.269 million
- 2024–25: ▲1.408 million

Key dates
- 1871: Opened

Other information
- External links: Departures; Facilities
- Coordinates: 51.6341°N 0.1013°W

Winchmore Hill railway station is on Station Road (which, before the arrival of the railway, was known as "Middle Lane"), Winchmore Hill in the London Borough of Enfield in North London, England, in London fare zone 4. It is 7 miles 63 chains (7.79 miles, 12.53 km) down the line from London King's Cross on the Hertford Loop Line. The station, and all trains serving it are operated by Great Northern. Originally, upon opening in 1871, the station building was almost identical to that at neighbouring Palmers Green. However, in 1965 the northbound side of the building was demolished due to subsidence. In the 1970s the station boasted, on its southbound platform, a small newsagent and sweet shop, just beyond the base of the stairs down to the platform, but by 1980 this shop had been dismantled.

== Services ==
All services at Winchmore Hill are operated by Great Northern using Class 717 EMUs.

The typical off-peak service in trains per hour is:

- 2 tph to Moorgate
- 2 tph to Stevenage via Hertford North

Additional services call at the station during the peak hours.

Preceding station	National Rail	Following station
Palmers Green	Great Northern Hertford Loop Line	Grange Park

== Developments ==
- Oyster pay and go arrived at this station on 2 January 2010.

== Connections ==
London Buses routes W9 and 456 serve the station.
