= Grange Park Preparatory School =

Location
- 13 the Chine; Grange Park; London, N21 2EA; England; 51.64075°N 0.09553°W

Information
- Type: Other Independent School
- Established: 1924
- Founder: Mary and Louise Billings
- Local authority: Enfield
- Department for Education URN: 102062 Tables
- Head teacher: Mr Gavin Biston
- Gender: Mixed
- Age: 3 to 11
- Colours: Blue and Yellow
- Website: https://www.gpps.org.uk/

Grange Park Preparatory School (GPPS) is an independent school for girls and boys aged three to eleven.

Situated in The Chine in the Grange Park area of Enfield, the school was founded in 1924 and still occupies its original site. The school consists of two buildings on the same site. The current Headteacher is Mr. Gavin Biston.

It was founded in 1924 as the Grange Park High for Girls.

== Structure ==
The original House is now home to Years 4, 5 and 6, the KS2 library and the computer suite, as well as the school's administrative offices.

The Lower School has the form rooms for the rest of the school, nursery, the school hall, the KS1 library, the science and art facilities, the kitchen and the playgrounds. The school has had a historic past, with a very old Hall.

Grange Park Preparatory School is now part of the inspired Learning Group of schools.
