= John Donnithorne Taylor =

Member of brewing family (1798–1885)

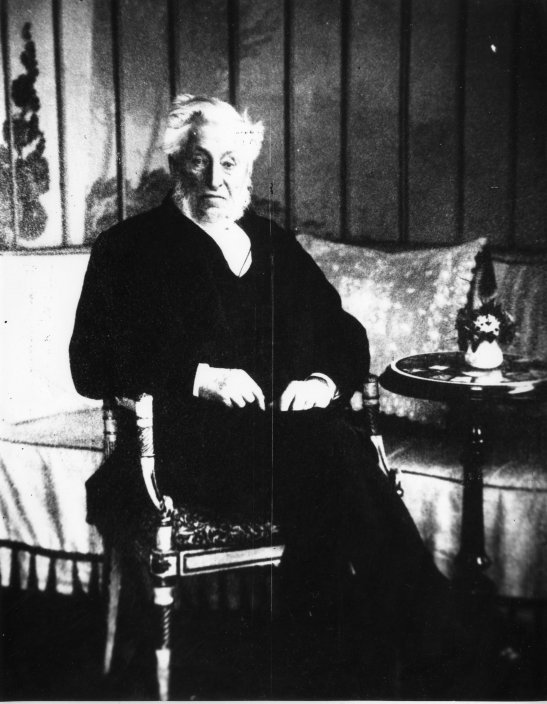
John Donnithorne Taylor

John Donnithorne Taylor (1798–1885) was a member of the Taylor-Walker brewing family and the owner of Grovelands House.

In the 1830s, Mr and Mrs Taylor were involved in a legal case in which Mrs Taylor requested the restitution of conjugal rights.

Around 1840 he purchased Cullands Grove house and estate and merged the grounds into the adjoining Grovelands estate and demolished the house.
