= Enfield Chase =

Former common in Enfield, London

Coordinates: 51.65589°N 0.09793°W

- Location within Greater London
- London borough: Enfield
- Ceremonial county: Greater London
- Region: London
- Country: England
- Sovereign state: United Kingdom
- Post town: ENFIELD
- Postcode district: EN2
- Police: Metropolitan
- Fire: London
- Ambulance: London
- London Assembly: Enfield and Haringey

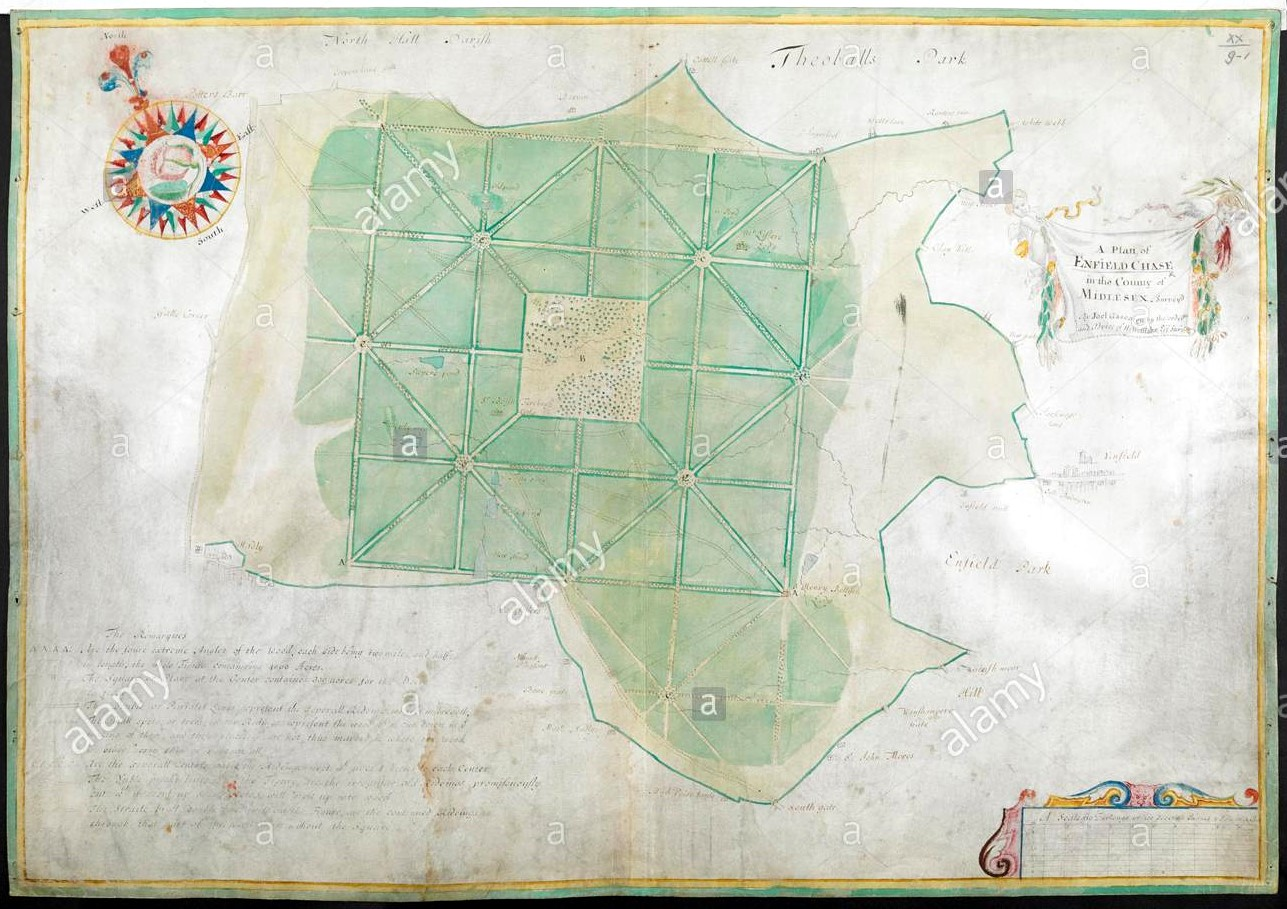
A Plan of Enfield Chase in the County of Middlesex Survey'd by Joel Gascoign, by the order and advice of H. Westlake. Esqr. Survr. A scale of 10 furlongs. 1700.

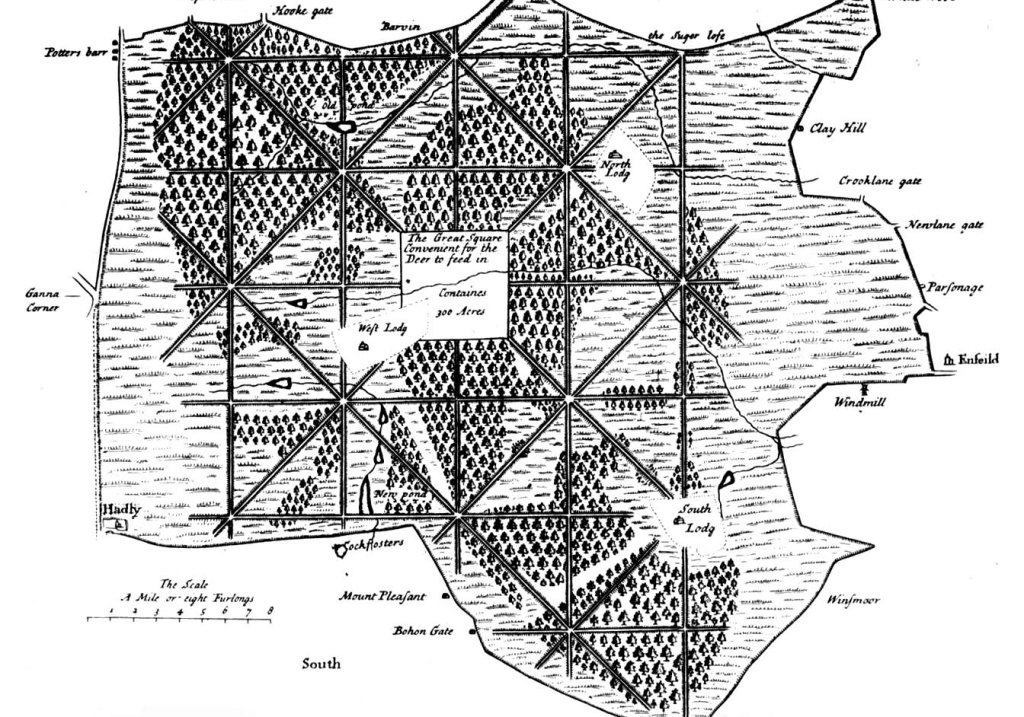
Map from Hugh Westlake's survey of Enfield Chase in 1700

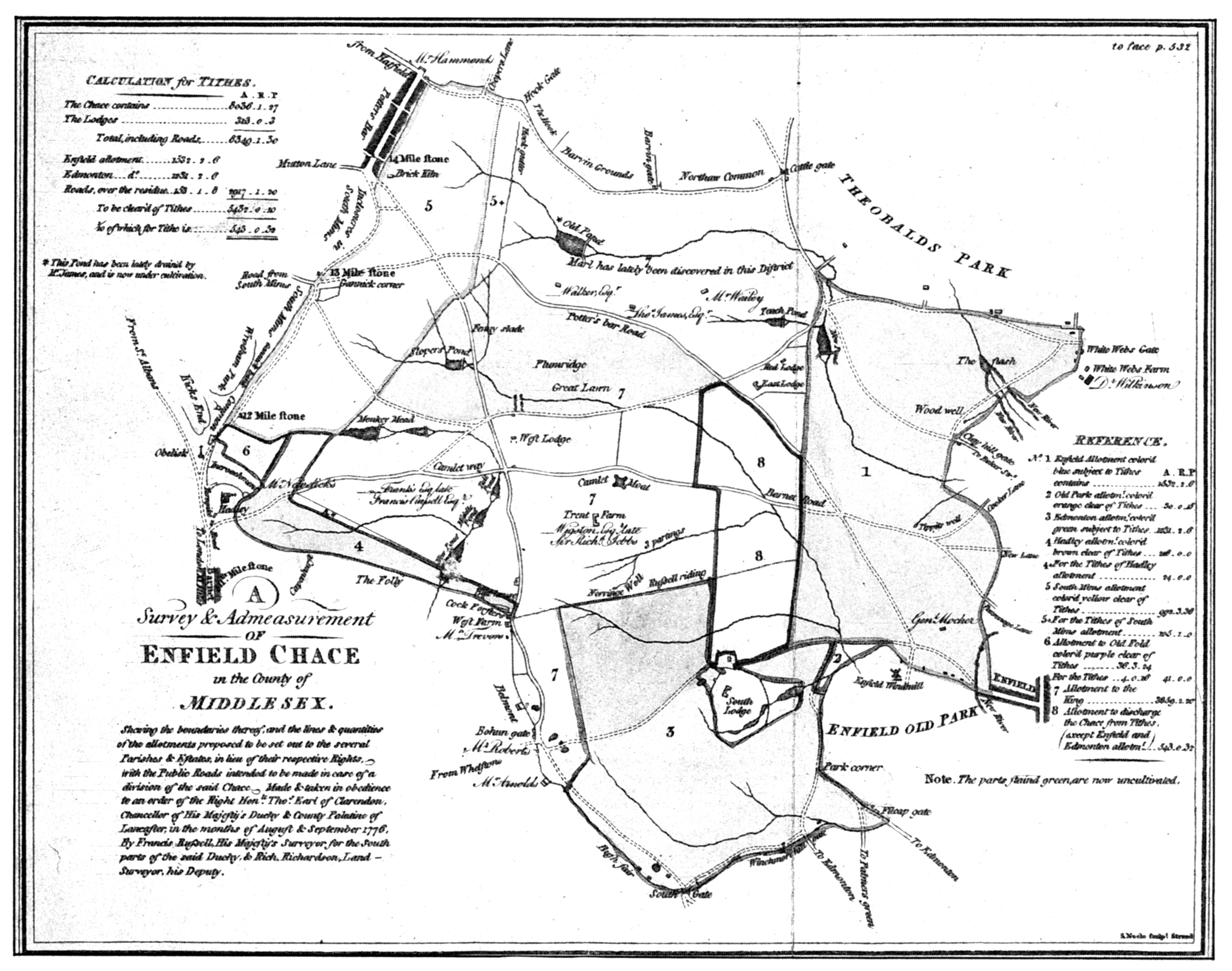
A Survey and Admeasurement of Enfield Chase in the County of Middlesex by F Russell and Richard Richardson, 1776/77.

Enfield Chase is an open space in the London Borough of Enfield, North London. Historically, the name applied to a large common occupying the western part of the ancient parish of Enfield, extending from Monken Hadley in the west to Bulls Cross in the east, and from Potters Bar to Southgate.

Since 1994 the term 'Enfield Chase' has applied to the Enfield Chase Heritage Area of Special Character; a part of the former common area – largely owned by the London Borough of Enfield – that was never developed for housing and other urban uses.

The area was owned by a landlord, for many centuries the Duchy of Lancaster, who held Forest Rights and other rights such as the right to a certain amount of extracted wood. Local commoners also had wood extraction rights and grazing rights which were vital to their subsistence. Although the Chase was legally a Forest, the land was not woodland but wood-pasture; grazing land with a pollard and other trees set within it. Pollarding was a sustainable way that commoners could harvest wood from living trees in a way that did not kill them, but instead indefinitely extended their life span.

In the 1500s the balance of rights between the landowner (the Duchy of Lancaster) and the common rights of local people broke down, and Enfield Chase became a byword for socio-economic conflict. This mainly took the form of the Duchy taking more profit from the Chase at the expense of the commoners.

In 1659, parliament sold extensive areas of the Chase to wealthy and influential figures. The commoners tore down the fences and fought soldiers hired by the new landowners to enforce the new arrangements. Despite several inhabitants people being killed by musket fire, the people of Enfield overwhelmed the soldiers and saved Enfield Chase for another hundred years

In the 1700s, the rich and powerful 'rangers' of the Chase used their influence to help secure the Black Act of 1723, which made poaching and many other crimes punishable by death. Local communities in which offences took place faced collective punishment through reparations to the landowner.

The Chase was enclosed (privatised) in 1777 to stimulate economic growth and to end criminality in the Chase. Ancient common rights including access, grazing and wood collection were extinguished, and the land was given over to farms and private parks.

Much of the area enclosed for agriculture was urbanised in the mid-20th century; alarm at London's sprawl led to extensive areas of farmland, plus private parks such as Trent Park and Whitewebbs Park being brought into public ownership so they could be preserved for the benefit of the people of Enfield. Much of the publicly owned open space may now be built on due to projects such as a large new town at Crews Hill and Tottenham Hotspur's planned new training facility on part of Whitewebbs Park.

== History ==
=== Before Enfield Chase – Domesday and the Forest of Middlesex ===
Domesday returns for Middlesex as a whole indicate that the county was around 30% wooded (much of it wood-pasture) in 1086, about double the English average. This would have been lower in the lower land, close to rivers that made it more attractive for farming, and higher in other parts of the county.

The area that would become known as Enfield Chase is likely to have been part of the Forest of Middlesex, an area under forest law which is likely to have had a high proportion of woodland. The citizens of the City of London held the hunting rights. The Forest of Middlesex was abolished (removed from forest law) by Henry II in 1218. This removed some of the protections the woods and common land had from encroachment by agriculture. No longer part of the much wider Forest of Middlesex, Enfield Chase became a legal forest in its own right.

=== Etymology ===
Enfield Chase was recorded as Enefeld Chacee in 1325 and chace of Enefelde in 1373, from the Middle English chace, meaning "a tract of ground for breeding and hunting wild animals". The term Chase particularly applies to places, like Enfield Chase, where the forest rights are held by someone other than the monarch.

In a charter of 1166–89 the hamlet of Southgate, sited around what is now Southgate Underground station, is referred to. It takes its name from its location at the South Gate of the old hunting ground, later known as Enfield Chase.

=== Ownership and management ===
The chase was established by Geoffrey de Mandeville around 1136-1144. It appears it was not known as Enfield Chase until the early 14th century, and was known as Enfield Wood or Enfield Park before that time. The name Enfield Chase is first recorded in 1325.

It was referred to as 'Parcus Extrinicus' (Latin, 'the Outer Park') to distinguish it from the older and smaller Enfield Old Park ('Parcus Intrinsicus' ('the Inner Park') which was mentioned in the Domesday Book as a park and was later used for rearing game to be released into the adjacent Chase.

In the middle ages a forest was an area managed for the breeding and hunting of deer, and was not necessarily wooded. Generally speaking the crown held the forest (hunting) rights, but in a few cases - such as Enfield Chase the forest rights were privately held. Enfield Chase was a forest but it was not a woodland, the habitat was wood-pasture - grazing land interspersed with trees. Many of these trees were pollards.

Enfield Chase covered 8,349 acres (3,379 ha) (in 1777), the higher western half of the ancient parish of Enfield. It was part of an area of wood-pasture that extended nine miles northward to Hatfield in Hertfordshire.

While the landowner held the forest (hunting) and a number of other rights, the land was primarily managed as a common, with various grazing and wood collection rights enjoyed by commoners of Enfield, Edmonton, Monken Hadley and South Mimms. Areas of common land across both areas was inter-commoned meaning that commoners of all districts enjoyed rights in each. This arrangement is thought to derive from sometime before the Norman Conquest when the four districts are thought to have formed a single territorial unit. Much of the wood collection rights was by a sustainable process called pollarding which indefinitely extended the life of the tree.

Common rights are older than forest law which was a Norman imposition, and where these co-existed (most commons were not in legal forests) there was significant conflict between these two sets of rights. This was partly resolver by the Charter of the Forest, a sister document to the Magna Carta, which was produced in 1217. Forest rights were curtailed and the continued exercise of common rights within areas of forest guaranteed.

=== Period of stability ===
For hundreds of years the Chase was owned by the Mandeville and then the de Bohun families before passing to the Duchy of Lancaster in 1471. The Duchy held the manor of Enfield and the Forest rights in Enfield Chase. For the first hundred years, the Duchy was a very conservative landlord and made no attempt to infringe on common rights or to enclose any common land (as the landowners of Edmonton Manor had).

It is believed that Princess Elizabeth (later Queen Elizabeth I) often hunted on the Chase after she was granted the estate of West Lodge Park by her brother Edward VI in 1547.

=== Sustained social conflict ===
In most forests (most forests being royal forests), there was a stable balance between the forest rights of the crown and the common rights of the local people. Enfield Chase experienced sustained social conflict as the Duchy of Lancaster, which had the forest rights, did not have the crown's traditional scruples about oppressing the tenantry. For centuries they sought to expand their own rights at the expense of the commoners (those who held common rights). The Duchy of Lancaster was (and is) a crown estate, but operated at arms length, in a similar way to a modern quango.

By mid 1500s population was rising (but was probably not at pre-Black Death levels) leading to pressure on natural resources. Competition for resources between the Duchy and commoners increased. This was exacerbated by the corruption of Duchy officials taking far more wood than they were entitled and selling it on outside the parish without giving local people the customary first refusal.

Another problem for Enfield Chase was the enclosure of some common land in Edmonton; as Edmonton and Enfield intercommoned (shared each others common lands) the loss of common in one area increased pressure on common land in both. These factors combined to leads to a centuries long downward trend in the number of pollard and other trees in that wood-pasture environment.

At the same time, the rights of the Duchy were being infringed through poaching of deer by gentry and commons alike.

The Duchy's response to the competition for resources included rationing, for the first time, the right to grazing and wood collection common rights. taking more than one's allowance became a crime.

In 1659, during the Interregnum, desperate for funds, parliament sold off large parts of the chase to a number of parliamentarian army officers and other influential figures. Outraged at the loss of their ancient feudal rights, local commoners tore down the fences that the incomers had erected, so that they could graze their cattle there as before.

The 'Intruders', as they were referred to, hired well armed off-duty parliamentarian soldiers to enforce their acquisitions. The soldiers shot and stole the commoner's sheep, and also shot cows and horses. Confrontations followed with the soldiers shooting and killing several locals, before being overwhelmed by the people of the parish. Several of the soldiers were captured and beaten, ending up at Newgate prison.. The Chase was secured for Enfield (and neighbouring intercommoned parishes) for another hundred years.

In the 1700s, the ongoing social conflict meant Legal Forests, particularly Enfield Chase and Waltham Chase in Hampshire, came to have a bad reputation in parliament, especially among modernising Whigs who already viewed them inefficient and anachronistic.

The situation in Enfield Chase, and the lobbying of Enfield Chase rangers (men who had bought lucrative ‘ranger’ positions in the Duchy organisation and wanted to maximise return on their investment) such as Sir Basil Firebrace and Major General John Pepper was a major factor in leading Robert Walpole's Whig government introducing the Black Act of 1723. This was the most significant piece of legislation among many which together are known as the Bloody Code. The Black Act (and the Bloody Code generally) made hundreds of offences punishable by death, including relatively petty offences such as poaching and being in a forest in disguise (typically camouflage). In addition suspects who did not hand themselves in could be executed without trial.

Under the Act, communities were subject to collective punishment for poaching and related crimes. The Hundred in which the crime took place (Enfield Chase was in Edmonton Hundred) was made to pay reparations to the landowner through a special levy. The Act was not fully repealed until 1823.

=== Enclosure of 1777 ===
Enfield Chase Act 1777
- Act of Parliament
- Parliament of Great Britain
- Long title: An Act for dividing the Chace of Enfield, in the County of Middlesex; and for other Purposes therein mentioned.
- Citation: 17 Geo. 3. c. 17
- Territorial extent: Great Britain

Dates
- Royal assent: 27 March 1777
- Commencement: 31 October 1776 (Note: Start of session.)
Other legislation
Amended by	Statute Law (Repeals) Act 1978; Statute Law (Repeals) Act 1993

Status: Amended

Text of statute as originally enacted

By the Enfield Chase Act 1777 (17 Geo. 3. c. 17), the Chase was enclosed (privatised), and common rights, including the right of access, wood collection and grazing, were extinguished. The Chase ceased to exist as a legal entity. Only Monken Hadley Common, covering around 2% of Enfield Chase, continued to be managed as a common. Enclosure was carried out on the grounds of increasing agricultural output and to stop it being a 'nuisance to the public' as a site of criminality. Agreement to enclosure was secured by compensating the wealthier stakeholders. The poor were not consulted or compensated.

The Survey and Admeasurement of Enfield Chase drawn up by the Duchy of Lancaster surveyor Francis Russell in 1776/7, showed the Chase then covering an area of 8,349 acres (3,379 ha). The Chase extended from Monken Hadley in the west to Bulls Cross in the east, and from Potters Bar to Southgate.

The map showed how the Chase would be divided among the following authorities:

To the King	3,218 acres (13 km^{2})
To the Lodges	313 acres (1.3 km^{2})
To the Enfranchised	6 acres (24,000 m^{2})
To the Manor of Old Ford	36 acres (150,000 m^{2})
To the Manor of Old Park	30 acres (120,000 m^{2})
To South Mimms Parish	1,026 acres (4 km^{2})
To Hadley Parish	240 acres (1.0 km^{2})
To Enfield Parish	1,732 acres (7 km^{2})
To Edmonton	1,231 acres (5 km^{2})
To Tithe Owners	519 acres (2.1 km^{2})

In 1777 George III leased the central part of the Chase to Sir Richard Jebb, his favourite doctor, as a reward for saving the life of the King's younger brother, the then Duke of Gloucester. This land later became Trent Park.

=== The Chase after the enclosure and division of 1777 ===
The opening of Enfield station on the Great Northern line in 1871 (renamed Enfield Chase station in 1924 to avoid confusion with Enfield Town station) resulted in the first period of sustained housebuilding on former Chase lands. This began with 'artisan's cottages' built along Chase Side in the 1880s and accelerated after the opening of new stations at Gordon Hill and Crews Hill in 1910.

In the mid 20th century, areas at Southgate, Oakwood and Hadley Wood were developed. The grounds of South Lodge were acquired by developers Laing, who built a new housing estate in the period 1935-1939. Boxer's Lake and Lakeside, once part of South Lodge, are the only remaining open spaces.

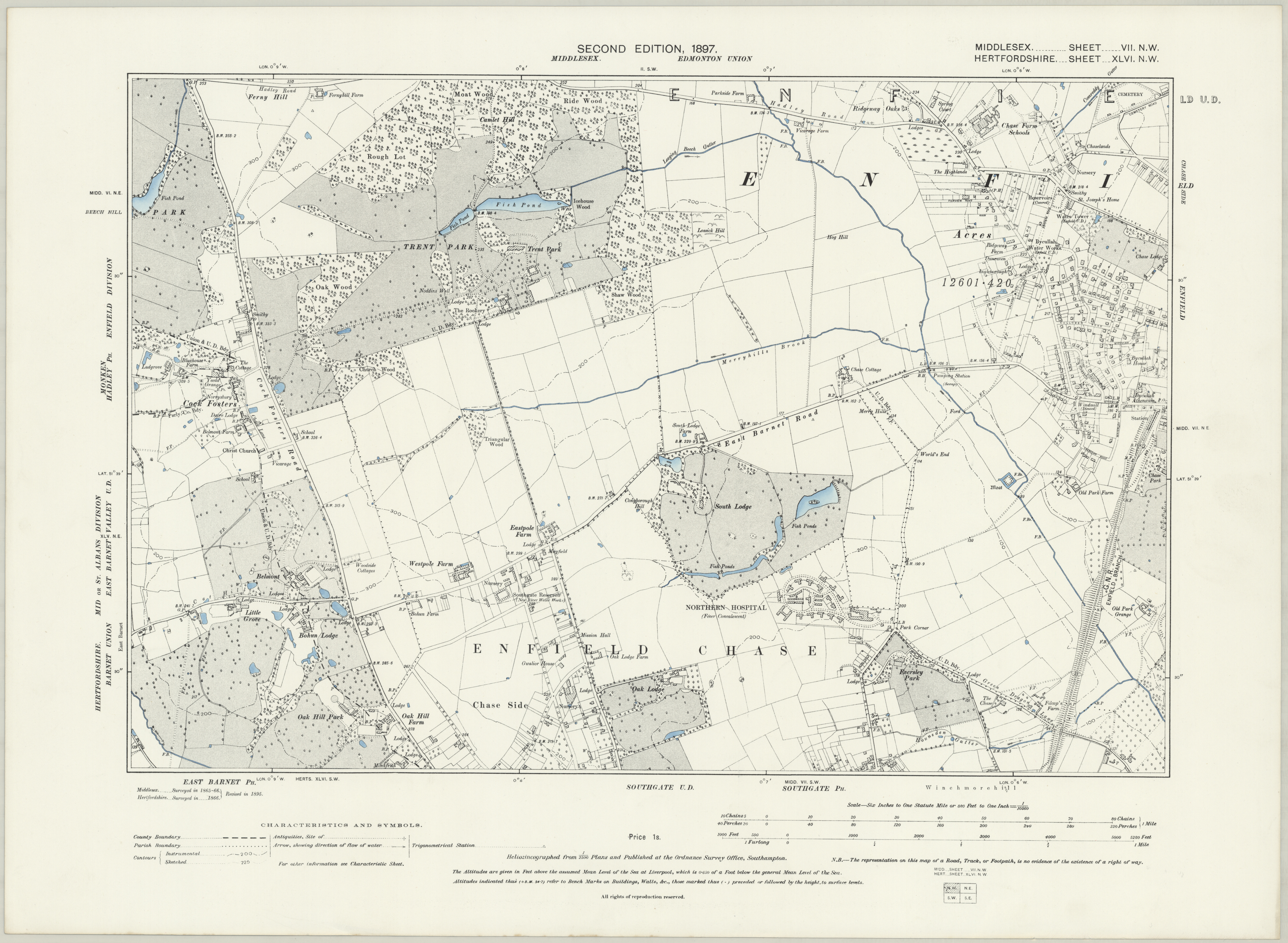
Part of Enfield Chase in 1897. Trent Park is to the north. South Lodge (one of the three Enfield Chase Keeper's lodges) was redeveloped for housing in 1935–9. Eastpole Farm was demolished to allow the construction of the Piccadilly Line. To the east beyond World's End, the site of the former Old Park Keeper's lodge is visible, surrounded by a moat. Reproduced with the permission of the National Library of Scotland https://maps.nls.uk/index.html

Areas that remain undeveloped include Trent Park, Whitewebbs Park, Hadley Common, Fir and Pond Wood near Potters Bar, and the valleys of the Salmons Brook, Turkey Brook and Merryhills Brook, as well as golf courses at Hadley Wood and Whitewebbs Park. Remnants of the Chase now within the urban area of London include Chase Green near Enfield Town and Boxer's Lake Open Space in Oakwood.

== Enhancing the undeveloped areas ==
In the 1930s the countryside of Enfield and surrounding areas was being rapidly urbanised. In 1936–7 Middlesex County Council purchased around 4,000 hectares in order to protect it for the benefit of the people of Enfield. Trent Park, Whitewebbs and Forty Hall became public parks, with farmed areas leased to tenant farmers and designated as part of the protective Green Belt. This land subsequently passed into the ownership of the modern London Borough of Enfield.

=== Enfield Chase Restoration Project ===
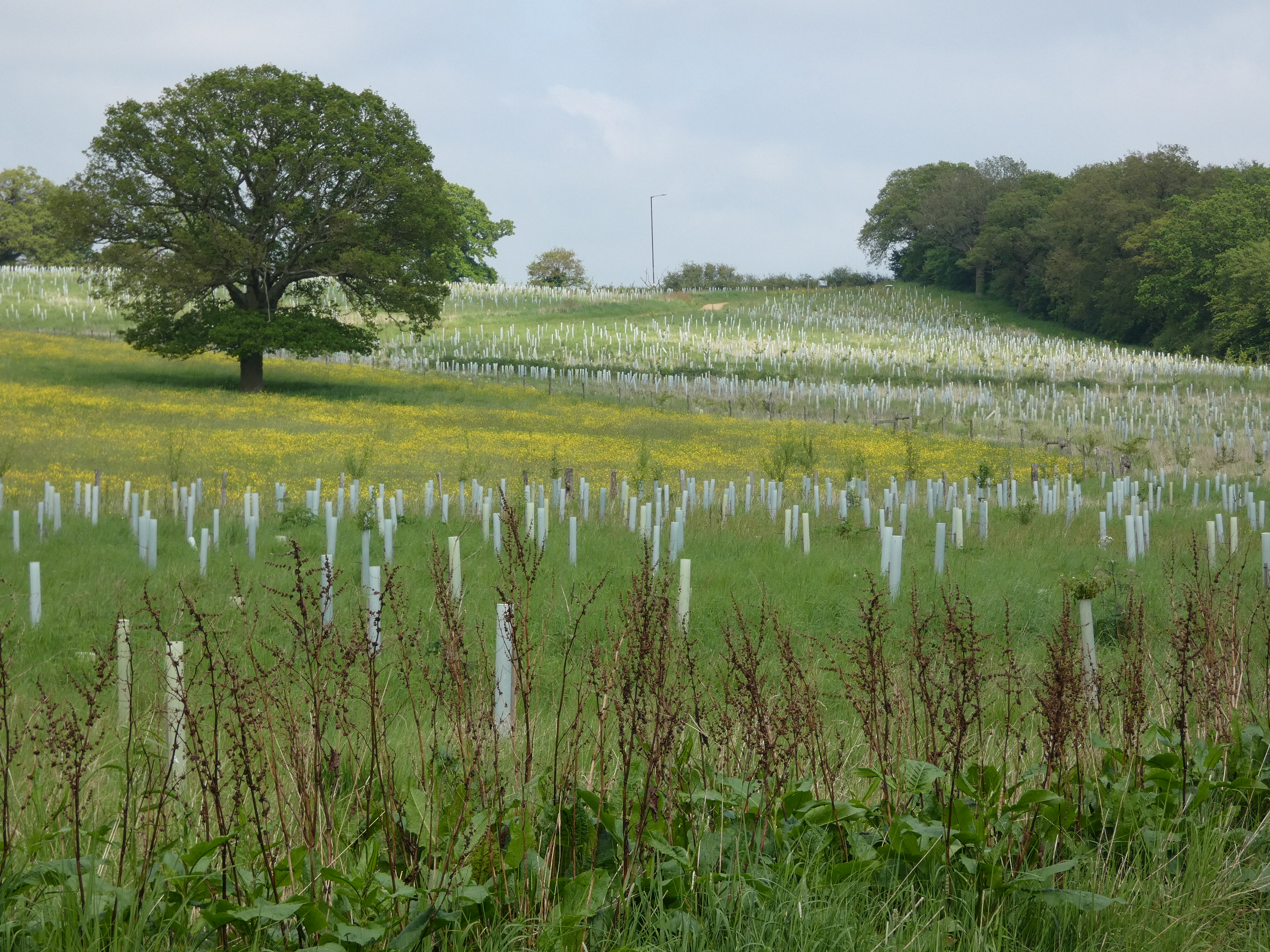
Enfield Chase Restoration Project pictured May 2024

The first phase of the project, which commenced in autumn 2020 and was completed in 2022, involved the planting of 100,000 trees. It cost £1.3million in total, with £748,000 provided by the Mayor of London, £425,000 by the Forestry Commission, and £150,000 from the council itself. In May 2022, the Enfield Chase Restoration Project won an award at the London Tree and Woodland Awards. In April 2023, the Greater London Authority announced that it would provide another £500,000 in funding for further tree planting and improvements to footpaths in Enfield Chase. The Friends of Enfield Chase group of local volunteers help to plant and maintain trees and undertake other practical conservation activities in the parts of the former Chase that are being 'restored'.

=== Designation as an Area of Special Character ===
The Enfield Chase Heritage Area of Special Character (AoSC) was designated in 1994, following the recommendation of the Countryside Commission, English Nature, English Heritage and the London Ecology Unit, based on its combined landscape, historical and nature conservation interests. The AoSC is divided into a number of 'character areas' including the Salmons Brook Valley, the Turkey Brook Valley, the Merryhills Brook Valley, Clay Hill, the Theobalds Estate South, Whitewebbs and Forty Hall, Hornbeam Hills South (adjoining Hadley Wood) and Trent Park. The AoSC was designated in order to protect the existing character of Enfield Chase as an area comprising woodlands, streams, designed parklands and enclosed farmland.

The Enfield Development Management Policies Development Plan Document (a statutory planning document), adopted in 2014, states in policy DMD84 that "new development within the Areas of Special Character will only be permitted if features or characteristics which are key to maintaining the character of the area are preserved or enhanced."

== Modern threats and harms ==
=== Tottenham Hotspur training ground ===
In February 2025 the Enfield Council Planning Committee approved an application for Enfield Council to lease Premier League Tottenham Hotspur Football Club 17 hectares so that they could expand their training ground into Whitewebbs Park. The scheme was criticised because 121 trees would be cut down and public access to the fenced-off land would be removed.

=== The Whitewebbs Oak ===
In early April 2025, the Toby Carvery in Whitewebbs Park hired tree surgeons to fell several trees within the park including an oak tree that was 400 to 500 years old. They claimed the tree was dead and therefore a health and safety issue. Toby leases historic Whitewebbs House from Enfield Council, with Tottenham Hotspur having a legal option to lease the land in future. The origin of the Whitewebbs Oak was as a pollard tree growing within Enfield Chase, providing a renewable source of pollard wood regrowth for the commoners of Enfield, before the enclosure of Enfield Chase (and the associated abolition of common rights) in 1777.

=== Planning policy – draft Enfield Local Plan ===
In June 2021 Enfield Council published for public consultation a draft Local Plan which proposed development within large parts of the Area of Special Character. These areas included the following proposed development sites within undeveloped countryside of Enfield Chase:

- Land at Chase Park: 59.74 hectares proposed for approximately 3,000 new homes on greenfield/Green Belt land at Vicarage Farm and the Merryhills Way, land south of Enfield Road, and an extension at part of Rectory Farm owned by Enfield Council (pages 84–87; 347). The draft Policy states "development should facilitate the rewilding at Enfield Chase" (point 12, page 85).
- Land at Crews Hill: 82.4 hectares proposed for approximately 3,000 new homes including at Crews Hill Golf Course (owned by Enfield Council, designated as a Site of Borough Importance for Nature Conservation). (pages 75–780; 346)
- Land between Camlet Way and Crescent Way: 11.05 hectares of land owned by the Duchy of Lancaster (partly designated as a Borough Site of Importance for Nature Conservation) proposed for approximately 160 new homes (page 364)
- Land East of Junction 24: 11.08 hectares of land owned by Enfield Council, proposed for a minimum of 30,550 sqm employment floorspace (light and general industrial, storage and distribution) including a co-ordinated employment offer on adjacent land also owned by Enfield Council within the Borough of Hertsmere in Hertfordshire (page 374).

In July 2021 the National Park City Foundation complained that Enfield Council was using the National Park City concept, mentioned several times in the draft Local Plan, as a 'bargaining chip' in Green Belt housing plans.

In September 2022 the Council announced that a timetable for the next steps in the development plan would be published "early in 2023". However, as of May 2023 no timetable had been published. In May 2023 it was reported that cross-party talks to consider Green Belt development proposals had collapsed.

=== Crew's Hill new town ===
In Autumn 2025, the government announced that a new town would be built at 'Crews Hill and Chase Farm'. The new town would include more than 20,000 houses, taking up significantly more land than proposed in the local Plan.

== See also ==
- Francis Russell (died 1795)

== References and sources ==
Sources

- Paine, M (2022) A History of Enfield Chase. The Enfield Society.
- Pam, D (1984) The Story of Enfield Chase. The Enfield Society.
- Delvin, S. (1988) A History of Winchmore Hill. Hyperion Press. ISBN 0-7212-0800-2.
- Newby, Herbert W. (1949) "Old" Southgate. London: T. Grove.
- Williams, Sally (2011) Notes on the Lodges and Estates of Enfield Chase, London Parks and Gardens Trust
