= Hugh Westlake =

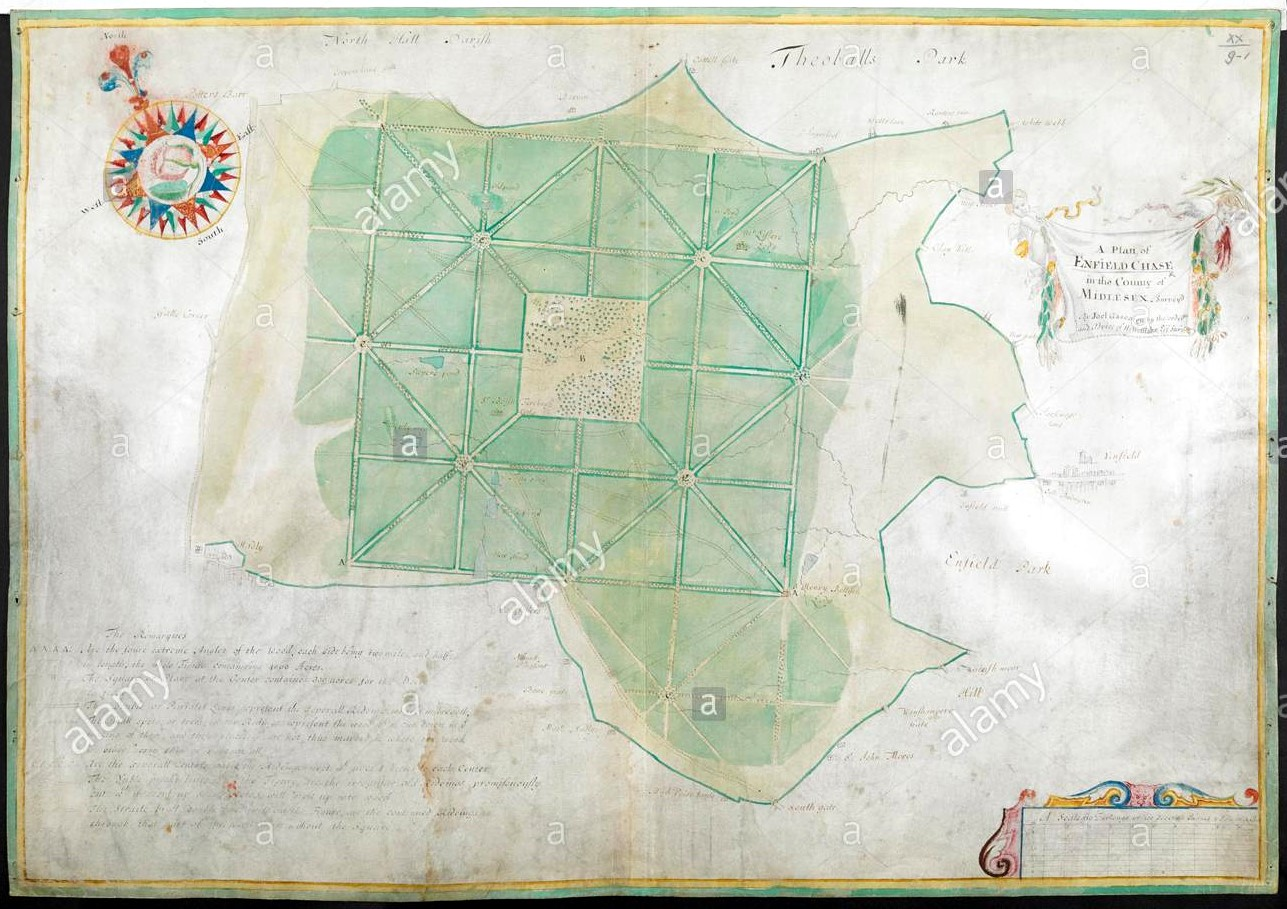
A Plan of Enfield Chase in the County of Middlesex Survey'd by Joel Gascoign, by the order and advice of H. Westlake. Esqr. Survr. A scale of 10 furlongs. 1700.

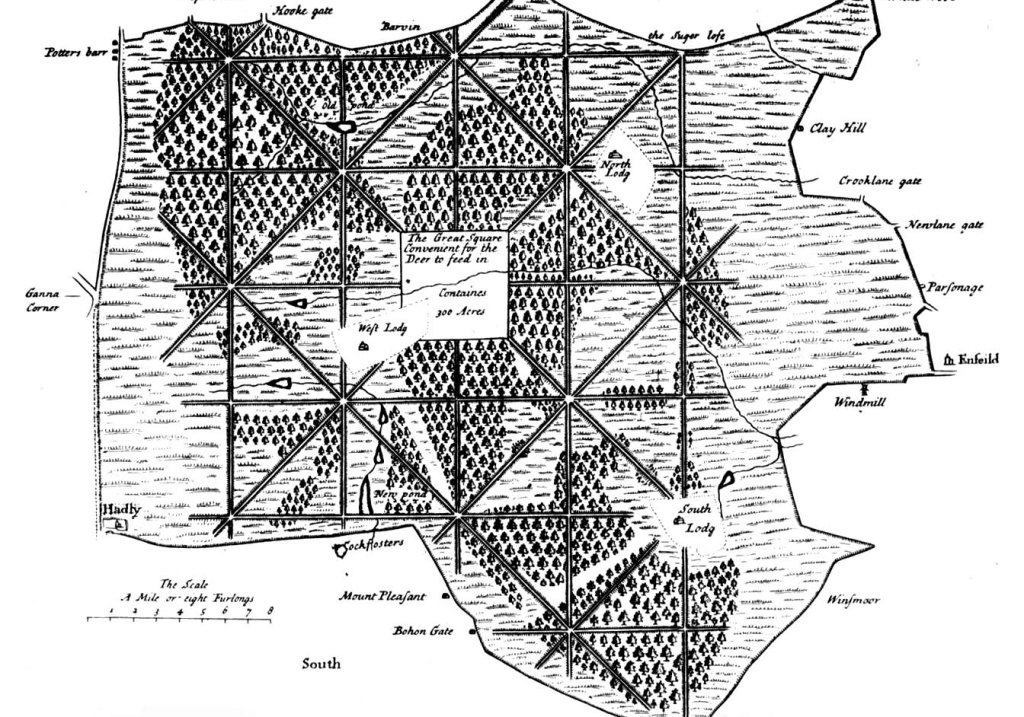
Map from Hugh Westlake's survey of Enfield Chase in 1700

Hugh Westlake (c.1656 - after 1700) was a barrister of the Middle Temple and the Surveyor of the Woods for the Duchy of Lancaster.

== Early life ==
Hugh Westlake was born around 1656.

== Career ==
Westlake was a barrister of the Middle Temple and the Surveyor of the Woods for the Duchy of Lancaster. In 1698, or slightly after, he carried out a survey of the royal hunting ground of Enfield Chase in order to allow the felling of timber for the creation of new ridings and a lawn of 300 acres in the centre for deer to feed in. As a result of this survey a new map was created of the Chase, one of the few to exist, and one of the last before enclosure of the Chase in 1777.
