= Kilburn Grange Park =

Park in Kilburn, London

Coordinates: 51°32′38″N 0°11′51″W

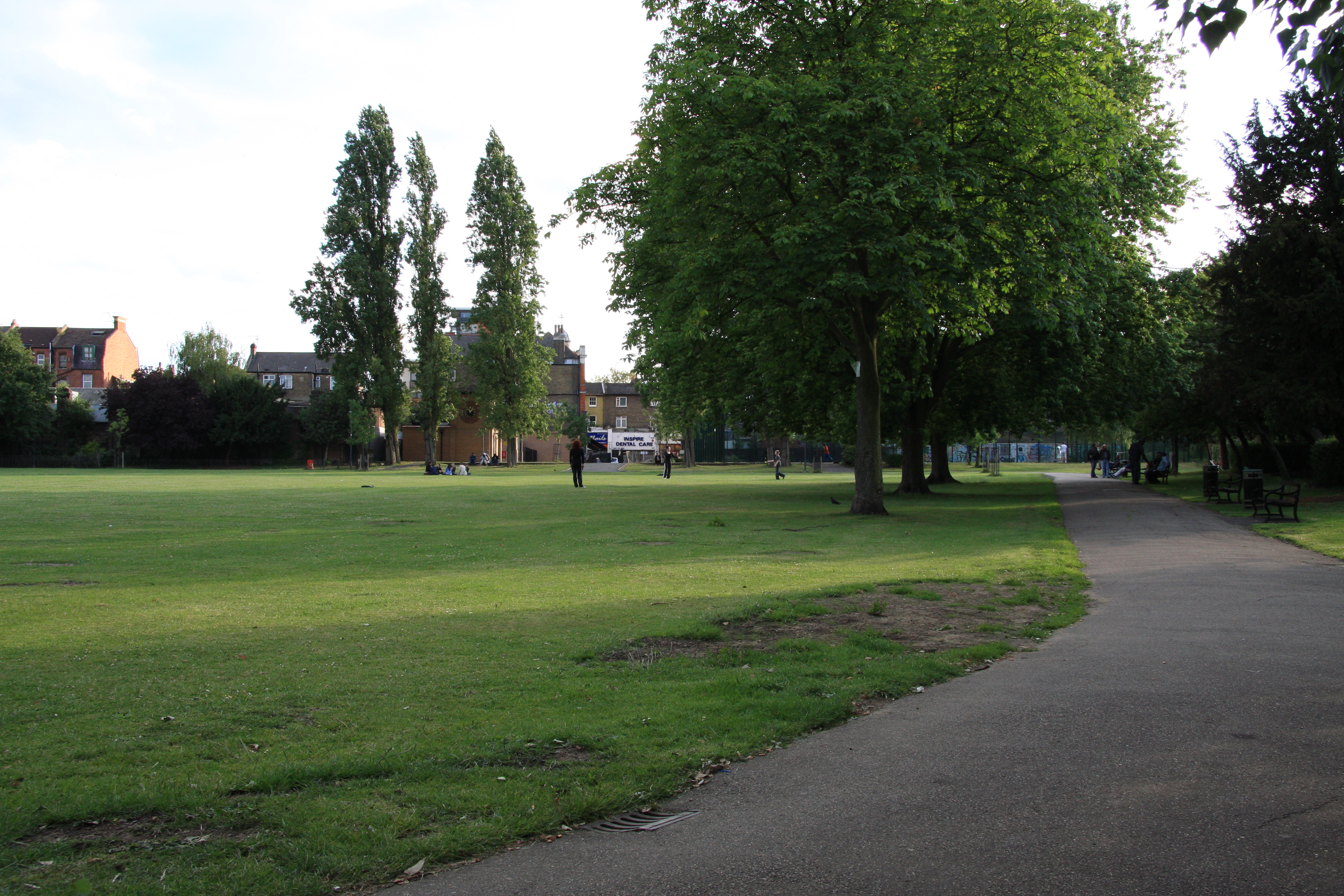
Kilburn Grange Park

Kilburn Grange Park is a 3.2 hectares (7.9 acres) open space in Kilburn, north-west London adjacent to Kilburn High Road. It is administered by the London Borough of Camden and includes a children's playground, basketball court, outdoor gym equipment and tennis courts.

The park first opened in 1913 having previously been part of the Grange estate.
