= Grange Park railway station =

National Rail station in London, England

Grange Park
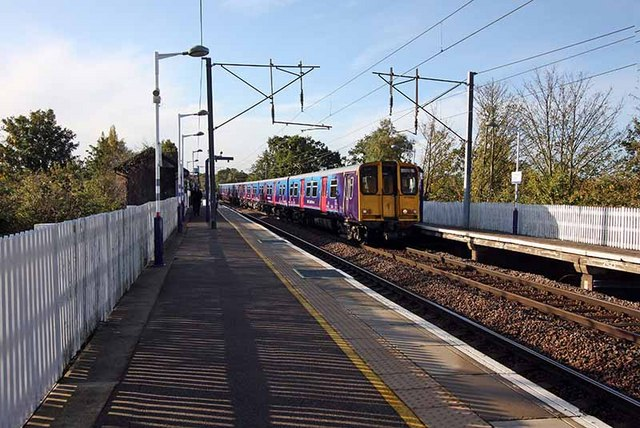
- Interactive map of Grange Park

General information
- Location: Grange Park
- Local authority: London Borough of Enfield
- Managed by: Great Northern
- Station code: GPK
- DfT category: E
- Number of platforms: 2
- Fare zone: 5

National Rail annual entry and exit
- 2020–21: ▼91,862
- 2021–22: ▲0.251 million
- 2022–23: ▲0.370 million
- 2023–24: ▲0.411 million
- 2024–25: ▲0.493 million

Key dates
- 4 April 1910: Opened

Other information
- External links: Departures; Facilities
- Coordinates: 51.6431°N 0.0969°W

Grange Park railway station is situated just off The Grangeway, Grange Park in the London Borough of Enfield, north London, in London fare zone 5. It is 8 miles 35 chains (8.44 miles, 13.58 km) down the line from London King's Cross on the Hertford Loop Line. The station and all trains serving it are operated by Great Northern. Although located on the original 1871 route between Wood Green (now known as Alexandra Palace) and Enfield, this station opened in 1910 at the same time as the line was extended northwards from Enfield to Cuffley.

== Services ==
All services at Grange Park are operated by Great Northern using Class 717 EMUs.

The typical off-peak service in trains per hour is:

- 2 tph to Moorgate
- 2 tph to Stevenage via Hertford North

Additional services call at the station during the peak hours.

Preceding station	National Rail	Following station
Winchmore Hill	Great Northern Hertford Loop Line	Enfield Chase

== Connections ==
London Buses route W9 serves the station.
