= Grange Park, Enfield =

Suburb in London, England

Coordinates: 51.6493°N 0.103°W

Grange Park
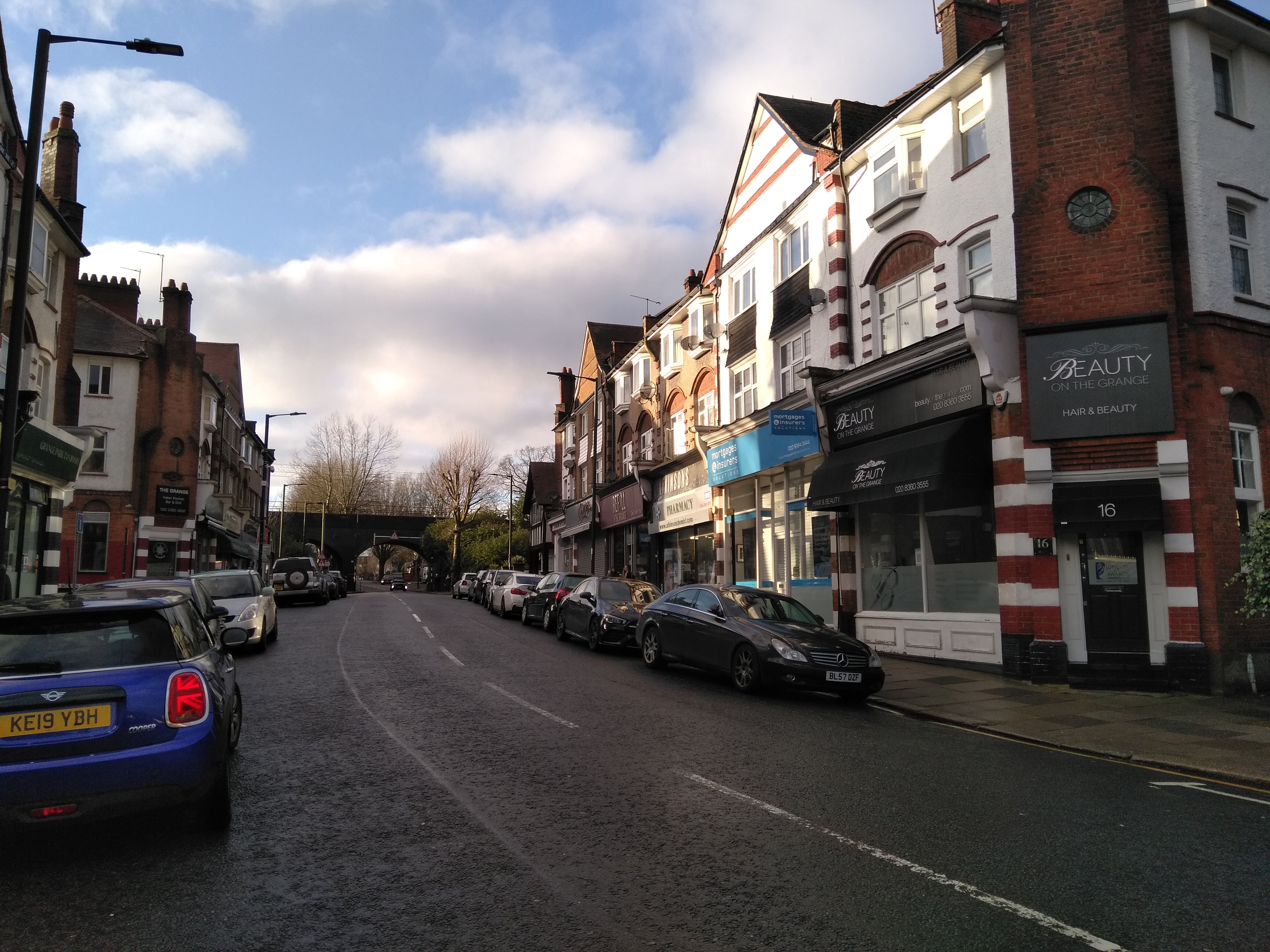
- The Grangeway in Grange Park

- Location within Greater London
- OS grid reference: TQ313962
- London borough: Enfield
- Ceremonial county: Greater London
- Region: London
- Country: England
- Sovereign state: United Kingdom
- Post town: LONDON
- Postcode district: N21
- Dialling code: 020
- Police: Metropolitan
- Fire: London
- Ambulance: London
- UK Parliament: Edmonton and Winchmore Hill
- London Assembly: Enfield and Haringey

Grange Park is a suburban part in the London Borough of Enfield, Greater London in United Kingdom. It is served by Grange Park railway station. Grange Park is located between Enfield Town to the north, Bush Hill to the east, Southgate and World's End to the west, and Winchmore Hill to the south. The area was largely developed in the early 20th century on the site of Enfield Old Park.

In addition to housing, Grange Park has a retail and commercial area around The Grangeway, a street located between Old Park Ridings and Vera Avenue. This commercial zone includes the railway station and a public house, the Gryphon. There are two schools: Grange Park Primary School and Grange Park Preparatory School. The area has two churches: St. Peter's Church of England and Grange Park Methodist Church (The Church in the Orchard). An annual Boxing Day Tug of War takes place.

== Etymology ==
Named from Old Park Grange (marked thus on the Ordnance Survey map of 1877) which was in Old Park (also 1887) earlier the oulde park 1658, Old Bull Park 1822, from Middle English grange 'outlying farm where crops are stored'.

== Politics ==
Grange Park is part of the Edmonton and Winchmore Hill constituency for elections to the House of Commons of the United Kingdom.

Grange Park is part of the Grange Park ward for elections to Enfield London Borough Council.
