= Rammey Marsh Lock =

Lock in the London Borough of Enfield, England

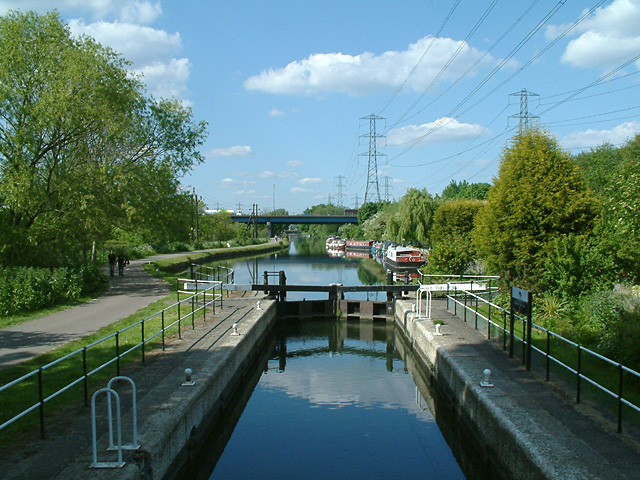
- Rammey Marsh Lock looking north towards the M25 road bridge
- Interactive map of Rammey Marsh Lock
- 51.678184°N 0.012073°W
- Waterway: River Lee Navigation
- County: London Borough of Enfield; Greater London
- Maintained by: Canal & River Trust
- Operation: Manual
- First built: 1864
- Length: 85 feet (25.9 m)
- Width: 16 feet (4.9 m)
- Fall: 3 feet 3 inches (1 m)
- Distance to Bow Creek: 12.3 miles (19.8 km)
- Distance to Hertford Castle Weir: 14.0 miles (22.5 km)

Rammey Marsh Lock (No 12) is a lock on the River Lee Navigation at Enfield, London, England. The area adjacent to the lock is known as Rammey Marsh and close to the River Lee Flood Relief Channel.

== Etymology ==
Rammey Marsh is marked thus on the Ordnance Survey map of 1887, named from Ramhey 1538, Rammey 1610, probably 'island (of dry ground in marsh) where rams are pastured', from Old English ramm and ēg.

== History ==
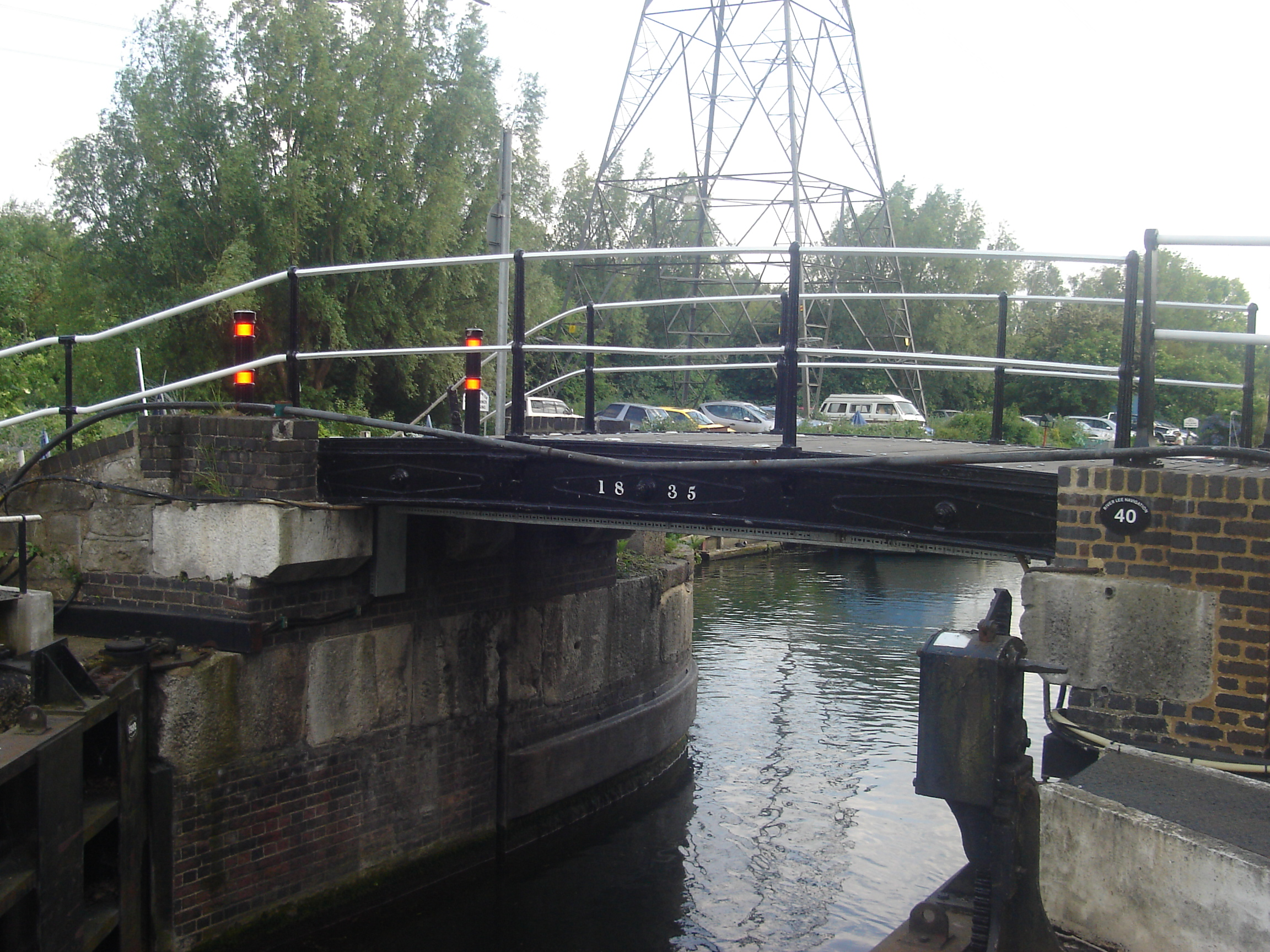
The footbridge

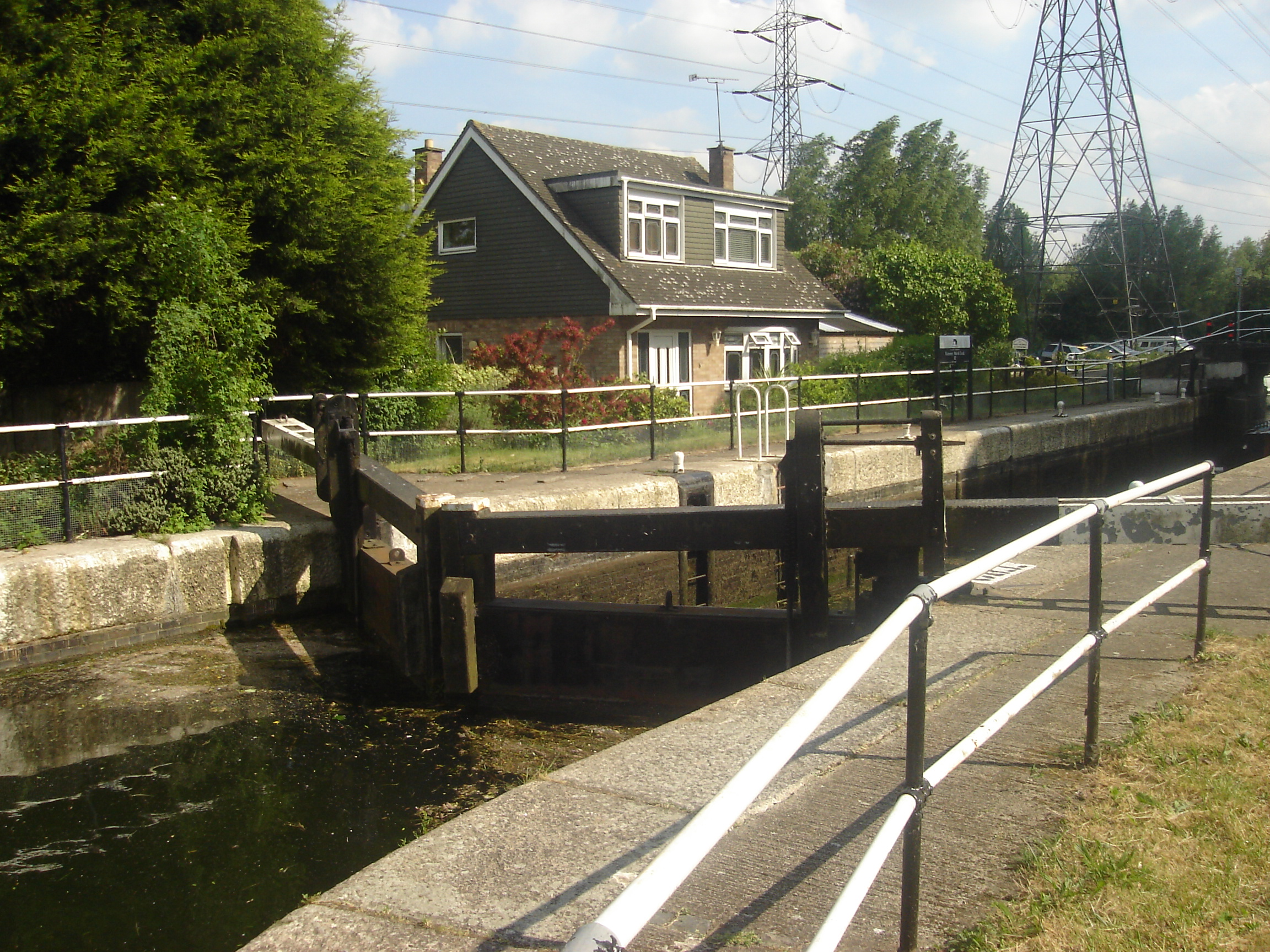
Looking south towards the lock-keeper's house

The lock and the adjoining cut are of 1864. Across the lock tail, a reused cast- iron footbridge dated 1835.

== Public access ==
Vehicular access only from the north via Lea Valley Walk. Which can be accessed at Lea Road.

Pedestrian and cycle access via the towpath which forms part of the Lea Valley Walk.

Angling is allowed on the River Lee Navigation towpath downstream of Ramney Marsh Lock. Information from the River Lea Anglers Club.

== Public transport ==
Nearest station Enfield Lock or Waltham Cross

Next lock upstream	River Lee Navigation	Next lock downstream
Waltham Town Lock; 0.2 mile	Rammey Marsh Lock; Grid reference: TQ3742999635	Enfield Lock; 0.8 mile
