= Rammey Marsh =

Marshland in London

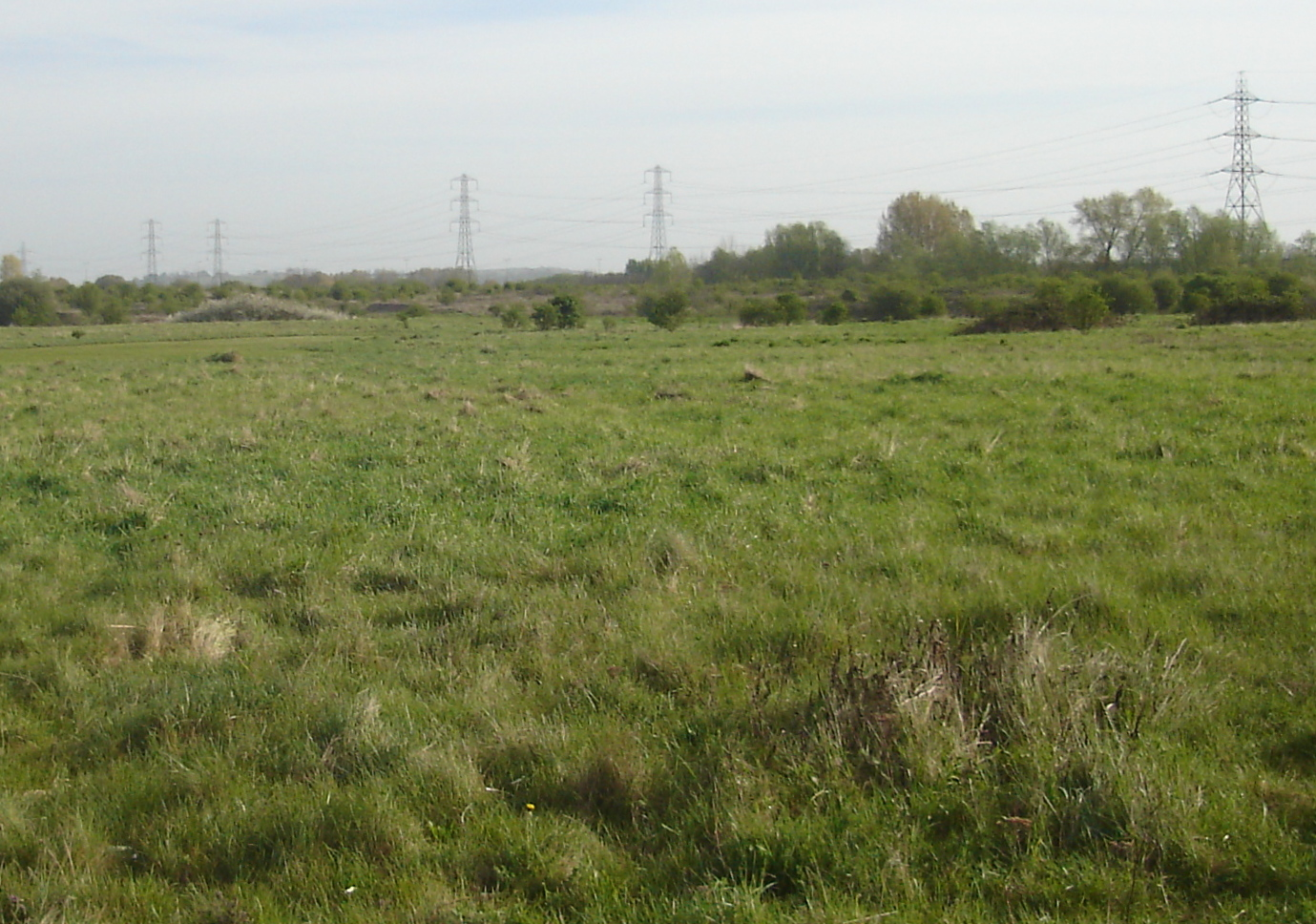
Rammey Marsh looking north

Rammey Marsh is located in the Lee Valley Park at Enfield Lock, Enfield, England, and covers approximately 42 hectares (100 acres). The site is owned and managed by the Lee Valley Regional Park Authority.

== Location ==
The site is bounded by the M25 to the north. Mollison Avenue A1055 forms the majority of the western boundary together with a short section of the Lee Valley railway line, its eastern boundary is formed by the Lee Navigation while Smeaton Road forms the southern boundary. Flowing under the M25 the Small River Lea enters the site for a short distance before flowing under the A1055 road.

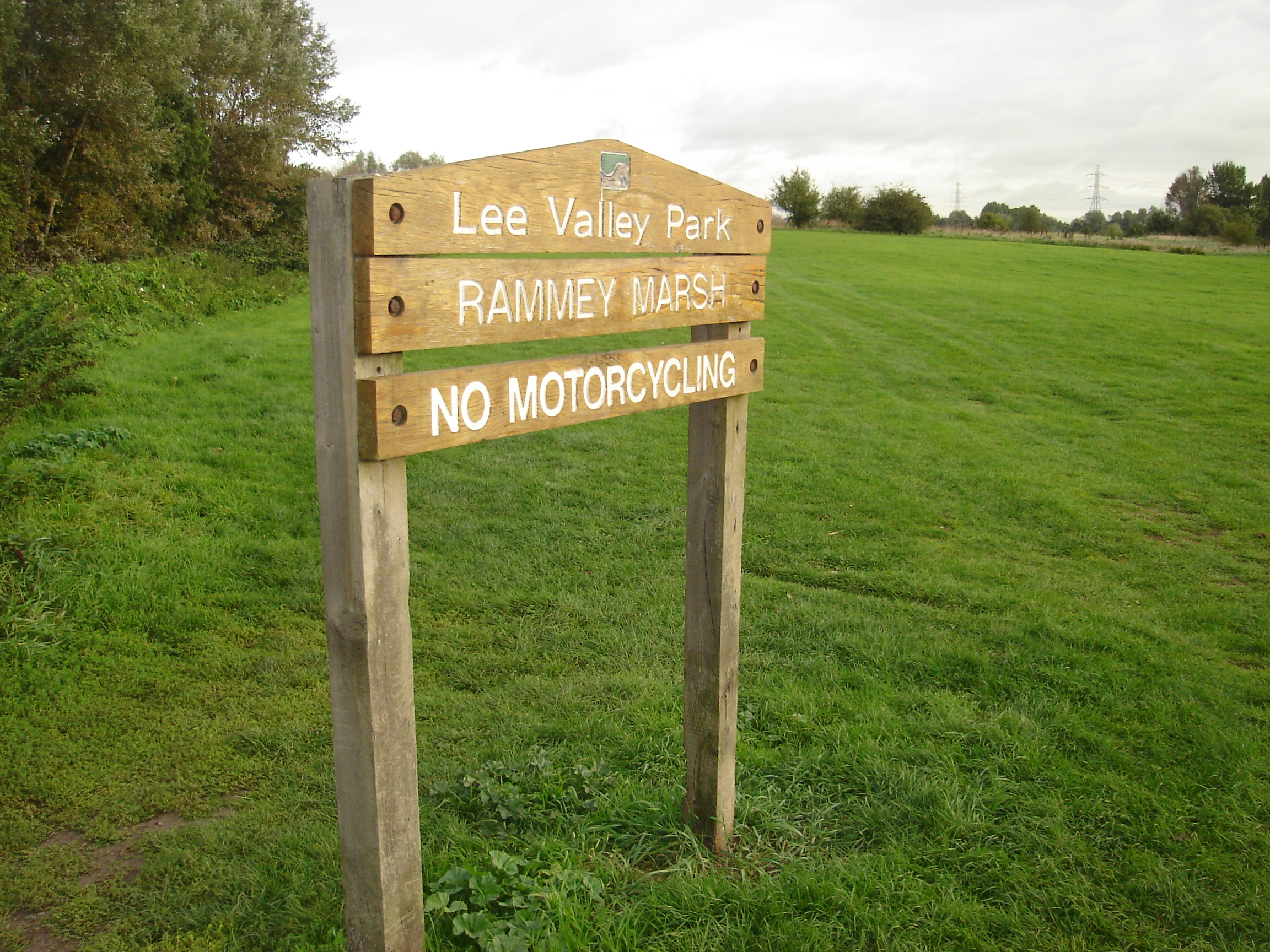
The marsh at its southern edge

== Etymology ==
Rammey Marsh is marked thus on the Ordnance Survey map of 1887, named from Ramhey 1538, Rammey 1610, probably 'island (of dry ground in marsh) where rams are pastured', from Old English ramm and ēg.

== History ==
Rammey Marsh was once part of an extensive floodplain which stretched down to the River Thames. The marsh was used as pasture for summer grazing since Anglo-Saxon times. During the mid 20th century much of the marsh was given over to gravel extraction. The resulting flooded gravel pits were used for landfill which raised the profile of the site.

On completion of the A1055 road in the late 20th century, the marsh was bisected from north to south. To the west of the road which approximately follows the course of the Small River Lea was the site of the former Rammey Marsh Sewage Treatment Works. Today, the site is the home to the Innova Business and Science Park, Oasis Academy School, hotel, housing and Rammey Marsh lake a former gravel pit 51.6729°N 0.0202°W which has matured into a conservation area and fishery.

== Description ==
A dry ditch which was a channel of the Small River Lea splits the site into two distinct areas, with the south being mixed grassland which is mostly flat and bisected by several maintained grass paths and the north resembling an undulating chalk grassland.

== Wildlife ==
Some 225 plant species are present on the site, including pyramidal orchid and a colony of over 5000 bee orchid believed to be the largest group of this type in South East England. Birds such as reed bunting, skylark, meadow pipit, linnet have been recorded and the marsh is also an important site for spring visitors. Grassland provides a good habitat for the grass snake. Mammals seen on the marsh include pipistrelle bats. The Small River Lea provides an important habitat for the water vole

== Projects ==
Attempts to construct two ponds were unsuccessful due to ground contamination. Additional projects include the building of amphibian and reptile refuges using soil and rubble and plans to re-work the banks of the central ditch to improve the habitat for water voles and other animals during the winter of 2010/11.

== Public transport ==
=== Rail ===
Enfield Lock

=== Bus ===
121

491

== Public access ==
Car parking is available at Smeaton Road. Pedestrian and cycle access is found at various points around the site. The towpath of the Lee Navigation forms part of the Lee Valley Walk lies on the marsh's eastern fringe.

== See also ==
- Rammey Marsh Lock
