= Enfield Island Village =

Housing development in London, England

Coordinates: 51.670°N 0.015°W

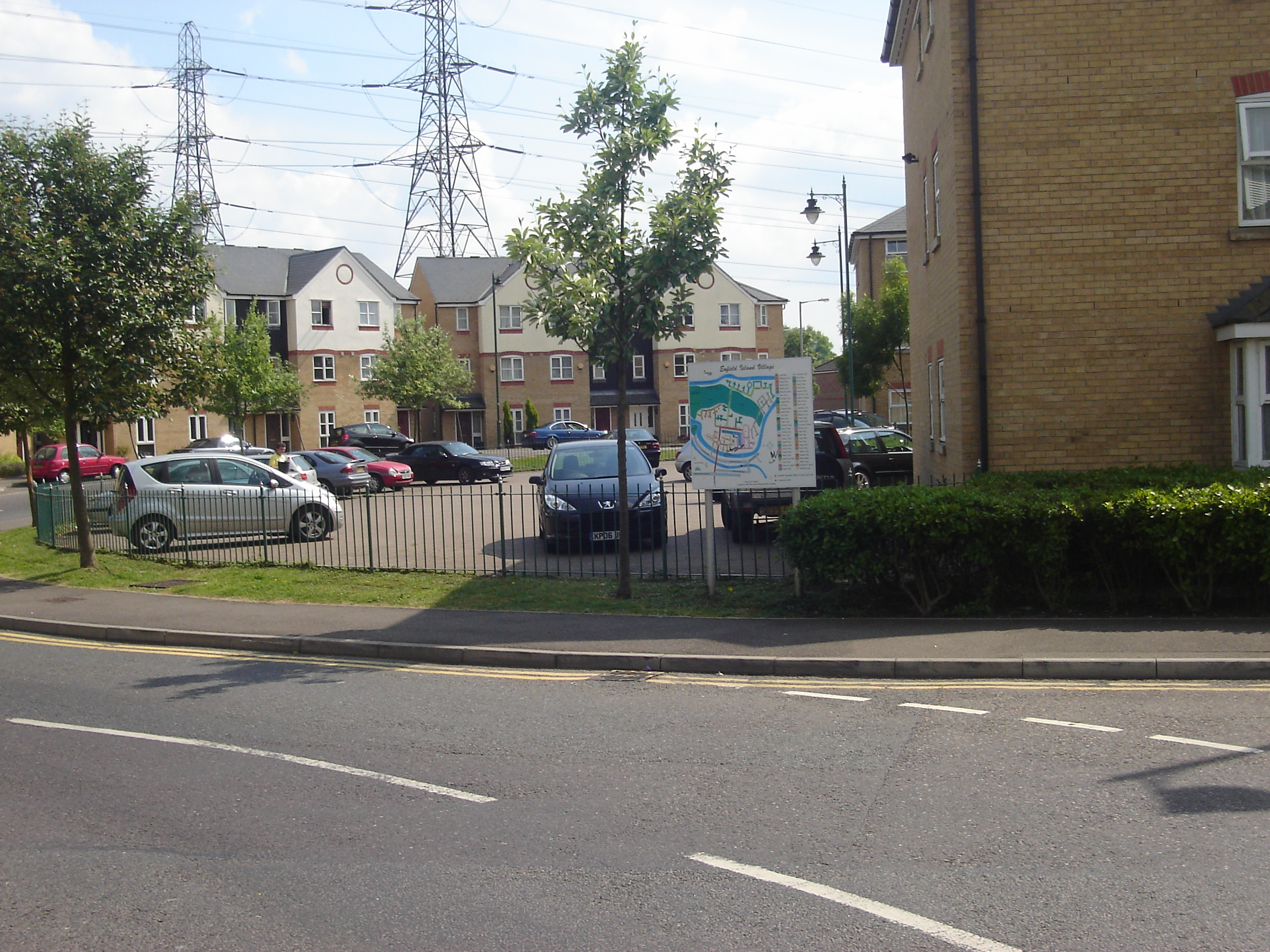
- Housing on the island

- Location within Greater London
- London borough: Enfield
- Ceremonial county: Greater London
- Region: London
- Country: England
- Sovereign state: United Kingdom
- Post town: ENFIELD
- Postcode district: EN3
- Dialling code: 01992
- Police: Metropolitan
- Fire: London
- Ambulance: London
- UK Parliament: Enfield North
- London Assembly: Enfield and Haringey

Enfield Island Village is a modern housing development in the Enfield Lock area of Enfield, north London. It was built between 1997 and 2003 on land previously occupied by the Royal Small Arms Factory.

The land formed part of Waltham Abbey until 1 April 1994, when it was transferred from the Epping Forest District of Essex to the London Borough of Enfield in Greater London.

== History ==
Enfield Island Village was built on land previously occupied by the Royal Small Arms Factory. It is close to the borders of Essex and Hertfordshire, and is adjacent to the River Lee Navigation, River Lea, Cattlegate Flood Relief Channel, and Newmans Weir, as well as open countryside, including Epping Forest.

The site was decommissioned by the MOD in 1984 and was sold to British Aerospace (BAe). BAe together with Trafalgar House launched a joint venture company, Lee Valley Developments (LVD). In 1996, the land was sold to Fairview Homes, the housing wing of Hillsdown Holdings.

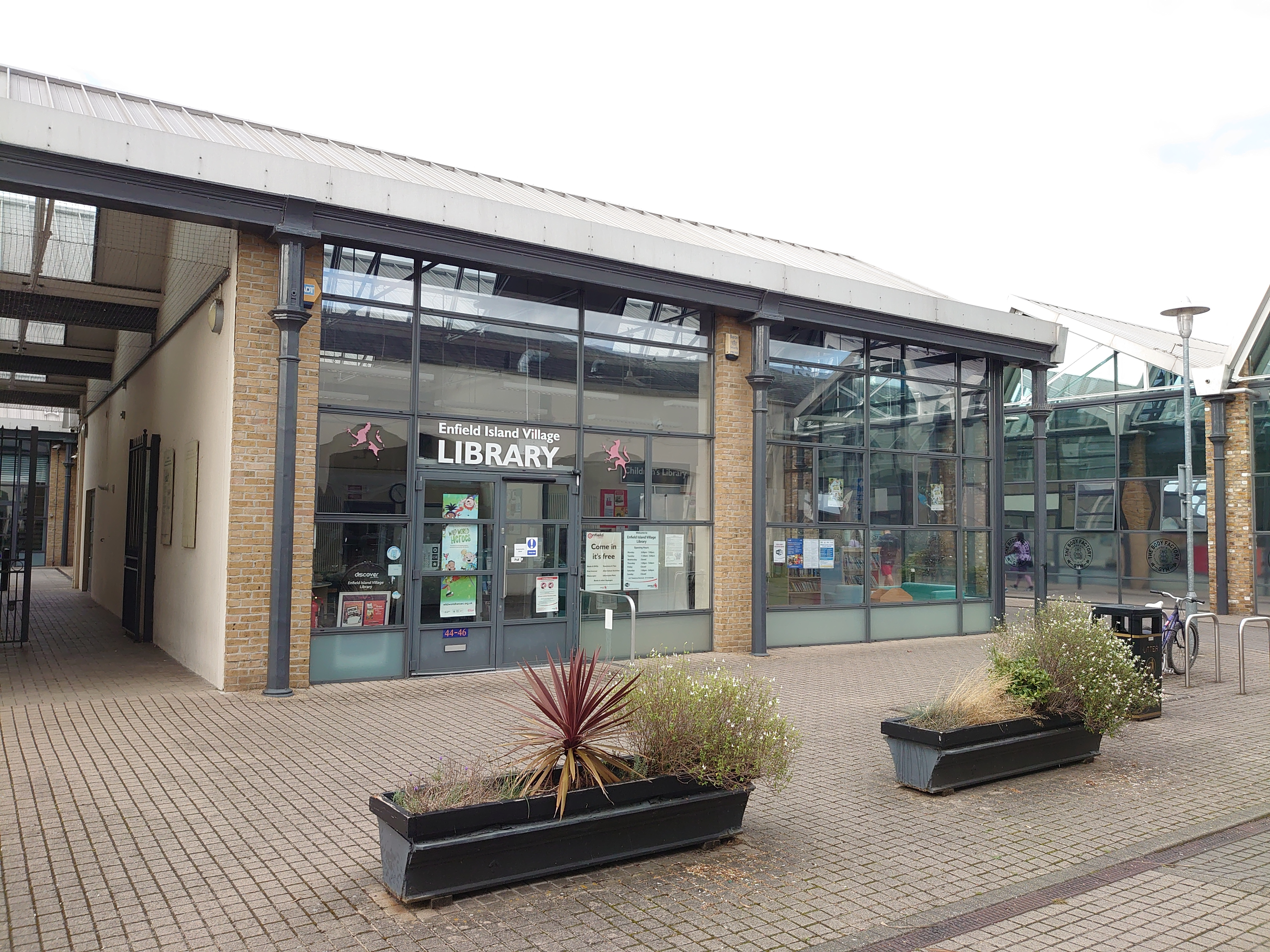
The library was opened in 2008.

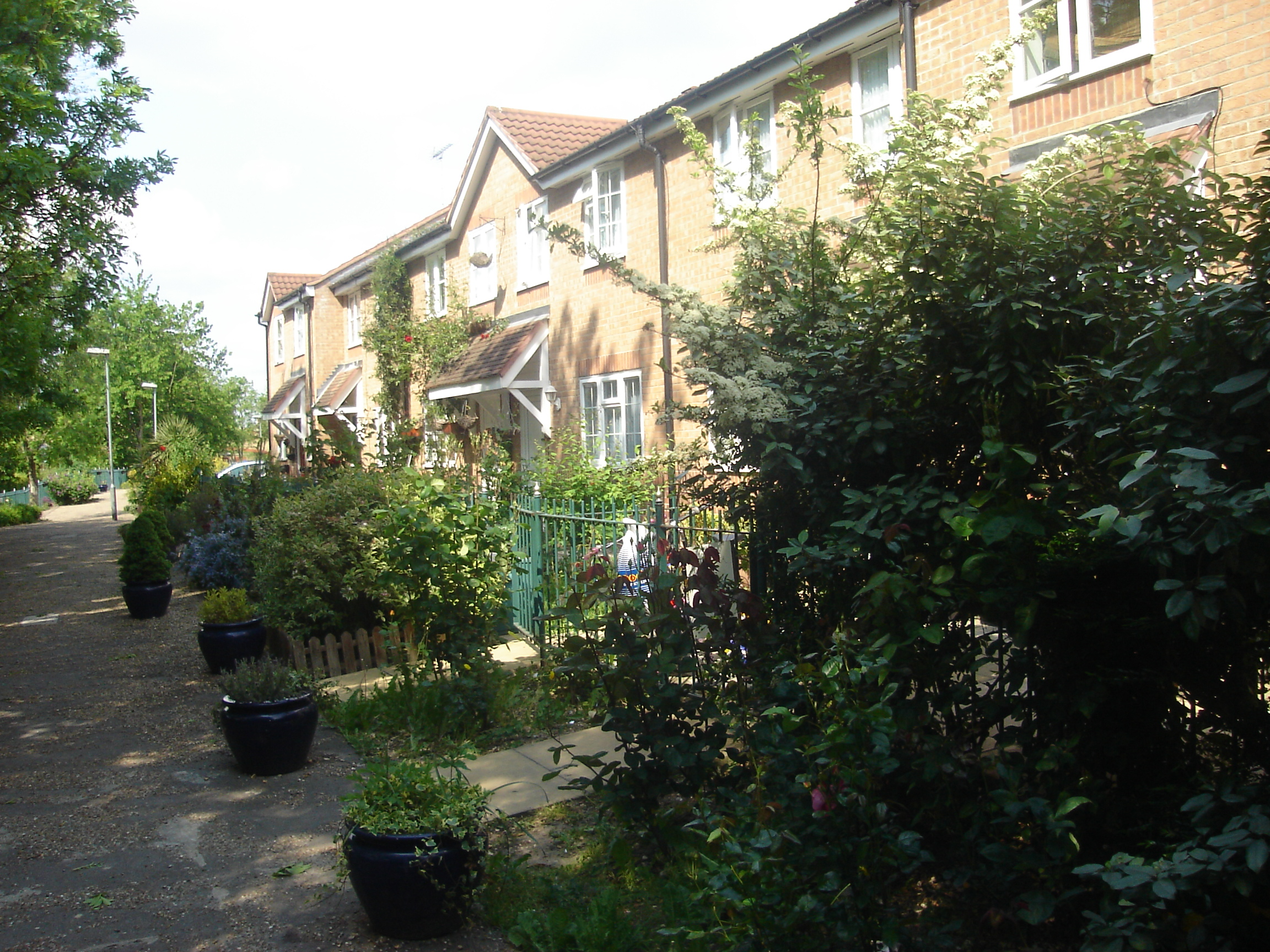
Riverside gardens

The housing estate was built by Fairview New Homes between 1997 and 2003 on a 100-acre (0.40 km^{2}) brownfield site. It comprises a mixture of housing ranging from one-bedroom flats to five-bedroom houses. In line with national standards, 25% of the housing was designated as social housing, and some of the original buildings have been retained. The development has a central parkland area and a small shopping centre. The shops include a small supermarket, a pharmacy, and a Chinese takeaway. The Island also has its own general practitioner (GP), private fitness centre, and a new (2003) primary school – Keys Meadow in nearby Enfield Lock. A new library opened in 2008.

The development is on a flood plain. However, the Environment Agency's assessment is that even without the flood defences that surround the Island, there is even less risk of serious flooding (0.1%, or 1 in 1000 years) than in the surrounding area (0.5%, or 1 in 200 years).

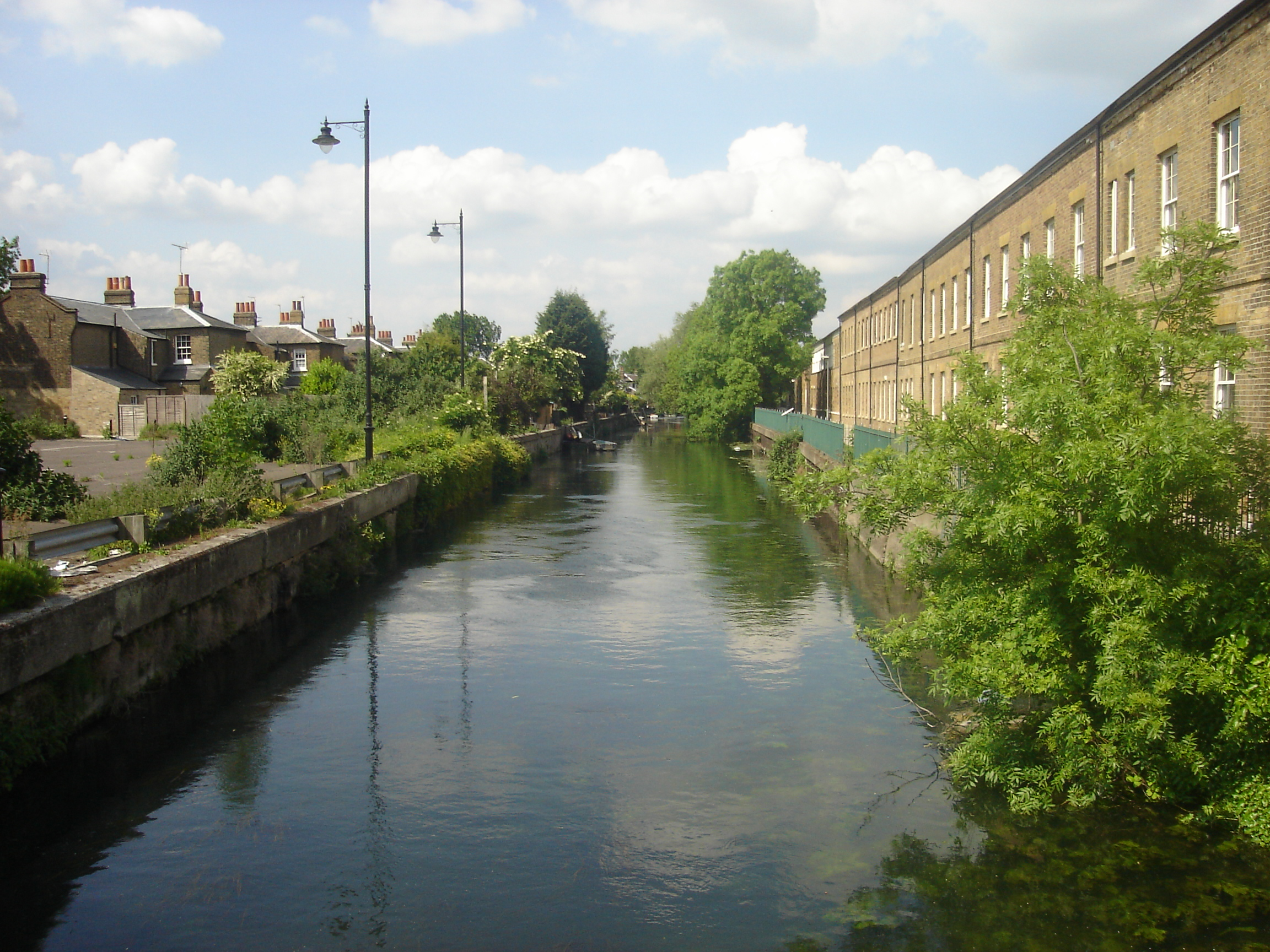
The River Lea flows through the island

As it is a private development, residents are responsible for many aspects of life on the Island through the Enfield Island Village Trust. The Trust is responsible for the upkeep of common land, including the ornamental canal and parkland, utilities such as the waste water system, and for enforcing legal covenants covering the development.

There was a campaign against the development by Friends of the Earth and the Enfield Lock Action Group in the late 1990s. The campaign resulted in the Enfield RSAF (Royal Small Arms Factory) Review Panel being set up, informed by environmental reports carried out over ten years and including evidence from witnesses such as the Head of Land Quality at the Environment Agency and a team of environmental consultants. The review concluded that the site was safe for development and that campaigners' claims regarding rumours of dangerous materials were untrue.

Planning permission was granted for the development, supported by the European Union and by the Enfield Enterprise Agency. It was developed as a model brown field development, with a clay cap at a depth of one metre under the topsoil. Safety inspections were initially carried out every six months, but this has now been reduced to annually.

== In popular culture ==
The area was featured in a 2000 edition of the BBC TV programme Panorama focusing on brownfield land housing development.

== Nearest places ==
- Enfield Lock
- Brimsdown
- Waltham Cross
- Sewardstone
- Waltham Abbey

== Nearest stations ==
- Enfield Lock railway station
- Brimsdown railway station

== Gallery ==
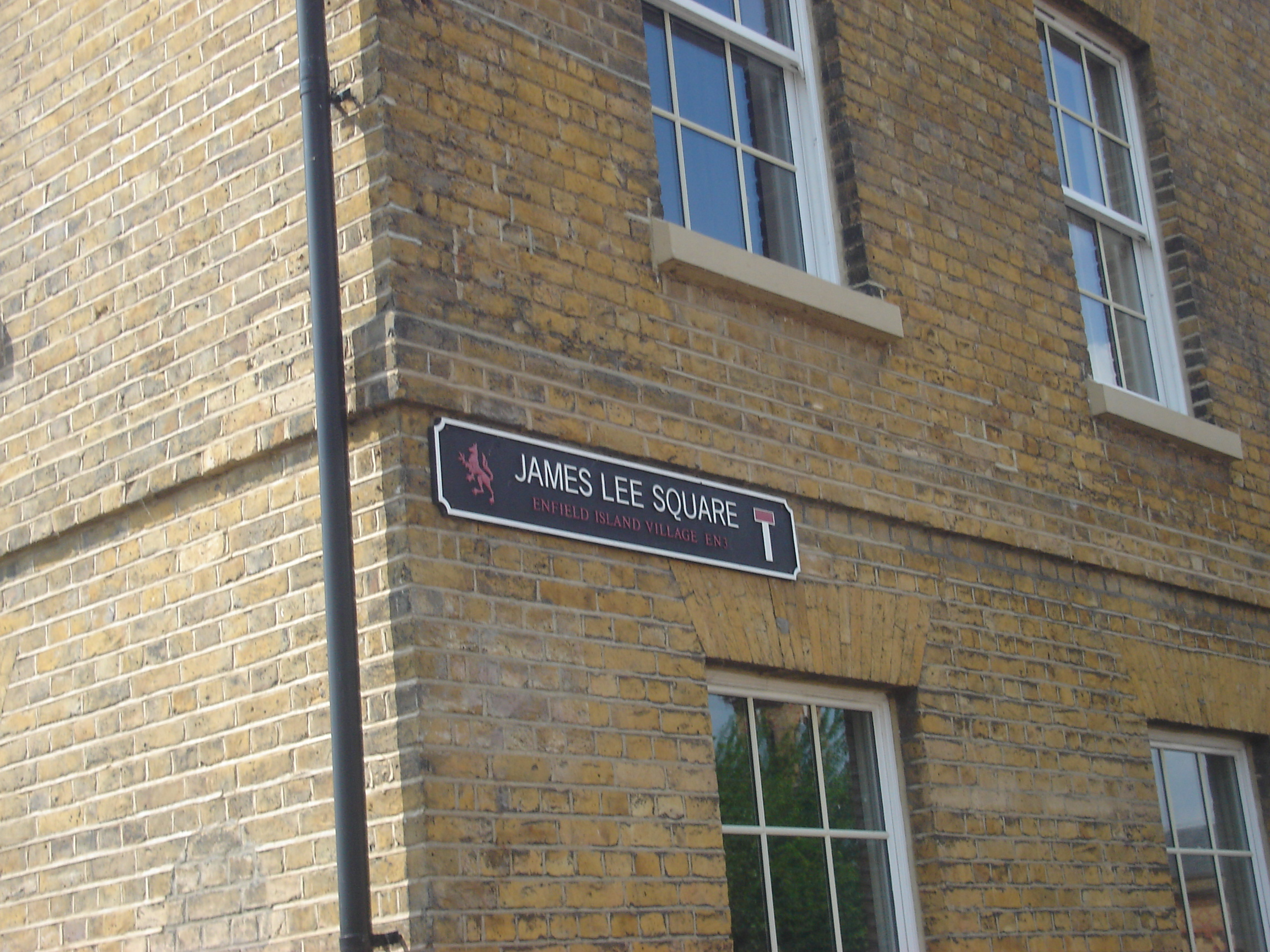
James Lee square

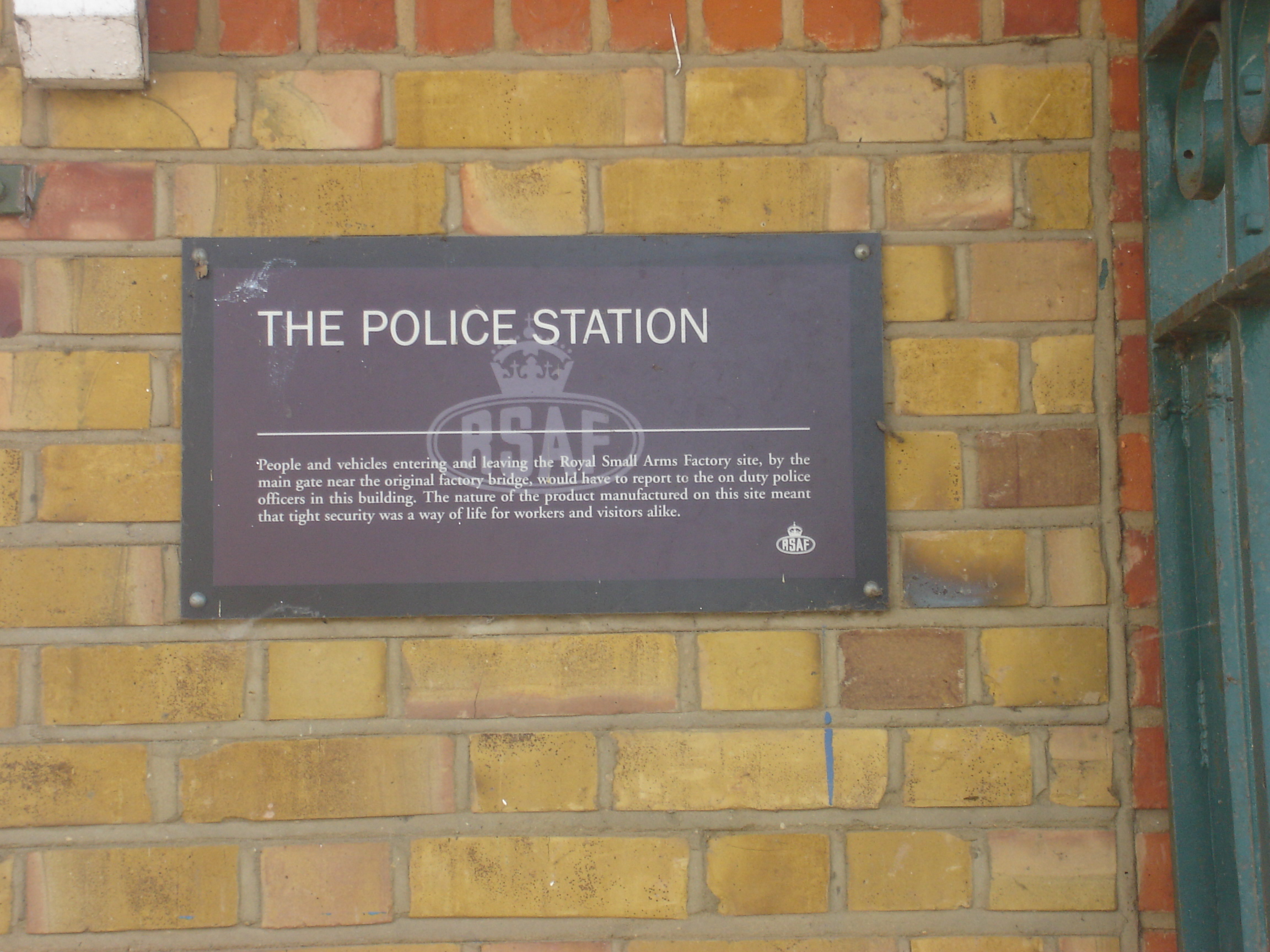
Former police station

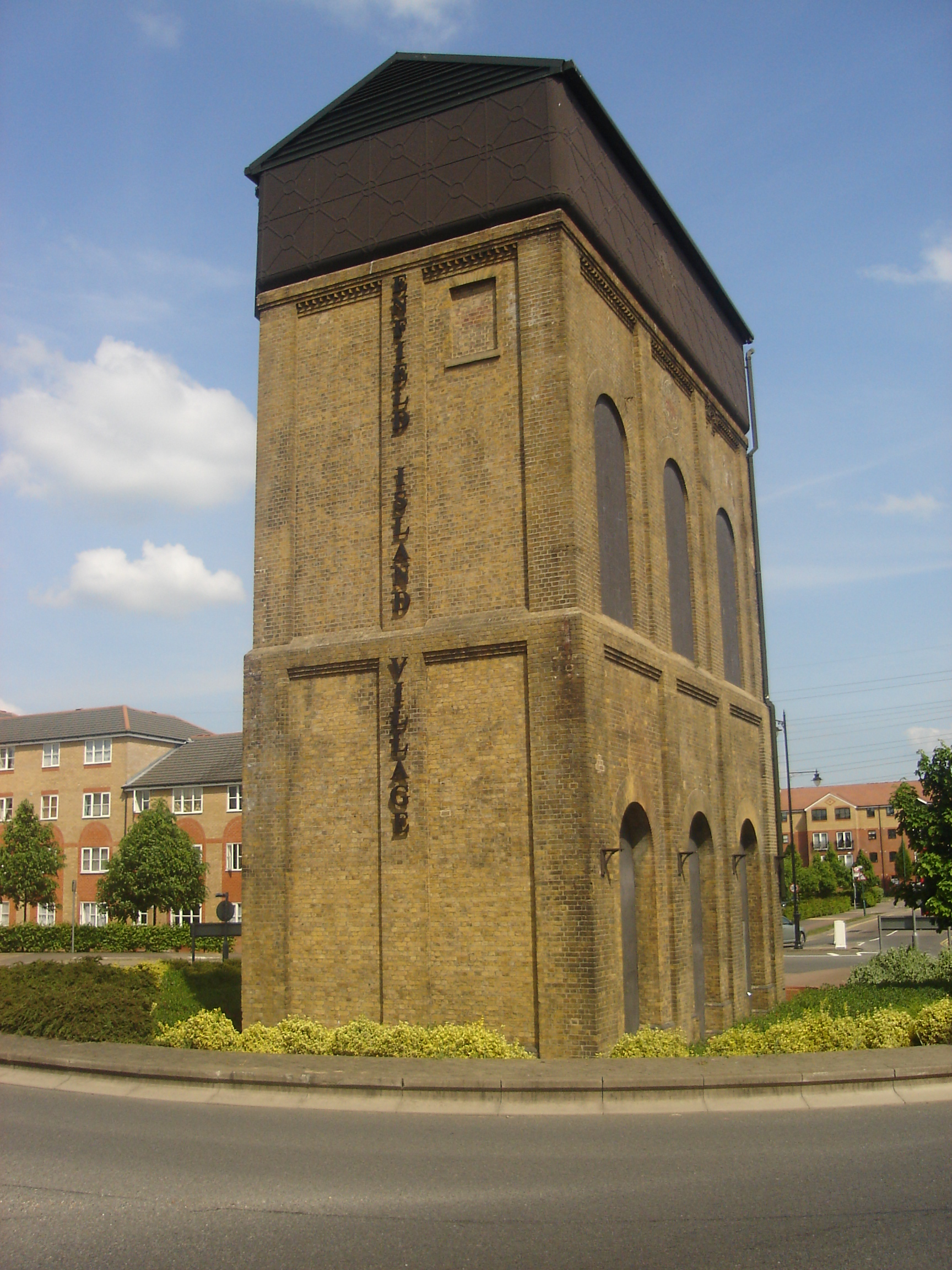
Water tower on the island

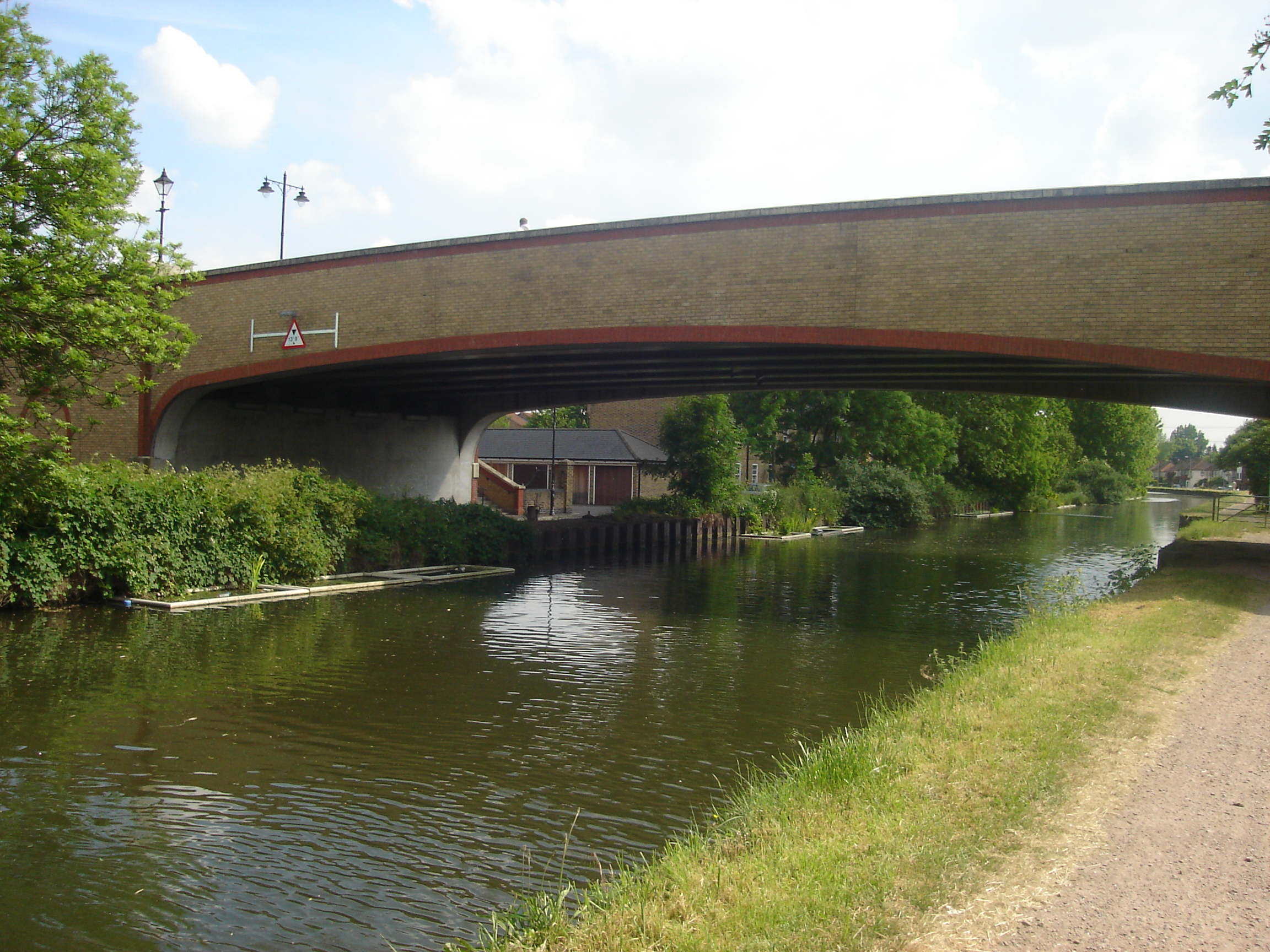
Road bridge leading to the island spanning the River Lee Navigation (completed 1998)

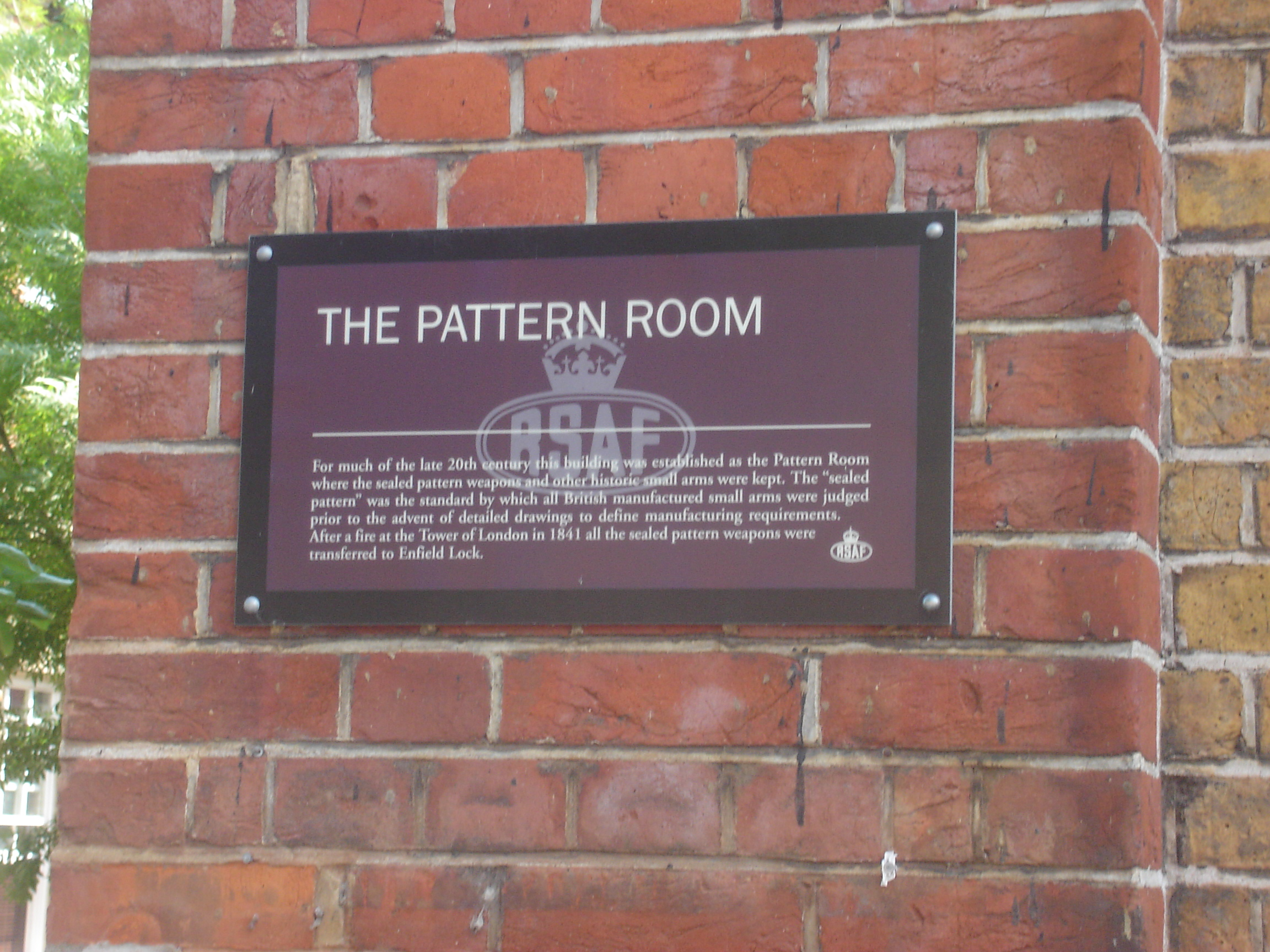
The Pattern Room

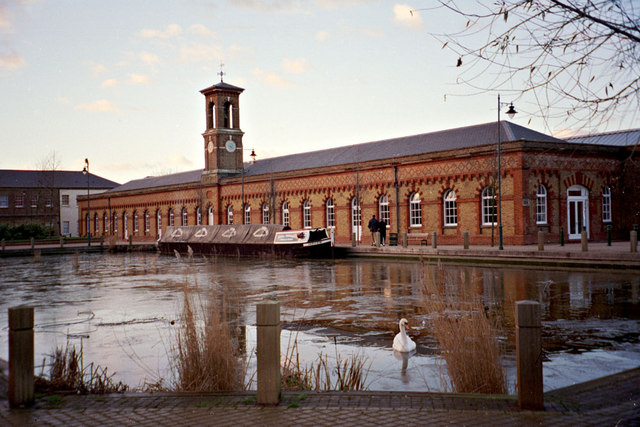
The machine shop

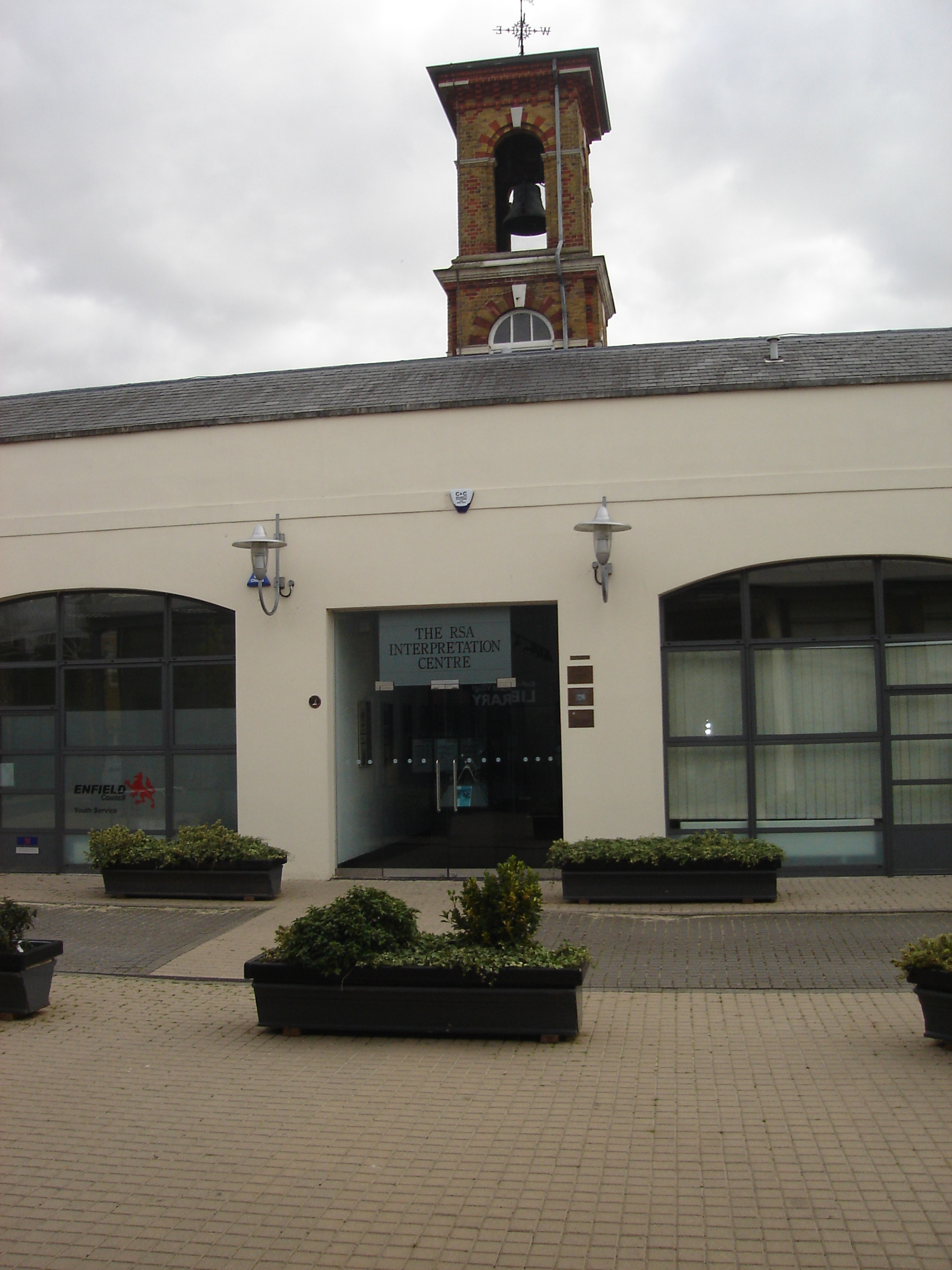
RSAF interpretation centre

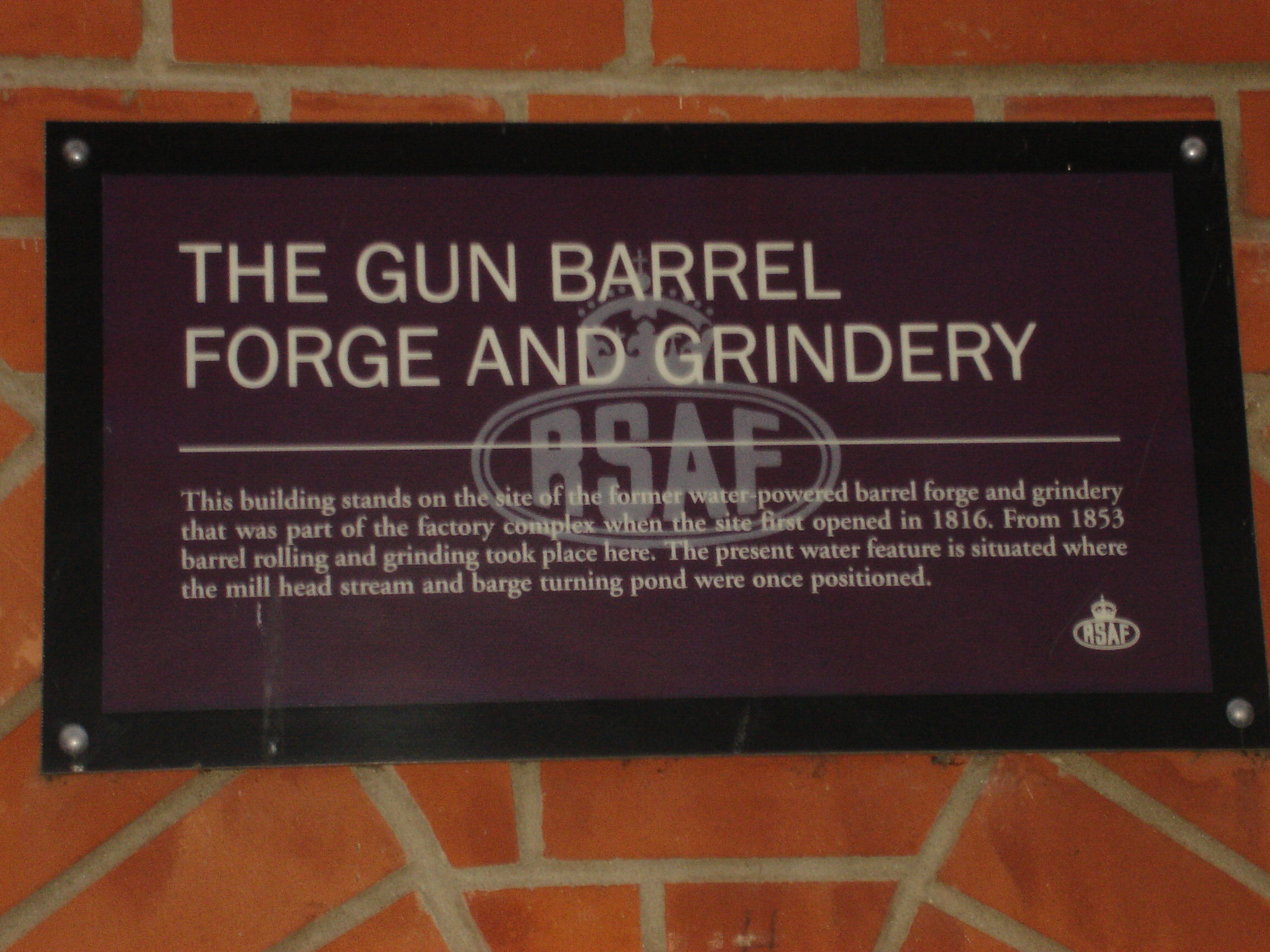
The former gun barrel forge and grindery

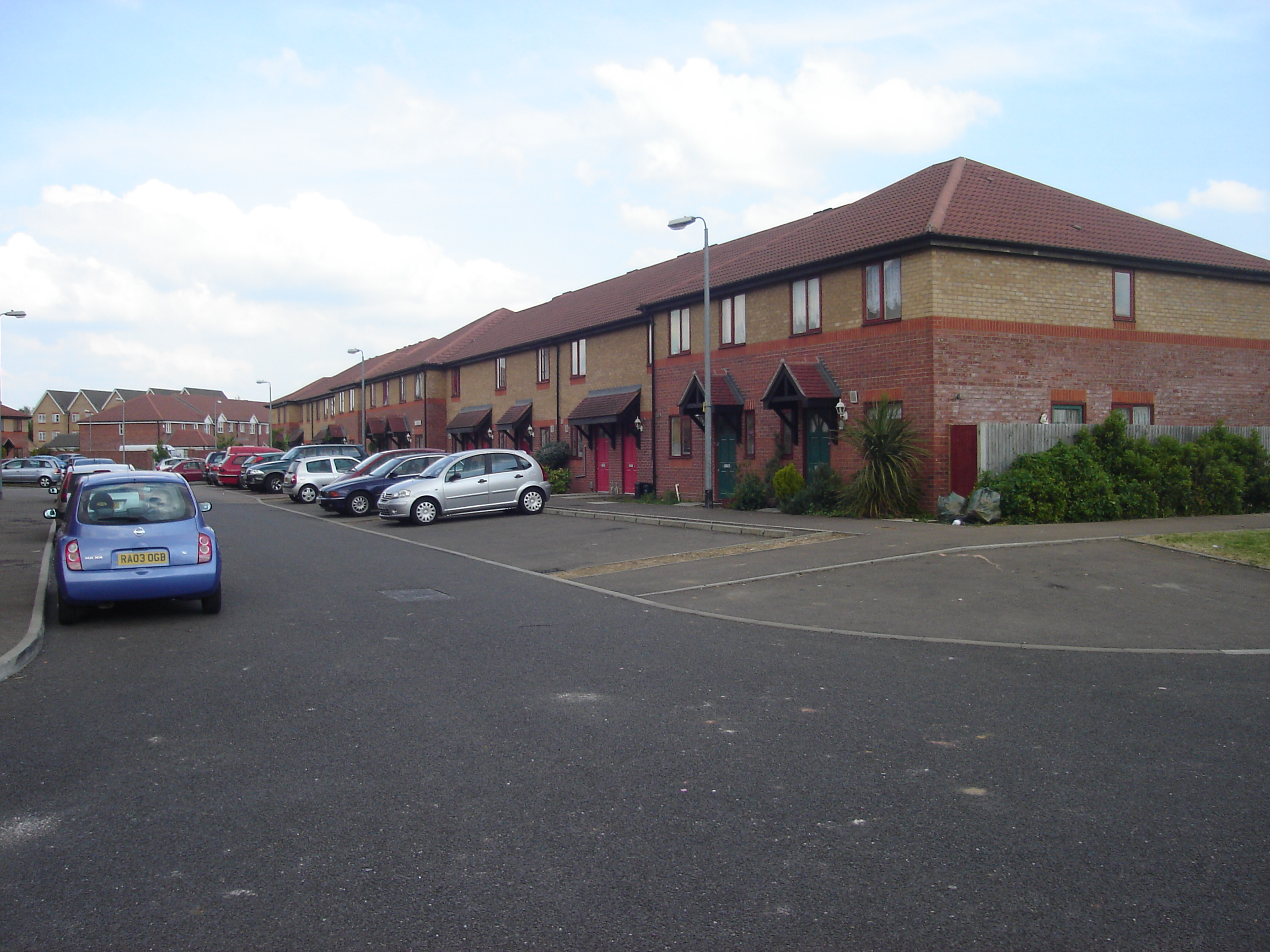
Housing on the Island

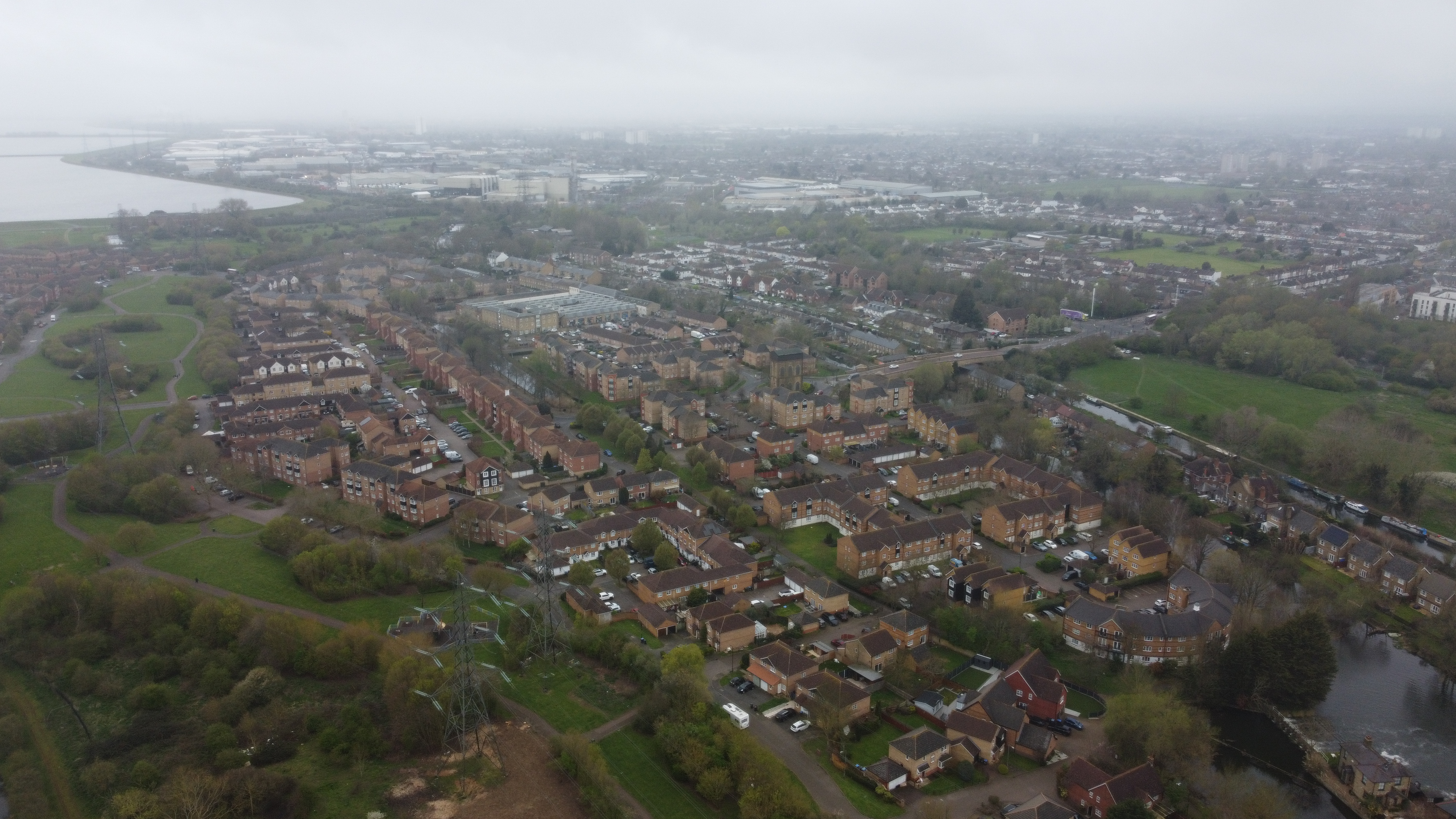
Aerial View of the Island
