= Waltham Town Lock =

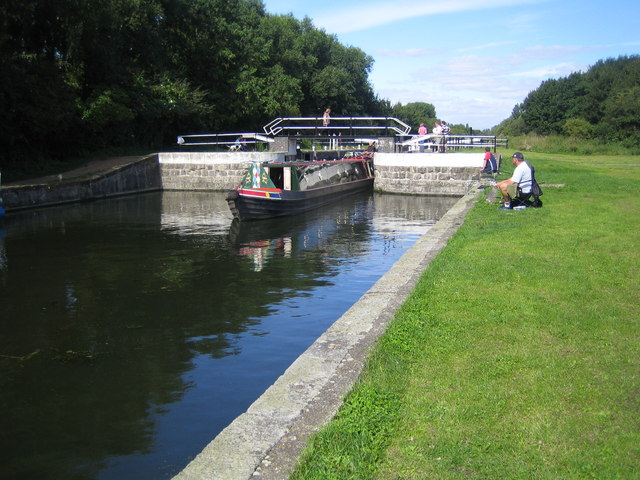
- Waltham Town Lock; Narrowboat Alder emerges from the downstream gate
- Interactive map of Waltham Town Lock
- 51°41′15″N 0°00′45″W
- Waterway: River Lee Navigation
- County: Hertfordshire; Essex
- Maintained by: Canal & River Trust
- Operation: Manual
- Length: 85 feet (25.9 m)
- Width: 16 feet (4.9 m)
- Fall: 4 feet 3 inches (1.3 m)
- Distance to Bow Creek: 12.5 miles (20.1 km)
- Distance to Hertford Castle Weir: 13.8 miles (22.2 km)

Waltham Town Lock (No 11) is a lock on the River Lee Navigation at Waltham Cross, Hertfordshire. The lock is located in the River Lee Country Park which is part of the Lee Valley Park. The adjoining Showground site now known as the Broxbourne White Water Canoe Centre has been chosen to host the canoeing event in the 2012 Summer Olympics.

Flowing close to the lock is the River Lee Flood Relief Channel known as the Horsemill Stream at this point.

== Public access ==
Vehicular access from A121 Station road to car parking close to lock.

Pedestrian and cycle access via the towpath which forms part of the Lea Valley Walk

== Public transport ==
Waltham Cross railway station

Bus services; 211, 212, 213, 240, 250, 251, 506.

Next lock upstream	River Lee Navigation	Next lock downstream
Waltham Common Lock; 1.0 mile	Waltham Town Lock; Grid reference: TL 37478 00610	Rammey Marsh Lock; 0.2 mile
