= Newmans Weir =

Weir on the River Lea in London, England

Coordinates: 51.6727°N 0.0144°W

Newmans Weir is a weir on the River Lea located near Enfield Lock. The weir has wooden sluice gates within cast-iron guide frames. It was reconstructed in 1907, replacing a series of previous timber weirs.

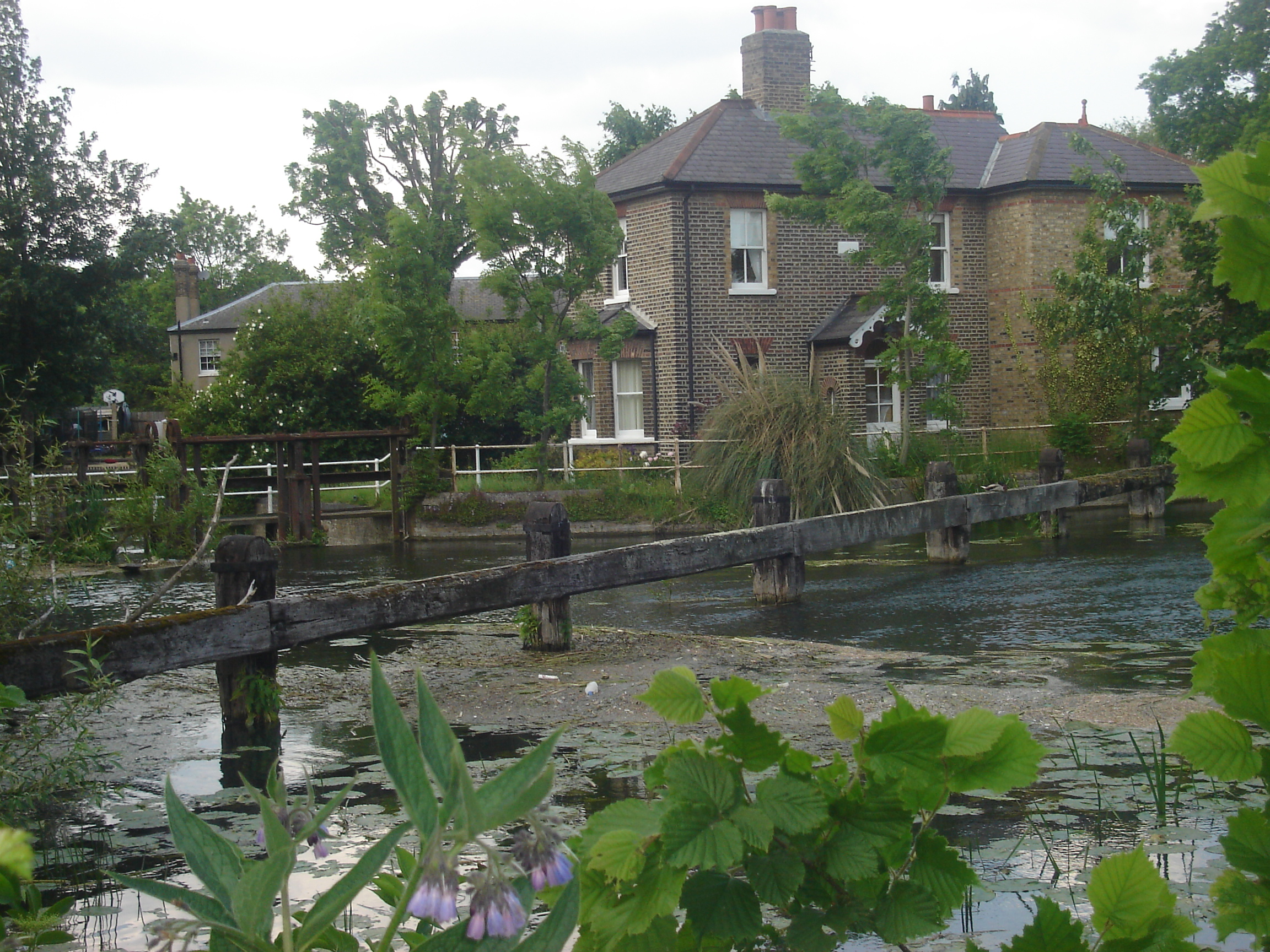
The view above the weir; the weir-keeper's cottage stands on the far bank

== Access ==
There is no public access. The weir can be seen at a distance from a public footpath at Enfield Island Village.

== Public transport ==
The nearest railway station is Enfield Lock.
