= Waltham Common Lock =

Lock in Hertfordshire, England

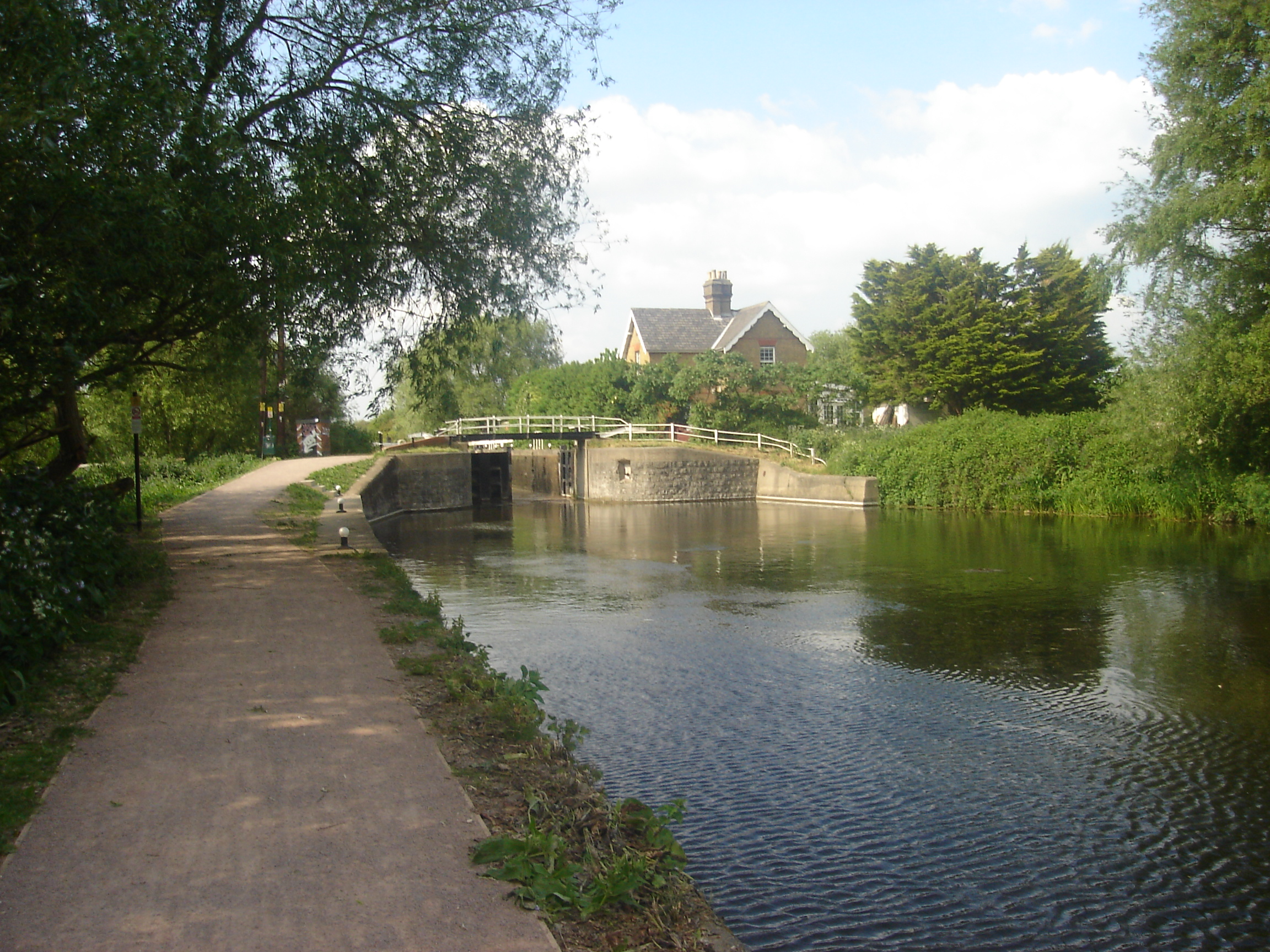
- Downstream of the lock
- Interactive map of Waltham Common Lock
- 51°41′55″N 0°01′07″W
- Waterway: River Lee Navigation
- County: Hertfordshire; Essex
- Maintained by: Canal & River Trust
- Operation: Manual
- Length: 85 feet (25.9 m)
- Width: 16 feet (4.9 m)
- Fall: 4 feet 10 inches (1.5 m)
- Distance to Bow Creek: 13.5 miles (21.7 km)
- Distance to Hertford Castle Weir: 12.8 miles (20.6 km)

Waltham Common Lock (No 10) is a lock on the River Lee Navigation at Waltham Cross in Hertfordshire, England. The lock is located in the River Lee Country Park and stands close to the Broxbourne White Water Canoe Centre. At the tail of the lock is the Powdermill Cut dug in 1806 to connect the Waltham Abbey Royal Gunpowder Mills directly to the then-new navigation.

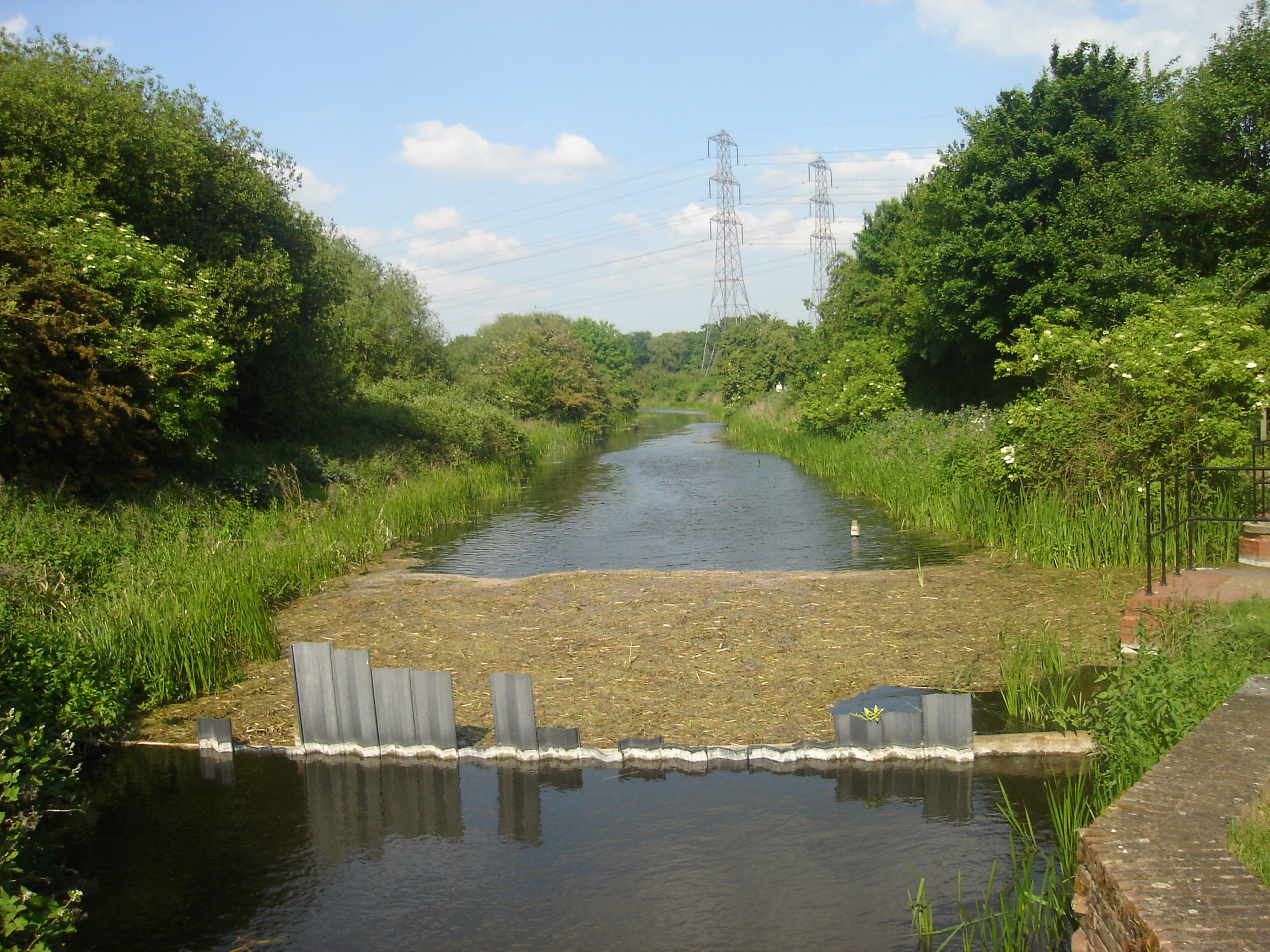
The Powdermill Cut

== Public access ==
Car parking is available at Windmill Lane, Cheshunt. Pedestrian and cycle access is via the towpath that forms part of the Lea Valley Walk. The area is served by Cheshunt railway station.

Next lock upstream	River Lee Navigation	Next lock downstream
Cheshunt Lock; 1.0 mile	Waltham Common Lock; Grid reference: TL3691901892	Waltham Town Lock; 1.0 mile
