= Brimsdown railway station =

National Rail station in London, England

Brimsdown
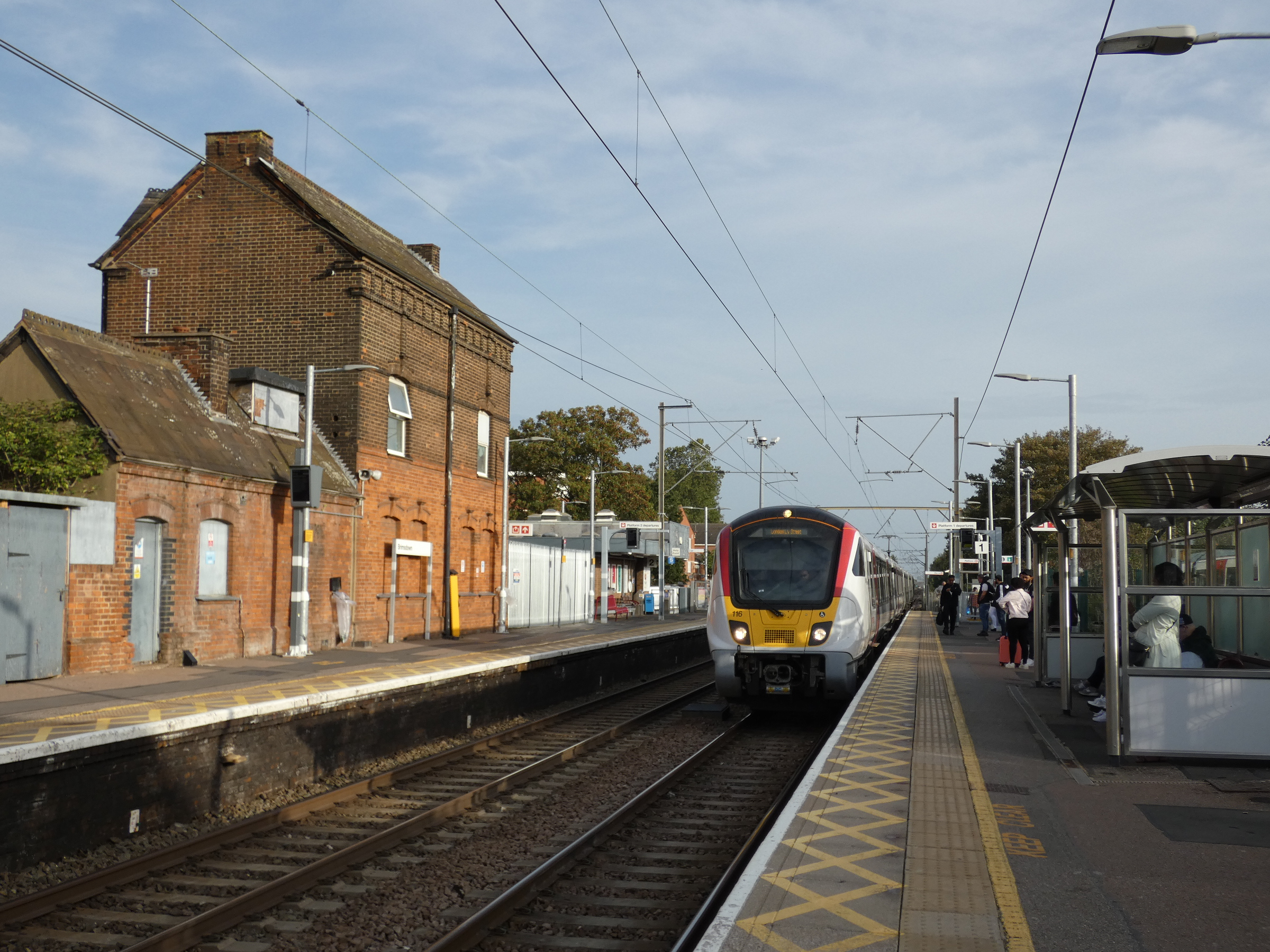
- Platforms at Brimsdown Station in October 2023, looking north
- Interactive map of Brimsdown

General information
- Location: Brimsdown
- Local authority: London Borough of Enfield
- Managed by: Greater Anglia
- Owner: Network Rail
- Station code: BMD
- DfT category: E
- Number of platforms: 2
- Accessible: Yes
- Fare zone: 5

National Rail annual entry and exit
- 2020–21: ▼0.501 million
- 2021–22: ▲0.822 million
- 2022–23: ▲0.938 million
- 2023–24: ▲1.051 million
- 2024–25: ▲1.135 million

Key dates
- 1 October 1884: Opened

Other information
- External links: Departures; Facilities
- Coordinates: 51.6556°N 0.0308°W

Brimsdown railway station is on the West Anglia Main Line, serving the neighbourhood of Brimsdown in the London Borough of Enfield, north London. It is 10 miles 61 chains (17.3 km) down the line from Liverpool Street and is situated between Ponders End and Enfield Lock. Its three-letter station code is BMD and it is in London fare zone 5.

The station and all trains serving it are operated by Greater Anglia.

Brimsdown station was used in 1951 as a location for part of the Alexander Mackendrick film The Man in the White Suit, starring Alec Guinness, as the station where Sidney Stratton tries to buy a ticket near the end of the film.

== History ==
The railway line from Stratford to Broxbourne was opened by the Northern and Eastern Railway on 15 September 1840. The station itself (which at one time was to be named Green Street) was financed by a local landowner and developer, and built by builder W Bangs & Co. The station opened on 1 October 1884, and services were operated by the Great Eastern Railway (GER).

A signal box built by McKenzie and Holland was provided with 15 levers to operate points and signals, and this was enlarged in 1899 to have 32 levers. In 1928 it was recorded as having a 42-lever frame, so further expansion had clearly taken place in the intervening years.

Some goods sidings were located on the up side, and a short branch to the Royal Small Arms Factory at Enfield Lock joined these from the east. There was also a siding to a power station.

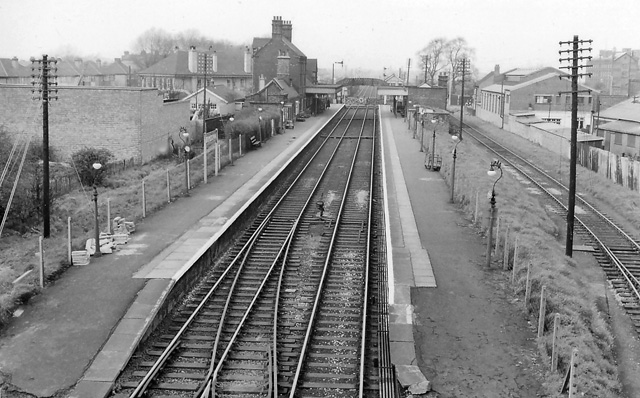
Brimsdown Station in April 1961

At the start of 1923, the GER amalgamated with several other railways to create the London and North Eastern Railway as a result of the grouping of the UK's railways into four major companies.

The station was bombed on 22 July 1944; the signal box was destroyed.

Following nationalisation of the railways in January 1948, Brimsdown became part of Eastern Region of British Railways.

The lines through Brimsdown were electrified on 5 May 1969. Prior to the completion of electrification in 1969, passenger services between Cheshunt and London Liverpool Street through Brimsdown station were normally operated by Class 125 diesel multiple units (which had been purpose-built for the line in 1958).

On sectorisation in the 1980s the station was managed and served by Network SouthEast.

=== Since 1990 ===
==== Track and signals ====
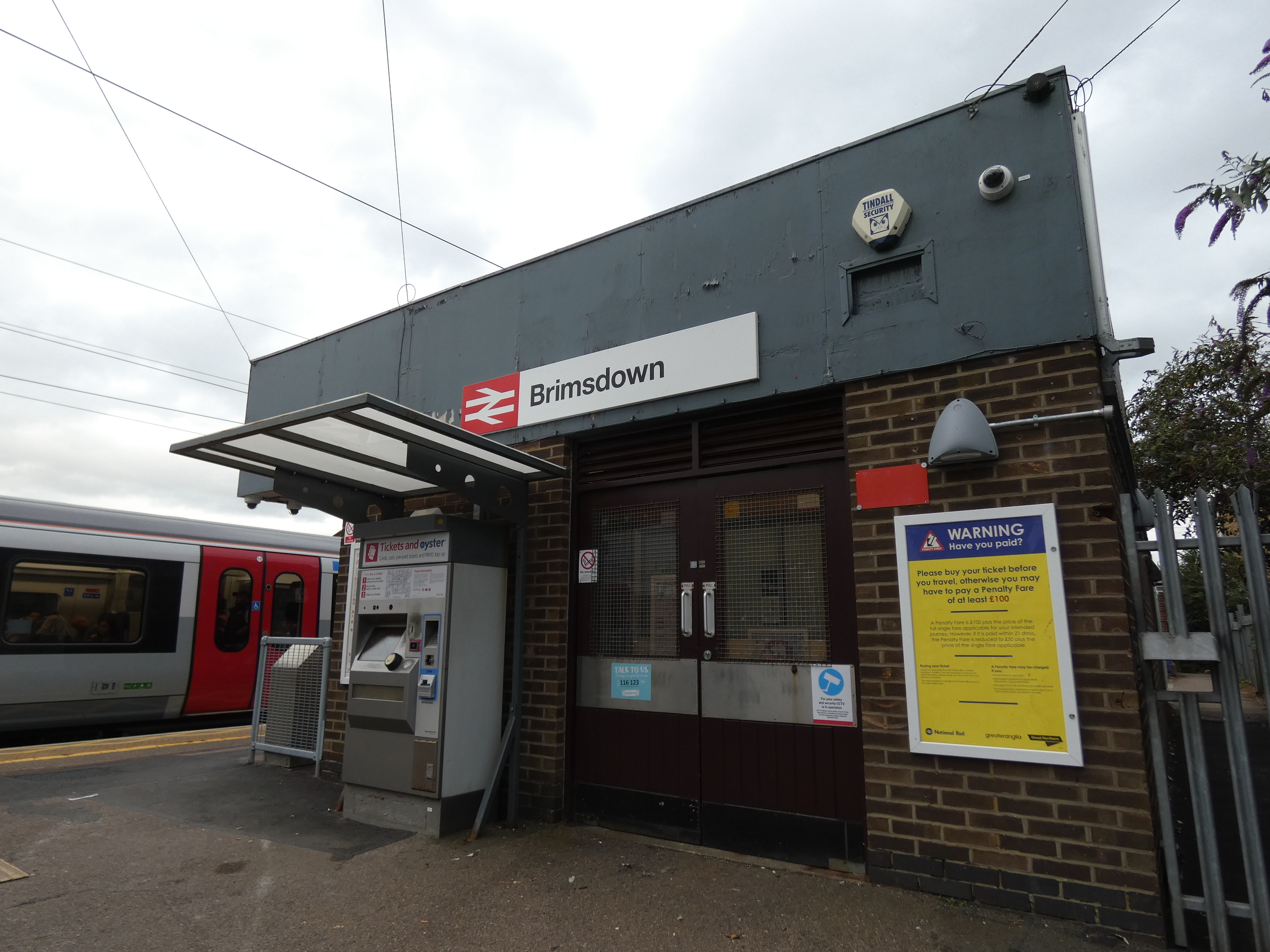
The ticket office at Brimsdown Station in August 2023

As with most of the UK, management of the nationally owned track and signals passed in 1994 to Railtrack, which was succeeded by Network Rail in 2004.

In August 2002, signalling control for the relevant section of track was transferred to the Liverpool Street Integrated Electronic Control Centre (IECC).

==== Operation of passenger services ====
Following privatisation in 1994, operation of the station was allocated to a business unit before being taken over by West Anglia Great Northern (WAGN) in January 1997, at the time owned by Prism Rail. National Express acquired the franchise-holder in July 2000.

The WAGN franchise was replaced in 2003 by the One franchise later renamed National Express East Anglia.

Oyster card readers came into use on 2 January 2010.

In February 2012 operation of the station changed once again, with Abellio Greater Anglia taking over the franchise.

== Services ==
All services at Brimsdown are operated by Greater Anglia using Class 720 EMUs.

The typical off-peak service is two trains per hour in each direction between Hertford East and London Liverpool Street via Tottenham Hale. During the peak hours, the station is served by an additional two trains per hour between Liverpool Street and Cambridge, along with a few trains to Stratford and Bishops Stortford. There is also one train per weekday to Ely.

On Sundays, the southbound services to London Liverpool Street run to Stratford instead.

Preceding station	National Rail	Following station
Ponders End	Greater Anglia Lea Valley Lines	Enfield Lock

== Connections ==
London Buses routes 191, 307 and 491 serve the station.
