= Waltham Cross railway station =

National Rail station in Hertfordshire, England

Waltham Cross
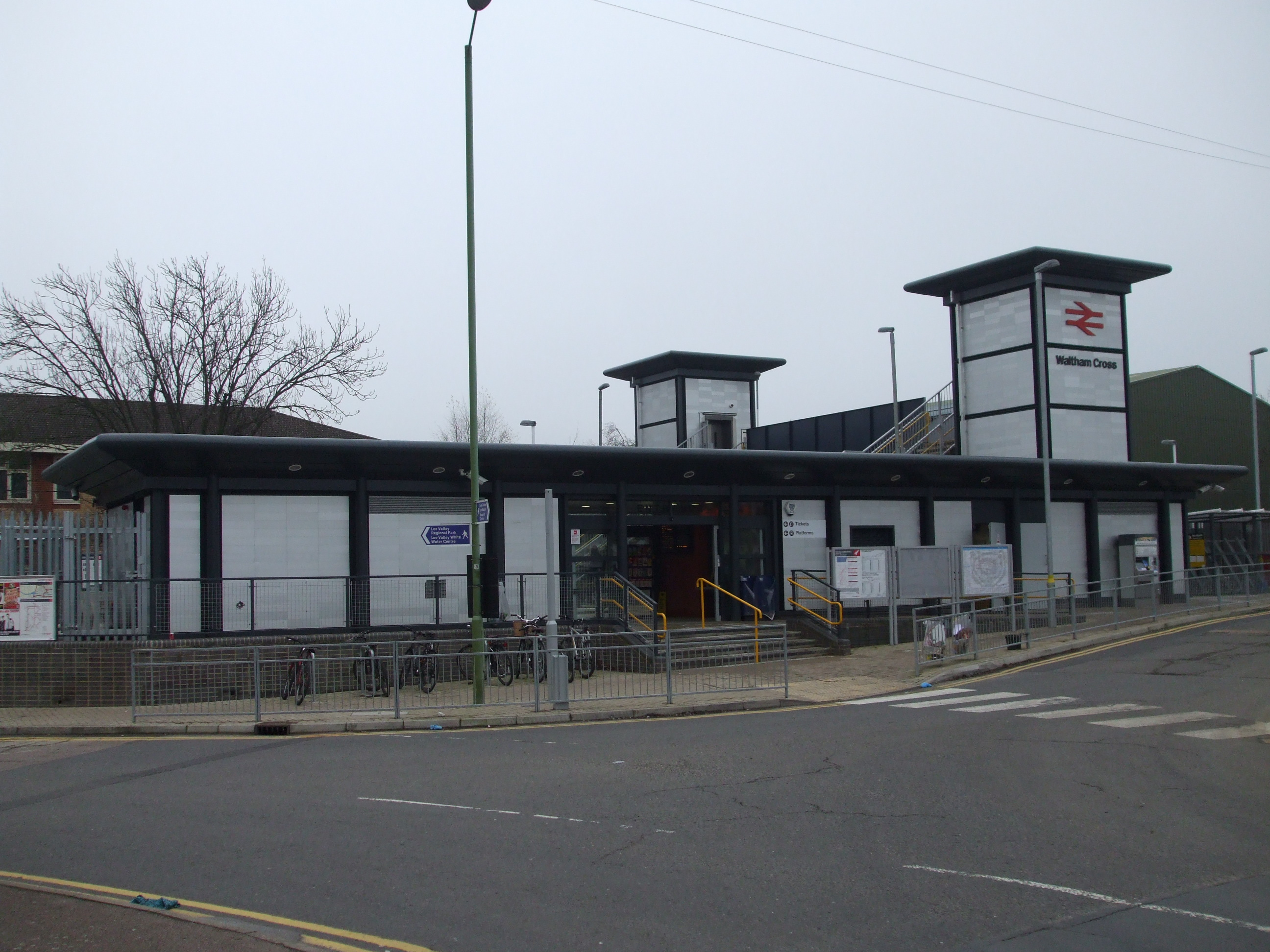
- Station building in January 2013
- Interactive map of Waltham Cross

General information
- Location: Waltham Cross
- Local authority: Borough of Broxbourne
- Grid reference: TL365003
- Managed by: Greater Anglia
- Owner: Network Rail
- Station code: WLC
- DfT category: E
- Number of platforms: 2
- Fare zone: 7

National Rail annual entry and exit
- 2020–21: ▼0.423 million
- 2021–22: ▲0.854 million
- 2022–23: ▲1.095 million
- 2023–24: ▲1.213 million
- 2024–25: ▲1.298 million

Railway companies
- Original company: Northern and Eastern Railway
- Pre-grouping: Great Eastern Railway
- Post-grouping: London and North Eastern Railway

Key dates
- 1842 1840.: First station opened as Waltham
- 1 December 1882: Renamed Waltham Cross
- 1885: Re-sited
- 1 May 1894: Renamed Waltham Cross & Abbey
- 20 February 1969: Renamed Waltham Cross

Other information
- External links: Departures; Facilities
- Coordinates: 51.6851°N 0.0266°W

Waltham Cross railway station is on the Lea Valley Lines, serving the suburban town of Waltham Cross in Hertfordshire, and the neighbouring Waltham Abbey in Essex, England. It is 12 miles 63 chains (20.6 km) down the line from London Liverpool Street and is situated between Enfield Lock and Cheshunt. Its three-letter station code is WLC and it is in London fare zone 7.

The station and all trains serving it are operated by Greater Anglia. The station has 4 Oyster card readers rather than ticket barriers.

During the 2012 Olympic Games, Waltham Cross and Cheshunt provided the main rail access to the Lee Valley White Water Centre.

== History ==
=== Early years (1840–1862) ===
The first station, together with the railway line from Stratford to Broxbourne, was opened by the Northern & Eastern Railway (N&ER) on 15 September 1840. Originally called Waltham and later renamed to Waltham Cross, it was originally on a site to the north of the road between Waltham Cross and Waltham Abbey.

Following on from negotiations in 1843, the Eastern Counties Railway took over operation of the N&ER from 1 January 1844 paying rent and dividing the profits.

By the 1860s the railways in East Anglia were in financial trouble, and most were leased to the ECR; they wished to amalgamate formally, but could not obtain government agreement for this until 1862, when the Great Eastern Railway was formed by amalgamation. Thus Waltham Cross became a GER station in 1862.

=== Great Eastern Railway (1862–1922) ===
A signal box was provided in 1881 on the up side just north of the road bridge. Many years later when the road was widened the box was actually located under the bridge itself.

In 1885 the station was relocated to the current site south of the road bridge. A subsequent renaming to Waltham Cross and Abbey was later rescinded.

In 1911 the Waltham Abbey and Cheshunt Gas & Coke Co had two sidings on the down side north of the station. A three siding goods yard was located on the up side of the line.

=== London & North Eastern Railway (1923–1947) ===
On 1 January 1923 the GER became part of the London and North Eastern Railway. During World War 2 the yards were busy with traffic from the Lea Valley armaments industry.

=== British Railways (1948–1994) ===
The nationalisation of Britain's railways saw the operation of Waltham Cross station pass to British Railways Eastern Region.

From 1958 local passenger services between Cheshunt and London via Tottenham Hale were normally operated by Class 125 diesel multiple units.

As late as the early 1960s the goods yards located north of the station were busy in traffic but these were closed in the 1960s in preparation of the electrification of the Lea Valley line.

The mechanical signal box was closed on 13 January 1969 with its duties being taken over by a panel at Brimsdown. The lines through Waltham Cross were electrified on 5 May 1969.

=== The Privatisation area (1994–current) ===
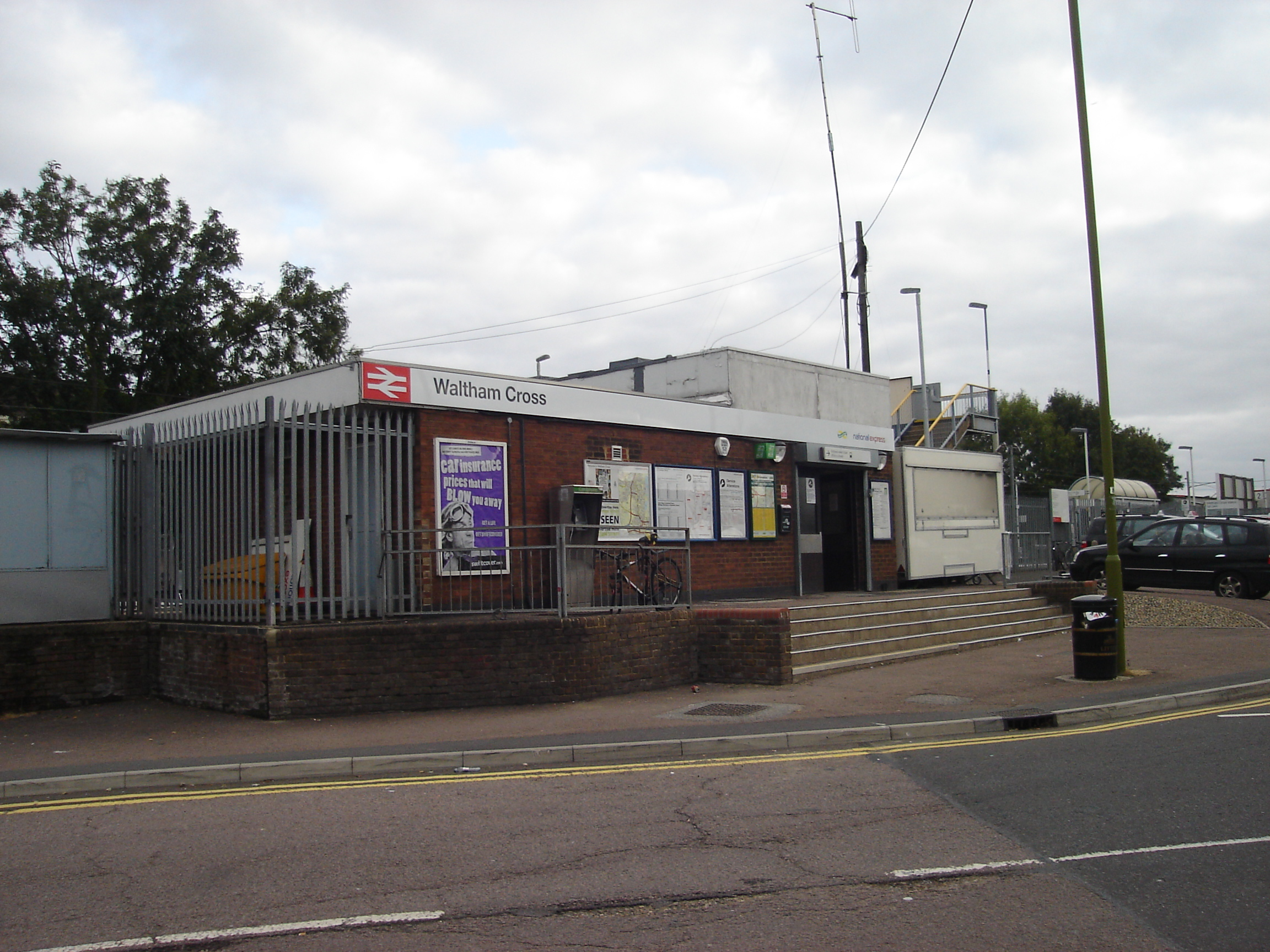
The station building in September 2009, prior to the 2011 redevelopment

In 2011, a major redevelopment was carried out at the station in preparation for the London 2012 Olympics.

From 2 January 2013, Oyster cards are accepted at the station. The station is in London fare zone 7.

== Service ==
The typical off-peak service between Monday-Saturday is two trains per hour to London Liverpool Street via Tottenham Hale, two trains per hour to Hertford East, one train per hour to Stratford, and one train per hour to Bishops Stortford.

Additional services, including additional services to and from Cambridge/Ely and Liverpool Street call at the station during peak hours. During this period, the Hertford East service becomes hourly.

There is also one train per weekday to Ely in the early mornings.

On Sunday, the typical off-peak service is two trains per hour to Stratford via Tottenham Hale and two trains per hour to Hertford East.

Preceding station	National Rail	Following station
Enfield Lock	Greater Anglia Lea Valley Lines	Cheshunt

== Connections ==
London Bus routes 279, 217, 317, 491, 327 and night route N279; Central Connect routes 13, 13A, 13B, 14, 14X, 15, 15A, 15B and 16; Epping Forest Community Transport routes 211 and 212; Uno route 242 and Arriva Herts & Essex routes 66, 251 and 310 serve the nearby Waltham Cross Bus Station.
