= Enfield Lock railway station =

National Rail station in London, England

Enfield Lock
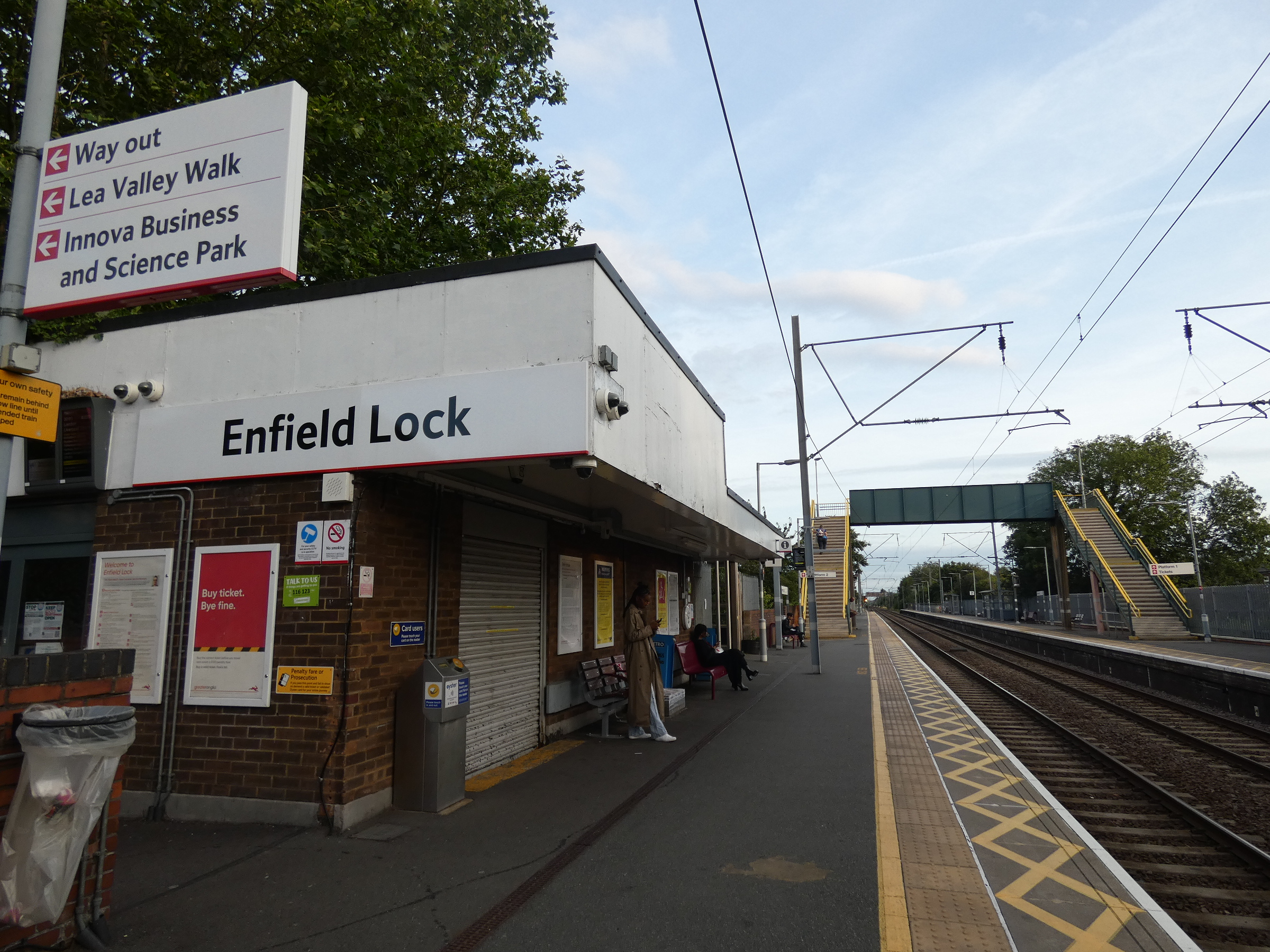
- Enfield Lock Station
- Interactive map of Enfield Lock

General information
- Location: Enfield Lock
- Local authority: London Borough of Enfield
- Managed by: Greater Anglia
- Station code: ENL
- DfT category: E
- Number of platforms: 2
- Accessible: Yes
- Fare zone: 6

National Rail annual entry and exit
- 2020–21: ▼0.515 million
- 2021–22: ▲0.960 million
- 2022–23: ▲1.184 million
- 2023–24: ▲1.356 million
- 2024–25: ▲1.459 million

Key dates
- 1855: Opened

Other information
- External links: Departures; Facilities
- Coordinates: 51.6709°N 0.0284°W

Enfield Lock railway station is on the West Anglia Main Line, it is in Enfield Lock in the London Borough of Enfield, London. It is 11 miles 65 chains (19.0 km) down the line from London Liverpool Street and is situated between Brimsdown and Waltham Cross. Its three-letter station code is ENL and it is in London fare zone 6.

The station and all trains serving it are operated by Greater Anglia.

Enfield Lock was the main station for the Royal Small Arms Factory until its closure in the late 1980s, and now serves the large housing development on the site known as Enfield Island Village, as well as the nearby Innova Science and Business park.

== History ==
The railway line from Stratford to Broxbourne was opened by the Northern and Eastern Railway on 15 September 1840. The station itself was opened by the Eastern Counties Railway in 1855 as Ordnance Factory, later renamed in 1886 to Enfield Lock.

The lines through Enfield Lock were electrified on 5 May 1969. Prior to the completion of electrification in 1969, passenger services between Cheshunt and London Liverpool Street through Enfield Lock station were normally operated by Class 125 diesel multiple units (which had been purpose-built for the line in 1958).

== Services ==
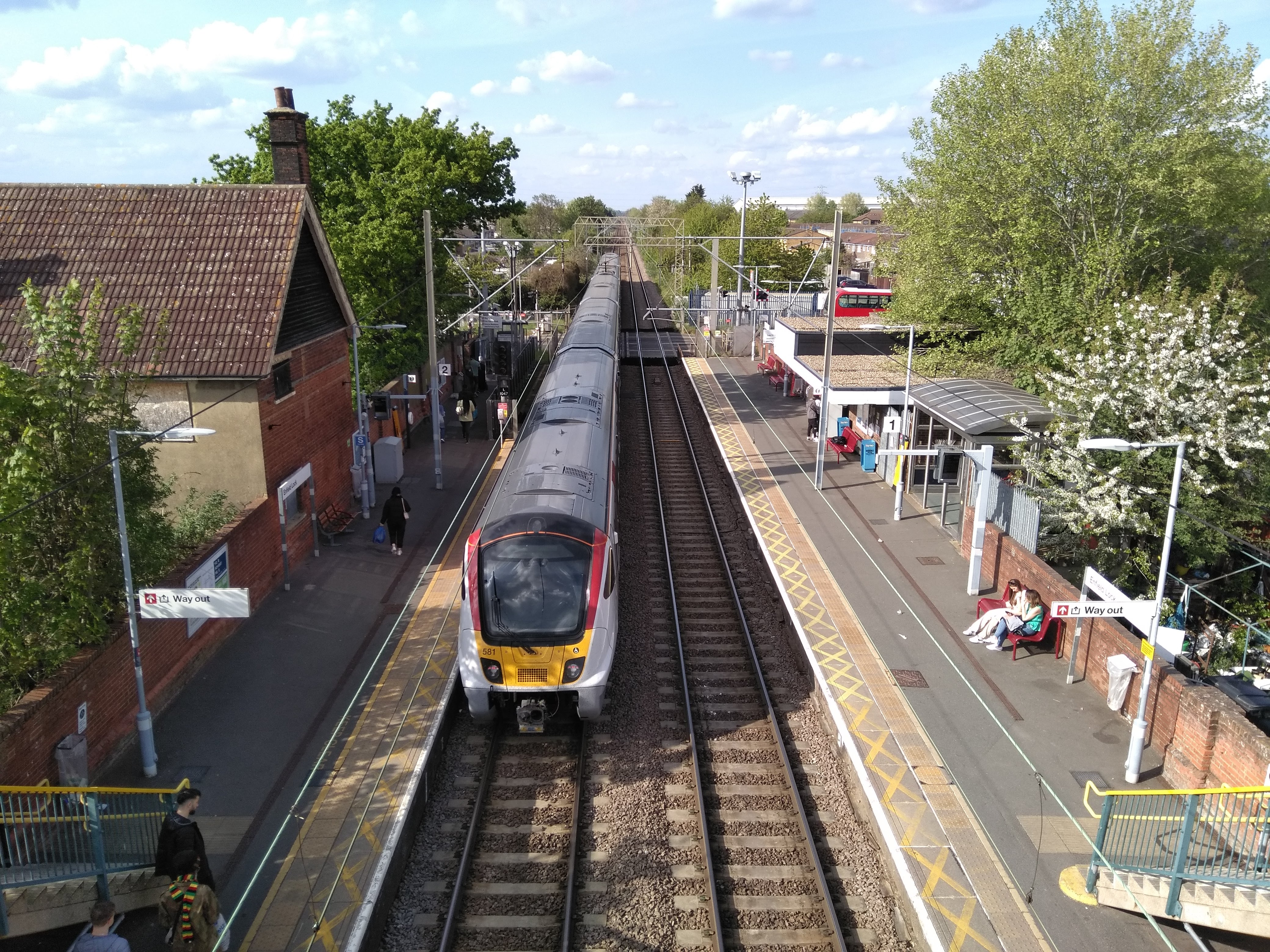
View from the footbridge at Enfield Lock Station

All services at Enfield Lock are operated by Greater Anglia using Class 720 EMUs.

The typical off-peak service in trains per hour is:

- 2 tph to London Liverpool Street
- 1 tph to Stratford
- 2 tph to Hertford East
- 1 tph to Bishop's Stortford

During peak periods, the services to Stratford and Hertford East increase to 2 and 3tph respectively.

There is also one train per weekday to Ely in the early mornings.

On Sundays, the services to Liverpool Street and Bishop's Stortford do not run and station is instead served by a half-hourly service between Stratford and Hertford East.

Preceding station	National Rail	Following station
Brimsdown	Greater Anglia Lea Valley lines	Waltham Cross
Northumberland Park	Greater Anglia Lea Valley lines	Waltham Cross

== Connections ==
London Buses routes 121 and 491 serve the station.

== See also ==
- Enfield Town railway station
- Enfield Chase railway station
