= Camley Street =

Street in London, England

Coordinates: 51.5379°N 0.1304°W

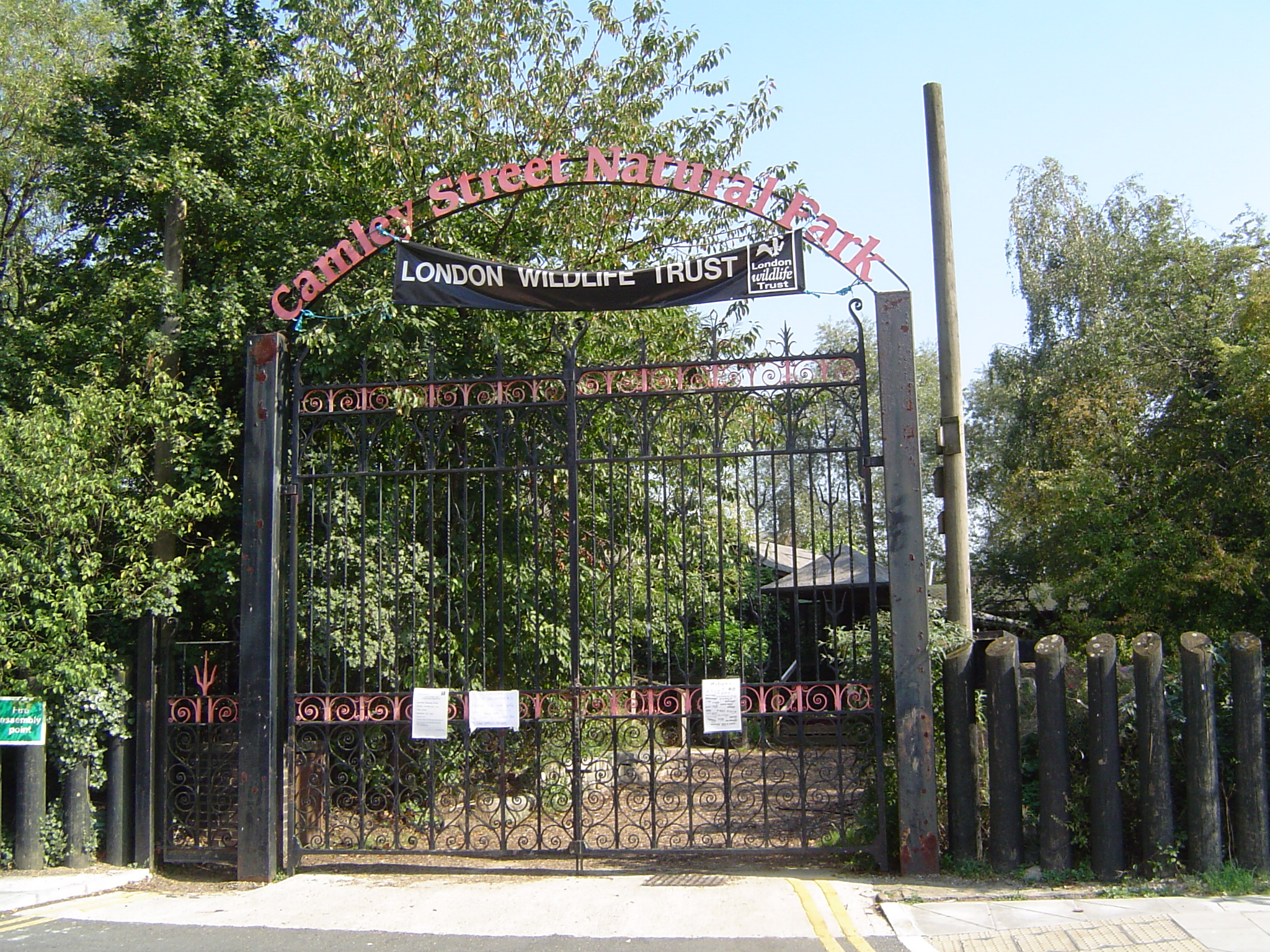
The entrance to the Camley Street Natural Park from Camley Street. The nature reserve occupies the most south-eastern part of Camley Street, between the St Pancras Basin and St Pancras railway station.

Camley Street is a street in the London Borough of Camden in London, England. It lies in St Pancras and King's Cross: stretching over a kilometre from St Pancras railway station in the south, over the Regent's Canal, and to Agar Grove in the north.

Camley Street is the location of Camley Street Natural Park, a local nature reserve. Adjacent to the natural park is St Pancras Basin, home to the St Pancras Cruising Club. That section of Camley Street is home to three separate grade II-listed buildings: the St Pancras Coroner's Court, the Victorian water tower at St Pancras Basin, and the lock-keeper's cottage by St Pancras Lock. There is also an entrance to St Pancras Gardens (part of St Pancras Old Church).

The northern half of the street is home to a number of large developments. Where Camley Street crosses the Regent's Canal, there are three large developments - 101 Camley Street to the bridge's south-west, 102 Camley Street to the bridge's north-east, and 103 Camley Street to the bridge's north-east. Further north, Camley Street proves the eastern access route into the Elm Village estate (formerly the location of Agar Town) and Abacus Belsize Primary School. The north-eastern side of Camley Street is home to one of Camden's largest industrial estates, which is also being redeveloped in a major £136m redevelopment.

Camley Street has its own Neighbourhood Forum and draft Neighbourhood Plan: one of the few streets in the country to have a Forum dedicated to it. The Camley Street Neighbourhood Forum split out of the Kings Cross Neighbourhood Forum.

Developments on Camley Street have been subject to a long dispute in Camden London Borough Council, after the council proposed redevelopment of the street.
