= Parks and open spaces in the London Borough of Camden =

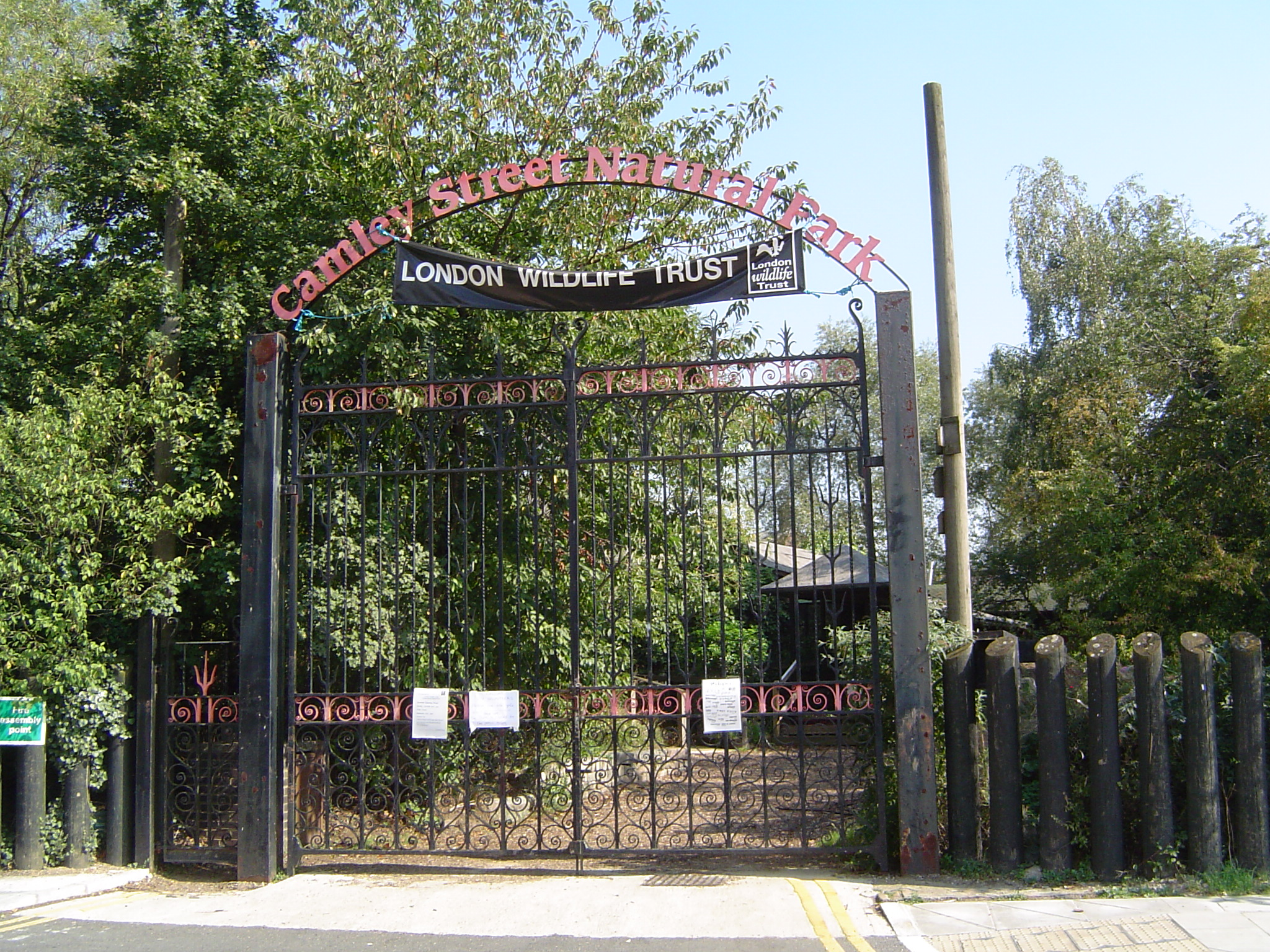
The entrance to the Camley Street Natural Park, behind London King's Cross.

The London Borough of Camden is in percentage terms the second-greenest of the Inner London boroughs (based on public green spaces). (Note: Surpassed by Westminster in percentage terms; in absolute terms, it is either first, second or third in public green space, close in scale to Wandsworth and Greenwich.) It contains most of the swathe of land Hampstead Heath and many smaller green spaces. The Central London part of the borough, south of Euston Road, is characterised by its elegant garden squares with large instances: Tavistock Square and Bedford Square. In this part runs the Regent's Canal (a 'Green Route') around the top edge of Regent's Park, a little of which is in Camden, including all of the associated Primrose Hill. Highgate Cemetery is in Camden but Highgate Wood is in the neighbouring borough of Haringey.

Apart from Camden Council, a variety of agencies are responsible for the upkeep of open space in the borough. For example, Hampstead Heath is mostly owned by the City of London Corporation save Kenwood House which has an area of lawns, ponds and flower beds undivided from the heath, owned by English Heritage. Highgate Cemetery is managed by its own trust. (Note: Highgate Cemetery Ltd) The Phoenix Garden is managed by an independent charity.

Some open spaces of note:

- Bloomsbury Square
- Brunswick Square
- Coram's Fields
- Gordon Square
- Hampstead Heath (681 acres (2.8 km^{2}) in Camden, 110 acres (0.4 km^{2}) in next-door Barnet)
- Highgate Cemetery
- The Hill Garden and Pergola - see Thomas Hayton Mawson
- Kilburn Grange Park
- Lincoln's Inn Fields (the largest public square in London)
- Phoenix Garden (the only community garden in Soho and Covent Garden)
- Primrose Hill
- Regent's Park (part of)
- Russell Square
- Talacre Gardens
- Tavistock Square
- St James' Gardens
- St Martin's Gardens
- St Pancras Old Church Gardens
- Waterlow Park

== Nature reserves ==
The borough has four Local Nature Reserves:

- Adelaide Nature Reserve
- Belsize Wood
- Camley Street Natural Park
- Westbere Copse

It has one Site of Special Scientific Interest:

- Hampstead Heath Woods

== See also ==
- List of Sites of Special Scientific Interest in Greater London
