= Camden Lock =

Grade II listed lock in London Borough of Camden, UK

Hampstead Road Lock No 1 (Camden Lock)
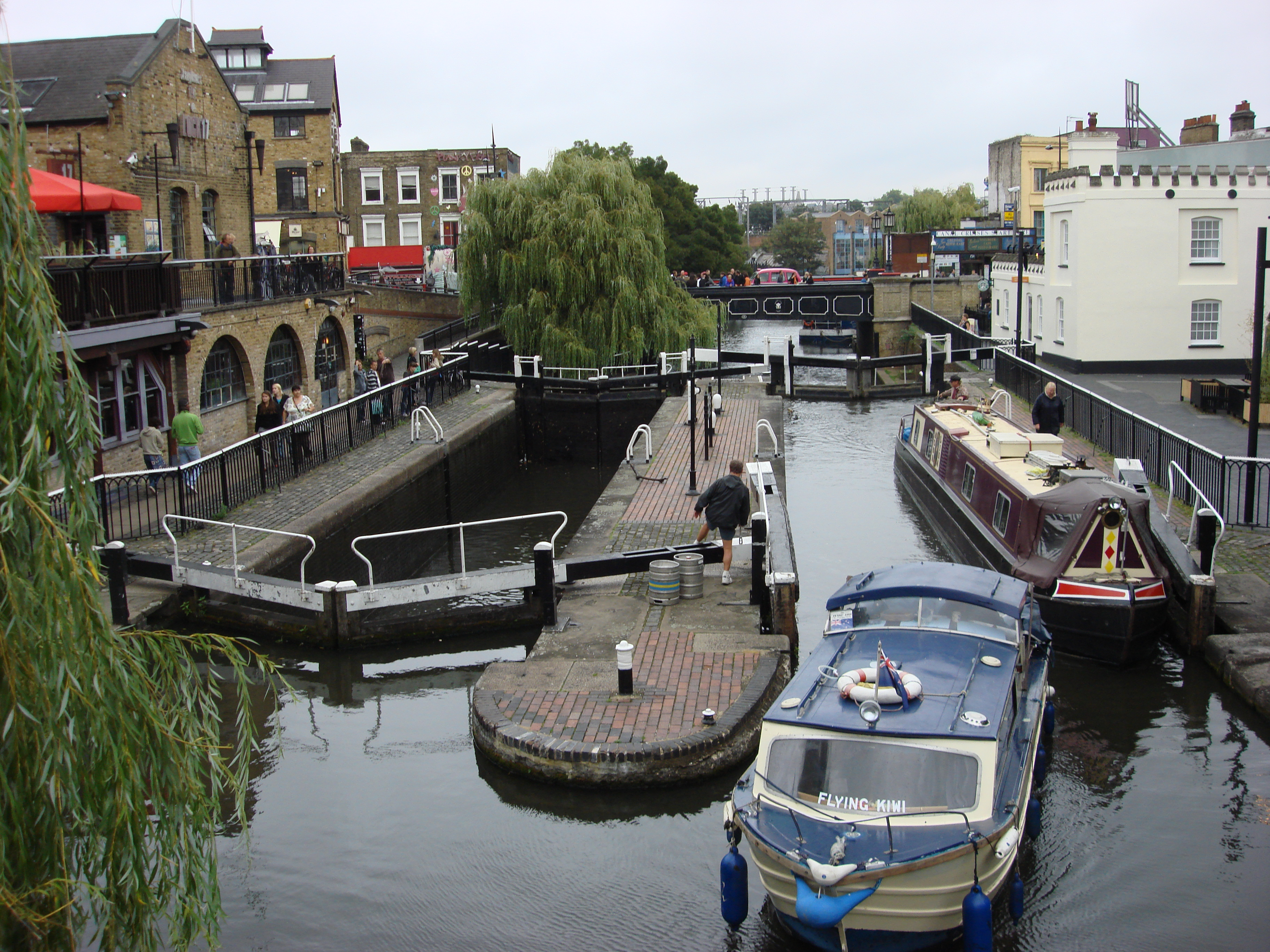
- The twin locks
- Interactive map of Hampstead Road Lock No 1 (Camden Lock)
- 51.5411°N 0.1457°W
- Waterway: Regent's Canal
- County: Camden; Greater London
- Maintained by: Canal & River Trust
- Operation: Manual
- Fall: 8 feet (2.4 m)
- Distance to Limehouse Basin: 6.17 miles (9.9 km)
- Distance to Paddington Basin: 2.77 miles (4.5 km)

Camden Lock is a small part of Camden Town, London Borough of Camden, England, which was formerly a wharf with stables on the Regent's Canal. It is immediately to the north of Hampstead Road Locks, a twin manually operated lock. The twin locks together are "Hampstead Road Lock 1"; each bears a sign so marked. Hawley Lock and Kentish Town Lock are a short distance away to the east; to the west is a long level pound (also known as tract or reach) – it is 27 miles (43 km) to the next lock.

== Physical layout ==
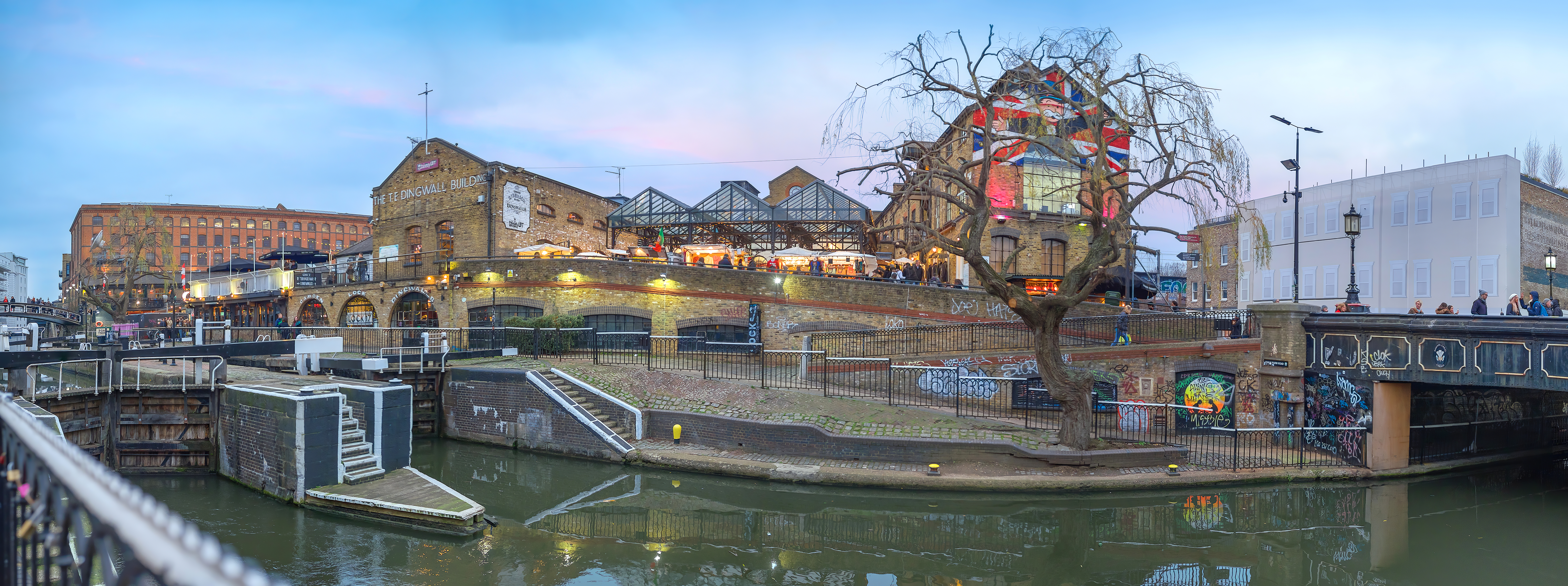
Camden Lock panorama at sunset

The lock is to the west of the Camden High Street road bridge. When the canal was built, the road was carried over it by a brick bridge, but this was found to be inadequate, and was replaced by a cast iron girder bridge in 1878. The cost was met by the St Pancras Vestry and the Metropolitan Board of Works, and the bridge, which has brick abutments with stone coping, carries a plaque recording this fact. Like the lock, it is Grade II listed.

At the south-east corner of the lock is a building dating from 1815, which was originally constructed to house air compressors for Congreve's boat lift. It was subsequently used as the lock keeper's cottage, and by 2010 had become a Starbucks coffee shop. The building was extended in 1975, when it was also stuccoed, and a crenellated parapet was added.

To the west of the lock is a cast iron roving bridge, dating from the early or mid-19th century. The official name for this bridge on UK Government websites is "Roving Bridge Over Grand Union Canal West of Hampstead Road Lock". This is commonly referred to as the "Roving Bridge" at Hampstead Road Locks, or alternatively as the "diagonal bridge" It is diagonal across the lock, due to the layout of the nearby docks when it was built in 1816. It had wrought iron tension stays when built, but these were replaced by steel cables in the late 20th century, when the deck was also replaced. According to the website of Camden Railroad Heritage Trust:

The Regent’s Canal Company decided in mid-1846, after the Roving Bridge had been completed, to provide horses for towing. The stabling at Hampstead Road Locks provided stalls for up to 18 horses. Barges in the southern lock had to be towed across to the northern bank to continue their journey. The rope would pass under the Roving Bridge on the upstream side to be attached to the horse, now on the bridge. The horse then pulled the barge across to the other bank. The force on the rope required to turn the barge against the flow of canal water was so great that the parapet rail of the bridge and the stone parapet of the abutments are deeply scored, evidence of past operations.

According to the UK website "Local local history":

...barges travelling up-stream were raised by the lock to the level of the Lock Basin but, when they reached the top they had no motion. The barges were still and had to be towed. ....the barges which had come up on the right hand lock had to be towed across to the towpath bank, before they could continue their journey. This was the purpose of the Roving Bridge.

The towpath is on the northern bank of the canal at this point, and is carried over the entrance to a dock which formed part of Camden Goods Depot by a cast iron single span bridge with stone capped abutments. It was constructed by J Deeley and Co, of Newport in Monmouthshire between 1848 and 1856. The granite setts which form the approach ramps were taken up and relaid in 1978.

== History ==
Regent's Canal was authorised by an act of Parliament, the Regent's Canal Act 1812 (52 Geo. 3. c. cxcv), obtained on 13 July 1812, for a canal from Paddington to Limehouse. When the directors first met, they had decided that all locks would be paired, so that some of the water from a lock emptying could be used to fill the adjacent chamber. Water saving was an important factor, as they knew that water supply would be problematic. Colonel William Congreve, a military engineer who was later knighted, proposed the use of hydropneumatic boat lifts instead of locks. Various designs of a similar nature had been tried in the early 19th century, notably at Mells on the Dorset and Somerset Canal and at Tardebigge on the Worcester and Birmingham Canal, but none had proved successful. Congreve's design used two water-filled caissons, which were moved up and down by hand, assisted by compressed air trapped beneath the tanks. With no working examples of such lifts, the directors were understandably cautious, but following an engineer's report, decided that Maudslay & Co should build a prototype at Camden Town. There were a number of technical problems, with the canal company blaming Maudslays for poor design, and Maudslays blaming the canal company for changing the original design and failing to maintain the structure. Congreve's claim that it could be operated in just three minutes was never proved, and in 1818, the directors decided to cut their losses, and reverted to using paired locks. The lift was sold at auction in November 1819, and the 13 lots raised just £404.

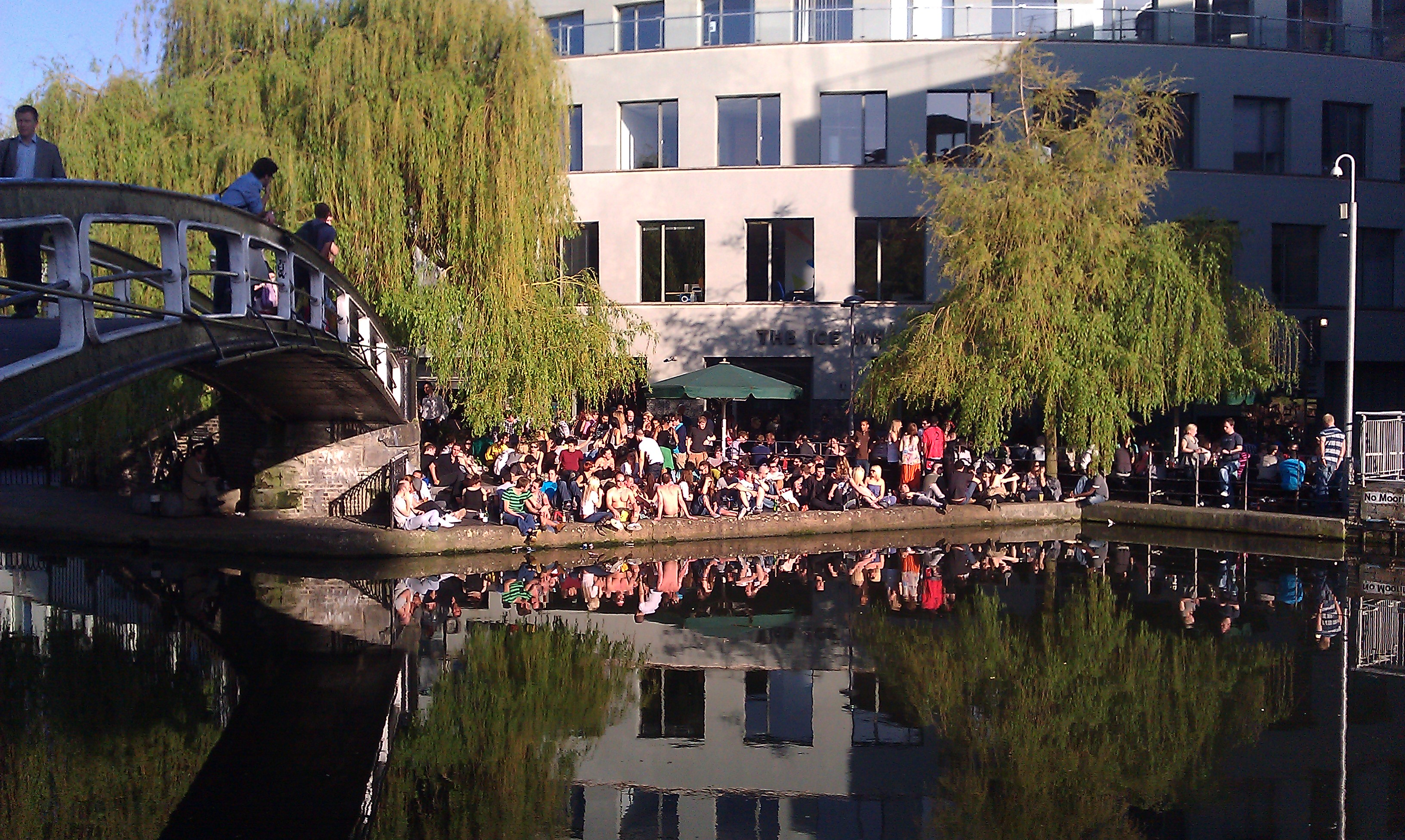
A warm summer day at Camden Lock

Construction of the canal was overseen by architect John Nash, with James Morgan acting as supervising engineer. Hampstead Road Locks were built between 1818 and 1820, with the chambers made of brick and stone coping along the top. The two locks are arranged side by side, with an island platform between them. Each chamber has two gates at both ends, and they have been Grade II listed since 1992 (this is the initial, most common category of listing). They were the first of 12 pairs of similar locks which dropped the level of the canal by 96 feet (29 m) to reach Limehouse Basin. The transfer of water between the chambers made operation of the locks more complex, and so they were permanently manned during the heyday of the canal, with lock-keepers working a shift system to provide 24-hour cover. As the use of the canal declined, in part due to railway competition, manning levels were reduced, and padlocks were used to prevent operation of the locks at the weekends.

Following the end of commercial traffic and the growth of leisure boating, the locks reverted to operation by boat crews, and in order to prevent flooding caused by incorrect operation of the paddles, in the 1980s most of the pairs were converted to single locks, by replacing the lower gates of one chamber with a fixed weir. Hampstead Road Lock is the only one where both chambers have been retained, although they are now emptied conventionally. In November 2013, the lock 1B (by the market) was fully drained for maintenance; the public were invited for the weekend of the 16th and 17th of that month to see the infrastructure for themselves. A similar operation was carried out on lock 1A in 2016.

=== Camden Goods Depot ===
Camden Goods Depot was the London freight terminus of the London and Birmingham Railway, the first inter-city railway to reach London. Robert Stephenson was the engineer in charge of the project, and he picked the site for the goods depot so that direct interchange with the Regent's Canal was available, from where freight could reach the London docks. A 25-acre (10 ha) site on the north bank of the canal was obtained from Lord Southampton in January 1837, and the goods depot was completed in 1839. Major features were a stationary winding engine house, which was used to pull trains up the incline from Euston to Camden, a shed for stabling of locomotives, 18 coke ovens which were used to make smokeless fuel, two goods sheds, stables for 50 horses, a wagon repair shop, and various ancillary buildings. Much of the site was supported on brick vaults. Pickfords, the public carrier, built a warehouse on the south bank of the canal in 1841. It was designed by William Cubitt, was extended in 1846, and was the first rail, road and canal interchange building in Britain, being linked to the goods depot by a wooden railway bridge over the canal.

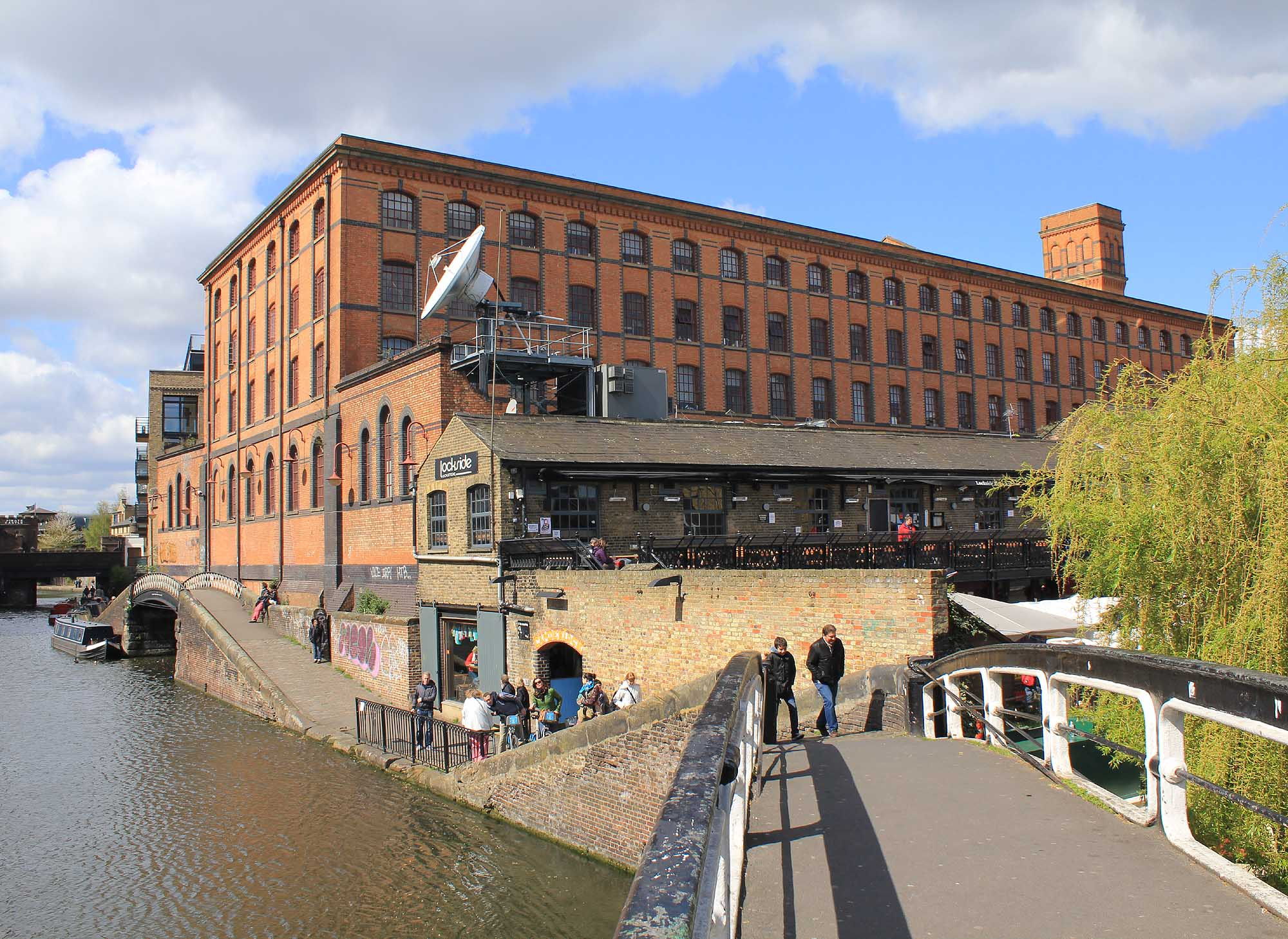
The Interchange building, where goods were transferred to canal boats, is now the offices of Associated Press Television News.

In 1846, the London and Birmingham Railway merged with several other railway companies to become the London and North Western Railway (LNWR). Just prior to the merger, they decided to build their own interchange facilities, rather than using Pickfords, and this was carried out by the LNWR. Semple's Wharf, on the north bank of the canal, was purchased, and the towpath bridge was built by 1846. A basin and dock were built once the sale of the wharf was completed in 1847, and a new rail link to the goods depot was added. As part of this expansion, two new engine sheds were built, one to the north of the tracks for goods locomotives, and one to the south for passenger locomotives. The southern shed was demolished in 1966, but the northern one, known as the Roundhouse, is Grade II* listed. A second wooden railway bridge crossed the canal to the former Pickfords warehouse.

Following the construction on lines to link to the East India and West India Docks in 1851, which became the North London Railway in 1853, further upgrading of the goods depot was necessary to cope with the volumes of traffic. This took place between 1854 and 1856, and included the enlargement and realignment of the canal basin. When completed, it was 210 by 45 feet (64 by 14 m) with railway tracks on both sides running to the edge of the canal. Four new stable blocks were built next to the Hampstead Road, and the complex was linked to the marshalling yards by the Eastern Horse Tunnel. A Western Horse Tunnel was also built to link the goods depot to new stables near the present Gloucester Avenue, to the west of the mainline tracks. In 1864, the LNWR built a new goods shed, at the time the largest in the country, and in 1876, additional stables were built to the north of Gloucester Avenue. Access to the Western Horse Tunnel was by a set of horse stairs, which have survived. The LNWR good shed was enlarged in 1931, but subsequently demolished. The goods depot closed around 1980, and many of the stables were demolished in 2000. The Interchange Warehouse was remodelled in 1989, to become offices, and further restoration work occurred in 2007, when some of the later additions were removed. It is now known as The Interchange.

Despite some demolition, the complex of buildings, which includes parts of the goods depot, the winding engine house, the Roundhouse, the eastern portal of Primrose Hill railway tunnel, and the canal, represent one of the most important groupings of 19th-century transport infrastructure to have survived in Britain. The survival of the horse tunnel and stairs shows the importance of horse-drawn transport in the developing railway system.

=== Restoration 1960s to present ===
Commercial traffic on the Regent's Canal had almost ceased by the late 1960s, and the area had become run down. Much of the industry had moved away, partly as a result of the passing of the Clean Air Act 1956, but also helped by government grants to encourage companies to move away from the city. The area around Hampstead Road Locks was populated by disused warehouses, derelict land and a towpath which desperately needed some repairs to be made. In addition, the area was blighted by the proposed London Motorway Box, which would have seen much of the canal culverted, and a sliproad built over the site of the locks. To the north of the lock was a wharf, owned by British Waterways, but rented out to Dingwall's since 1946. The company made packing cases, but their business had been hit by the change to containers, and in 1971 they decided to sell up. They had about ten years left on a 25-year lease.

The lease was bought by Northside Developments, a limited company which had been formed by Bill Fulford and Peter Wheeler, and had previously been involved in turning large houses into flats in south London. Their proposal for the yard was to create workshops, where people worked and sold their produce. They also hoped the development would include a restaurant and cinema. They approached Camden Council, who had wanted to bulldoze the whole area, and persuaded them that some of the heritage assets were worth saving. Northside were advised against including a market in their planning application by the council, and in April 1972 received planning permission for a temporary development, lasting three years, by which time the outcome of the motorway scheme would be known. With such a short lease, funding the scheme had its problems, and several joint companies were created to divide the investment into smaller packets. The plans included workshops, restaurants, sculpture studios, a snack bar, a mooring area for canal boats, and an office. The lease was soon extended to run until 1980, but Northside were refused permission to run a market on Saturdays in the yard and on Commercial Place, the road from which access to the site was gained.

On a very limited budget of £5,000, Northside set about converting the existing buildings into craft workshops. No new buildings were erected, as the whole area was still scheduled for demolition. By mid-1972, parts of the West Yard were ready to be used as workshops, and businesses began to occupy them. An official opening was held on 4 April 1973, with the Mayor of Camden presiding, and this was followed by a three-day display of work by the fifty people who were by then occupying the workshops. Plans for the motorway were dropped soon afterwards. Northside then obtained a development lease, but applications to demolish and replace many of the buildings were successfully resisted by a tenants' association, formed by the craft workers. Newspapers reported the conflicts, and the publicity drew in visitors from a much wider area.

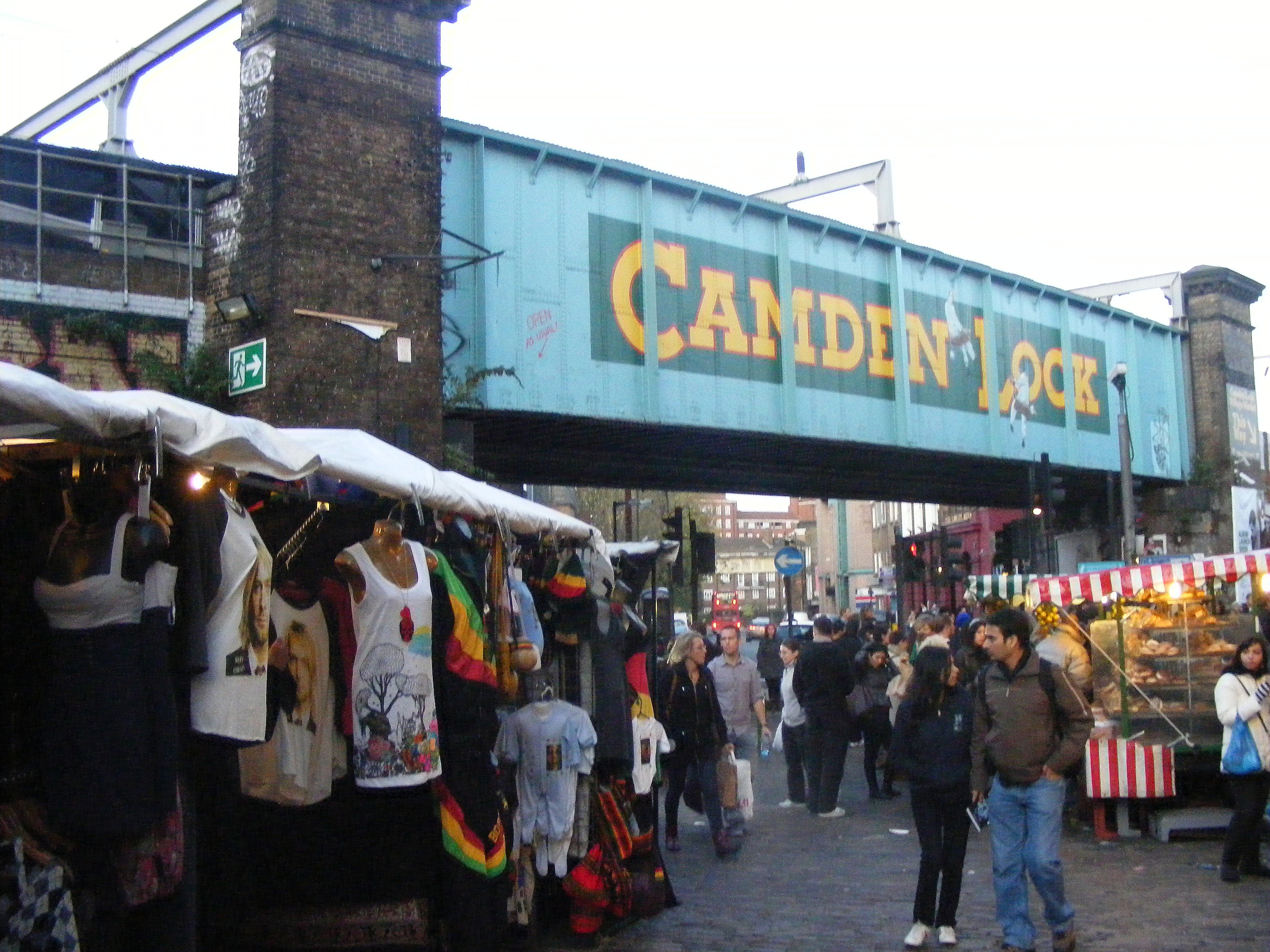
The North London line railway bridge over Chalk Farm Road from Camden Lock Place, a pedestrian-only road with open-air and permanent stalls, and entrances to some of the Camden markets

The towpath through the area of Hampstead Road Locks was upgraded and a formal opening was held on 20 May 1972. The next major development was Dingwall's Dance Hall, which occupied the former warehouse used by the packing case company and opened in June 1973. It featured live music, and in order to stay open until 2am, the terms of the licence required an entrance fee to be charged, which was set at 50 pence by the licensing authority. Regular customers included David Hockney, Lucian Freud and George Melly, and it soon became well known as a venue for punk rock bands. Northside next obtained permission to run a Saturday antiques market in January 1974. It would run through the summer months of that year only, with a maximum of 60 stalls, set out in the yard and in a corrugated iron shed. When it opened, there were 12 stallholders, but this soon increased to 30. Better access to the canal towpath was created by knocking a hole in the wall that separated it from the East Yard. The towpath from London Zoo to Camden High Street was then opened for public access, following a campaign by the Regent's Canal Group.

The market was a success, and within a year Northside had obtained permission to extend it to Sundays and Bank Holidays. Soon there were two restaurants on the site, and the range of goods for sale on the stalls became much wider. In the 1976 Conservation Awards run by The Times newspaper and the Royal Institution of Chartered Surveyors, the market came joint third. By the early 1980, the market consisted of nearly 200 stalls, which were occupied by around 100 regular stallholders and many temporary ones. It attracted around 11,000 visitors each weekend. In addition, there were 39 businesses based in the craft workshops. Northside now decided that it was time to change the name of the access road from Commercial Place. The area had been known informally as Camden Lock for some time, and so they campaigned for it to become Camden Lock Place. Despite objections from the fire brigade, the Greater London Council eventually sanctioned the name change, and from then on, the site was marketed as Camden Lock. It became a venue for events, including a five-week Festival of Entertainment, a Clock Festival, and Gerry Cottle's Circus was also booked. British Rail carried out repairs to the railway bridge over Chalk Farm Road in the mid-1980s, and when the work was completed, the hoardings were not replaced. After long negotiations, Northside were granted permission to paint the bridge in 1989, and employed mural artist John Bulley to paint the words Camden Lock in giant letters on the superstructure, together with representations of two painters, painting the letters.

== Current state of development ==
By the late 1980s, Camden Lock was attracting increasing numbers of foreign tourists to the market. In the early days, the emphasis had been on hand-crafted goods, but there was a steady increase in mass-produced goods on sale, and some concern locally that Camden Town would be taken over by tourists, and lose its local amenities. Some of the craft units had become retail shops, and there was a problem with the large amount of litter that the market produced. Northside's lease only ran to the end of the 1980s, and so they proposed a £10 million redevelopment, jointly managed by UK Land Limited. They promised new shops, a new pub, and a new market yard, which would be open throughout the week, rather than just at weekends. The plans included a Victorian style retail hall, which would provide indoor accommodation for some of the market. A four-storey building was erected, fronting Chalk Farm Road, and the space between it and Dingwalls, which had been the site of the original market in the 1970s, was covered by a glazed cast iron and brick structure the designs for which were based on a Victorian gas showroom. Dingwalls Dance Hall was refurbished, and a comedy club was built in the East Yard.

The second phase of redevelopment began after the bridge sign had been painted. In January 1990 the mural was awarded an environment award by the Evening Standard, which declared it to be "a credit to London". Despite the increased timescales and costs of doing so, Northside attempted to redevelop the East Yard without closing the market, in order to retain its vibrancy. The work was completed by the summer of 1991, and although there were detractors and accusations of commercialism, it proved to be a success. Some 10 million people were visiting the various Camden markets each year, generating a turnover of an estimated £50 million. During the week, trade in the market hall was slow, as few market traders wanted to be there all week, but Northside suggested that the traders form small co-operatives, and offered discounts for those that did so. This resulted in all of the traders being there at the weekends, but them taking it in turns to look after groups of stalls during the week.

The former Dingwalls yard is now known as Camden Lock Market, and is one of a group of five markets in the vicinity which are collectively called Camden Market. It is a busy market which attracts many visitors, and with music venues, cafes and canal towpath walks, it has become one of London's most popular tourist destinations. There are a number of art installations in the area, including a large cut-steel sculpture by English artist Edward Dutkiewicz in the square beside the lock.

== Culture ==
=== Mentions ===
- Camden Lock was well known in the UK as the address of TV-am's Breakfast Television Centre, the former ITV Breakfast Television franchisee in the 1980s and early 1990s. The address was often displayed on screen for the purpose of correspondence.
- The main spaceship in the British television science fiction sitcom Hyperdrive, which was screened in 2006 and 2007, is called HMS Camden Lock.
- The Italian band Modena City Ramblers wrote a song "Notturno, Camden Lock", with a lyric relating to Camden town where one of the band members lived, on their 1998 album "Raccolti".
- In 2005, Kate Winslet appeared in a television commercial for American Express, strolling around Camden Lock. It was part of a campaign called "My Life, My Card", and in the commercial, Winslet referred to many of the events that have occurred to the characters she has played in films.
- The American band Small Town No Airport, who were based in Massachusetts, recorded a song titled "Camden Locke" on their self-titled 1992 release. The song's lyrics included the line "I met a girl down at Camden Locks; she was selling pictures that she drew with chalks...".
- Camden Lock is one of many landmarks in this area of London to have a corresponding structure underground in Lawrence Leonard's fantasy novel for children, The Horn of Mortal Danger (1980).

=== Artwork ===
Camden and the Lock have become known for artwork and graffiti in recent years. Banksy and King Robbo are both known to have used the wider Camden area to display graffiti. It was also the site of an ongoing feud between the two artists, which lasted from 2009 until 2014.

== Transport ==
=== Camden Lock mooring point ===
Camden Lock mooring point
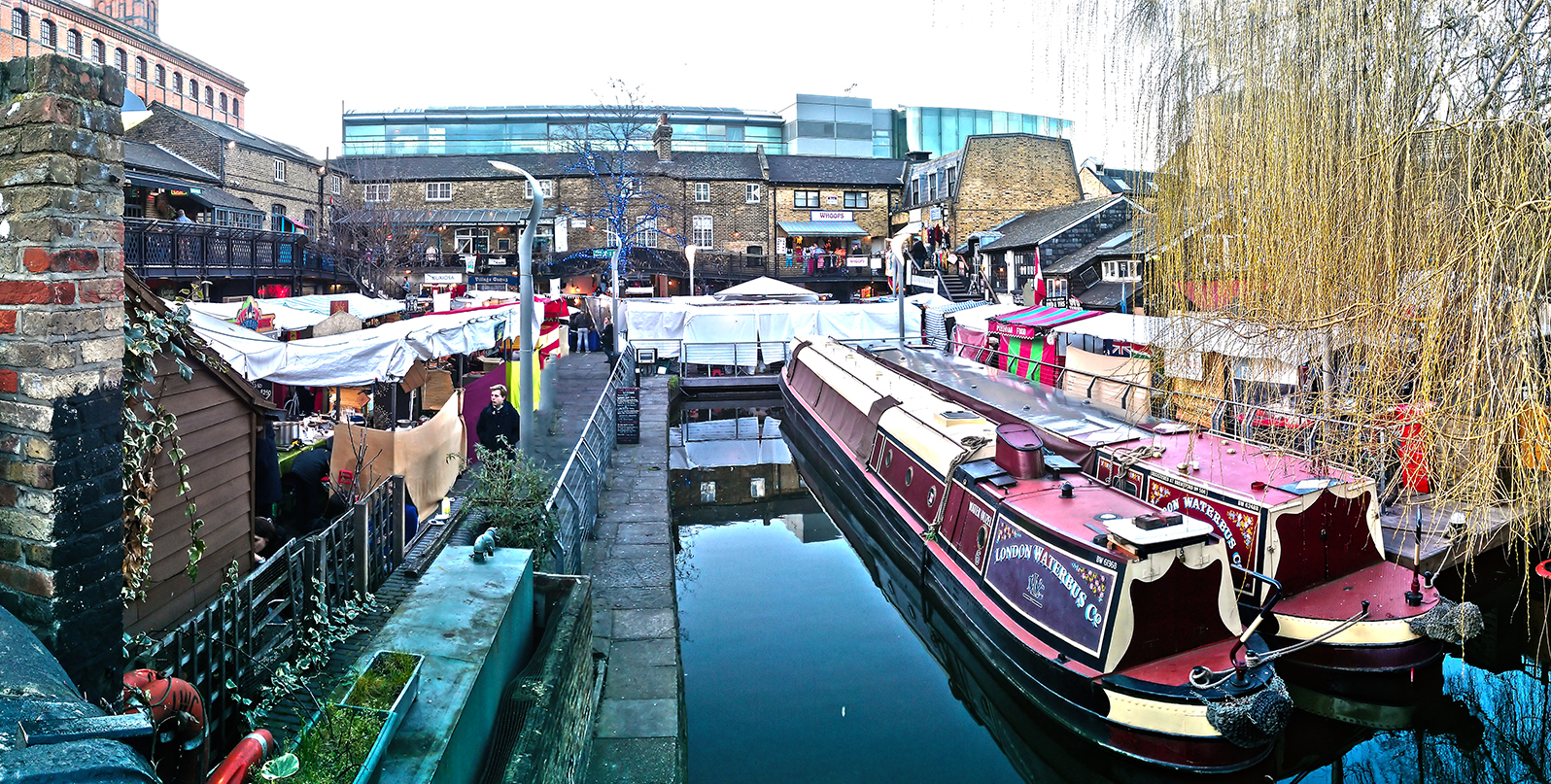
- Type: River bus services
- Location: Camden Town
- Owner: Canal & River Trust
- Operator: London Waterbus Company

The London Waterbus Company waterbus service operates from Camden Lock, heading westwards around Regent's Park, calling at London Zoo and ending at Little Venice. Three of the four boats in use in 2016 were historic vessels on the National Register of Historic Ships.

=== Towpath route ===
The canal tow path is open to pedestrians and cyclists, offering a direct route to Camden Lock from East London, Paddington and West London.

=== Public transport links ===
The nearest London Underground stations are Camden Town and Chalk Farm, both on the Northern line. The nearest London Overground station is Camden Road station.

== Bibliography ==
- Camden (January 2001). "Regents Canal Conservation Area Statement". Camden Council. Archived from the original on 7 September 2012.
- Cumberlidge, Jane (2009). Inland Waterways of Great Britain (8th Ed.). Imray Laurie Norie and Wilson. ISBN 978-1-84623-010-3.
- Darley, Peter (2013). Camden Goods Station Through Time. Amberley Publishing. ISBN 978-1-4456-2204-0.
- Davies, Caitlin (2013). Camden Lock and the Market. Frances Lincoln. ISBN 978-0-7112-3381-2.
- Hadfield, Charles (1970). The Canals of the East Midlands. David and Charles. ISBN 978-0-7153-4871-0.
- Nicholson (2006). Nicholson Guides Vol 1: Grand Union, Oxford & the South East. Harper Collins. ISBN 978-0-00-721109-8.

== See also ==
- Camden Town London website – News about the Camden Markets and Camden Town
- Camden Town Online – (established 1996)
- Canals of the United Kingdom
- History of the British canal system

Next lock upstream	Regent's Canal	Next lock downstream
None - Canal ends at Paddington Basin	Camden Lock; Grid reference: TQ286840	Hawley Lock; No. 2
