= Hawley Lock =

Lock on the Regent's Canal in Camden, London

Hawley Lock No. 2
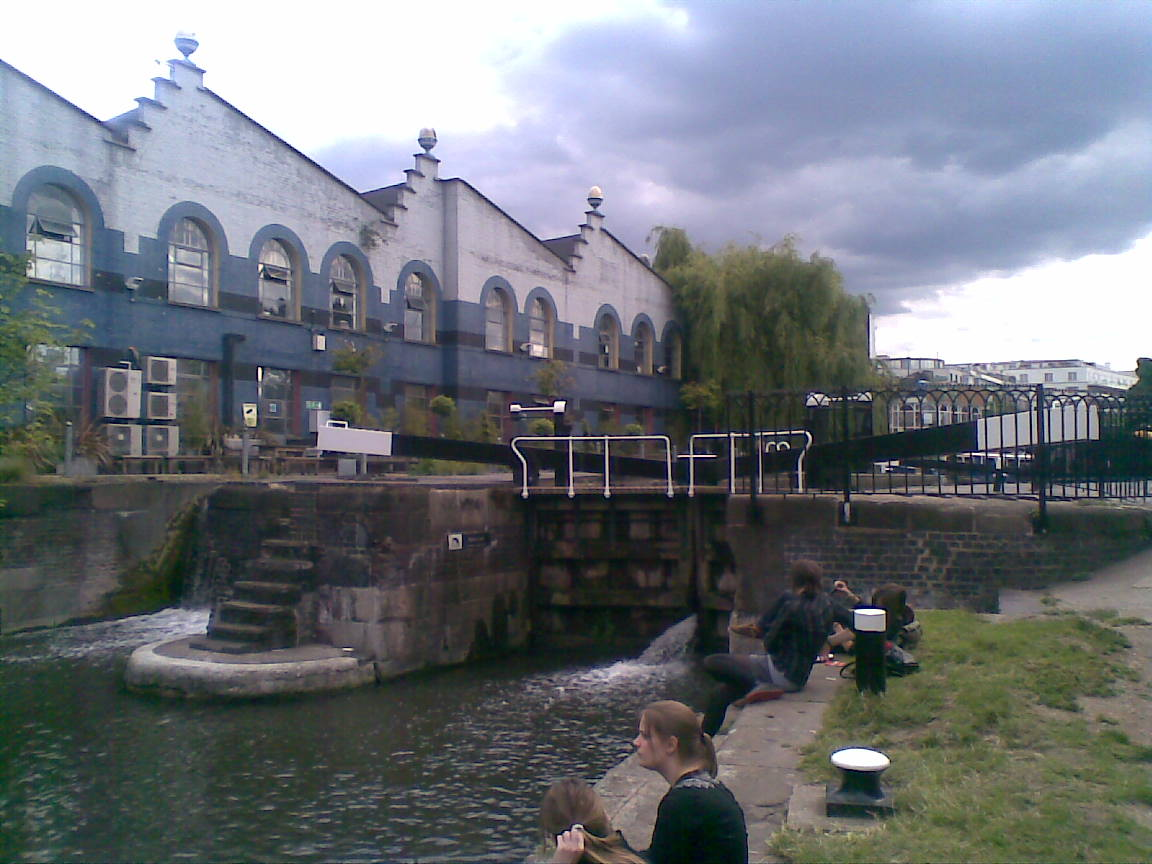
- Hawley Lock, 2008
- 51.541648°N 0.143938°W
- Waterway: Regent's Canal
- County: Camden; Greater London
- Maintained by: Canal & River Trust
- Fall: 8 feet (2.4 m)
- Distance to Limehouse Basin: 6.04 miles (9.7 km)
- Distance to Paddington Basin: 2.84 miles (4.6 km)

Hawley Lock is a lock on the Regent's Canal, in the London Borough of Camden. It is likely called after the Hawley family who were prominent in Brentford and Boston Manor from the late 1500s onward. The Hawleys held the lease on Brentford market for nearly 200 years.

The lock was opened in 1820 and was originally a pair of locks. One of the two locks was converted to a weir in the 1970s. A lock keepers cottage was built alongside the lock in 1820 by Francis Read who charged £204. Some time before 1850 the cottage was expanded and split into two. The cottages suffered bomb damage during world war 2 and appear to have been demolished by 1952.

The nearest London Underground station is Camden Town.

The nearest London Overground station is Camden Road.

== See also ==
- Canals of the United Kingdom
- History of the British canal system

Next lock upstream	Regent's Canal	Next lock downstream
Hampstead Road Locks; No. 1	Hawley Lock; Grid reference: TQ288841	Kentish Town Lock; No. 3
