= Transport on the Regent's Canal =

Regent's Canal
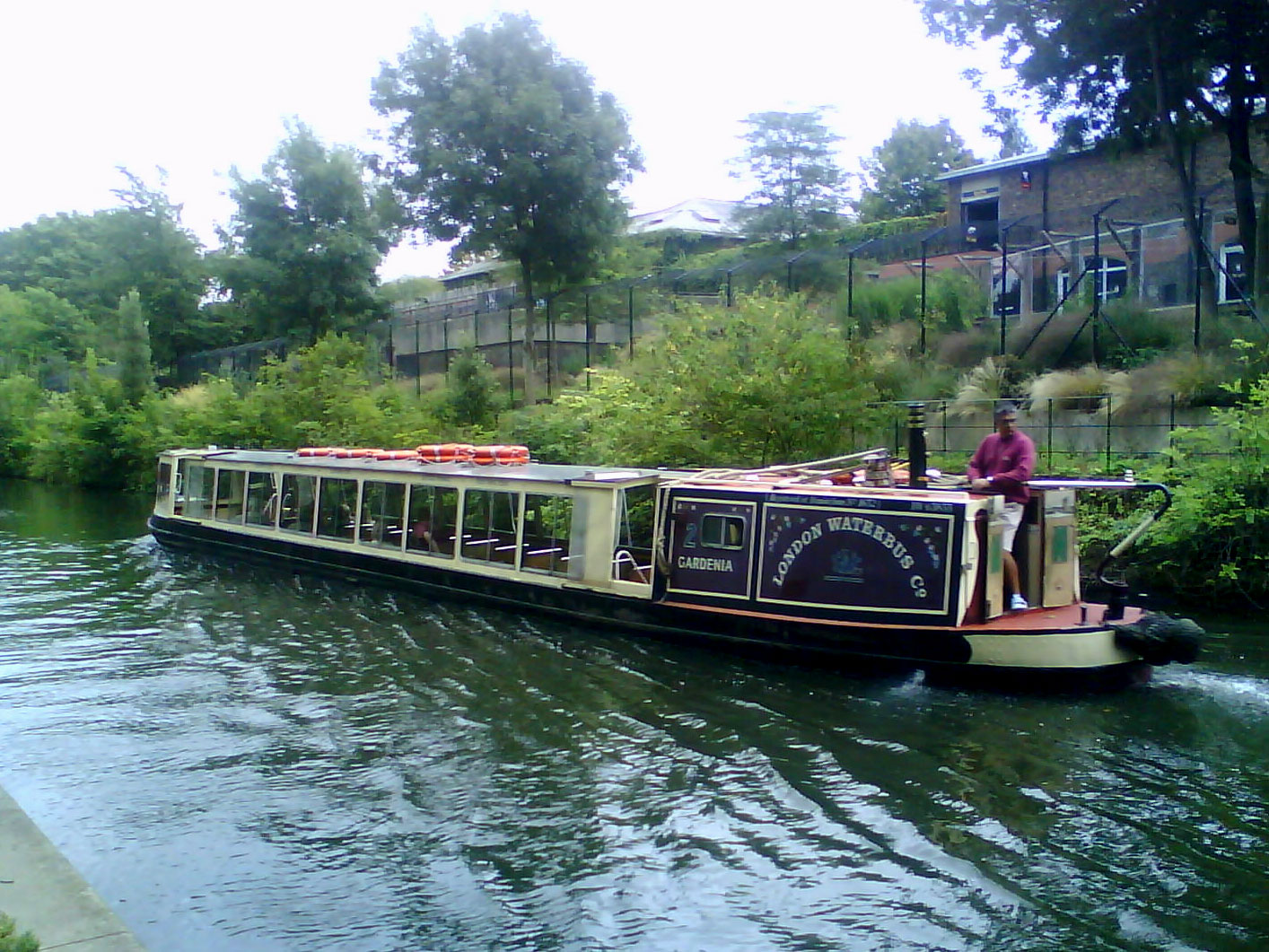
- Locale: London, England, UK
- Waterway: Regent's Canal
- Transit type: Waterbus services
- Operator: Jason's Canal Boat Trips; Walker's Quay; London Water bus Company
- No. of lines: 1
- No. of vessels: Narrowboats: Jason's - 1 Walker's Quay - 1 London Waterbus Co. - 4
- No. of terminals: 3

Several private boat companies operate services which provide Transport on the Regent's Canal. The services run along the Regent's Canal in London, England, UK, and are open to the public. They provide both leisure cruises and regular scheduled "water bus" services along the canal between Little Venice, London Zoo and Camden Lock.

== Operators ==
The boat companies running services include the London Waterbus Company, Walker's Quay and Jason's Trip. The companies are licensed to operate on the canal by the Canal and River Trust. The services are not part of the London public transport system whose tickets cannot be used on the canal.

== Vessels ==
The London Waterbus Company has a fleet of four traditional canal barges or narrowboats which have been converted to carry passengers as a water bus service. Two of the vessels are of historic interest and are noted on the National Register of Historic Ships.

Walker's Quay operate the Jenny Wren cruise boat, and also the widebeam restaurant boat, My Fair Lady.

Jason, run by Jason's Trip, is over 100 years old and is one of the oldest narrowboats in use on the Regent's Canal.

== Services ==
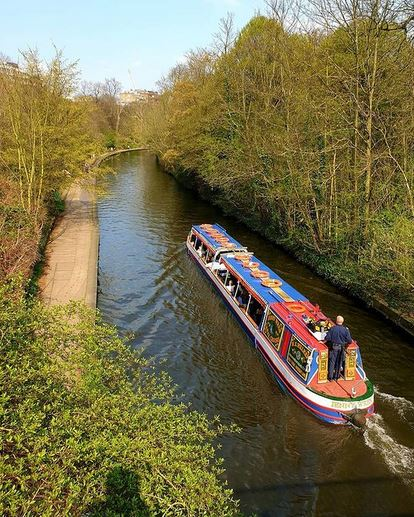
The Jenny Wren passing through Regent's Park

The London Waterbus Company runs daily scheduled water bus services all year round, with regular services running between Camden Lock and Little Venice, as well as Zoo Express services into London Zoo (including zoo admission). They have online ticketing with additional limited walk up availability for seats with card payments on board.

The narrowboat, known as the Jenny Wren has been operating since 1968 and follows a similar route, offering a scheduled pleasure cruise service from Camden Lock to Little Venice and back with a tour guide. Uniquely for scheduled cruises, she also goes through the lock at Camden Town (commonly known as Camden Lock but properly called Hampstead Road Lock) at the start and end of the cruise. During the winter months, the boat is available for private hire only. My Fair Lady can be booked as required. Tickets can be bought online or at the canal on the day, and both cash and card payments are accepted for the cruise.

Jason's Trip has operated public trips from Little Venice to Camden since 1951. Jason operates from the first weekend in April to the first weekend in November.

== Route ==
The water bus services run between "Little Venice" and Camden Town. The area known as "Little Venice" in Maida Vale, north-west London, at the junction of the Regent's Canal and the Grand Union Canal. This part of the canal was originally called Browning's Pool, after the English poet Robert Browning who lived here from 1862 to 1887, and who is believed to have coined the name "Little Venice".

From Little Venice, the canal passes under the ancient Roman Road of Watling Street (today the A5 road) through the 272 yards (249 m) Maida Hill tunnel, and then passes through St John's Wood, curving parallel to Prince Albert Road around the northern edge of Regent's Park. The London Zoo water bus stop lies on the zoo side of the canal and can only be accessed by London Zoo visitors (there is no access to Regent's Park without buying a zoo ticket).

At the Cumberland Turn, the junction with the former Cumberland Basin, the canal bends left past a floating Chinese restaurant. The service terminates at the Grade II listed Camden Lock, only twin lock remaining on the Canal. The locks were constructed in 1818–20 by James Morgan, and are located in the Camden Town area. Jason and The London Water Bus Company's cruises terminate or turn round above the locks, whereby Jenny Wren passes through them.

== See also ==
- London River Services
