= Kentish Town Lock =

Lock on the Regent's Canal, in the London Borough of Camden

Kentish Town Lock No. 3
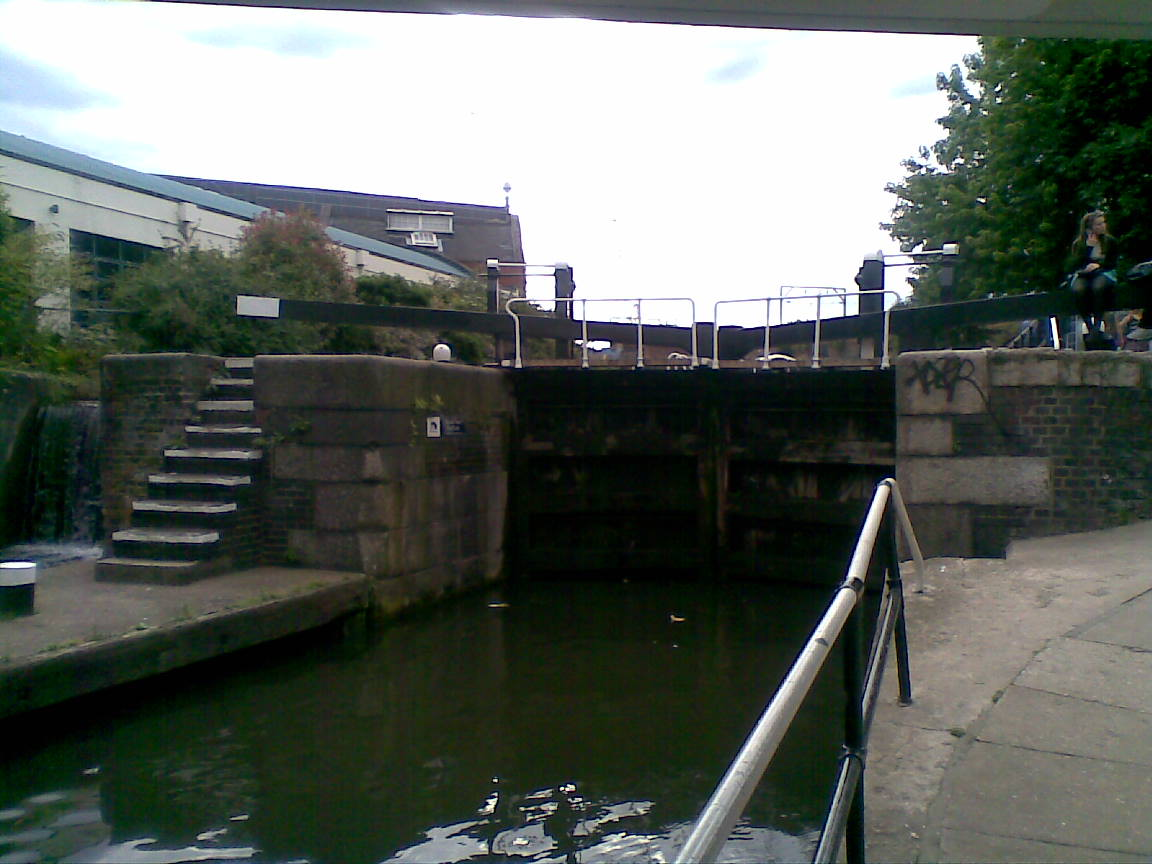
- Kentish Town Lock, 2008
- Interactive map of Kentish Town Lock No. 3
- 51.541511°N 0.142447°W
- Waterway: Regent's Canal
- County: Camden; Greater London
- Maintained by: Canal & River Trust
- Fall: 8 feet (2.4 m)
- Distance to Limehouse Basin: 6 miles (9.7 km)
- Distance to Paddington Basin: 2.9 miles (4.7 km)

Kentish Town Lock is a lock on the Regent's Canal in Kentish Town, in the London Borough of Camden.

The lock is situated in an area commonly referred to as Camden Lock. However as the Canal & River Trust which maintains the lock explains: "There isn't actually a Camden Lock. The name refers to an area of the market next to the three waterways with dual locks built in the 19th century as part of the Regent’s Canal – Hampstead Road Lock, Hawley Lock and Kentish Town Lock".

The canal, including this lock, was fully opened at 11 a.m on 1st August 1820. An area to the north of the lock was the site of a steam pumping station. Such a mechanism was used to move water back above the upper side of the lock to help maintain water levels along the length of the canal.

The site was originally a twin-lock construction, as still seen at Hampstead Road Lock. This permitted side-by-side operation and thus improved traffic flow. However in the 1970s one of the locks was replaced by a weir.

The nearest London Underground station is Camden Town on the Northern line.

The nearest London Overground station is Camden Road.

== See also ==
- Canals of the United Kingdom
- History of the British canal system

Next lock upstream	Regent's Canal	Next lock downstream
Hawley Lock; No. 2	Kentish Town Lock; Grid reference: TQ289841	St Pancras Lock; No. 4
