= St Pancras Coroner's Court =

Coroner's Court

Coordinates: 51.53612°N 0.13011°W

General information
- Location: London, England
- Address: Camley Street, St Pancras
- Country: United Kingdom

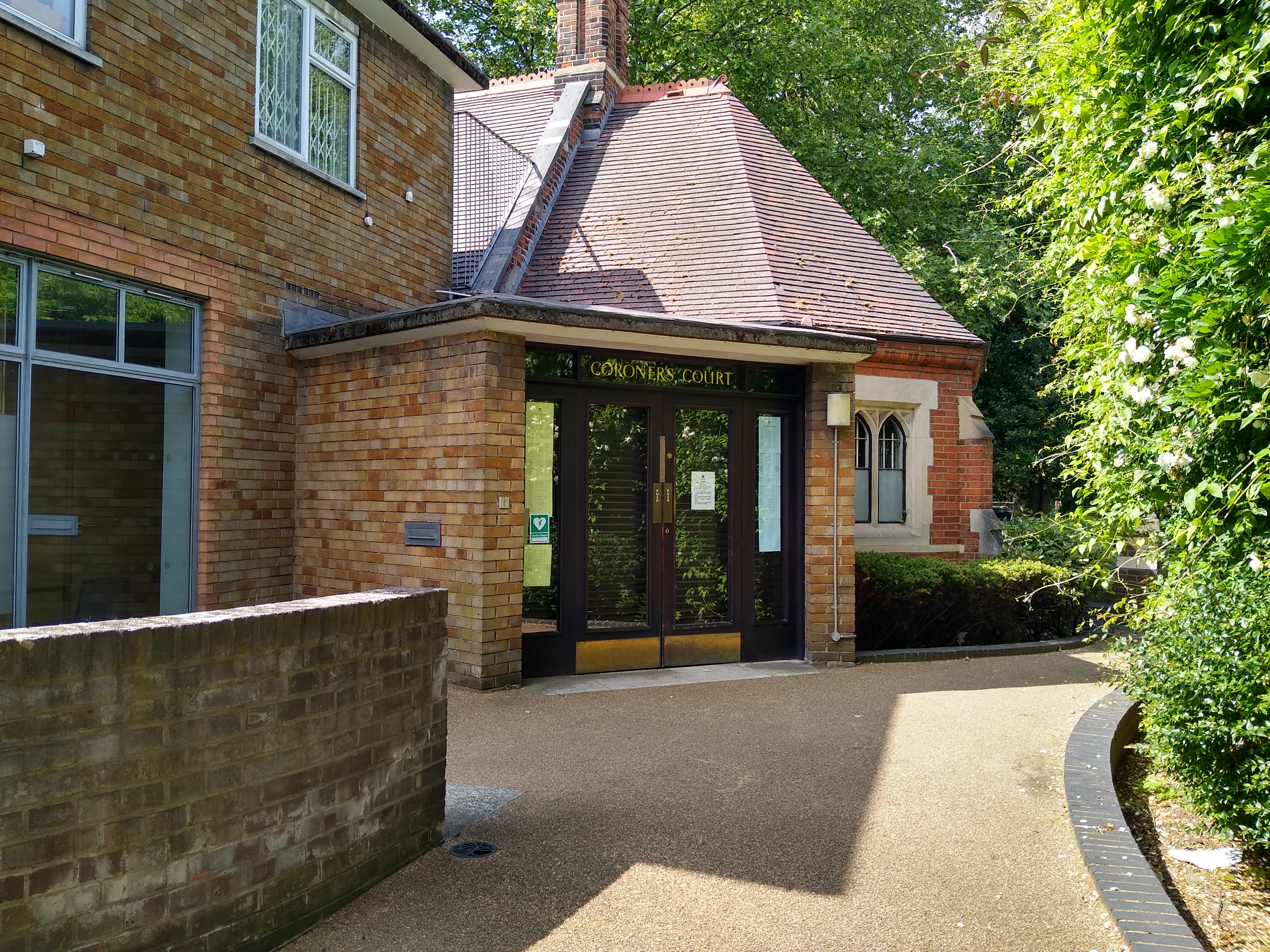
St Pancras Coroner's Court

St Pancras Coroner's Court is the Coroner's Court for inner north London. It is located at Camley Street, St Pancras, London. The court covers cases for the London boroughs of Camden, Islington, Hackney and Tower Hamlets.
