= St Pancras Lock =

Lock in London Borough of Camden, London, England

St Pancras Lock No. 4
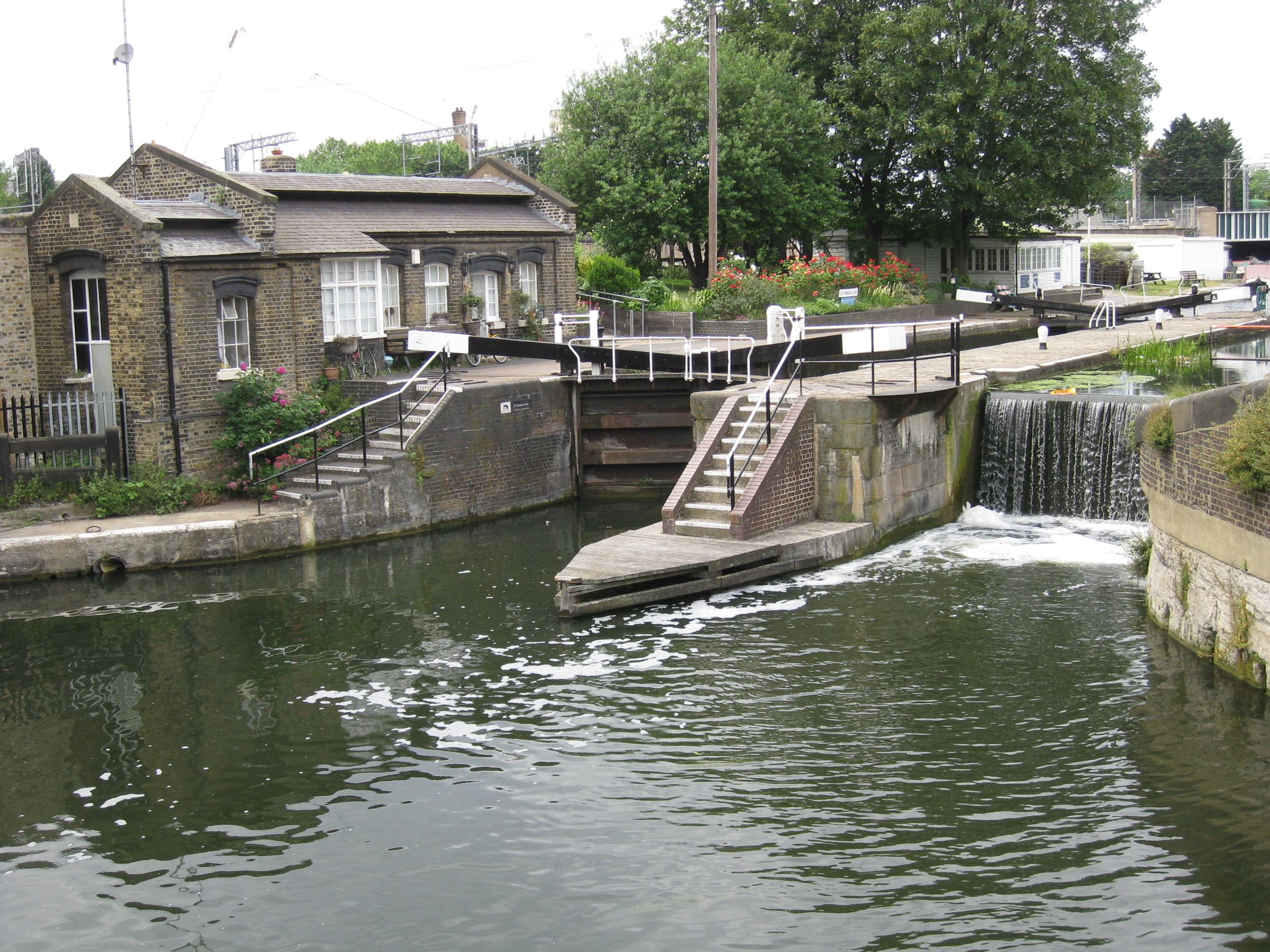
- St Pancras Lock, 2013
- 51.536186°N 0.127877°W
- Waterway: Regent's Canal
- County: Camden; Greater London
- Maintained by: Canal & River Trust
- First built: 1819
- Fall: 8 feet (2.4 m)
- Distance to Limehouse Basin: 4.4 miles (7.1 km)
- Distance to Paddington Basin: 3.5 miles (5.6 km)

St Pancras Lock is a lock on the Regent's Canal, in the London Borough of Camden, England. The St Pancras Basin is nearby.

== History ==
Regent's Canal was authorised by an act of parliament obtained on 13 July 1812, for a canal from Paddington to Limehouse. The directors had decided that all locks would be paired when they first met, but were then sidetracked by proposals to use hydro-pneumatic boat lifts. Operation of a trial lift built at Camden Town was problematic, and after a suggestion by Earl Stanhope in 1815 that they revert to single locks, the proprietors decided to follow their original decision, and so a pair of locks was built at St Pancras, and at the eleven other locations where locks were needed. After some delay caused by financial difficulties, building of the canal resumed in December 1817, and it was officially opened on 1 August 1820. St Pancras lock was built towards the end of the project, being completed in 1819. The use of paired locks was partly to save water, as water could be transferred between the locks, rather than all of it being discharged into the lower pound when a lock was emptied. This made operation of the locks more complex, and so they were permanently manned during the heyday of the canal, with lock-keepers working a shift system to provide 24-hour cover. As the use of the canal declined, in part due to railway competition, manning levels were reduced, and padlocks were used to prevent operation of the locks at the weekends. Following the end of commercial traffic and the growth of leisure boating, the locks reverted to operation by boat crews, and in order to prevent flooding caused by incorrect operation of the paddles, in the 1980s the gates were removed from the northernmost lock, and a weir and spillway were constructed at the lower end.

Below the lock, the canal turns through a right-angled bend and is carried over the railway lines into Kings Cross station by an iron aqueduct. In 1939, stop locks were installed at both ends of the aqueduct, to limit damage to the railway in the event of damage to the structure by bombing.

== Geography ==
The canal at this point travels in a north-west to south-east direction, with the level dropping through the locks. To reach the lock, the canal passes under the railway lines to St Pancras railway station, and just beyond the bridge is the entrance to St Pancras Basin, which lies to the west of the lock, and provides a convenient winding hole for boats. By the south-west corner of the lock is a Grade II Listed single storey lock keeper's cottage, built in yellow bricks with a gabled slate roof. It was originally built as a pumping station, and was designed by Sir John Wolfe Barry in 1898, but became a residence for the lock keeper in 1926. Bordering the south-western bank of the canal as it continues to the south-east is the Camley Street Natural Park, a 2.1-acre (0.83 ha) local nature reserve opened in 1985 on the site of a former coal drop for King's Cross station. The towpath is on the north-eastern side of the canal, and forms part of section 3 of the Jubilee Greenway, a network of paths totalling 37 miles (60 km) which was completed in 2012 to link the venues of the 2012 Summer Olympics to parks, waterways and other attractions.

The next lock upstream is Kentish Town Lock No. 3, 0.7 miles (1.1 km) to the west, and the next lock downstream is City Road Lock No. 5, 1.0 mile (1.6 km) to the east. The nearest London Underground station is King's Cross St Pancras. There are also National Rail stations at King's Cross and St Pancras.

== See also ==
- Canals of the United Kingdom
- History of the British canal system

Next lock upstream	Regent's Canal	Next lock downstream
Kentish Town Lock; No. 3	St Pancras Lock; Grid reference: TQ299835	City Road Lock; No. 5

== Bibliography ==
- Camden (January 2001). "Regents Canal Conservation Area Statement". Camden Council.
- Cumberlidge, Jane (2009). Inland Waterways of Great Britain (8th Ed.). Imray Laurie Norie and Wilson. ISBN 978-1-84623-010-3.
- Hadfield, Charles (1970). The Canals of the East Midlands. David and Charles. ISBN 978-0-7153-4871-0.
- Nicholson (2006). Nicholson Guides Vol 1: Grand Union, Oxford & the South East. Harper Collins. ISBN 978-0-00-721109-8.
