= St George's Church, Wolverhampton =

St George’s Church, Wolverhampton
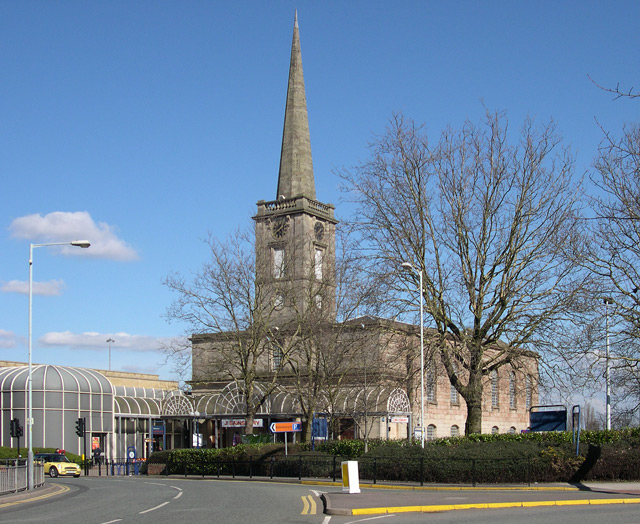
- St George’s Church, Wolverhampton
- St George’s Church, Wolverhampton
- 52°34′58.62″N 2°7′23.17″W
- OS grid reference: SO 91770 98358
- Location: Wolverhampton
- Country: England
- Denomination: Church of England

History
- Dedication: St George

Architecture
- Architect: James Morgan
- Groundbreaking: 1828
- Completed: 1830
- Construction cost: £10,268
- Closed: 1978

Specifications
- Capacity: 2038 persons
- Length: 127 feet (39 m)
- Width: 67 feet (20 m)

St George's Church, Wolverhampton is a Grade II listed former parish church in the Church of England in Wolverhampton

== History ==
The church was built between 1828 and 1830 by James Morgan at a cost of £10,268 (equivalent to £1,014,025 in 2025). It was consecrated on Thursday 2 September 1830 by the Bishop of Lichfield. It was described in the Staffordshire Advertiser as

St George’s Church is of the Grecian style of architecture and of the Doric order; it has a tower and spire, and built of brick, cased with Tixall stone; and the window frames are of iron. The exterior of the edifice is plain, and almost devoid of ornament. Its interior appearance is light, and it will be much improved when completely painted and properly furnished. It is exceedingly commodious, and well adapted for the purpose to which it will be appropriated - its length is 127 feet, and its width 67 feet. There are doors on each side of the principal entrance, which admit both into the galleries and the body of the church. The galleries, which are erected on each side and at the west end, are, as well as the loft nave, supported by iron pillars; the galleries for the children of the charity schools are in recesses on each side of the space which is intended for the organ. The building will accommodate 2038 persons, 706 sittings being in pews, 1332 in free seats for the use of the poor - the free seats are in the middle aisle and on the back parts both of the galleries and the body of the church. The vestry and robing room are at the east end, on each side of the altar; over the altar is an appropriately designed and well executed painted window, by Henderson of Birmingham, which cost 100l. and was raised by subscription. The estimated expense of the structure was 10,325l. 3s. 6d. of which amount 3,300l. was contributed by the subscription of the inhabitants, and the remainder was found by the Parliamentary Commissioners.

It was made redundant in 1978 and became a Sainsbury's Supermarket in 1986. In 2015, Sainsbury's moved to a new store off Ring Road St Mark's.

== Organ ==
The church had a pipe organ by F.H. Browne of Deal, Kent, dating from 1897. A specification of the organ can be found on the National Pipe Organ Register.
