= Camley Street Natural Park =

Urban nature reserve in King's Cross in central London

- IUCN category IV (habitat/species management area)
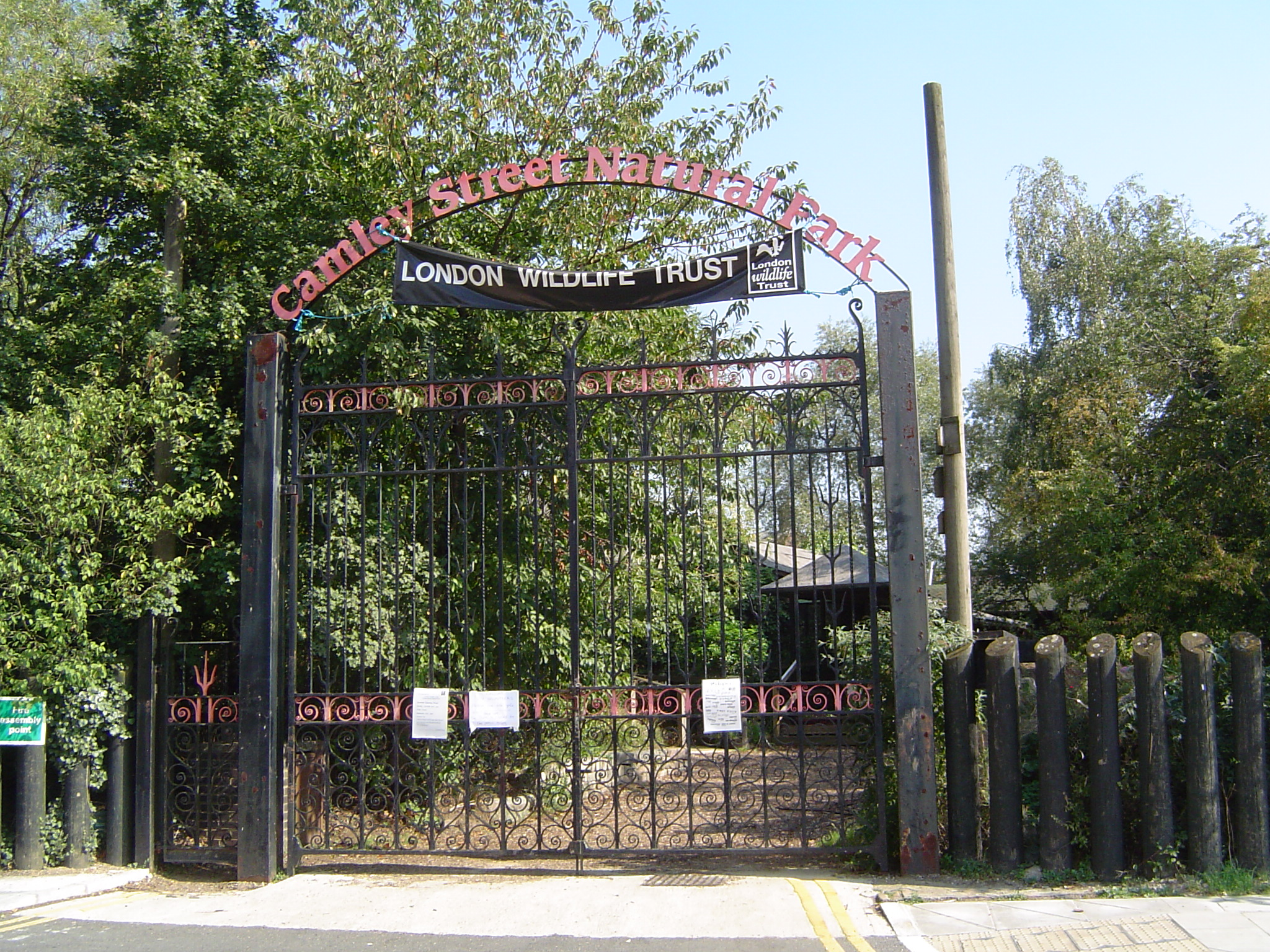
- Interactive map of Camley Street Natural Park
- Location: St Pancras
- Nearest city: London, England
- Coordinates: 51°32′8.08″N 0°7′41.3″W
- Area: 0.8 ha (2.0 acres)
- Governing body: London Wildlife Trust
- Website: www.wildlondon.org.uk/reserves/camley-street-natural-park

Camley Street Natural Park is an urban nature reserve in St Pancras in central London and within the London Borough of Camden. It is a local nature reserve.

The park was closed to the public for reconstruction in December 2017 and reopened in September 2021.

== Description ==
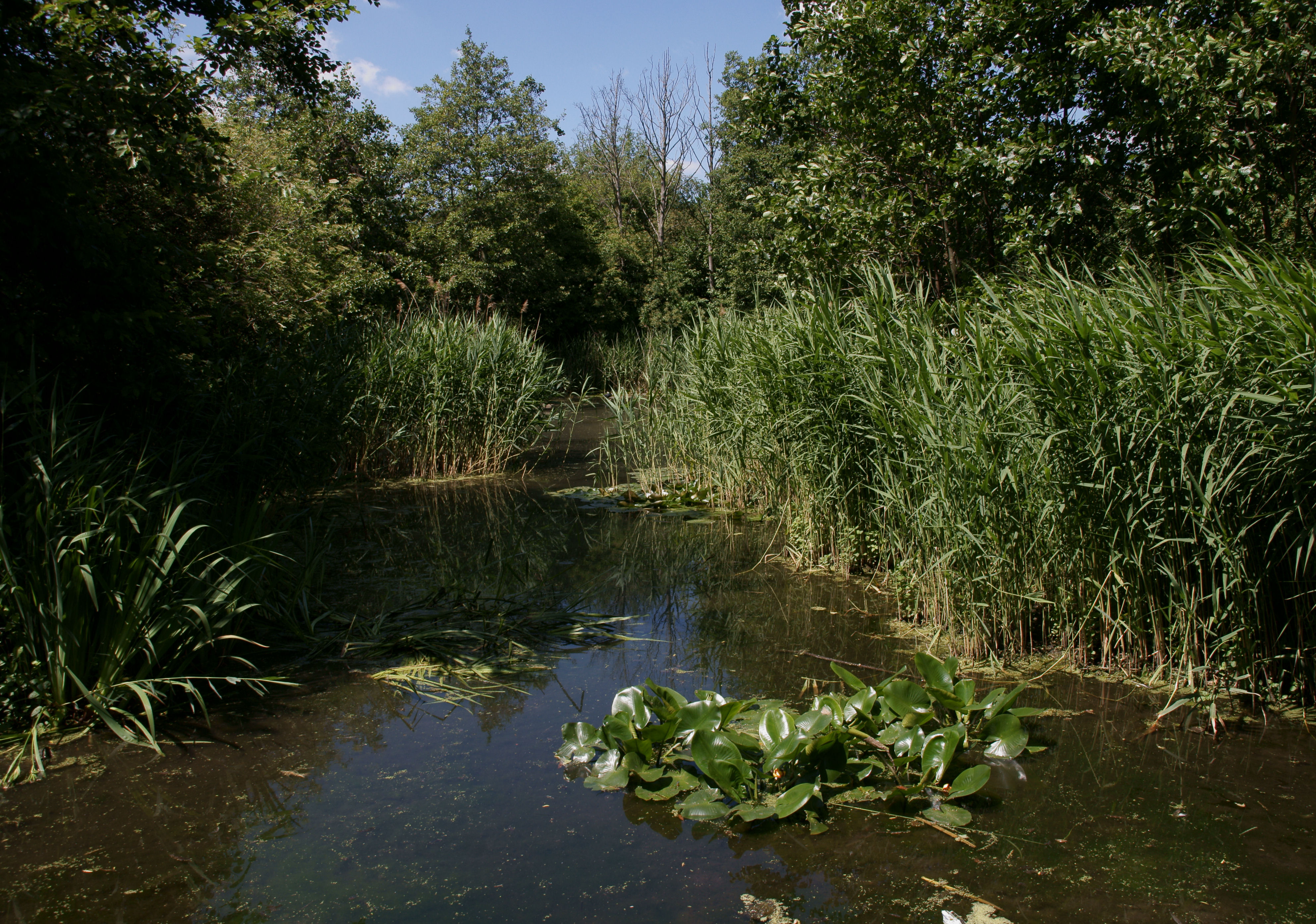
A pond in Camley Street Natural Park

Comprising 0.8 hectares (2 acres) of land on the banks of the Regent's Canal – by St Pancras Lock and adjoining St Pancras Basin, the park is both a sanctuary for wildlife and an educational centre, forming what Time Out called "a lovely oasis".

It is run by the London Wildlife Trust. A visitors' centre caters for casual visitors and school parties, though tours must be booked.

In shape the park is a narrow strip of land bounded by the canal, Camley Street and Goods Way. The entrance is through an ornate gate on Camley Street.

Admission to the park is free. It is open daily.

== Ecology ==
A variety of habitats co-exist in the park's small environs, including wetlands, meadow and woodland, which attract insects, amphibians, birds, and at least six species of mammal.

Over 300 higher plants have been found at the site; highlights include common broomrape (Orobanche minor), hairy buttercup (Ranunculus sardous) and common spotted orchid (Dactylorhiza fuchsii).

The site is divided into the following habitats:

- A summer-flowering meadow,
- A pond with varying water level, dependent on the canal water level,
- Marshland with reed bed,
- Coppiced woodland,
- Deciduous woodland,
- Mixed woodland with scrub,
- Mixed woodland with hedgerow,
- Dipping pond (with boardwalk),
- Rainwater ponds.

Meadow herbs include white clover and poppy.

Woodland trees include hazel, rowan, hawthorn and silver birch. Hazel and willow are coppiced regularly. Woodland herbs include lesser celandine and wild violet.

Marshland herbs include marsh marigold, greater pond sedge, pendulous sedge, reed, bogbean, mallow and yellow iris. Marsh-nesting birds include reed bunting, moorhen, coot and reed warbler.

== History ==
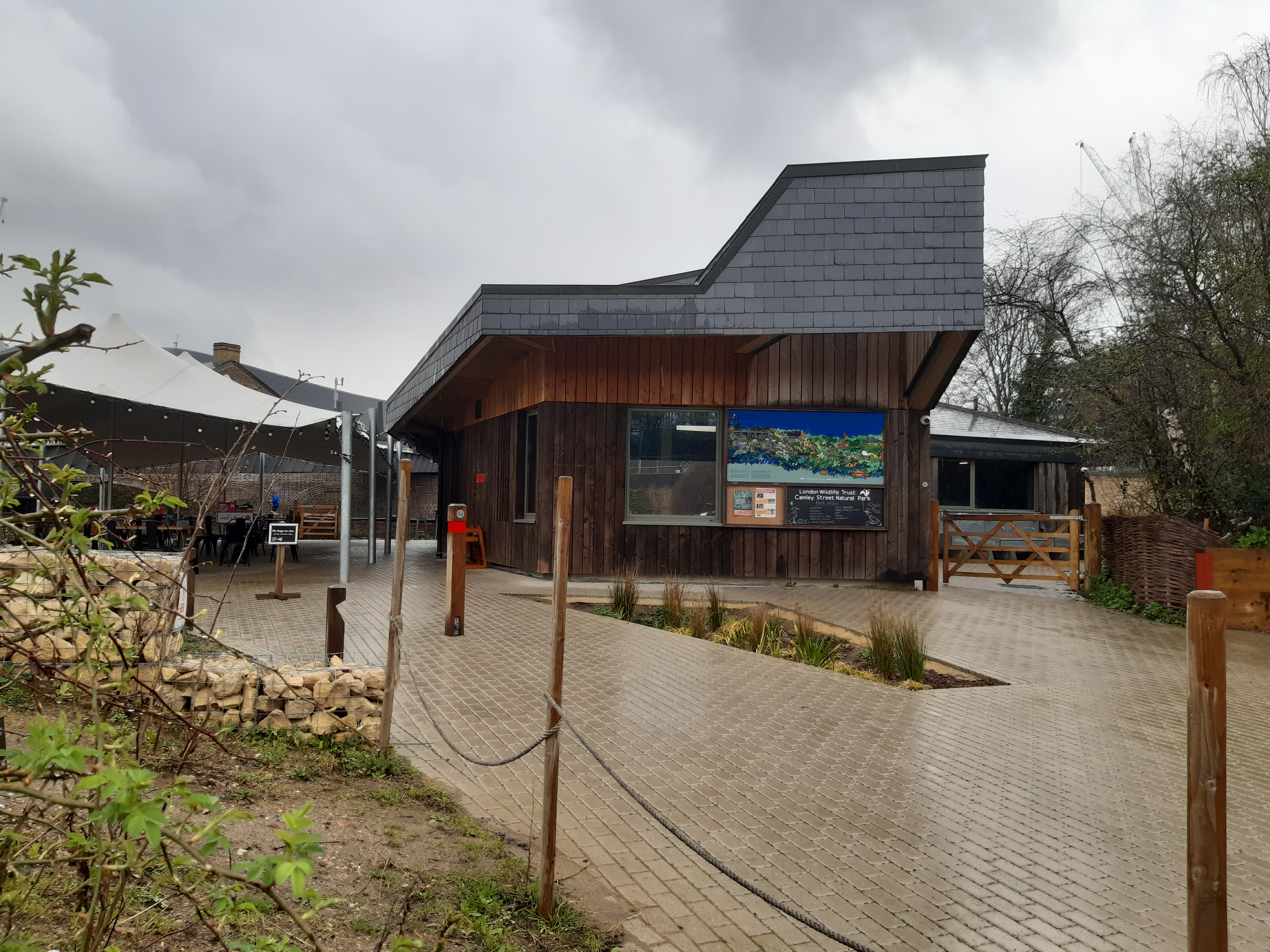
The rebuilt Camley Street Visitor Centre in 2023

Until the 17th century the area was in the Middlesex woodlands. In the 18th century it came under industrial use, and the Regent's Canal was built along the eastern edge of the former country estate. In the 19th century the area was used for coal chutes, first for the canal and then for the Midland Railway. Camley Street was originally known as Cambridge Street, until renamed by the LCC. The site became derelict by the 1970s.

In 1984, Camden Borough Council assigned the nascent London Wildlife Trust to manage the site. The park opened in 1985.

In 2008, King's Cross Central started to plan a major development to the east and south of the park, with a footbridge across the Regent's Canal into the park.

In 2017 the Somers Town bridge over the Regents Park canal opened connecting Camley Street and the new Gasholder Gardens. The new café and learning centre opened in 2022.

== Activities ==
The park hosts pond dipping and wildlife watching sessions for children. Its visitor centre is used by the Wildlife Watch Club.

== Value ==
According to the Mayor of London's Biodiversity Strategy, "Camley Street Natural Park, in particular, has demonstrated that a valuable wildlife space can be created from nothing to become a hub of communal and educational activity, supporting wildlife such as the reed warbler in a place where this would otherwise be unthinkable. Visitors from far and wide come to learn from this example."

== See also ==
- Camden parks and open spaces
