= St Pancras Basin =

Coordinates: 51.5367°N 0.1286°W

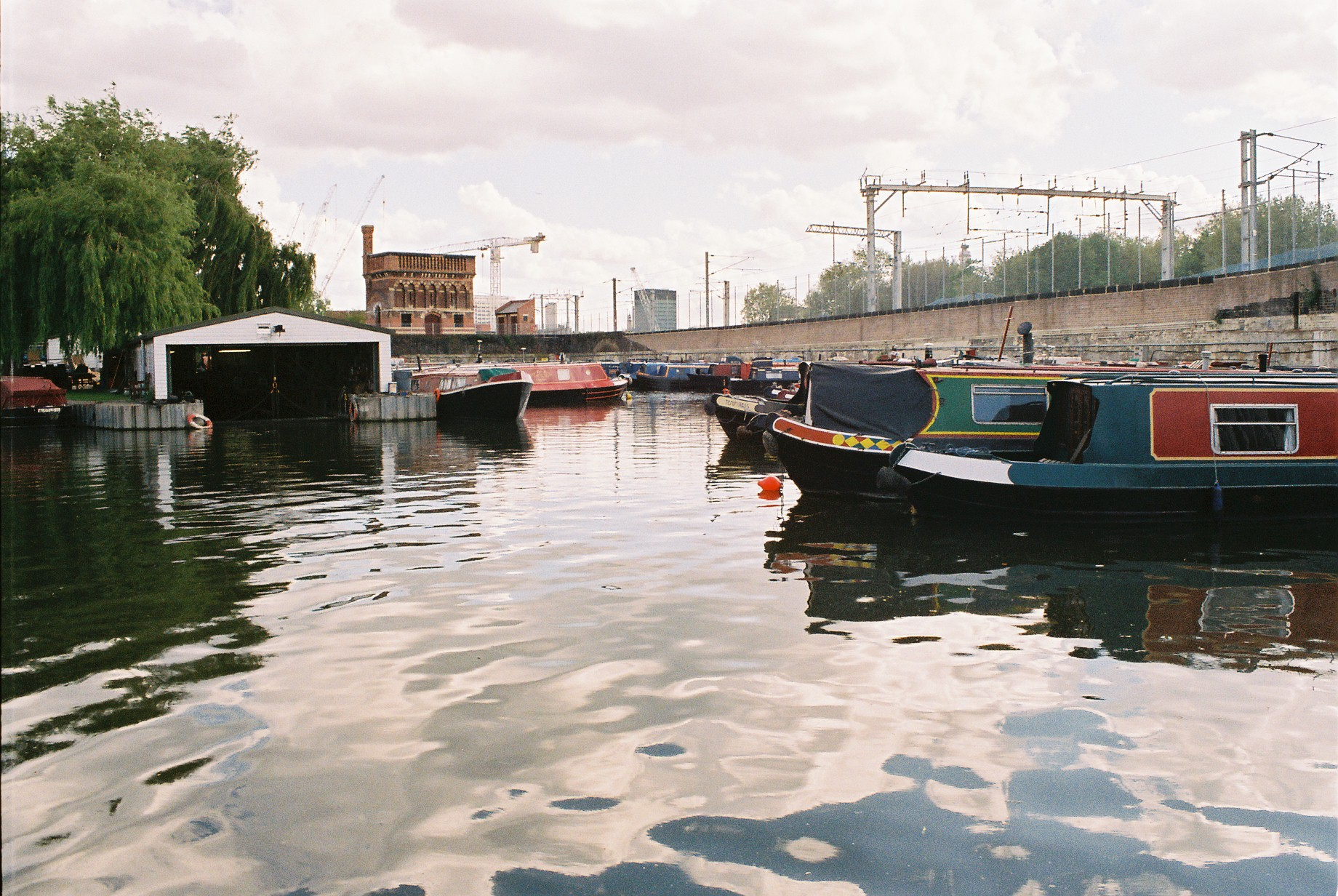
The basin, looking towards the south, with the moved Waterpoint building in the centre

The St Pancras Basin, also known as St Pancras Yacht Basin, is part of the Regent's Canal in the London Borough of Camden, England, slightly to the west of St Pancras Lock. Formerly known as the Midland Railway Basin,

The Basin was built by the Midland Railway in 1869 to load canal barges with coal brought by the railway, mainly from Derbyshire and Nottinghamshire. It fell into disuse after the coal drops were dismantled. The canal basin is owned by Canal & River Trust, and since 1958 has been home to the St Pancras Cruising Club.

== Locality ==
Overlooking the basin is Gasholder No. 8, a structure which was erected in 1883 but using a tank dating from the 1850s. The frame which holds the tank was the last to be built using the designs of John Clark. Construction was managed by C F Clegg, with the ironwork being manufactured by Westwood and Wright. It originally formed part of Pancras Gasworks, the largest such installation in Britain in the 1860s, and was located some 440 yards (400 m) to the south of its present location. Ownership of the gasworks passed to the Gas Light and Coke Company in 1876, and production of town gas was discontinued in the early twentieth century. It became a Grade II Listed structure in 1986, and continued in use as a gasholder until the 1990s. It was dismantled as part of the reconstruction of St Pancras railway station, and rebuilt on the north bank of the canal in 2014. The gasholder frame has 16 hollow cast iron columns, each 80 feet (24 m) high, which are linked together by two levels of wrought iron lattice girders. A park has been created within the frame, which is connected to the canal towpath by footpaths.l.

Gasholders 10, 11 and 12 were also moved and re-erected close to the canal. They date from 1860 to 1867, and were enlarged in 1879/80, when the frames were interconnected, resulting in them having a common spine. The hollow cast iron columns are linked together by three tiers of lattice girders, constructed of wrought iron. The frames were refurbished by a specialist iron-work company in Yorkshire before they were re-assembled, and each surrounds a circular apartment block, with a roof garden. The scheme was designed by the architects WilkinsonEyre.

A Grade II Listed watertower, designed by Sir George Gilbert Scott, the architect who built St Pancras station, and built around 1870, has also been moved to a new site overlooking the basin. It was built in Gothic Revival style, and use of this style for a functional building was criticised at the time. The structure was largely built of brick, and includes a water tank capable of holding 13,800 imperial gallons (63,000 L) of water, used to supply steam locomotives on the Midland Railway. It was moved from a site some 660 yards (600 m) further to the south in late 2001, to prevent it being demolished by the construction of the Channel Tunnel rail link. Because of the hardness of the mortar compared to the strength of the bricks, it was not possible to dismantle the building and rebuild it. Instead, it was sliced into three sections, by sawing horizontally through two sets of bedding joints. A reinforced concrete ring beam was cast at each of the joints, and the upper two sections, containing the water tank and the first floor with its feature arches, were removed by crane for transport to the new site. The bottom section, which consisted of a plain plinth, could not be moved, as it was already badly damaged, and formed part of the adjoining viaduct wall. New foundations were constructed, and a replacement plinth was built, using bricks sourced from Leicestershire, close to where the original bricks were manufactured. To comply with the Channel Tunnel rail link construction schedule, work could not begin before 2 July 2001, and the original site had to be vacated by 31 December 2001. The replacement plinth was built with an inner core, onto which the middle and upper sections were lowered by crane. An outer skin of brickwork was then constructed, to ensure that the finished surfaces were in line with the storeys above. Moving of the 140-tonne sections took place over three days in November 2001, and the building, which is known as St Pancras Waterpoint, will initially be used as a viewing tower. Development plans include its subsequent use for educational and recreational activities.

== See also ==
- Canals of the United Kingdom
- History of the British canal system
- List of canal basins in the United Kingdom
