= Belsize Wood =

Nature reserve in the London Borough of Camden, England

Coordinates: 51.552°N 0.1625°W

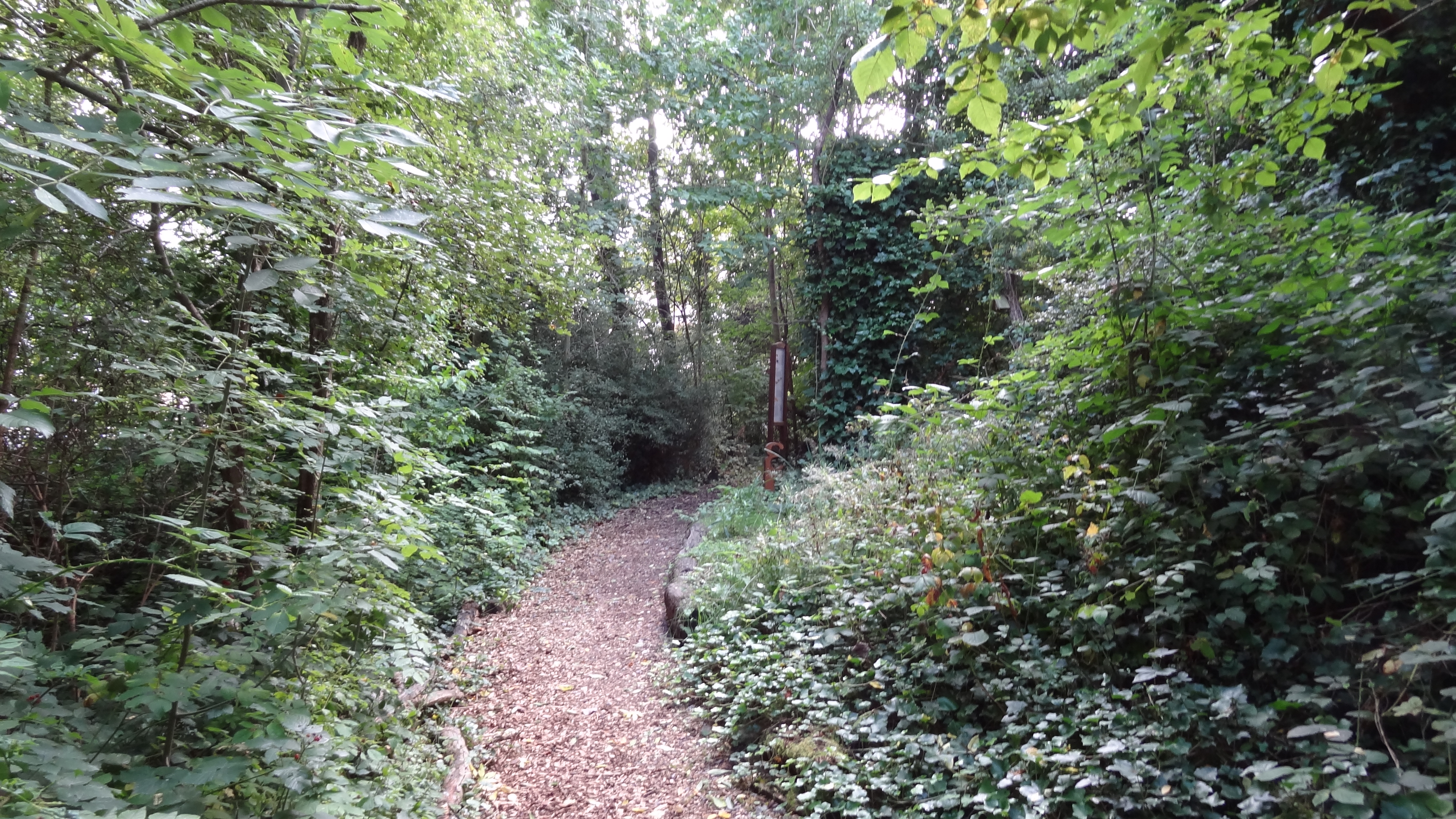
Path in the southern end of Belsize Wood

Belsize Wood is a 0.7 hectare Local Nature Reserve and a Site of Borough Importance for Nature Conservation, Grade II, in Belsize Park in the London Borough of Camden. It is a steeply sloping site divided into a northern half, which is always open to the public and is of lesser ecological value, and a southern part which is in a better state of conservation, and which is only open at weekends. The two halves are separated by a public footpath between Lawn Road and Aspern Grove. The site is owned and managed by Camden Council.

== History ==
A railway tunnel runs under the site, built by the Midland Railway Company, which owned the site in the 1860s, and there is a railway ventilation shaft in the north west corner. From 1948 British Railways leased the land for various uses, including tennis courts and nursery gardens. In 1971 Camden Council acquired the land, and in the 1980s built the Russell Nurseries housing estate on the western part, leaving the eastern part undeveloped to become the nature reserve. The Grade I listed 1934 modernist Isokon Flats is adjacent to the site in Lawn Road. In 1938, the modernist landscape architect Christopher Tunnard developed the part closest to the building into a path and added plants.

== Wildlife ==
The site is deeply shaded and has a rich variety of species, especially of insects. The understorey is dominated hawthorn and elder, and the most common canopy trees are ash, sycamore and Swedish whitebeam. Ground level plants include butcher's-broom, enchanter's-nightshade and nettles. A number of common birds nest there.

== See also ==
- List of Sites of Special Scientific Interest in Greater London
