= St Pancras Cruising Club =

Coordinates: 51.53634°N 0.12820°W

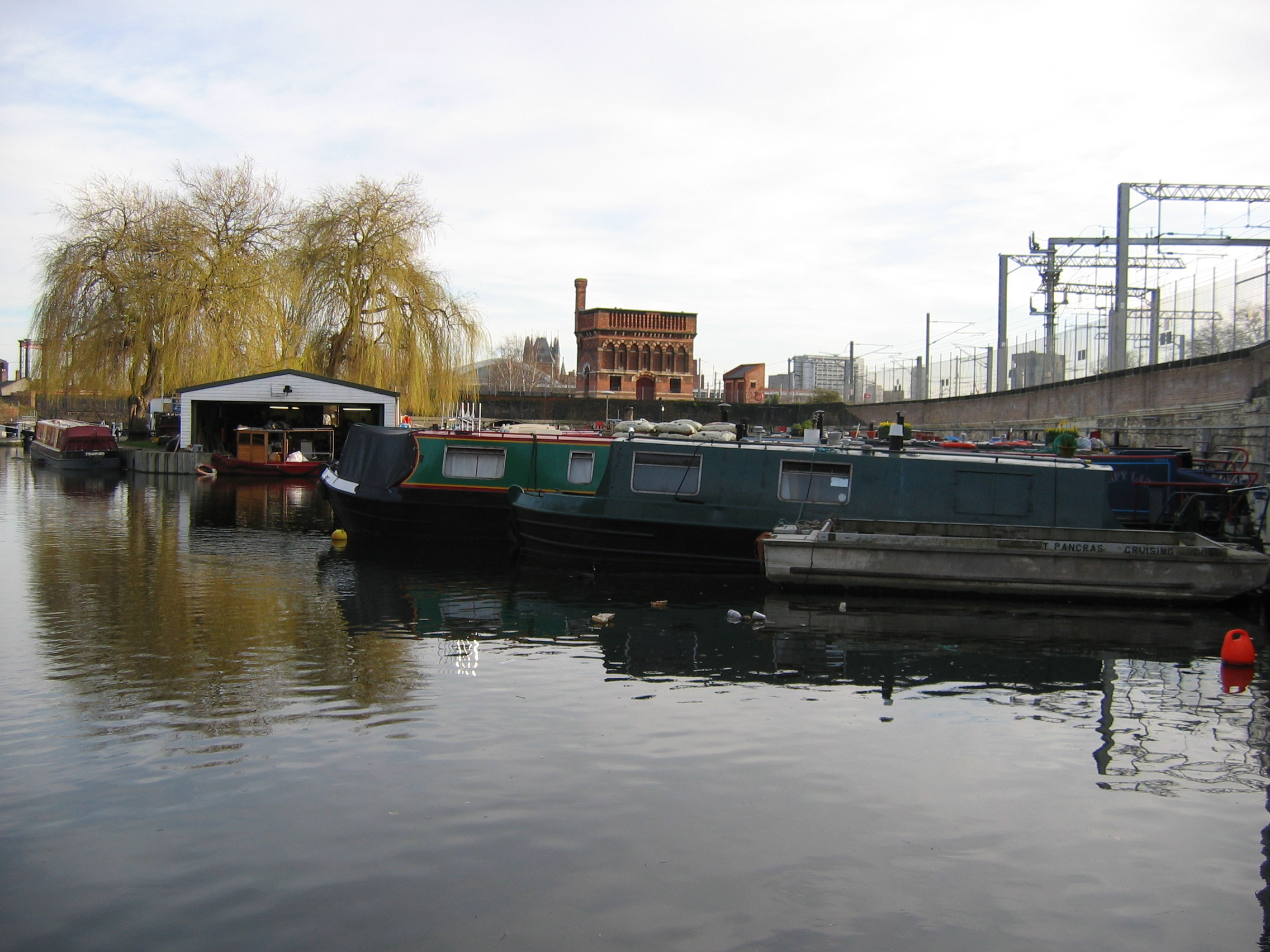
St Pancras Cruising Club

St Pancras Cruising Club is a members’ club based in London Borough of Camden that exists to promote pleasure cruising on UK inland waterways and to provide facilities for its members and others. Most Club members own boats but the Club also welcomes anyone who is interested in boating and inland waterways.

The Club provides non-residential moorings for around 60 boats.

== Location and facilities ==
The Club based at the basin of the same name, next to Camley Street Natural Park, between St Pancras Station and St Pancras Old Church, one of the oldest church buildings in London, hence the name of the district. The club, which was founded in 1958, is situated in a canal basin that was used to handle coal.

SPCC has a clubhouse with a members bar. It constructed the first new dry dock in London for many decades, the only one in Central London.

In 2001 the club became the guardian of the St Pancras Waterpoint, a listed water tower originally used to refill the steam locomotives with water. The Victorian Gothic brick structure, designed by the office of Sir George Gilbert Scott around 1870, was moved a few hundred metres as it was in the way of the St Pancras International station enlargement. The club organises a number of open days during the summer when visitors can visit the water tower.

== Activities ==
SPCC has gained a reputation as one of the country's foremost cruising clubs, based not least on the year-round safe navigations that it conducts and marshals on the Tideway, the tidal Thames. Notable cruises include the 2007 one to the Houses of Parliament protesting DEFRA cuts to the inland waterways budget and the 'Fund Britain's Waterways' campaign cruise to Westminster in May 2024 protesting at proposed cut to waterways funding.. It was also a pivotal organiser in the narrowboat contribution to the Thames Diamond Jubilee Pageant in 2012.

SPCC has always played an active part in waterways events. It is a founder member of the Association of Waterways Cruising Clubs, The club helps organise events such as the Angel Canal Festival and the Inland Waterways Association Canalway Cavalcade at which the boat handling competition novice winner's trophy is named after a former commodore of SPCC, Dr Roger Squires.

== See also ==
- Canals of the United Kingdom
- History of the British canal system
