= James Morgan (engineer) =

British architect and engineer (died 1856)

James Morgan (1776? – 18 February 1856) was a British architect and engineer, notably associated with the construction of the Regent's Canal in London.

He is thought to have been born in Carmarthen, south Wales, where he became employed by noted architect and planner John Nash – an association which was to last some 40 years. As a master-planner, Nash often left the completion of projects to his assistants and Morgan was no exception. His 1811 masterplan for Regent's Park and the surrounding areas, for example, saw Morgan gainfully employed in supervising much of the park's layout.

That same year, Nash was approached by Thomas Homer to join a venture to construct a canal across north central London. Morgan, again, became responsible for the project's details, his plans formed the basis for the Regent's Canal Act passed by Parliament in 1812 and he was subsequently appointed the company’s engineer.

Although not a civil engineer of anything like the stature of contemporaries such as Thomas Telford, Morgan rose to the challenge of designing and supervising bridges, tunnels, basins and docks. Perhaps his most notable achievements were the Maida Hill and Islington tunnels – the latter was the longest on the canal, and when Telford himself was invited to inspect it in 1818, he opined: "materials and workmanship excellent, and its direction perfectly straight". The tunnel opened in 1820 and Morgan retained his role with the company for a further 15 years.

Morgan's other projects included: proposals (never realised) to canalise a stretch of the River Stour to Canterbury in Kent, a terrace of houses in Leamington Spa (with Nash) in 1827, St George's Church, Wolverhampton (1828-1830), and alterations to Bushbury Church, to the north of Wolverhampton (also 1830).

He died in London, and is buried in Brompton Cemetery.
