= Regent's Canal =

Canal in England

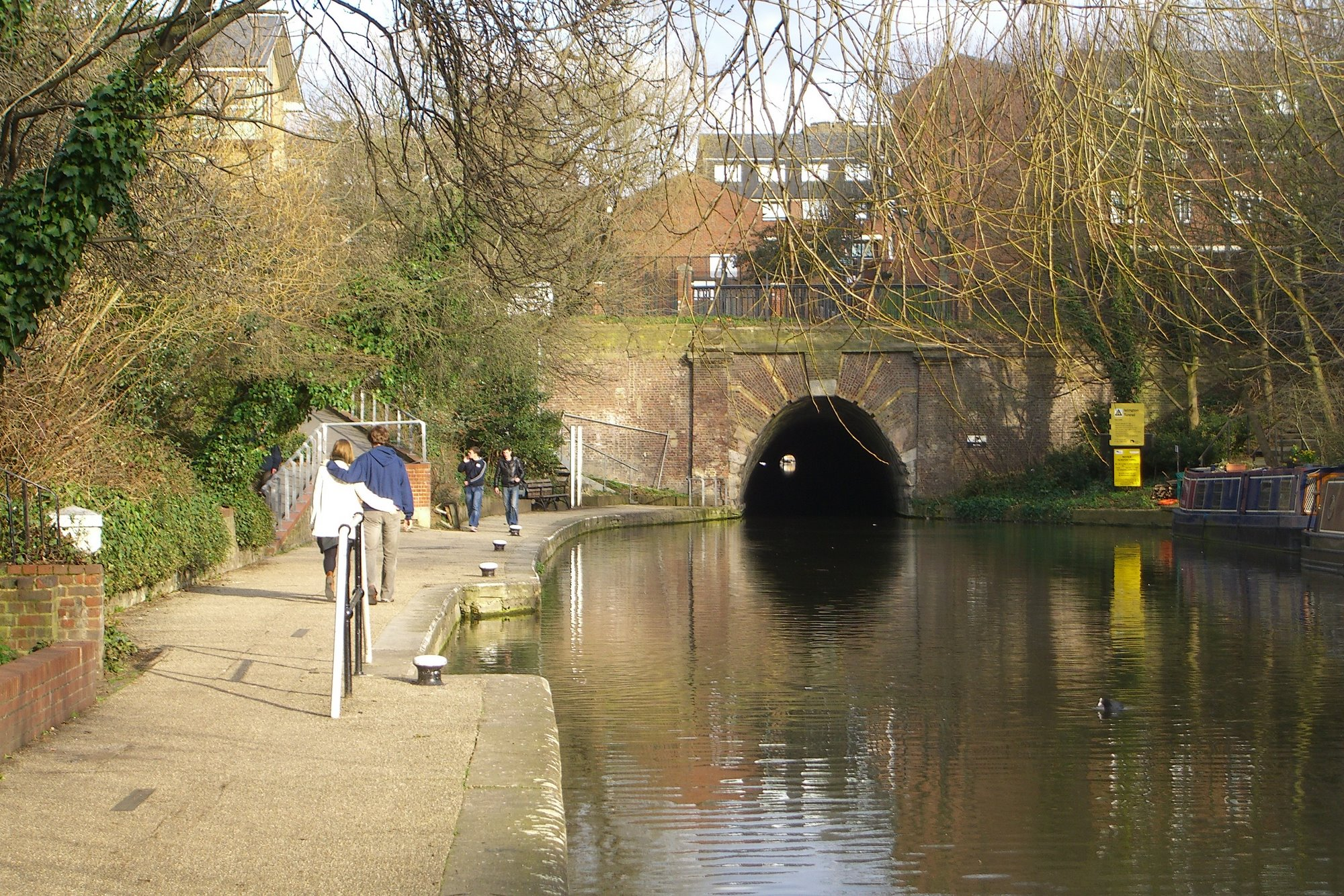
- West portal of the Islington tunnel
- Interactive map of Regent's Canal

Specifications
- Length: 8.6 miles (13.8 km)
- Maximum boat length: 78 ft 0 in (23.77 m)
- Maximum boat beam: 14 ft 6 in (4.42 m)
- Locks: 13
- Status: Open
- Navigation authority: Canal and River Trust

History
- Principal engineer: James Morgan
- Date of act: 13 July 1812
- Construction began: 14 October 1812
- Date of first use: 1816; 210 years ago
- Date completed: 1 August 1820

Geography
- Start point: Paddington Arm (Grand Union Canal)
- End point: River Thames (Limehouse)
- Branches: Hertford Union Canal; Limehouse Cut

Regent's Canal is a canal across an area just north of central London, England. It provides a link from the Paddington Arm of the Grand Union Canal, 550 yards (500 m) north-west of Paddington Basin in the west, to the Limehouse Basin and the River Thames in east London. The canal is 8.6 miles (13.8 km) long.

== Geography ==
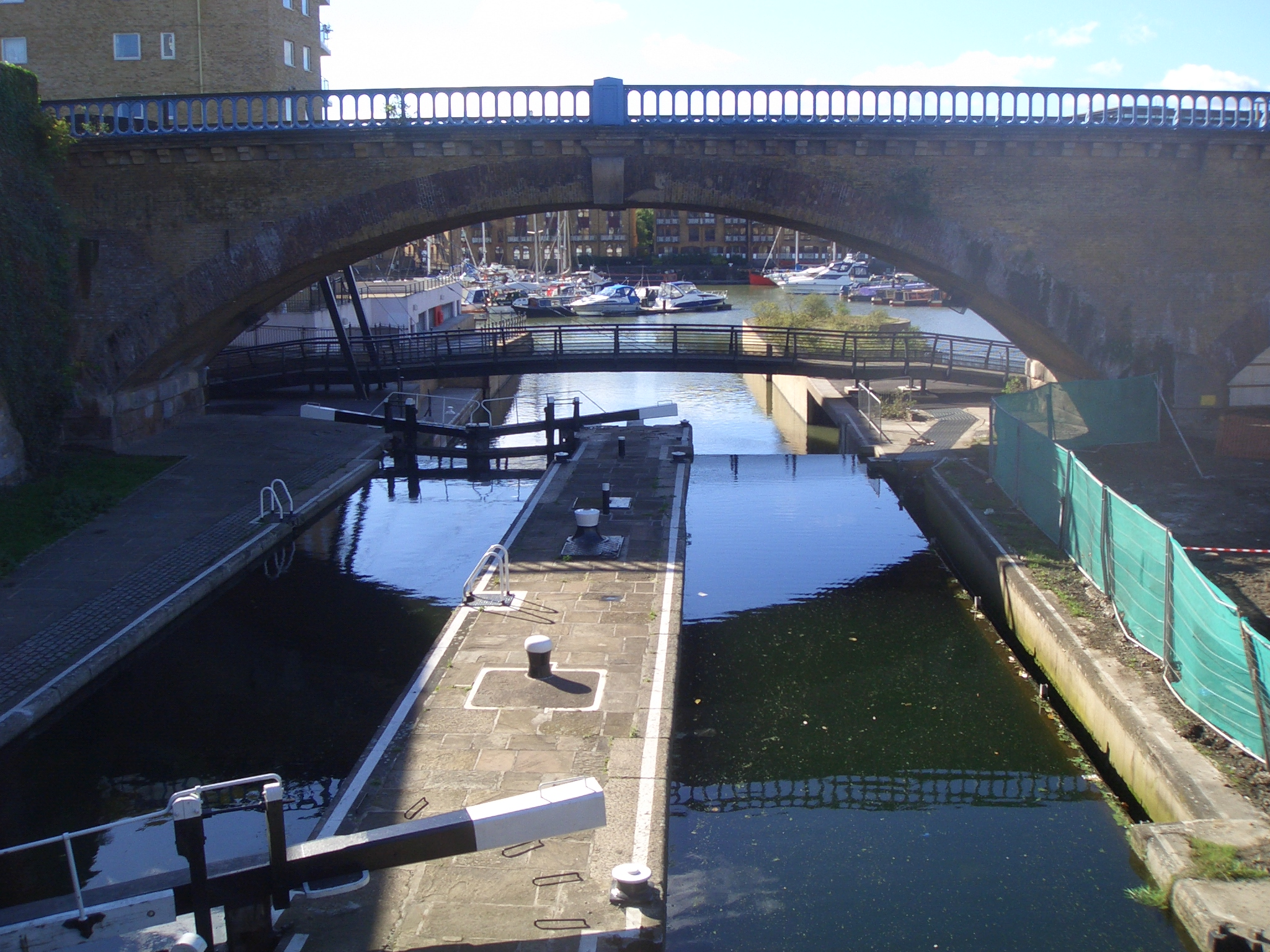
Commercial Road Lock on Regent's Canal where it meets the Limehouse Basin

The Regent's Canal forms a junction with the old Grand Junction Canal at Little Venice, a short distance north of Paddington Basin. After passing through the Maida Hill and Lisson Grove tunnels, the canal curves round the northern edge of Regent's Park, passing London Zoo and skirting round the base of Primrose Hill. It continues through Camden Town and King's Cross Central. It performs a sharp bend at Camley Street Natural Park, following Goods Way where it flows behind both St Pancras railway station and King's Cross railway station. The canal opens out into Battlebridge Basin originally known as Horsfall Basin, home of the London Canal Museum. Continuing eastwards beyond the Islington tunnel it forms the southern end of Broadway Market and meets the Hertford Union Canal at Victoria Park, East London. It turns south towards the Limehouse Basin, where it meets the Limehouse Cut, and ends as it joins the River Thames.

== History ==
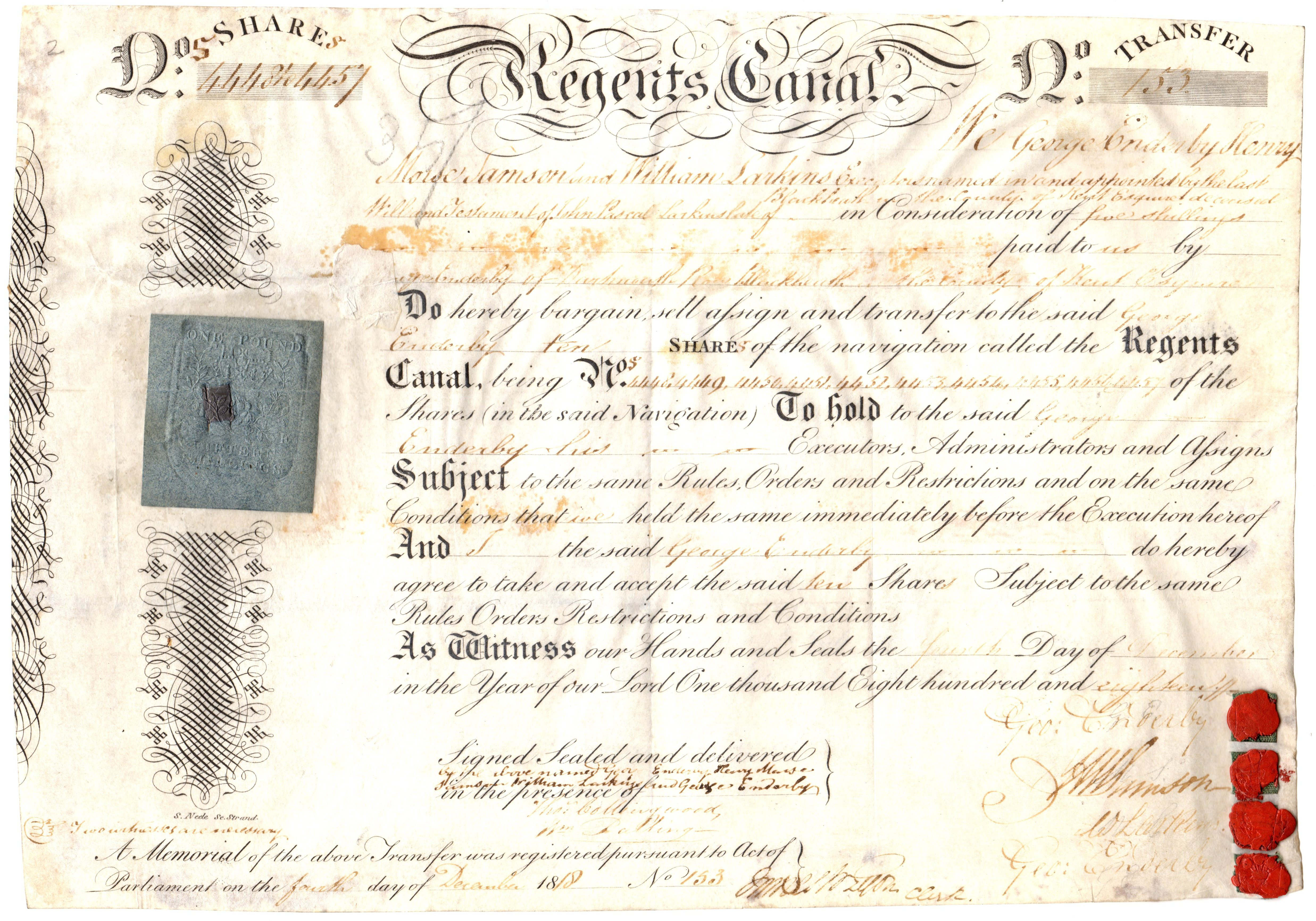
Regent's Canal: Transfer certificate of 10 shares, issued 1 December 1818

Regent's Canal Act 1812
- Act of Parliament
- Parliament of the United Kingdom
- Long title: An Act for making and maintaining a navigable Canal from the Grand Junction Canal in the Parish of Paddington, to the River Thames in the Parish of Limehouse, with a Collateral Cut in the Parish of Saint Leonard, Shoreditch, in the County of Middlesex.
- Citation: 52 Geo. 3. c. cxcv
- Territorial extent: United Kingdom

Dates
- Royal assent: 13 July 1812
Other legislation
Amended by	Regent's Canal Act 1819

Text of statute as originally enacted

First proposed by Thomas Homer in 1802 as a link from the Paddington arm of the then Grand Junction Canal (opened in 1801) with the River Thames at Limehouse, the Regent's Canal was built during the early 19th century after the Regent's Canal Act 1812 (52 Geo. 3. c. cxcv) was passed. Noted architect and town planner John Nash was a director of the company; in 1811 he had produced a masterplan for George IV, then Prince Regent, to redevelop a large area of central north London – as a result, the Regent's Canal was included in the scheme, running for part of its distance along the northern edge of Regent's Park.

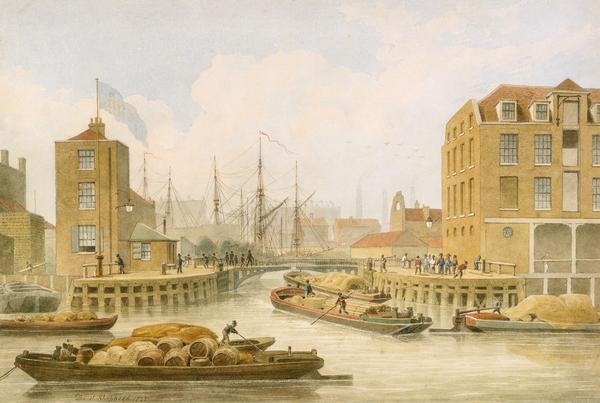
The entrance to the Regent's Canal at Limehouse, 1823

As with many Nash projects, the detailed design was passed to one of his assistants, in this case James Morgan, who was appointed chief engineer of the canal company. Work began on 14 October 1812. The first section from Paddington to Camden Town opened in 1816 and included a 251-metre (274 yd) long tunnel under Maida Hill east of an area now known as 'Little Venice', and a much shorter tunnel, just 48 metres (52 yd) long, under Lisson Grove. The Camden to Limehouse section, including the 886-metre (969 yd) long Islington Tunnel and the Regent's Canal Dock (used to transfer cargo from seafaring vessels to canal barges – today known as Limehouse Basin), opened four years later on 1 August 1820. Various intermediate basins were also constructed (e.g.: Cumberland Basin to the east of Regent's Park, Battlebridge Basin, close to Kings Cross, and City Road Basin). Many other basins such as Wenlock Basin, Kingsland Basin, St. Pancras Stone and Coal Basin, and one in front of the Great Northern Railway's Granary were also built, and some of these survive.

All the locks were built with duplicate chambers to facilitate the heavy barge traffic. With the demise of commercial traffic in the early 1970s, at the end of 1973, the British Waterways Board embarked on a three-year programme to convert one chamber at each lock into an overflow weir to facilitate unmanned use by pleasure craft without the risk of serious flooding due to incorrect use of the paddles.

The City Road Basin, the nearest to the City of London, soon eclipsed the Paddington Basin in the amount of goods carried, principally coal and building materials. These were goods that were being shipped locally, in contrast to the canal's original purpose of transshipping imports to the Midlands. The opening of the London and Birmingham Railway in 1838 actually increased the tonnage of coal carried by the canal. By the early twentieth century, with the Midland trade lost to the railways, and more deliveries made by road, the canal had fallen into a long decline.

=== Macclesfield Bridge disaster ===
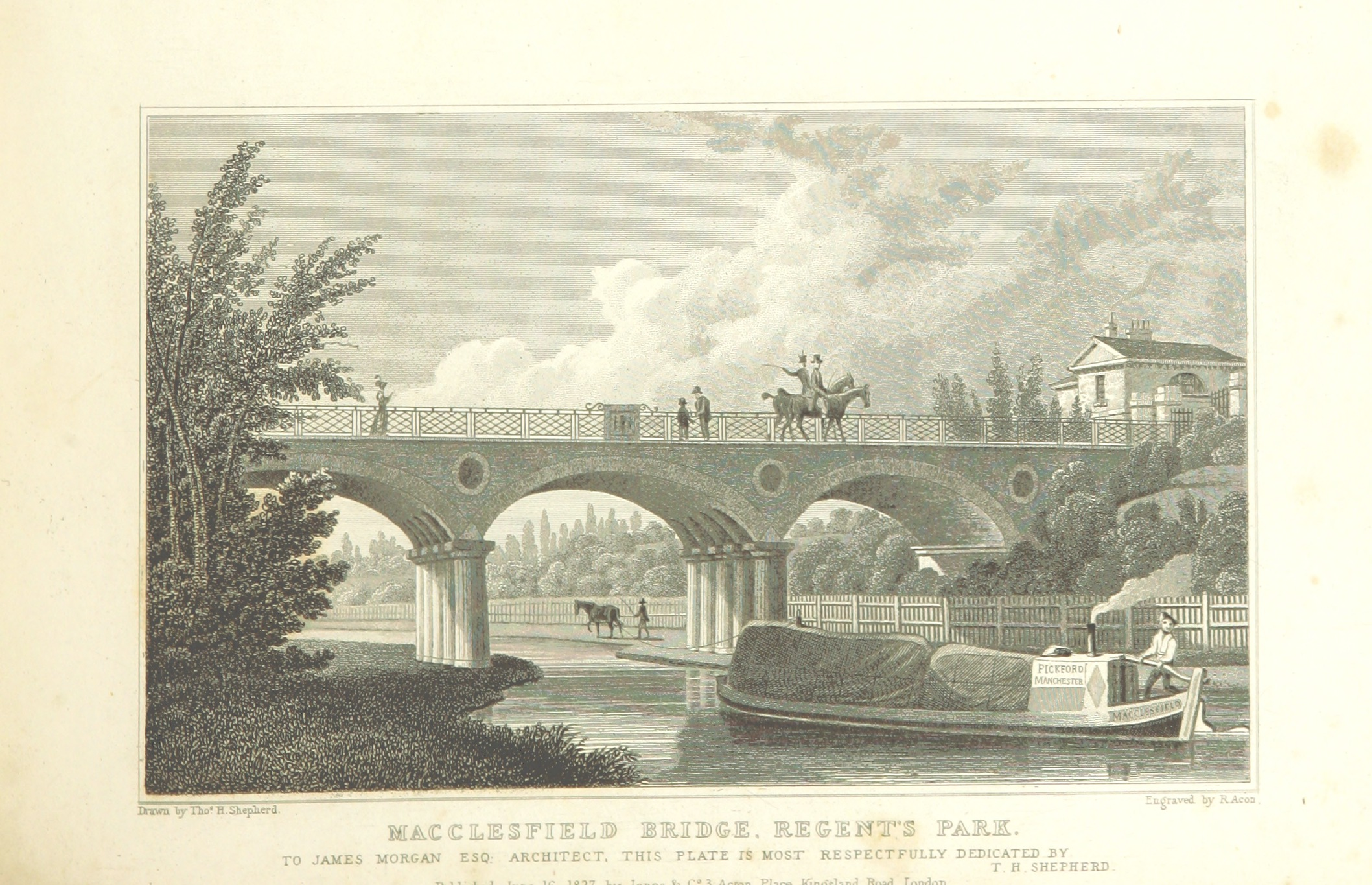
Macclesfield Bridge before the explosion. After the explosion it was also known as Blow Up Bridge.

Just before 5 am on 2 October 1874 the narrowboat barge Tilbury which was loaded with sugar, nuts, three barrels of petroleum and around five tons of gunpowder exploded right under the Macclesfield Bridge, just outside London Zoo. Until the explosion, the Tilbury was part of a convoy consisting of a tugboat and three narrowboats travelling westwards heading for a quarry in the West Midlands.

==== Damage and aftermath ====
All the people on board died; captain Charles Baxton, a labourer named William Taylor, a third man and a young boy. The Macclesfield Bridge was destroyed and rebuilt in 1876 reusing the cast iron pillars (made in Coalbrookdale according to an inscription at their top), but turning them by 180° (canal side towards tow path side) so tow rope grooves that were created before the incident can be seen on the outer side of the columns.

The explosion was heard 20 miles away. Debris flew in all directions; the roofs of surrounding houses blew off; windows were smashed and trees uprooted; and dead fish rained down on the West End. The tugboat's keel was found embedded in a house 300 yards away. The bridge was nick-named the 'Blow-Up Bridge'.

The damage would have been far worse had the barge exploded in the highly populated areas of Camden and Islington, which the convoy had passed through earlier that morning.

The canal company that owned Tilbury was condemned for gross negligence in permitting the “highly imprudent and improper” practice of carrying petroleum and gunpowder aboard the same barge.

The incident accelerated the passing of the Explosives Act 1875, which regulates the manufacture and carriage of dangerous substances.

=== Railway projects ===
There were a number of abortive projects to convert the route of the canal into a railway. In September 1845 a special general assembly of the proprietors approved the sale of the canal at the price of one million pounds to a group of businessmen who had formed the Regent's Canal Railway Company for the purpose. The advertisement for the company explained:

The vast importance of this undertaking, whereby a junction will be effected between all existing and projected railways north of the Thames, combined with the advantage of a General City Terminus, is too obvious to require comment. By the proposed railway, passengers and goods will be brought into the heart of the City at a great saving of time and expense, and facilities will be afforded for the more expeditious transmission of the mails to most parts of the kingdom.

The railway company subsequently failed, but in 1846 the directors of the canal went about trying to obtain an act of Parliament to allow them to build a railway along its banks. The scheme was abandoned in the face of vigorous opposition, especially from the government who objected to the idea of a railway passing through Regent's Park. In 1859, two further schemes to convert the canal into a railway were proposed. One, from a company called the Central London Railway and Dock Company, was accepted by the directors, but once again the railway company failed. In 1860 the Regent's Canal Company proposed a railway track alongside the canal from Kings Cross to Limehouse, but funds could not be raised. The Metropolitan Railway that opened to the south in 1863 served much the same purpose of linking the lines radiating north of London.

Regent's Canal City and Docks Railway Act 1892
- Act of Parliament
- Parliament of the United Kingdom
- Long title: An Act for the abandonment of certain of the authorised Railways of the Regent's Canal City and Docks Railway Company for extending the period for the compulsory purchase of lands for and for the completion of others of such authorised Railways for changing the name of the Company for making other provisions with respect to the Company and their affairs and for other purposes.
- Citation: 55 & 56 Vict. c. clxxxviii

Dates
- Royal assent: 27 June 1892

Regents Canal and Dock Act 1900
- Act of Parliament
- Parliament of the United Kingdom
- Long title: An Act to consolidate the Debenture Stocks of the North Metropolitan Railway and Canal Company to amend in certain respects the Acts relating to the Company to change the name of the Company and for other purposes.
- Citation: 63 & 64 Vict. c. cxviii

Dates
- Royal assent: 30 July 1900

Text of statute as originally enacted

In 1883, after some years of negotiation, the canal was sold to a company called the Regent's Canal and City Docks Railway Company at a cost of £1,170,585. The company altered its name to the North Metropolitan Railway and Canal Company by the Regent's Canal City and Docks Railway Act 1892 (55 & 56 Vict. c. clxxxviii), but no railway was ever built; instead it raised money for dock and canal improvement and eventually, in 1904, became the Regent's Canal and Dock Company by the Regents Canal and Dock Act 1900 (63 & 64 Vict. c. cxviii).

The Regent's Canal and Dock Company became part of the merged Grand Union Canal Company on 1 January 1929.

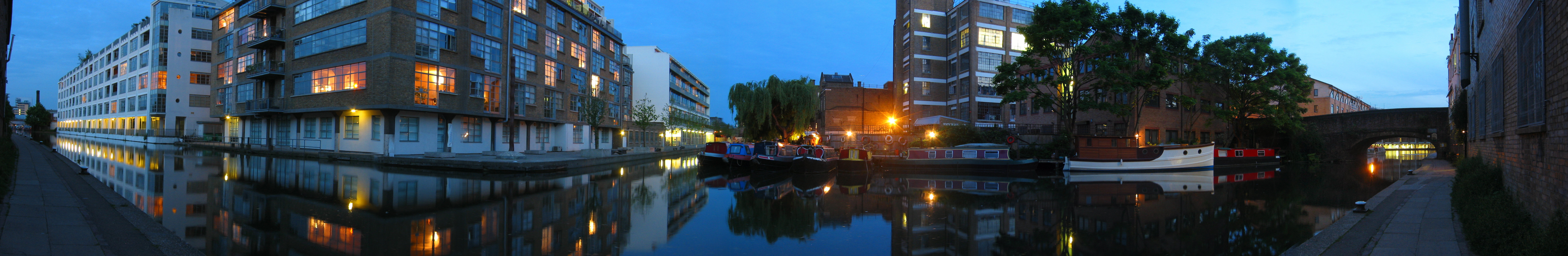
Wenlock Basin, Islington (2004)

=== New uses ===
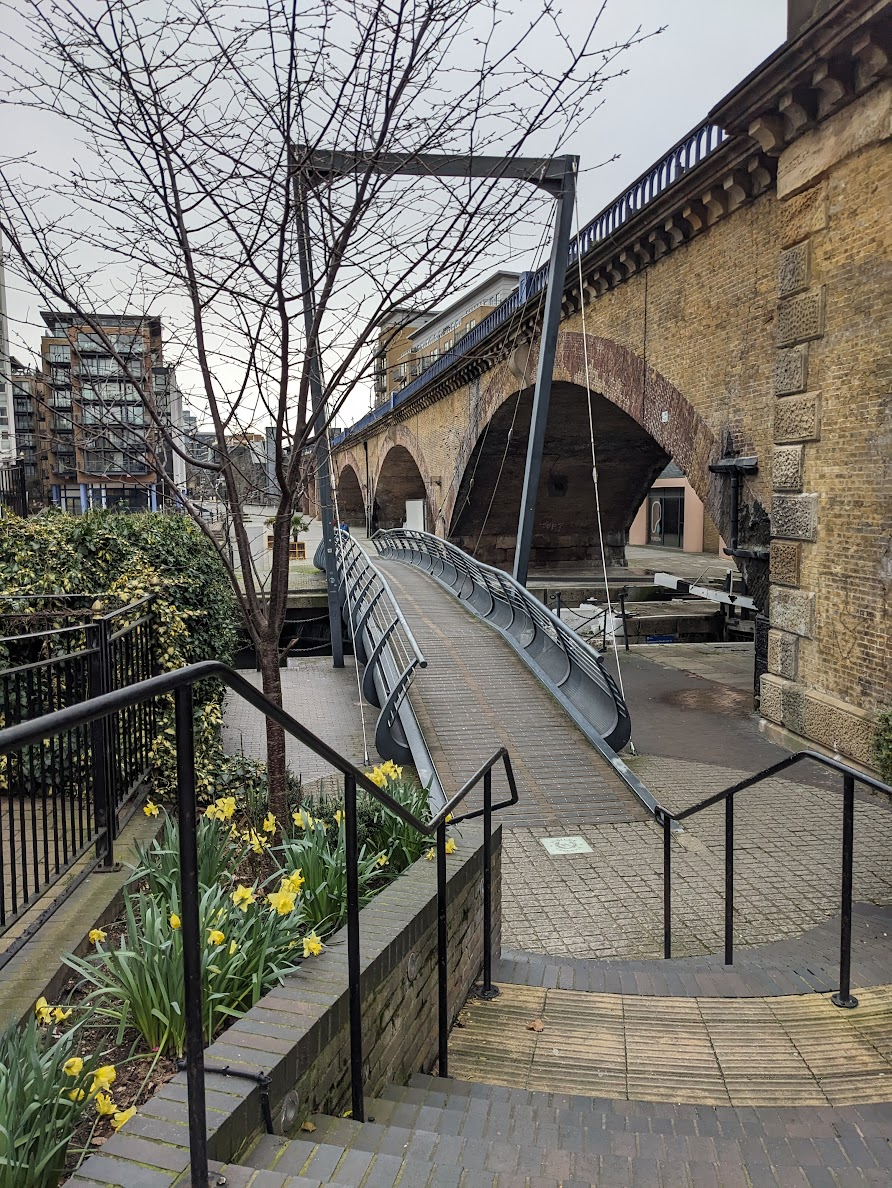
Modern bridge over the canal into Limehouse Basin next to the DLR

A new purpose was found for the canal route in 1979, when the Central Electricity Generating Board (CEGB) installed underground cables in a trough below the towpath between St John's Wood and City Road. These 400 kV cables now form part of the National Grid, supplying electrical power to London. Pumped canal water is circulated as a coolant for the high-voltage cables. The canal is frequently used today for pleasure cruising; a regular waterbus service operates between Maida Vale and Camden, running hourly during the summer months.

The canal's towpath has become a busy cycle route for commuters. National Cycle Route 1 includes the stretch along the canal towpath from Limehouse Basin to Mile End. British Waterways carried out several studies into the effects of sharing the towpath between cyclists and pedestrians, all of which have concluded that despite the limited width there were relatively few problems at the time of the audits. More recently, in 2019, The Guardian reported on instances of conflict between pedestrians and cyclists.

== Maximum craft dimensions ==
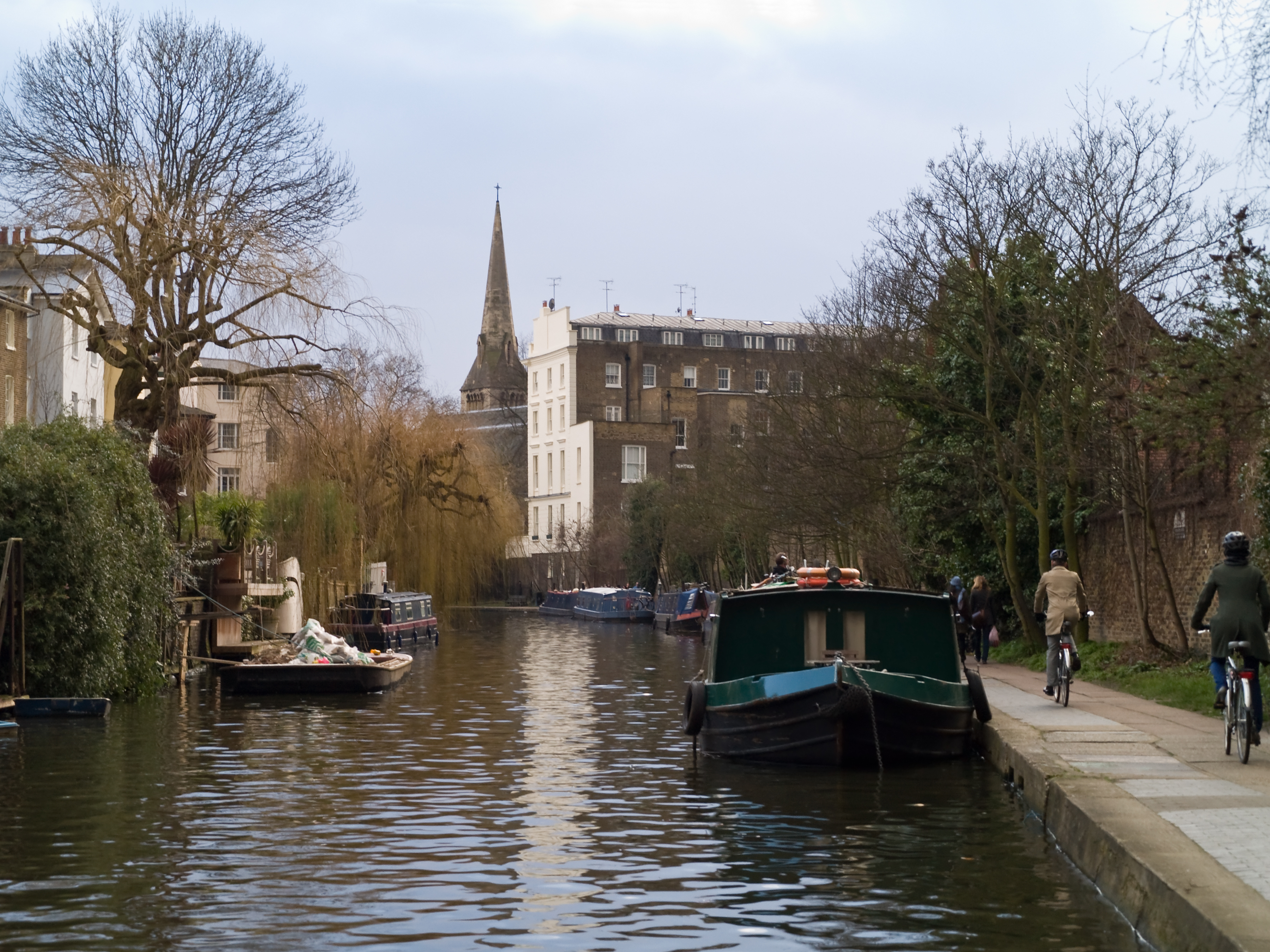
The Regent's Canal near St Mark's Regents' Park

On the Regent's Canal the maximum length is 21.95 metres (72.0 ft), with a beam of 4.27 metres (14.0 ft) and a headroom of 2.79 metres (9 ft 2 in). The navigational depth is, on average 1.15 m (3 ft 6 in).

== Culture ==
In 2012, playwright Rob Inglis was awarded a £16,000 Arts Council grant to write Regent's Canal, a Folk Opera, a musical that celebrates the 200th anniversary of the digging of the canal. It played in a number of locations around London in 2012.

== See also ==
- St Pancras Cruising Club
- Canal & River Trust
- London Canal Museum
- Camden Lock
- City Road Basin
- Battlebridge Basin
- List of canal basins in Great Britain
- List of canal aqueducts in Great Britain
- List of canal locks in Great Britain
- List of canal tunnels in Great Britain

Next confluence upstream	River Thames	Next confluence downstream
River Neckinger (south)	Regent's Canal	River Ravensbourne (south) (Deptford Creek)
