= Geography of London =

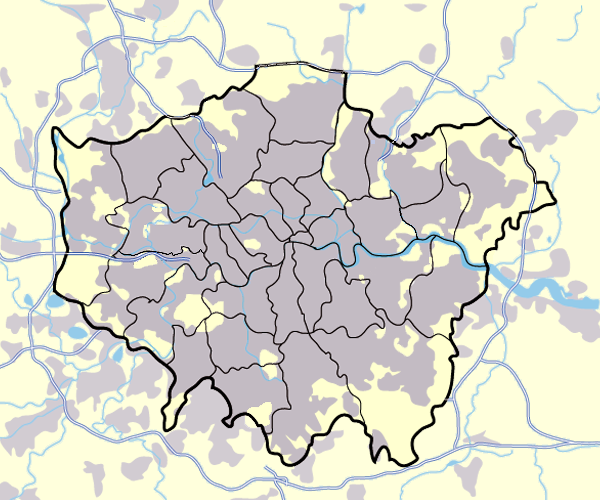
Outline of the London region

London is the largest urban area and the capital city of the United Kingdom. It lies in the southeastern part of the island of Great Britain. The London region covers 1,579 square kilometres (610 sq mi), and had a population of 8.982 million in 2019 and a population density of 5,596 people per square km in 2021. A larger area—the London Metropolitan Region or the London Metropolitan Agglomeration—covers 8,382 square kilometres (3,236 sq mi) and had 12,653,500 people, at a density of 1,510 per square kilometre.

London is a port on the Thames (see main article Port of London), a navigable river. The river has had a major influence on the development of the city. London began on the Thames' north bank and for a long time the main focus of the city remained on the north side of the Thames. For many centuries London Bridge was the only bridge in or close to the city. When more bridges were built in the 18th century, the city expanded in all directions as the mostly flat or gently rolling countryside presented no obstacle to growth.

== 360 degree panorama ==
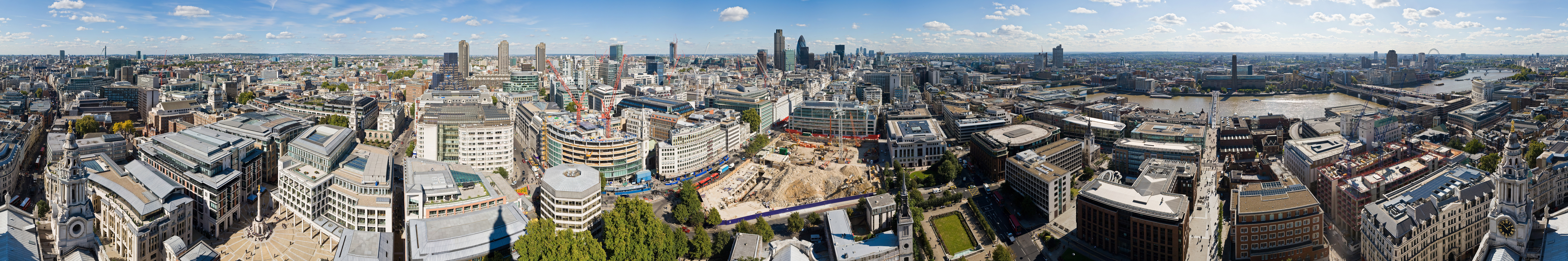
A panorama of modern London, taken from the Golden Gallery of Saint Paul's Cathedral

== Rivers and canals ==
=== River Thames ===
The River Thames is the main river of London, flowing west to east across the London Basin. The river cuts into the London basin through the Goring Gap, draining parts of the Cotswolds and Vale of Aylesbury to the west. Similarly tributaries such as the Mole cut through the North Downs into the basin from the south. Further downstream the flow of the Thames is boosted by springs which open onto the chalky riverbed.

The Thames was once a much broader, shallower river than it is today. It has been extensively embanked. The Thames is tidal (the Tideway) up to Teddington Lock, and London is vulnerable to flooding by storm surges. The threat has increased over time due to a slow but continuous rise in high water level, caused by both the slow 'tilting' of Britain (up in the north and down in the south) caused by post-glacial rebound and the gradual rise in sea levels due to climate change. The Thames Barrier was constructed across the Thames at Woolwich in the 1970s to deal with this threat, but in early 2005 it was suggested that a ten-mile-long (16 km) barrier further downstream might be required to deal with the flood risk in the future. Within London a considerable number of rivers and streams flow into the Thames, some large enough to have exerted a significant influence on the geography of the area. Many of the smaller London tributaries now flow underground.

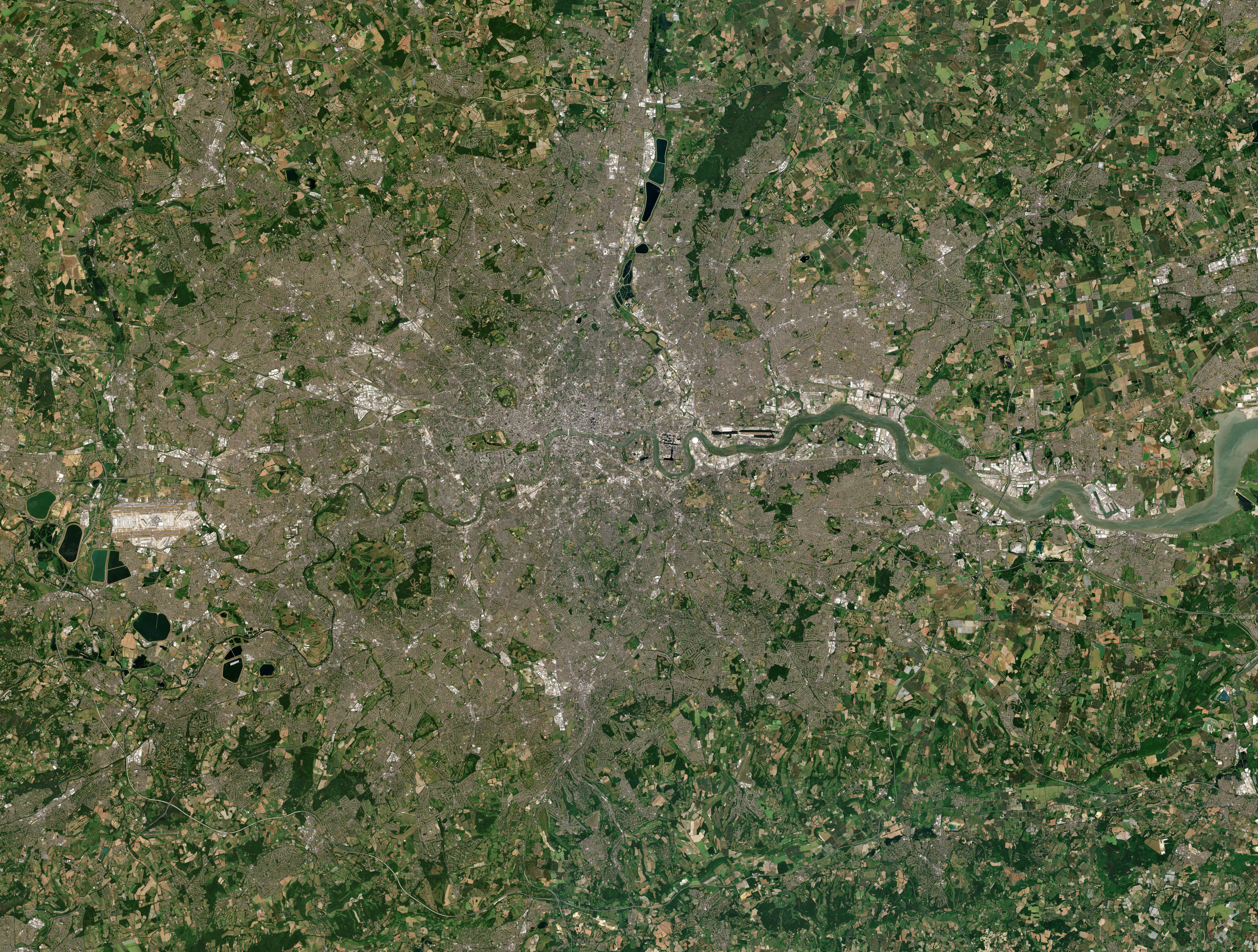
Satellite image by Sentinel-2 satellite

Map of London from OpenStreetMap

=== Left bank tributaries ===
Larger left bank tributaries include the Colne, Crane, Brent, Lea (tidal reach known as 'Bow Creek'), Roding (tidal reach known as 'Barking Creek'), Rom (lower reaches known as the Beam) and Ingrebourne. There are many smaller, now often largely subterranean streams including Stamford Brook, Counter's Creek (also known as 'Chelsea Creek'), Westbourne, Tyburn, Tyburn Brook, Fleet and Walbrook. Some of the tributaries are themselves large enough to have named tributary streams, for example the Moselle, Salmons Brook and Pymmes Brook that feed the Lea, and the Silk Stream and Dollis Brook that feed the Brent.

Larger rivers such as the Lea have influenced local geography in several ways:

- A river and its marshland formed a significant barrier to east–west movement: the Lea formed a natural boundary between the historic areas of Middlesex and Essex.
- The valley of the Lea formed a transport route, including the river and later Lee Navigation, as well as roads including the Roman Ermine Street, the Hertford Road (A1010) and the later Great Cambridge Road (A10) and A1055. The Lea Valley is also followed by two routes of what became the Great Eastern Railway, and had important marshalling yards and locomotive works at Temple Mills.
- The river provided power for numerous water mills, such as the Royal Small Arms Factory at Enfield and nearby Waltham Abbey Royal Gunpowder Mills, Wright's Flour Mill (London's last surviving working mill) at Ponders End and the Three Mills at Stratford.
- In the 19th century the lower Lea became an important area for the manufacture of chemicals, in part based on the supply of by-products such as sulphur and ammonia from the Gas Light and Coke Company's works at Bow Common.
- In the 20th century the combination of transport, wide expanses of flat land and electricity from riverside and canalside plants such as Brimsdown, Hackney, Bow and West Ham led to expansion of industries such as Enfield Rolling Mills and Enfield Cables, Thorn Electrical Industries, Belling, Glover and Main, MK Electric, Gestetner, JAP Industries, etc. Much industry has now gone, to be replaced by warehousing and retail parks.

The valley also became very important for London's water supply, as the source of the water transported by the New River aqueduct, but also as the location for the Lee Valley Reservoir Chain, stretching from Enfield through Tottenham and Walthamstow.

A second significant corridor of canal, railways and industries was associated with the Brent, stretching from the Thames at Brentford, through Isleworth, Greenford, Alperton and Park Royal.

The Colne (the historic boundary between Middlesex and Buckinghamshire) forms much of the western boundary of the county of Greater London.

=== Right-bank tributaries ===
Significant tributaries include the Mole, Wandle, Ravensbourne (tidal reach known as 'Deptford Creek') with its tributary the Quaggy, and the Darent and its tributary the Cray which together form part of the eastern boundary of Greater London. Smaller, some mainly subterranean tributaries include the Hogsmill River, Beverley Brook, Neckinger and Effra.

The Wandle formed south London's nearest equivalent to the Lea Valley, with an industrial corridor stretching from the Thames at Wandsworth through Merton and Mitcham to Beddington and Croydon. A smaller corridor followed the Ravensbourne from the Thames at Deptford Creek through Lewisham, and many of the smaller rivers also once had mills.

=== Canals ===
A number of canals or canalised rivers have been constructed in the London area, mostly in the late 18th and early 19th centuries. These were originally for goods traffic, which has largely ceased. Within London the canals carried coal from the docks to many canal-side gas works and power stations (for example Brimsdown), and timber to timber yards, furniture manufacturers etc. (for example in Edmonton). Although most of the canals still survive today, they are used primarily for leisure craft.

==== North of the Thames ====
Canal construction in the London area started with navigation works on the Lea and Stort from 1424 onwards, leading to the River Lee Navigation and Bow Back Rivers. Initially used for transport of agricultural product from Hertfordshire, this later became an important industrial waterway connecting the heavily industrialised Lea Valley with the docks. A short-cut to the Thames avoiding the winding mouth of the Lea (Bow Creek) and closer to central London was provided by the Limehouse Cut (1760).

A connection from London to the Midlands had been provided by the Oxford Canal since 1790, but this required navigation up the upper Thames to Oxford. The completion of the Grand Junction Canal (later Grand Union) from the Thames at Brentford (1798 onwards) provided a more convenient route. In 1801 an arm was opened from the Grand Junction at Hayes to a large basin at Paddington. This was later linked to the Thames at Limehouse (close to the Limehouse Cut) by the Regent's Canal, completed in 1820. This in turn was linked to the Lea system by the Hertford Union Canal or Hackney Cut (1830). The Regent's Canal had many substantial basins (City Road Basin, Kingsland Basin, Battlebridge Basin, St Pancras Basin, Cumberland Basin etc.), originally lined with industries dependent on traffic from the docks.

The City Canal (1805) was built to provide a short-cut across the Isle of Dogs. This was later incorporated into the West India Docks and is no longer connected to the Thames at its upstream end. Other short canals connecting to the Thames included the Grosvenor Canal (1825) and the Kensington Canal (1828).

==== South of the Thames ====
The former Grand Surrey Canal (1807) was intended to run from the Thames at Rotherhithe to the industrial town of Mitcham, but got no further than Camberwell. It closed with the Surrey Commercial Docks in 1970 and has been filled. The Grand Surrey Canal linked to the Croydon Canal (1809) which continued as far as West Croydon; this closed in 1836.

Further afield a link from London to Bristol is provided by the Kennet & Avon Canal which connects the Avon at Bath via the River Kennet to the Thames at Reading. Basingstoke could once be reached via the Thames, Wey Navigation and the Basingstoke Canal. The south coast at Littlehampton could be reached via the Thames, Wey and the Wey and Arun Canal.

=== Islands in the Thames ===
Note: Only the largest islands are listed here. A longer list can be found in Islands in the River Thames

- Chiswick Eyot
- Eel Pie Island
- Isle of Dogs
  - Millwall
  - Cubitt Town

== Topography ==
A list of the highest points can be found in List of highest points in London

At the largest scale London lies within the bowl of the London Basin, with most of the built-up area lying on the Tertiary and younger sediments, and only a small part of south London (Sutton, Banstead and Croydon) lying on the chalk backslope of the North Downs. The centre of the basin is dominated by the modern valley of the Thames, which forms a level corridor running from west to east. The modern floodplain is around half a mile wide to the west of Greater London, expanding to two miles wide to the east. This is bordered by slightly higher and older terraces often extending several miles from the floodplain, for example in Hounslow and Southwark. Other significant river valleys include those of the Colne, Crane, Brent, Lea (with a floodplain more than a mile wide in places), Wandle and Ravensbourne, which run north and south towards the Thames.

There are a few notable hills in Greater London, but none of them more than a few hundred feet high, and they have not impeded the development of the city in all directions. It is therefore very roughly circular.

=== The hills in the City of London ===
The hills in the City of London, from west to east, Ludgate Hill, Corn Hill and Tower Hill, are presumed to have influenced the precise siting of the early city, but they are very minor, and most of central London is almost flat. These hills are developed in various gravel terrace deposits of the river Thames.

=== North London ===
To the north of the city a ridge capped by the mid-to-lower basin's residual sands known as the Bagshot formation forms high ground (in places around 130m) including Hampstead Heath and Highgate Hill. The ridge continues briefly eastwards over the London clay to form Crouch Hill and Queen's Wood. Immediately south, fingers of the ridge run down towards Primrose Hill and Parliament Hill. This ridge is a surviving area of Tertiary rocks younger than the London Clay, surrounded by former routes of the Thames where much younger deposits overlie the clay. Smaller outliers of such Tertiary high ground exist to the west of the main ridge especially relatively lowly Hanger Lane; the knoll Harrow Hill, and smaller Horsendon Hill where the Claygate Beds (the top of the London Clay formation) are capped by much younger gravels deposited by watercourses.

North of this ridge, between the valleys of the rivers Lea and Brent, lies a second ridge (a little under 100m), formed of much younger Pleistocene deposits. Running west from Muswell Hill to Church End, Finchley and north to Whetstone, this is capped by glacial till marking the southern limit of glaciation. This overlies Dollis Hill Gravel marking the line of a former southern tributary of the Thames, when the Thames flowed further to the north than it does today, through the Vale of St Albans. At its eastern end at Alexandra Palace the gravel forms the top of the ridge, as it does in smaller hills to the west including Dollis Hill itself.

Further north, ridges of Claygate Beds overlain by the pre-glacial Stanmore gravel form the slightly broken-up Grim's Dyke Ridge: Mill Hill, Totteridge, Arkley and Monken Hadley, Elstree, and Stanmore and Harrow Weald Commons.

Much of east and northeast London lies on the modern floodplain of the Thames (spared from flood by the Thames barrier) or older terraces, a notable interruption being the remains of the artificial Beckton Alps. Pole Hill at Chingford and Lippitts Hill near Gilwell Park are capped by small outliers of Claygate Beds, while the higher parts of Epping Forest such as High Beach are Claygate and Bagshot beds with later gravels.

=== South London ===
Faulting and folding brings the chalk close to the surface just south of the Thames in Lewisham and Greenwich. This has resulted in a notable ridge formed of Palaeocene deposits (the Lambeth Group), which includes Shooter's Hill, Greenwich Park and Blackheath. West of the valley of the Ravensbourne, this ridge continues as Telegraph Hill, Nunhead and Honor Oak, towards Denmark Hill. To the south Crystal Palace and Sydenham Hill lie on another outlier of Claygate beds.

In south-west London the lower terraces of the Thames of its west stop abruptly at a notable bluff cut into the London Clay against Richmond Hill. The higher ground across the east, save for the broad valley of the Wandle is capped across northern Wimbledon and the Norwood Ridge by Claygate Beds and older Thames gravels; the broad western part of this is dissected by the valley of Beverley Brook, which separates Richmond Park from Wimbledon Common.

== Climate ==
The climate of London is broadly similar to the rest of the UK, with warm summers, cool winters, no wet or dry season, and often moderate to strong winds. It is classed as a temperate maritime climate according to the Köppen climate classification system. In terms of the local climate profile, the temperature tends to increase towards the centre of the urban area, primarily because of the urban heat island effect, but also because London's topography results in the central area being the lowest part of the region in terms of altitude.

Daytime winter temperatures in London are around 8 °C (46 °F), but can vary from as high as 16 °C (61 °F), down to as low as −7.4 °C (18.7 °F), as occurred during January 1987. Night time temperatures hover a little above freezing, with frosts typically on 25-45 nights, depending on location. Absolute minimum temperatures range from −10.0 °C (14.0 °F) at St James Park, in central London down to −16.1 °C (3.0 °F) at Northolt during January 1962 - the lowest official temperature in the London area. More typically though −12 °C (10 °F) to −13 °C (9 °F) is the record minimum for most parts of London, as is shown by the Kew, Heathrow and Hampstead figures. The lowest temperature to occur in recent years was −14.2 °C (6.4 °F) at Northolt during 2010. During summer, daytime temperatures are typically around 23 °C (73 °F). Typically, according to 1981-2010 normals, the warmest day of the year at Heathrow will reach 31.6 °C (88.9 °F), and 26.4 days will attain a temperature of 25.1 °C (77.2 °F) or above. Kew's record high of 38.1 °C (100.6 °F) is the highest temperature in the London area. In the summer of 2018, there was a hosepipe ban throughout London due to the high temperatures and lack of rain. London is vulnerable to climate change in the United Kingdom, and there is increasing concern among hydrological experts that London households may run out of water before 2050.

Sunshine tends to increase towards the west of the London area, with annual average at Heathrow and Kew in excess of 1,600 hours, at Northwood and Hampstead, in the 1,500-1,600 hour range, but at Greenwich, below 1,500 hours. The sunniest year on record at Heathrow was 2003, with, coincidentally, just over 2,003 hours of sunshine.

Heathrow - Airport Weather Station to the west of London,

Climate data for Heathrow Airport WMO ID: 03772; coordinates 51°28′45″N 0°27′02″W; elevation: 25 m (82 ft); 1991–2020 normals, extremes 1948–present
| Month | Jan | Feb | Mar | Apr | May | Jun | Jul | Aug | Sep | Oct | Nov | Dec | Year |
|---|---|---|---|---|---|---|---|---|---|---|---|---|---|
| Record high °C (°F) | 16.0 (60.8) | 20.1 (68.2) | 23.8 (74.8) | 28.5 (83.3) | 35.1 (95.2) | 36.4 (97.5) | 40.2 (104.4) | 37.9 (100.2) | 33.0 (91.4) | 28.8 (83.8) | 18.6 (65.5) | 16.6 (61.9) | 40.2 (104.4) |
| Mean daily maximum °C (°F) | 8.4 (47.1) | 9.0 (48.2) | 11.7 (53.1) | 15.0 (59.0) | 18.4 (65.1) | 21.6 (70.9) | 23.9 (75.0) | 23.4 (74.1) | 20.2 (68.4) | 15.8 (60.4) | 11.5 (52.7) | 8.8 (47.8) | 15.7 (60.3) |
| Daily mean °C (°F) | 5.6 (42.1) | 5.8 (42.4) | 7.9 (46.2) | 10.5 (50.9) | 13.7 (56.7) | 16.8 (62.2) | 19.0 (66.2) | 18.7 (65.7) | 15.9 (60.6) | 12.3 (54.1) | 8.4 (47.1) | 5.9 (42.6) | 11.7 (53.1) |
| Mean daily minimum °C (°F) | 2.7 (36.9) | 2.7 (36.9) | 4.1 (39.4) | 6.0 (42.8) | 9.1 (48.4) | 12.0 (53.6) | 14.2 (57.6) | 14.1 (57.4) | 11.6 (52.9) | 8.8 (47.8) | 5.3 (41.5) | 3.1 (37.6) | 7.8 (46.0) |
| Record low °C (°F) | −24 (−11) | −13.6 (7.5) | −8.1 (17.4) | −6.6 (20.1) | −0.9 (30.4) | 1.5 (34.7) | 5.6 (42.1) | 5.9 (42.6) | 1.8 (35.2) | −3.3 (26.1) | −7.0 (19.4) | −17.8 (0.0) | −24 (−11) |
| Average precipitation mm (inches) | 58.8 (2.31) | 45.0 (1.77) | 38.8 (1.53) | 42.3 (1.67) | 45.9 (1.81) | 47.3 (1.86) | 45.8 (1.80) | 52.8 (2.08) | 49.6 (1.95) | 65.1 (2.56) | 66.6 (2.62) | 57.1 (2.25) | 615.0 (24.21) |
| Average precipitation days (≥ 1.0 mm) | 11.5 | 9.5 | 8.5 | 8.8 | 8.0 | 8.3 | 7.9 | 8.4 | 7.9 | 10.8 | 11.2 | 10.8 | 111.7 |
| Mean monthly sunshine hours | 61.1 | 78.8 | 124.5 | 176.7 | 207.5 | 208.4 | 217.8 | 202.1 | 157.1 | 115.2 | 70.7 | 55.0 | 1,674.8 |
Source 1: Met Office
Source 2: KNMI

Kew - Weather station in the South West part of London, adjacent to the River Thames.

Climate data for Kew Gardens WMO ID: 99095; coordinates 51°28′55″N 0°17′40″W; elevation: 6 m (20 ft); 1991–2020 normals, extremes 1881–present
| Month | Jan | Feb | Mar | Apr | May | Jun | Jul | Aug | Sep | Oct | Nov | Dec | Year |
|---|---|---|---|---|---|---|---|---|---|---|---|---|---|
| Record high °C (°F) | 16.5 (61.7) | 21.2 (70.2) | 24.5 (76.1) | 28.4 (83.1) | 35.1 (95.2) | 34.6 (94.3) | 40.1 (104.2) | 38.1 (100.6) | 33.2 (91.8) | 29.2 (84.6) | 19.4 (66.9) | 16.8 (62.2) | 40.1 (104.2) |
| Mean daily maximum °C (°F) | 8.6 (47.5) | 9.2 (48.6) | 11.9 (53.4) | 15.1 (59.2) | 18.4 (65.1) | 21.4 (70.5) | 23.8 (74.8) | 23.4 (74.1) | 20.3 (68.5) | 16.0 (60.8) | 11.6 (52.9) | 8.9 (48.0) | 15.7 (60.3) |
| Daily mean °C (°F) | 5.3 (41.5) | 5.6 (42.1) | 7.7 (45.9) | 10.1 (50.2) | 13.3 (55.9) | 16.2 (61.2) | 18.5 (65.3) | 18.2 (64.8) | 15.4 (59.7) | 11.9 (53.4) | 8.0 (46.4) | 5.6 (42.1) | 11.3 (52.3) |
| Mean daily minimum °C (°F) | 2.0 (35.6) | 2.0 (35.6) | 3.5 (38.3) | 5.1 (41.2) | 8.2 (46.8) | 11.0 (51.8) | 13.2 (55.8) | 13.0 (55.4) | 10.5 (50.9) | 7.8 (46.0) | 4.3 (39.7) | 2.3 (36.1) | 6.9 (44.4) |
| Record low °C (°F) | −12.6 (9.3) | −11.8 (10.8) | −8.3 (17.1) | −4.2 (24.4) | −1.5 (29.3) | 1.5 (34.7) | 5.3 (41.5) | 4.3 (39.7) | −1.6 (29.1) | −5.4 (22.3) | −6.6 (20.1) | −12.0 (10.4) | −12.6 (9.3) |
| Average precipitation mm (inches) | 59.9 (2.36) | 45.4 (1.79) | 39.0 (1.54) | 43.6 (1.72) | 44.6 (1.76) | 49.7 (1.96) | 45.2 (1.78) | 55.1 (2.17) | 51.9 (2.04) | 67.9 (2.67) | 66.0 (2.60) | 59.2 (2.33) | 627.5 (24.70) |
| Average precipitation days (≥ 1.0 mm) | 11.8 | 9.9 | 8.9 | 8.6 | 8.3 | 8.5 | 7.6 | 8.4 | 8.4 | 10.9 | 11.3 | 11.2 | 113.8 |
| Mean monthly sunshine hours | 60.2 | 80.7 | 128.0 | 181.0 | 213.4 | 209.8 | 221.9 | 206.5 | 152.0 | 117.4 | 69.7 | 52.7 | 1,693.2 |
Source 1: Met Office
Source 2: Starlings Roost Weather

Hampstead - Weather Station in North London. The weather station enclosure is the most elevated of any in the London area, and as a result daytime temperatures are typically one degree lower than Heathrow, Kew, Northolt and Greenwich.

Climate data for Hampstead WMO ID: 99139; coordinates 51°33′38″N 0°10′48″W; elevation: 137 m (449 ft); 1991–2020 normals, extremes 1910–2016
| Month | Jan | Feb | Mar | Apr | May | Jun | Jul | Aug | Sep | Oct | Nov | Dec | Year |
|---|---|---|---|---|---|---|---|---|---|---|---|---|---|
| Record high °C (°F) | 15.7 (60.3) | 18.3 (64.9) | 22.8 (73.0) | 27.2 (81.0) | 30.0 (86.0) | 33.7 (92.7) | 34.4 (93.9) | 37.4 (99.3) | 33.9 (93.0) | 28.9 (84.0) | 20.0 (68.0) | 15.6 (60.1) | 37.4 (99.3) |
| Mean daily maximum °C (°F) | 7.5 (45.5) | 8.1 (46.6) | 10.9 (51.6) | 14.1 (57.4) | 17.3 (63.1) | 20.4 (68.7) | 22.7 (72.9) | 22.3 (72.1) | 19.1 (66.4) | 14.8 (58.6) | 10.6 (51.1) | 7.8 (46.0) | 14.7 (58.5) |
| Daily mean °C (°F) | 4.9 (40.8) | 5.2 (41.4) | 7.3 (45.1) | 9.8 (49.6) | 12.8 (55.0) | 15.8 (60.4) | 18.0 (64.4) | 17.8 (64.0) | 15.1 (59.2) | 11.6 (52.9) | 7.8 (46.0) | 5.3 (41.5) | 10.9 (51.6) |
| Mean daily minimum °C (°F) | 2.3 (36.1) | 2.3 (36.1) | 3.7 (38.7) | 5.5 (41.9) | 8.3 (46.9) | 11.2 (52.2) | 13.3 (55.9) | 13.4 (56.1) | 11.1 (52.0) | 8.3 (46.9) | 5.0 (41.0) | 2.7 (36.9) | 7.3 (45.1) |
| Record low °C (°F) | −12.2 (10.0) | −12.8 (9.0) | −8.9 (16.0) | −5.6 (21.9) | −1.7 (28.9) | 1.7 (35.1) | 4.2 (39.6) | 4.5 (40.1) | 0.6 (33.1) | −3.3 (26.1) | −6.1 (21.0) | −8.4 (16.9) | −12.8 (9.0) |
| Average precipitation mm (inches) | 69.5 (2.74) | 51.4 (2.02) | 42.8 (1.69) | 49.6 (1.95) | 50.5 (1.99) | 58.5 (2.30) | 50.5 (1.99) | 67.7 (2.67) | 59.1 (2.33) | 78.6 (3.09) | 75.7 (2.98) | 68.3 (2.69) | 722.1 (28.43) |
| Average precipitation days (≥ 1.0 mm) | 12.1 | 10.7 | 9.1 | 9.1 | 8.5 | 8.7 | 8.4 | 9.3 | 9.0 | 11.0 | 11.9 | 11.9 | 119.6 |
| Mean monthly sunshine hours | 60.0 | 76.1 | 114.2 | 155.2 | 199.2 | 193.7 | 199.8 | 188.3 | 145.5 | 106.3 | 67.2 | 54.0 | 1,559.4 |
Source 1: Met Office
Source 2: KNMI, Starlings Roost Weather

Northolt - Airfield Weather Station in the North West of London. Temperature extremes range from 37.7 °C (99.9 °F) in August 2003, down to −16.1 °C (3.0 °F) in January 1962.

Climate data for RAF Northolt WMO ID: 03672; coordinates 51°32′55″N 0°25′01″W; elevation: 40 m (131 ft); 1991–2020 normals, extremes 1948–present
| Month | Jan | Feb | Mar | Apr | May | Jun | Jul | Aug | Sep | Oct | Nov | Dec | Year |
|---|---|---|---|---|---|---|---|---|---|---|---|---|---|
| Record high °C (°F) | 16.2 (61.2) | 20.8 (69.4) | 24.1 (75.4) | 28.9 (84.0) | 34.4 (93.9) | 35.0 (95.0) | 40.0 (104.0) | 37.7 (99.9) | 32.7 (90.9) | 29.0 (84.2) | 18.8 (65.8) | 16.8 (62.2) | 40.0 (104.0) |
| Mean daily maximum °C (°F) | 8.2 (46.8) | 8.8 (47.8) | 11.6 (52.9) | 14.8 (58.6) | 18.1 (64.6) | 21.2 (70.2) | 23.5 (74.3) | 23.1 (73.6) | 20.0 (68.0) | 15.6 (60.1) | 11.3 (52.3) | 8.6 (47.5) | 15.4 (59.7) |
| Daily mean °C (°F) | 5.1 (41.2) | 5.4 (41.7) | 7.6 (45.7) | 10.0 (50.0) | 13.2 (55.8) | 16.2 (61.2) | 18.4 (65.1) | 18.1 (64.6) | 15.3 (59.5) | 11.8 (53.2) | 7.9 (46.2) | 5.5 (41.9) | 11.2 (52.2) |
| Mean daily minimum °C (°F) | 2.0 (35.6) | 2.0 (35.6) | 3.5 (38.3) | 5.2 (41.4) | 8.3 (46.9) | 11.3 (52.3) | 13.4 (56.1) | 13.2 (55.8) | 10.6 (51.1) | 7.9 (46.2) | 4.5 (40.1) | 2.3 (36.1) | 7.0 (44.6) |
| Record low °C (°F) | −16.1 (3.0) | −13.9 (7.0) | −8.0 (17.6) | −4.7 (23.5) | −2.7 (27.1) | 0.0 (32.0) | 4.4 (39.9) | 3.0 (37.4) | 0.0 (32.0) | −5.5 (22.1) | −7.5 (18.5) | −17.4 (0.7) | −17.4 (0.7) |
| Average precipitation mm (inches) | 62.9 (2.48) | 49.1 (1.93) | 42.4 (1.67) | 45.6 (1.80) | 51.8 (2.04) | 50.2 (1.98) | 48.6 (1.91) | 56.6 (2.23) | 51.4 (2.02) | 70.2 (2.76) | 71.4 (2.81) | 63.1 (2.48) | 663.3 (26.11) |
| Average precipitation days (≥ 1.0 mm) | 11.6 | 10.1 | 9.1 | 9.4 | 8.6 | 8.6 | 8.1 | 9.4 | 8.5 | 10.7 | 11.6 | 11.3 | 117.0 |
Source 1: Met Office
Source 2: Starlings Roost Weather

Greenwich - Weather Station in South East London located near the river Thames.

Climate data for Greenwich Park, elevation: 47 m (154 ft), 1991–2020 normals, extremes 1948–2004
| Month | Jan | Feb | Mar | Apr | May | Jun | Jul | Aug | Sep | Oct | Nov | Dec | Year |
|---|---|---|---|---|---|---|---|---|---|---|---|---|---|
| Record high °C (°F) | 16.8 (62.2) | 19.7 (67.5) | 23.3 (73.9) | 25.3 (77.5) | 29.0 (84.2) | 34.5 (94.1) | 35.3 (95.5) | 37.5 (99.5) | 30.2 (86.4) | 26.1 (79.0) | 18.9 (66.0) | 16.4 (61.5) | 37.5 (99.5) |
| Mean daily maximum °C (°F) | 8.5 (47.3) | 9.2 (48.6) | 12.1 (53.8) | 15.4 (59.7) | 18.6 (65.5) | 21.4 (70.5) | 23.8 (74.8) | 23.3 (73.9) | 20.3 (68.5) | 15.8 (60.4) | 11.6 (52.9) | 8.9 (48.0) | 15.8 (60.4) |
| Daily mean °C (°F) | 5.9 (42.6) | 6.2 (43.2) | 8.4 (47.1) | 10.7 (51.3) | 13.8 (56.8) | 16.7 (62.1) | 18.8 (65.8) | 18.7 (65.7) | 15.9 (60.6) | 12.4 (54.3) | 8.8 (47.8) | 6.3 (43.3) | 11.9 (53.4) |
| Mean daily minimum °C (°F) | 3.4 (38.1) | 3.2 (37.8) | 4.7 (40.5) | 6.0 (42.8) | 9.1 (48.4) | 12.0 (53.6) | 13.9 (57.0) | 14.1 (57.4) | 11.6 (52.9) | 9.0 (48.2) | 6.1 (43.0) | 3.8 (38.8) | 8.1 (46.6) |
| Record low °C (°F) | −12.7 (9.1) | −9.4 (15.1) | −6.7 (19.9) | −4.8 (23.4) | −1.0 (30.2) | 1.1 (34.0) | 5.0 (41.0) | 5.3 (41.5) | 1.1 (34.0) | −2.1 (28.2) | −8.0 (17.6) | −10.5 (13.1) | −12.7 (9.1) |
| Average precipitation mm (inches) | 43.9 (1.73) | 39.9 (1.57) | 36.5 (1.44) | 38.6 (1.52) | 44.0 (1.73) | 49.3 (1.94) | 36.3 (1.43) | 53.0 (2.09) | 52.4 (2.06) | 58.3 (2.30) | 59.9 (2.36) | 50.7 (2.00) | 562.9 (22.16) |
| Average precipitation days (≥ 1.0 mm) | 10.5 | 9.2 | 7.9 | 8.1 | 7.9 | 7.8 | 7.1 | 8.2 | 7.9 | 10.3 | 10.6 | 10.2 | 105.6 |
| Mean monthly sunshine hours | 44.4 | 66.1 | 109.7 | 152.9 | 198.7 | 198.6 | 209.2 | 198.0 | 140.6 | 99.7 | 58.5 | 50.1 | 1,526.4 |
Source 1: Met Office
Source 2: Starlings Roost Weather

== See also ==
- Agriculture in London
