= Wenlock Basin =

Canal basin in Shoreditch, east London

Coordinates: 51.532349°N 0.095714°W

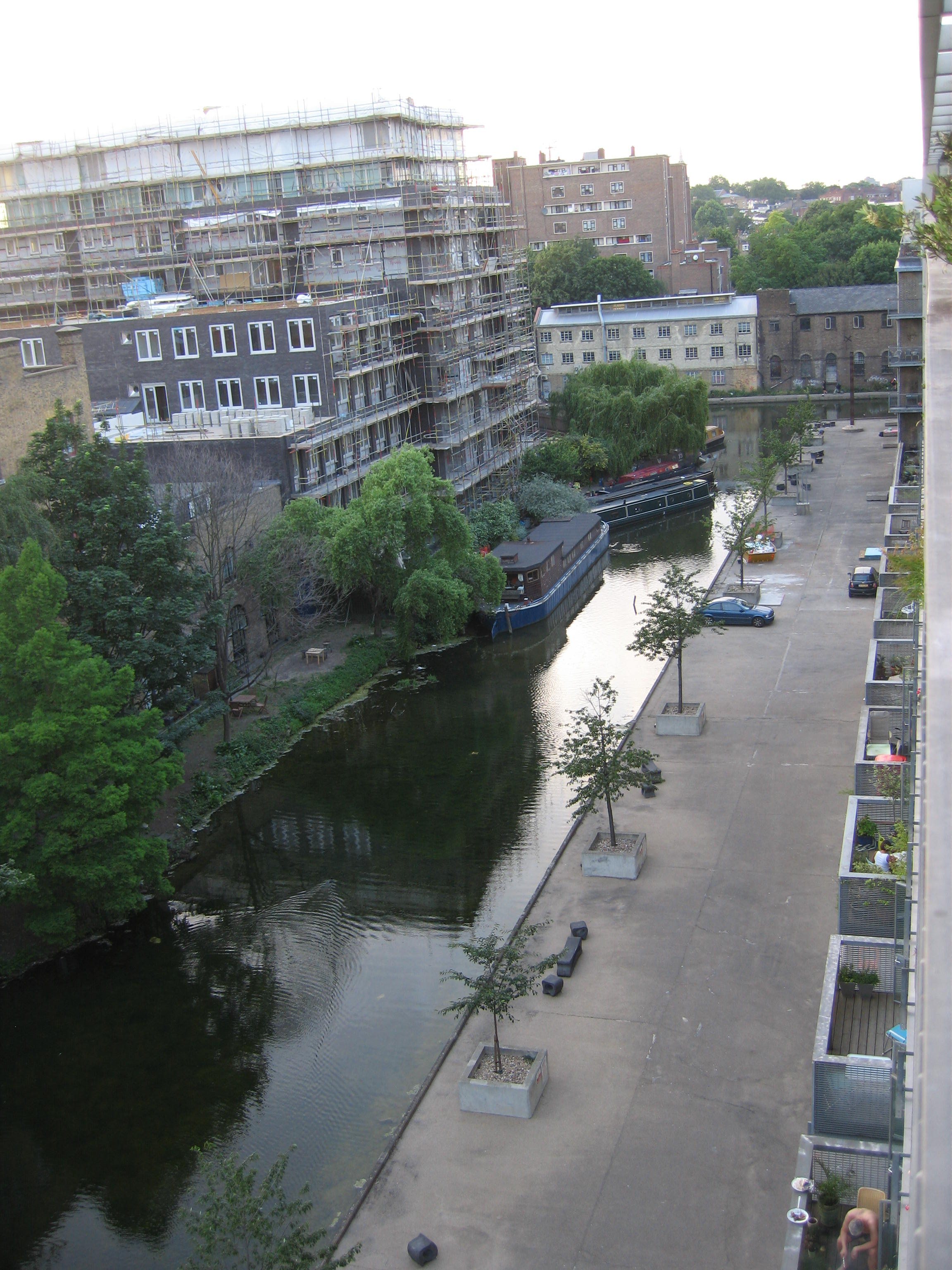
Looking North up Wenlock Basin towards its junction with Regent's Canal, July 2008

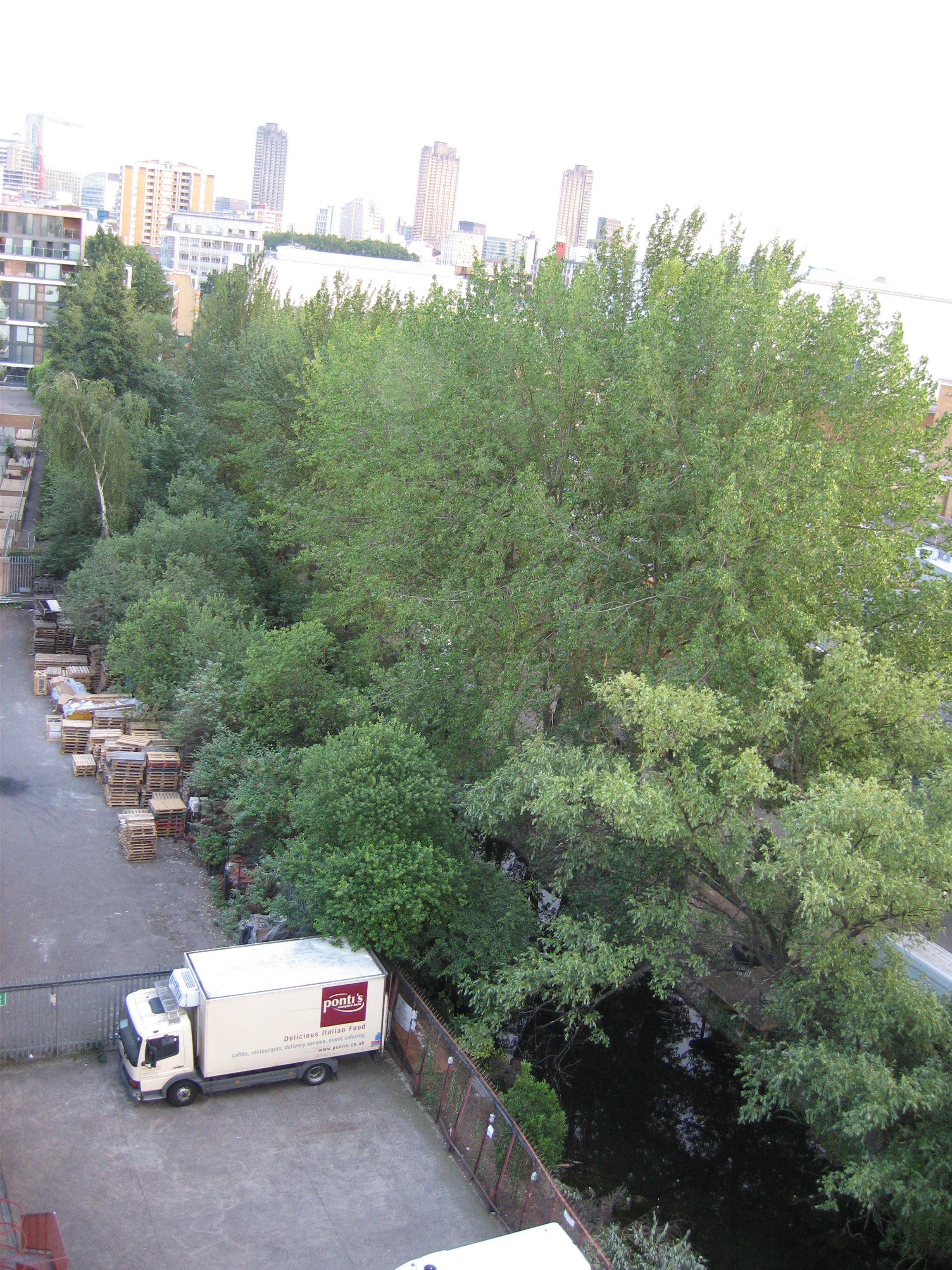
Looking South down Wenlock Basin towards the Barbican Estate towers, July 2008

The Wenlock Basin, is a 320 metre long canal basin on the Regent's Canal, in the Hoxton area of the London Borough of Hackney, United Kingdom. The City Road Basin lies just to the west of Wharf Road and is in the neighbouring London Borough of Islington.

There are private residential moorings at the North end, with their own entrance gate and entryphone on Wharf Road. The basin itself narrows considerably towards the South - and is not deep enough to be navigable by anything other than canoe.

Unlike the Regent's Canal and City Road Basin, Wenlock Basin is not owned or managed by the Canal & River Trust.

== History ==
The basin was constructed in 1826 and is close to the entrance of the Islington Tunnel, where a tug service operated until the 1930s. The opening of the basin went badly wrong, with the cofferdam separating it from the Canal collapsing, prematurely filling the basin and leading to the water level of the canal falling by 13 inches. Traffic on the canal was halted until rainfall could restore the water levels.

The basin took the name of Wenlock Barns, a local farm. The name Wenlock was used by an electoral ward of the former Metropolitan Borough of Shoreditch, it was also, for a time, the name of a ward in the London Borough of Hackney.

A map showing the wards of Shoreditch Metropolitan Borough as they appeared in 1916.

== Residential developments ==
Wenlock Basin is accessible only to residents. The development consists of the following buildings:

- The Royle Building, one of the earliest schemes on the basin, originally the Royle printworks at the junction of the Regent's Canal and Wenlock Basin. Converted to almost 100 loft apartments with a small number of bachelor apartments newly built on the roof during the conversion.
- The Canal Building, next to the Royle Building and extending more directly along Regent's Canal, is an art-deco style warehouse originally refurbished and sold as 79 shells.
- Union Wharf, A development of 90 loft-style apartments and live/work units designed and built by Persimmon Homes (formerly the Beazer Group).
- Estilo, A mixed-use development of 43 one, two and three-bedroom units overlooking Wenlock Basin completed in 2006 by Telford Homes.
- Micawber Wharf, a development of 18 studios, flats and live work/units completed in 2008. Designed by Stephen Davy Peter Smith Architects, and developed by Isotop.
- The Wenlock Building, New mixed use development of 82 units on the west side of the basin at its junction with the Regent's Canal. Design by Johnson Naylor Architects, developed in a joint venture between Londonewcastle and Modern City Living, completed in late 2008.

== Businesses ==
While no longer serving the original cargo handling and warehousing business, a number of modern businesses have office space on Wenlock Basin, either in the ground floor business units of the larger residential developments - or in their own property directly backing on to the basin. They include the Victoria Miro Gallery, a leading British contemporary art gallery in London run by Victoria Miro, and the British Ecological Society, a learned society in the field of Ecology.

== Gallery ==
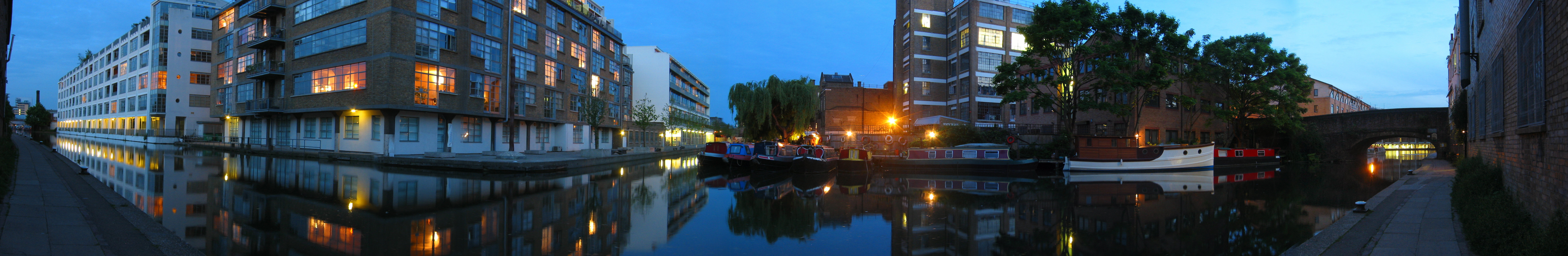

== See also ==
- List of canal basins in the United Kingdom
