= List of canal basins in the United Kingdom =

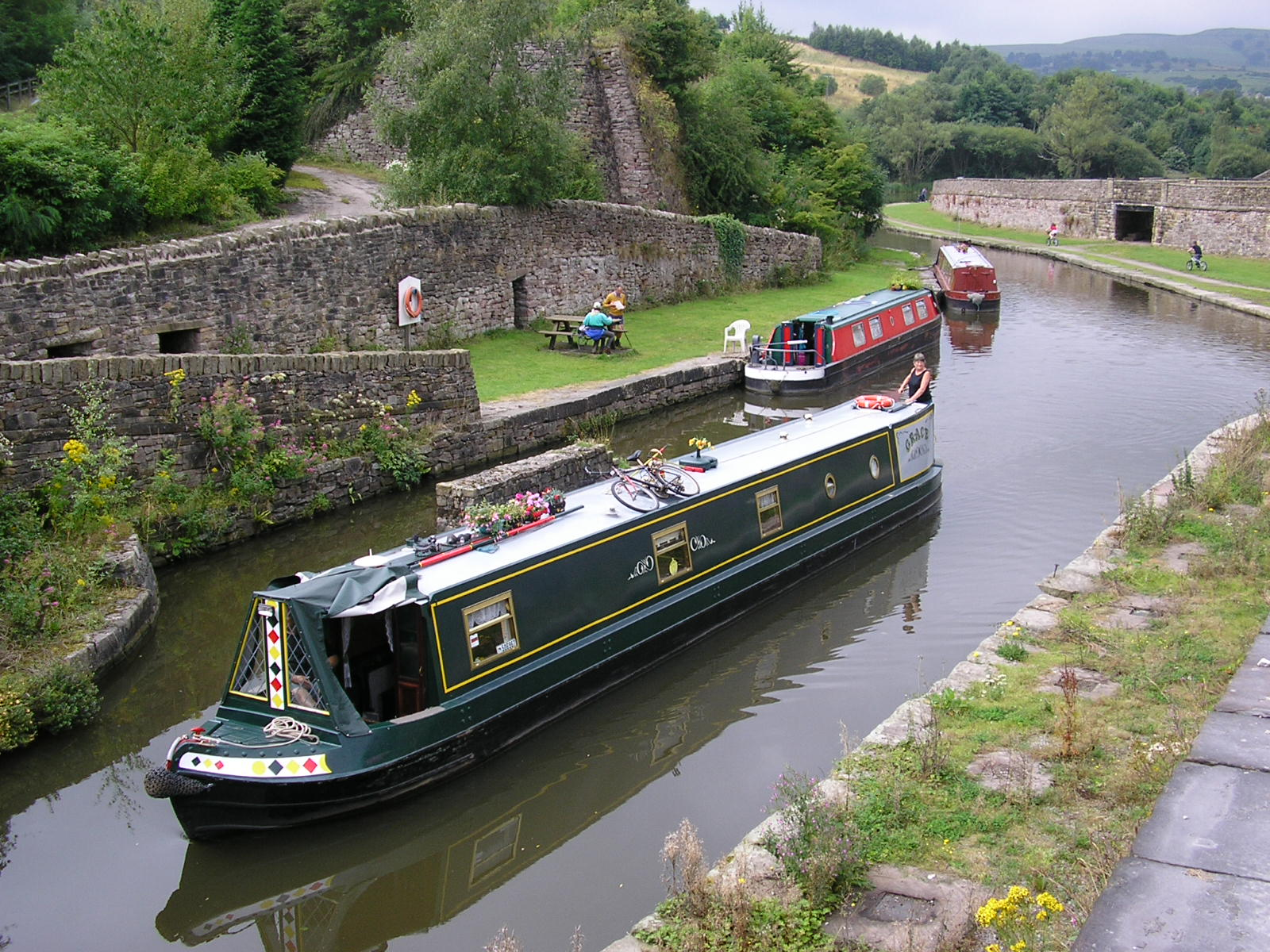
Bugsworth Basin

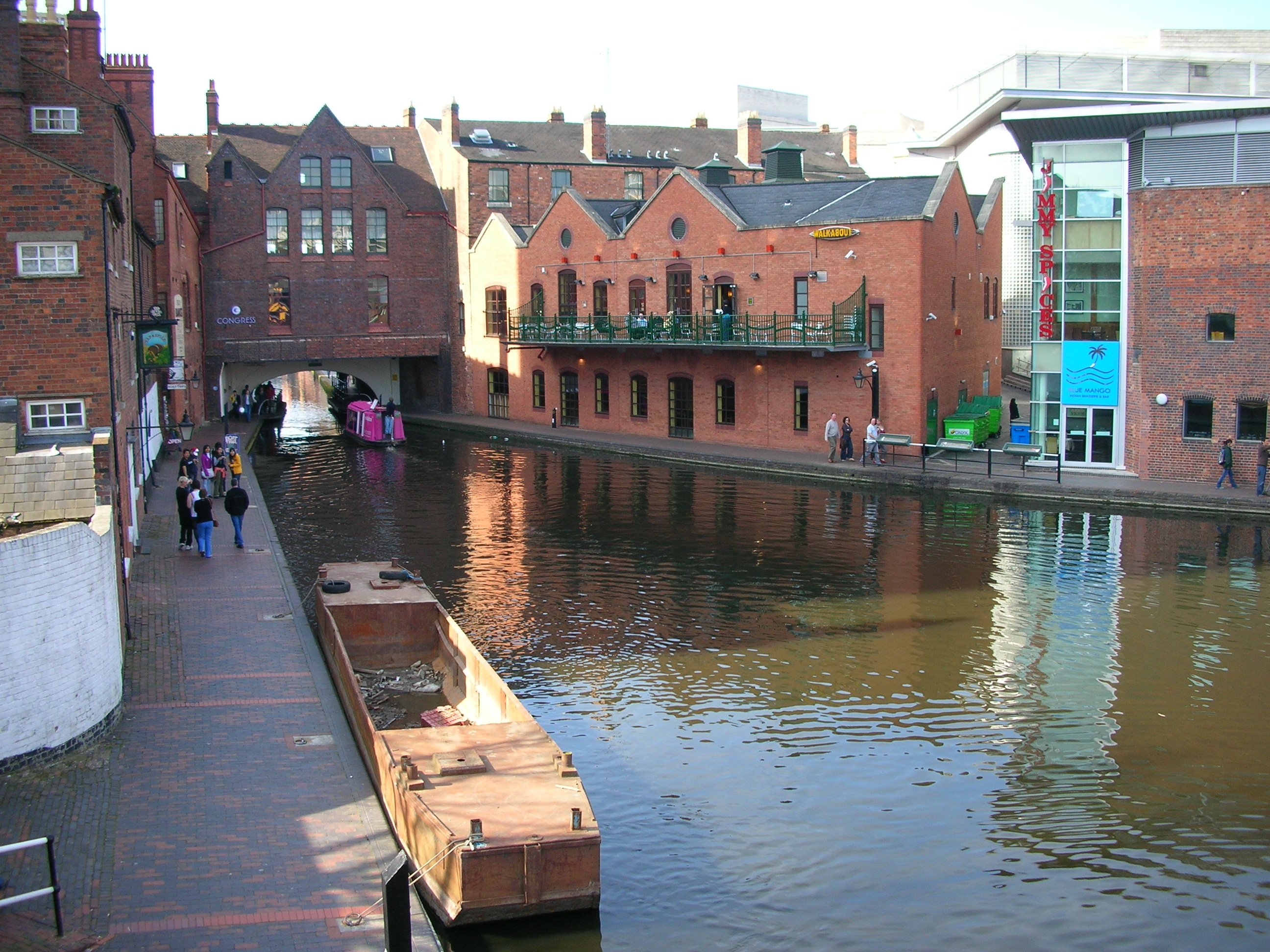
Gas Street Basin

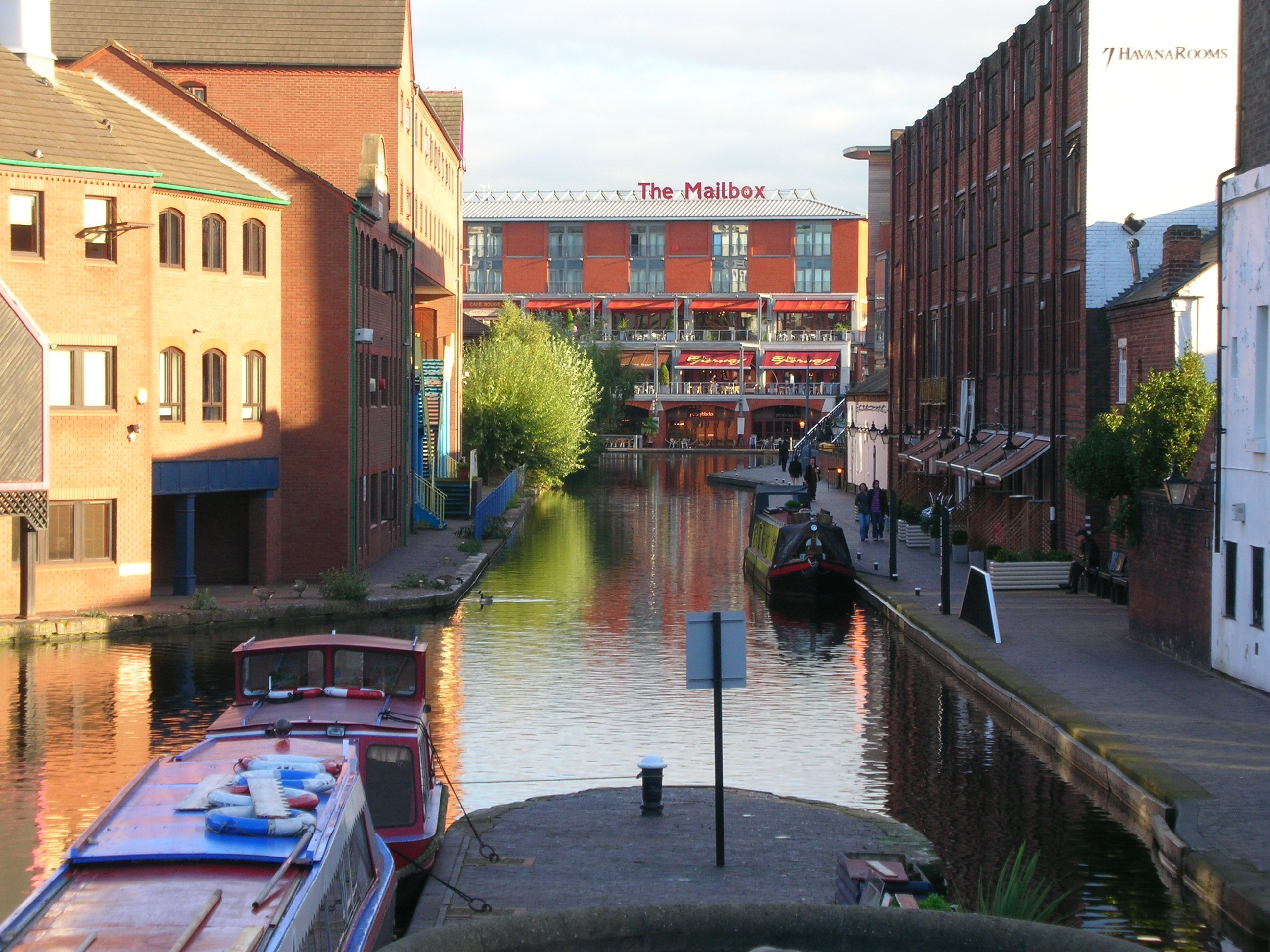
Gas Street Basin

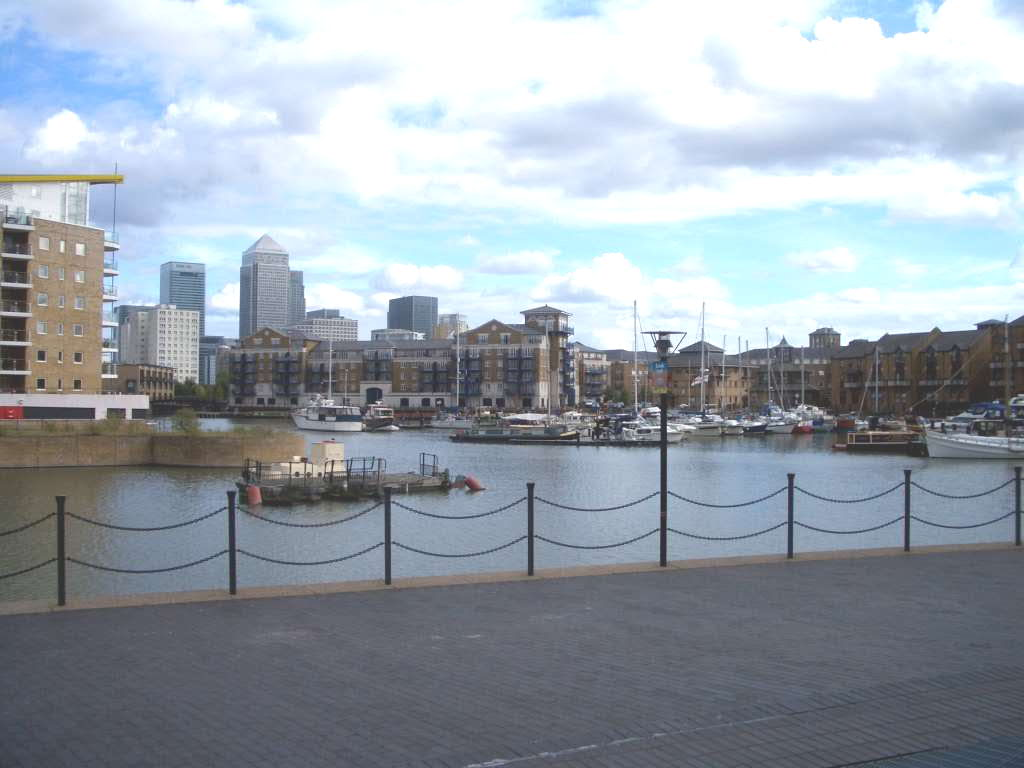
Limehouse Basin

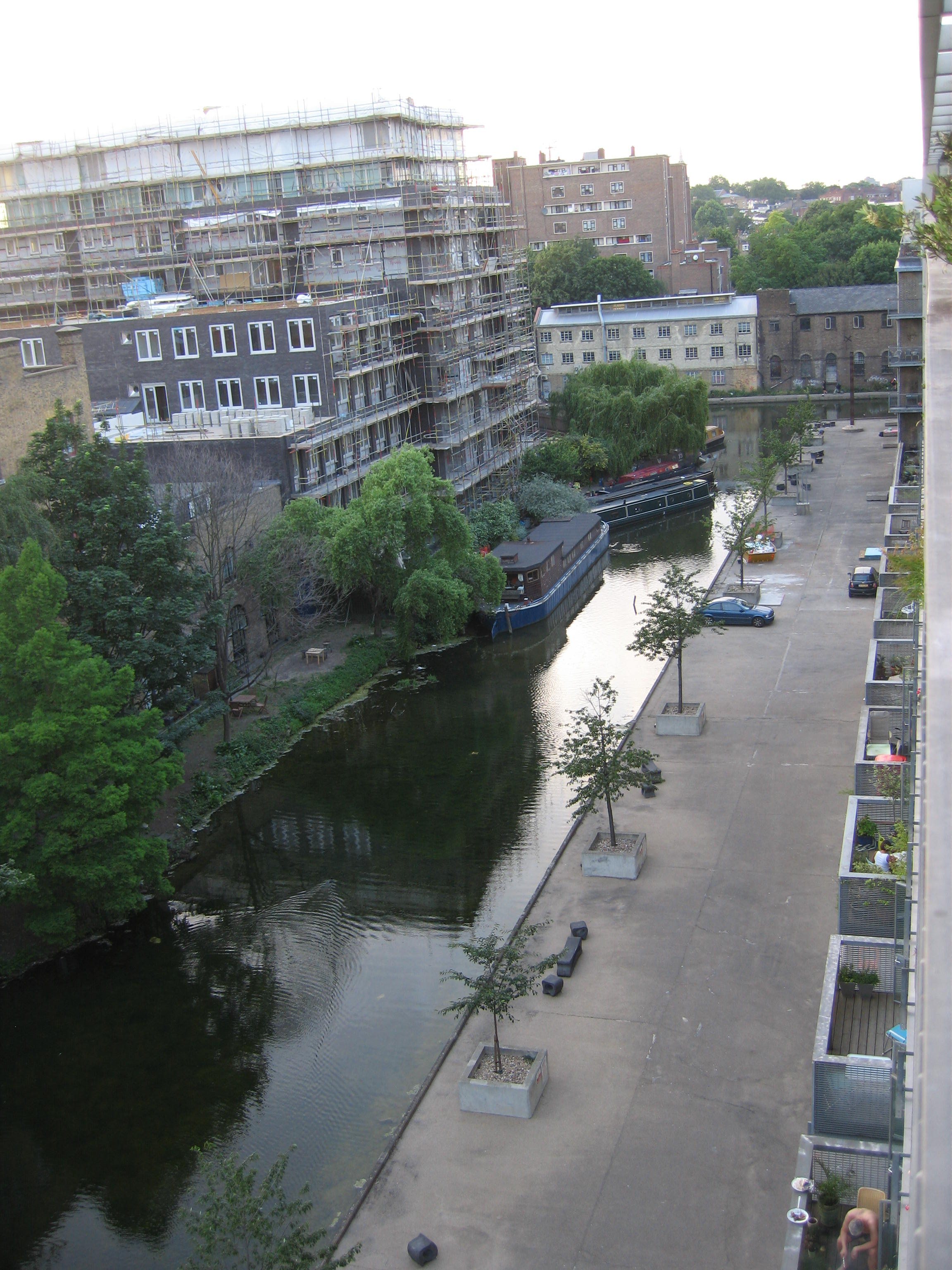
Wenlock Basin

This List of canal basins in the United Kingdom is a list of articles about any canal basin in the United Kingdom.

== Birmingham Canal Navigations ==
- Caggy's Boatyard, Tipton, on the BCN New Main Line
- Gas Street Basin, Birmingham, at the junction of the Worcester and Birmingham Canal and the BCN Main Line
- Tividale Quays Basin, Tipton, on the BCN Old Main Line

== Grand Junction Canal ==
- Paddington Basin

== Peak Forest Canal ==
- Bugsworth Basin

== Regent's Canal ==
- Battlebridge Basin
- City Road Basin
- Cumberland Basin (London) filled in
- Kingsland Basin
- Limehouse Basin
- St Pancras Basin
- Wenlock Basin

== Sheffield and South Yorkshire Navigation ==
- Victoria Quays

== Stourbridge Canal ==
- Stourbridge Basin

== See also ==
- Canals of Great Britain
- List of canal aqueducts in the United Kingdom
- List of canal junctions in the United Kingdom
- List of canal locks in the United Kingdom
- List of canal tunnels in the United Kingdom
- Shadwell Basin and Hermitage Basin, both part of the London Docks
- Mersey Basin Campaign
