= City Road Basin =

Canal basin in London

Coordinates: 51.531140°N 0.097321°W

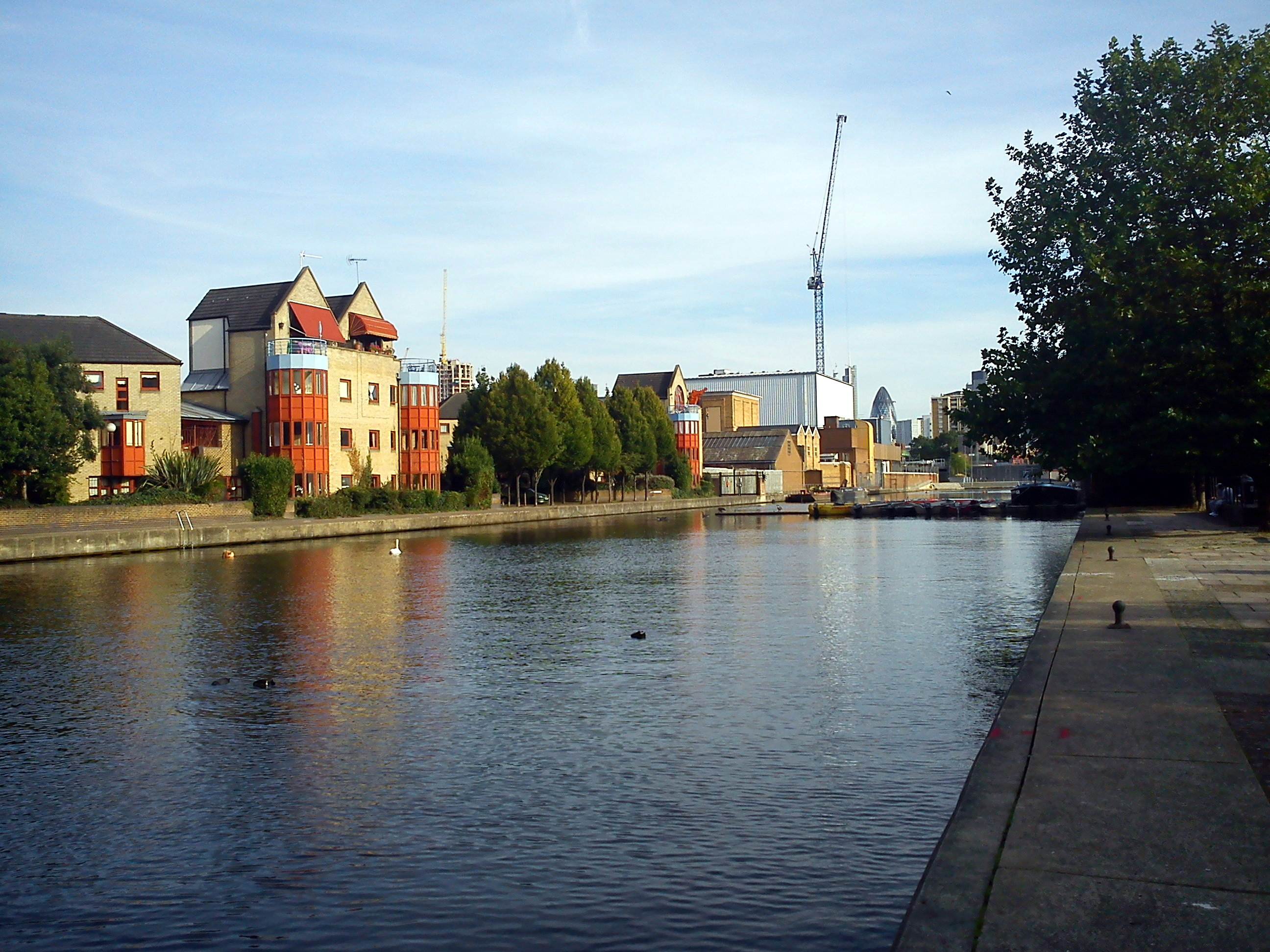
- City Road Basin from Graham Street Park
- Interactive map of City Road Basin

Specifications
- Status: Open
- Navigation authority: Canal & River Trust

History
- Date completed: 1820

The City Road Basin is an English canal basin and part of the Regent's Canal in Central London, owned by the Canal & River Trust. It opened in 1820, and made a large contribution to the prosperity of the Regent's Canal. By the 1950s, its surroundings were largely derelict, but a programme of regeneration began in 2004, involving several large-scale residential developments, and public access to the basin was provided for the first time in 2009. The basin is used for canoeing by the Islington Boat Club.

== History ==
Following the completion of the Grand Junction Canal's branch to Paddington Basin in 1801, various plans to link it to the River Thames further to the east were suggested. A scheme to build a canal to the Thames at Limehouse was eventually agreed, and an act of Parliament was obtained on 13 July 1812 to authorise the Regents Canal. The canal was opened from Paddington to Camden Town in 1816, and work on the Islington Tunnel had started, but the company was chronically short of money, as they had failed to raise the original capital, and the cost of construction was anticipated to be much more than the first estimate of £400,000. A third act of Parliament, (there had been a second one in 1813 to authorise the building of Cumberland Basin), increased the authorised capital to £600,000, but the company had only raised £254,100 of the original amount, and failed to raise any more.

A chance meeting between Charles Munro, the chairman of the Regents Canal prior to 1816 and the long-named Committee of the Society for relieving the Manufacturing Poor led to discussions of government loans, and the Exchequer Bill Loan Commission was created under the provisions of the Public Works Loans Act 1817 (57 Geo. 3. c. 34), with powers to lend money to public schemes which would create employment for those without work. They agreed to lend the canal company £200,000 if they could find another £100,000, which they succeeded in doing, and in December 1817, work resumed on the canal. In 1819, a fourth act was obtained, which made provision for the construction of City Road Basin, and removed powers to build a cut to Shoreditch. Another £105,000 was raised and the canal opened on 1 August 1820. The opening celebrations included the arrival of boats from Manchester, which discharged their cargos at the basin and began their journey back to the north on the same day.

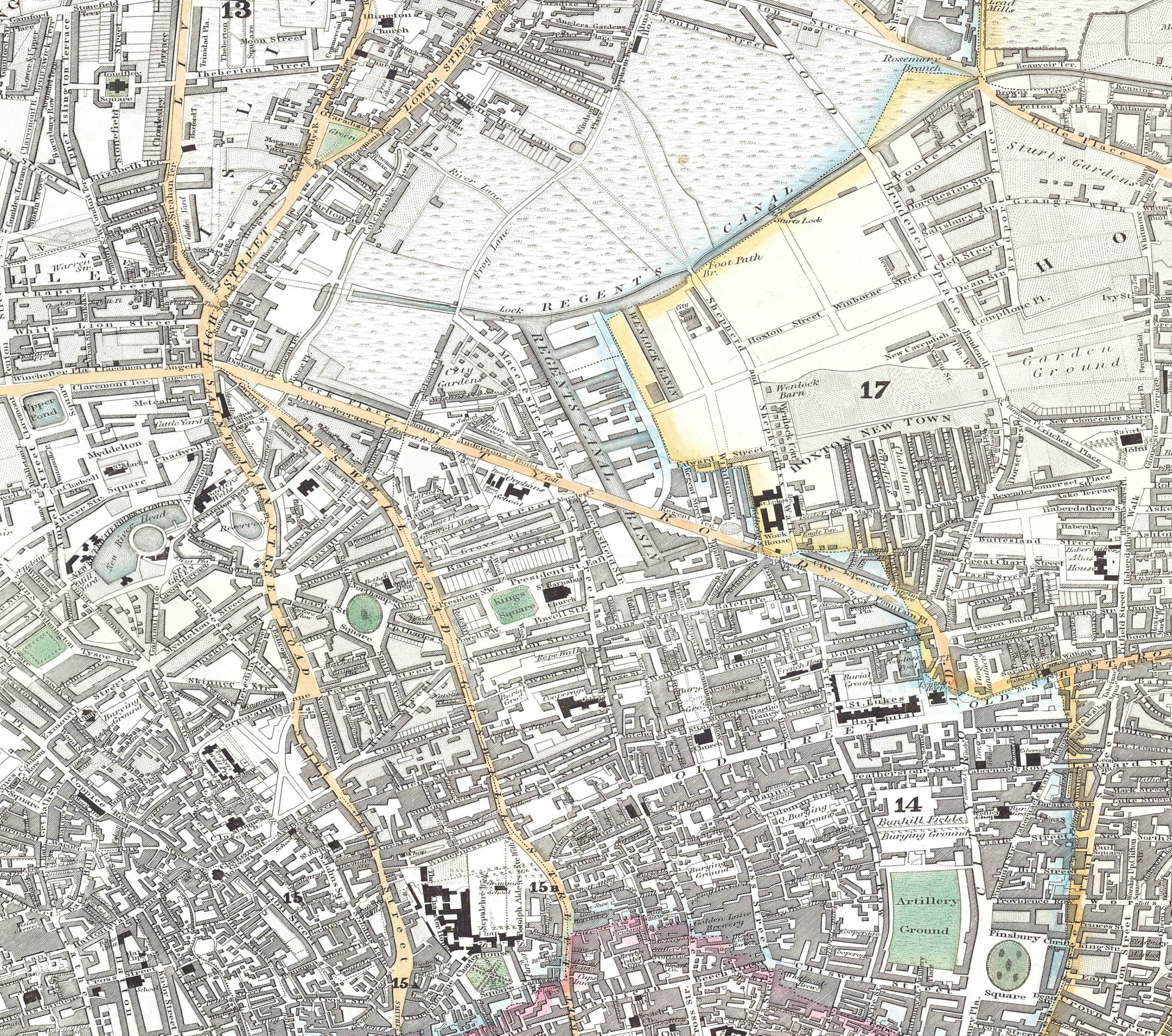
City Basin, on a map from 1827

City Road Basin, close to the eastern end of Islington Tunnel, made a huge contribution to the prosperity of the company, as it was more convenient than Paddington, and was soon acting as a distribution centre for goods into London. Several firms which had become established at Paddington moved to City Road Basin, including the carriers Pickfords. A lucrative trade developed rapidly, and although most of the cargo from the Grand Junction Canal only travelled as far as City Road Basin, there was growing traffic in coal, timber, bricks, sand and other building materials from the eastern end of the canal to locations west of the basin, where building development was flourishing. The privately owned Wenlock Basin was opened in 1826, next to City Road Basin, and passage through the tunnel was speeded up by the provision of a towing boat in 1830. This remained in use until the 1930s, and used a chain on the bottom of the canal, along which it wound its way.

Large volumes of goods were being shipped locally, in contrast to the canal's original purpose of transshipping imports to the Midlands. The opening of the London and Birmingham Railway in 1838 actually increased the tonnage of coal carried by the canal. However, by 1929, with the Midlands trade lost to the railways, and more deliveries made by road, the canal – and this basin – fell into a long decline. It was formally closed by the British Transport Commission Act 1962 (10 & 11 Eliz. 2. c. xlii).

== Development ==
The basin was always private, with no public access, and by the 1950s had become run-down and derelict. In 2004, Islington Borough Council adopted the City Road Basin Masterplan as an official policy, and work began on the regeneration of the area. Major high-rise buildings were built on parts of the surrounding area, and in each case Section 106 planning obligations ensured that there was funding available to carry out environmental improvements to the basin area. This has allowed the public to access the basin for the first time in its history. The work, which was completed in 2009, has included the provision of public open space at the head of the basin, a landscaped park, and new facilities for the Islington Boat Club, who have been providing canoeing facilities for schools on the 3-acre (1.2 ha) basin since 1972.

== See also ==
- Canals of the United Kingdom
- History of the British canal system
- List of canal basins in the United Kingdom

== Bibliography ==
- Baker, T F T; Elrington, C R (1985). A History of the County of Middlesex: Volume 8: Islington and Stoke Newington parishes. Victoria County History. British History Online.
- Hadfield, Charles (1970). The Canals of the East Midlands. David and Charles. ISBN 0-7153-4871-X.
