= Graham Street Park =

Park on Graham Street in Islington, London, England

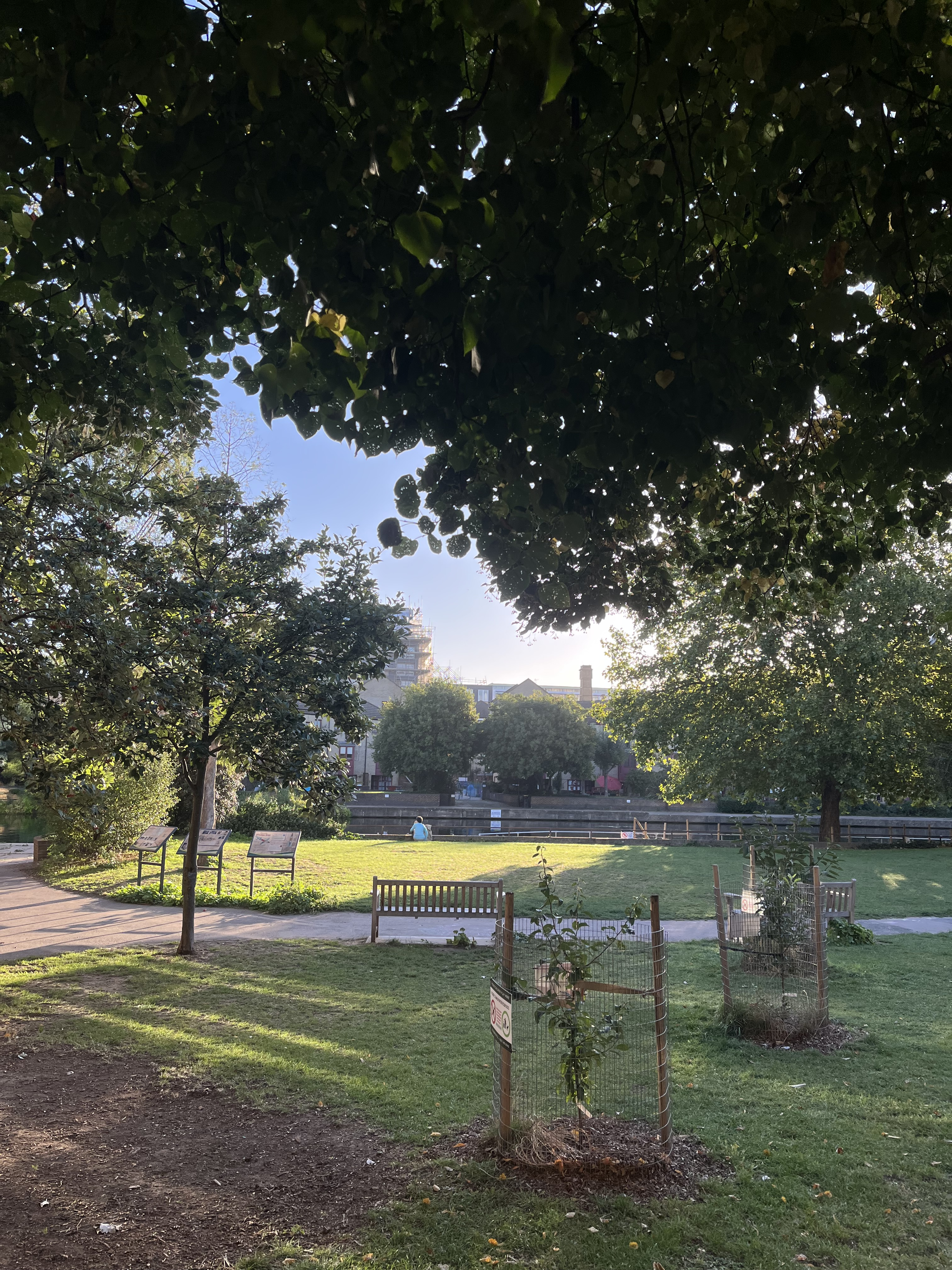
- Interactive map of Graham Street Park
- Type: Urban park
- Location: Graham Street, Islington
- Coordinates: 51.532°N 0.098°W
- Created: late 1980s (original); 2015 (major renovation)
- Operator: Islington Council
- Open: 8 AM - dusk
- Public transit: Old Street; Angel; Essex Road
- Facilities: playground, canal access, cafe

Graham Street Park is a pocket park on City Road Basin in Islington, London, England.

== History ==
=== Industrial origins ===
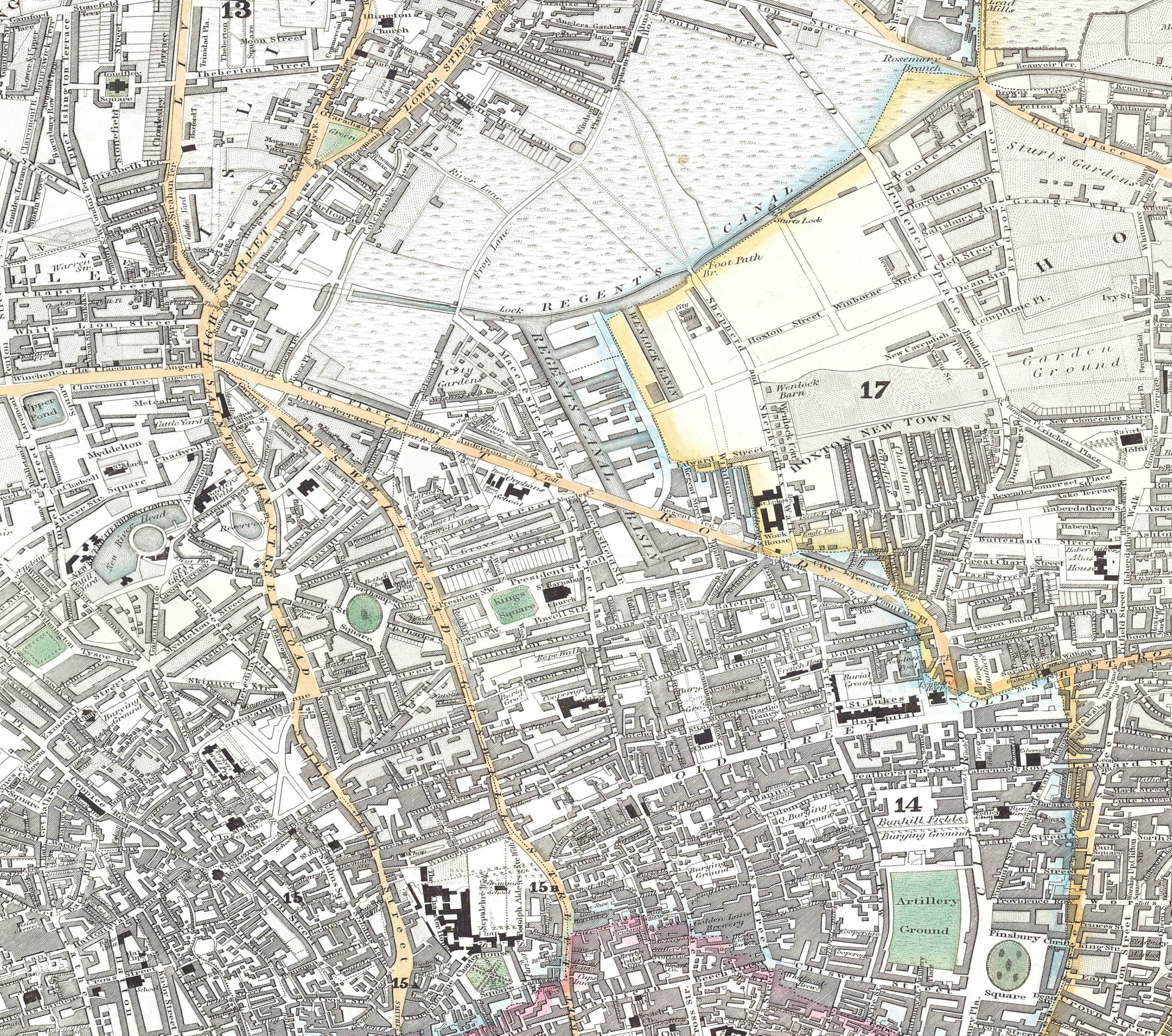
City Road Basin, in 1827

City Road Basin opened in 1820, as part of the development of Regent's Canal, to facilitate moving goods from East to West London. The basin was lined with warehouses for cargo, due to its convenient location close to the eastern end of the Islington Tunnel, as well as central London. In 1909, British Drug Houses built its new, expanded works on Graham Street.

Following the expansion of train lines in the 20th century, the canal (and basin) fell into disuse. This accelerated after the end of World War II, where a number of canal side buildings were hit by bombs, and damaged beyond repair.

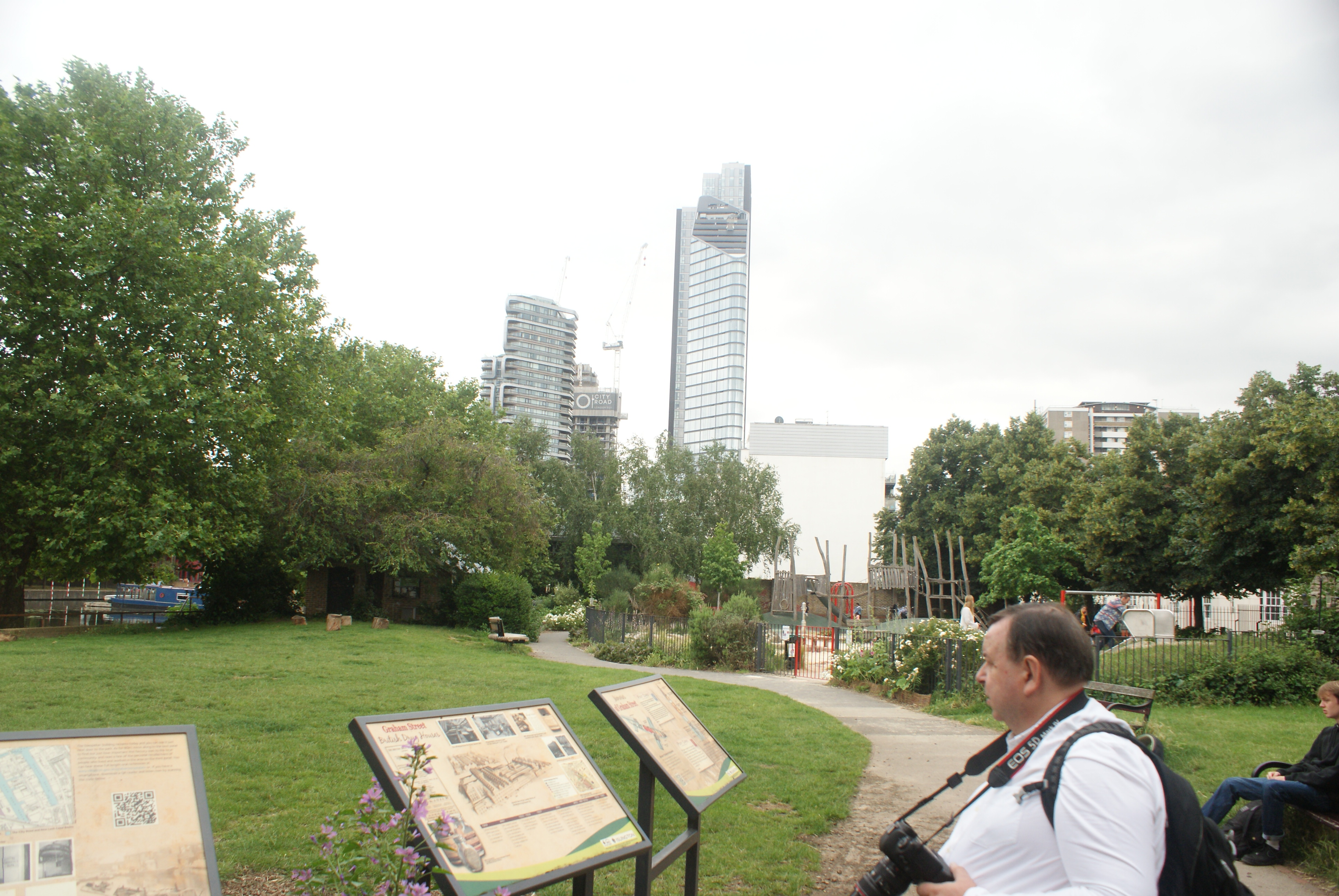
Graham Street in 2021, with Angelgate buildings in background

In the 1970s, the Islington Boating Club was established, and helped fight to maintain the basin, and public access to it.

Graham Street Park was created on cleared land in the late 1980s.

=== Renovation and current projects ===
In 2013, Graham Street Park underwent a major transformation funded by Islington Council, the Mayor of London's Pocket Park Programme, and Transport for London. The renovation included building a new playground, and relandscaping the park to open up perspectives on the Basin. It also brought the park's World War II history to life through heritage interpretation, including historic photographs and QR codes linking to recorded stories from local residents who lived in the area during The Blitz. In 2015, it was reopened to the public, and gained a new support group—Friends of Graham Street (FROGS).

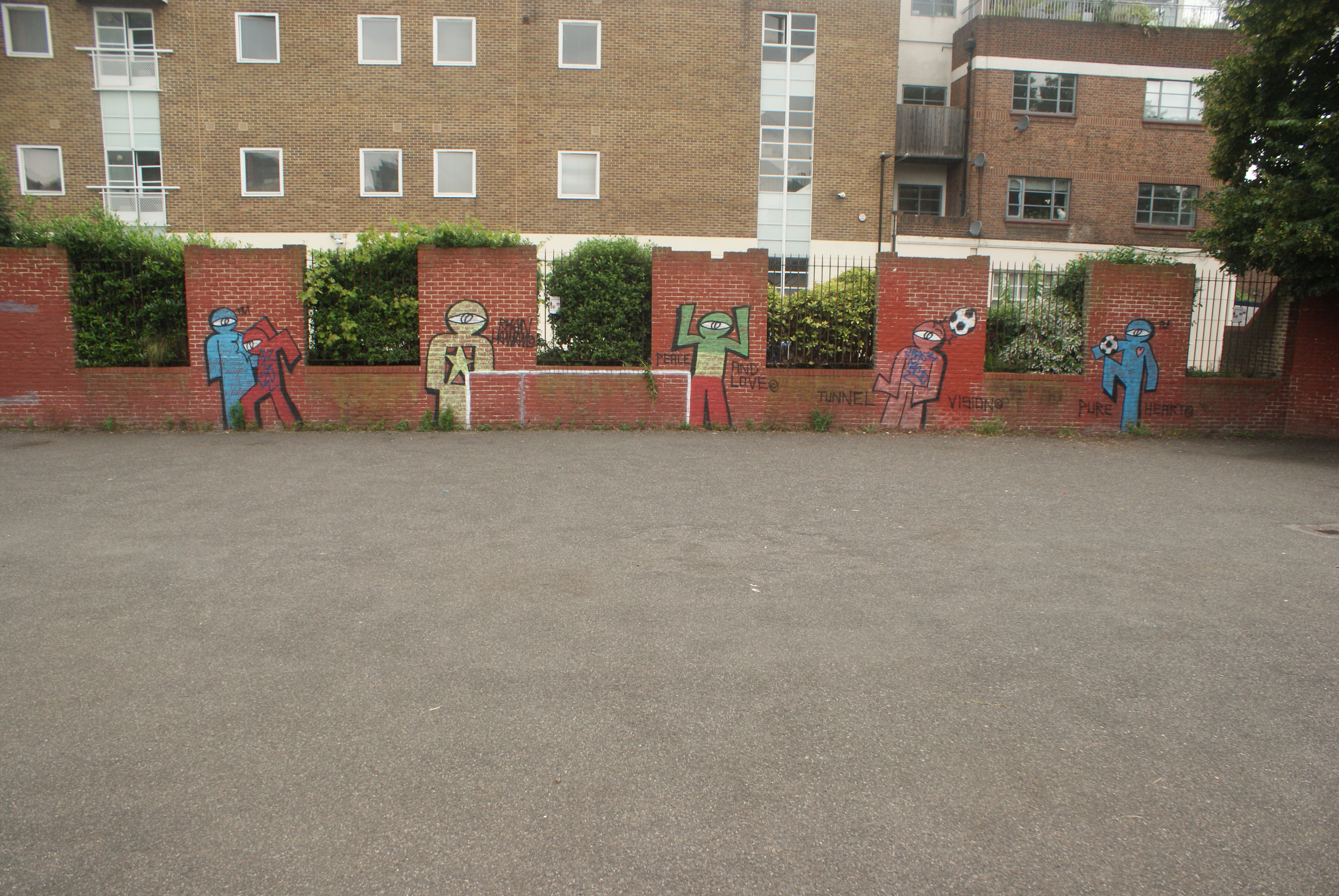
Art in Graham Street park in 2021

The park's concrete play area walls had long attracted street art. In 2022, they received a makeover through a collaboration with Outside the Zone called "Graham Street Paint Jam." Thirteen street and graffiti artists created murals across the walls of the five-a-side pitch area, transforming the previously bland surfaces with various artistic styles ranging from text-based work to abstract designs.

Annually since 1986 (with a few exceptions), the Angel Canal festival takes place around City Road Lock, with a number of boats and stands in Graham Street Park.

In 2025, FROGS helped organize a forest school session for Islington students in a new community orchard opened in the park, in cooperation with Groundwork.

== Amenities ==
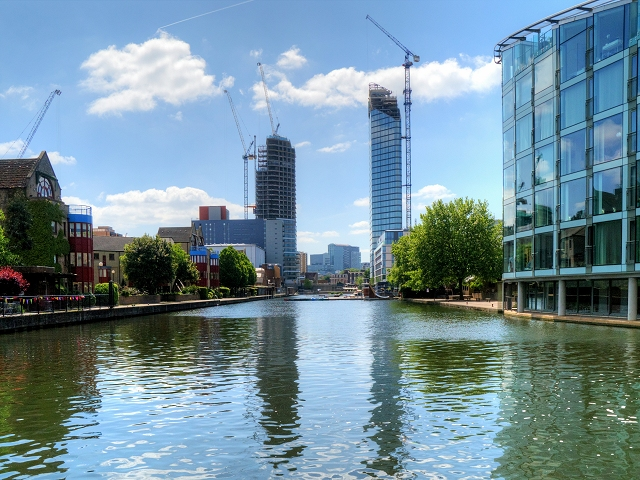
City Road Basin in 2015, with the park on the right

The park looks out on City Road Basin, with seating and a grassy area. The park's playground includes a timber climbing frame, a basket swing, sandpit and toddler play area. The Islington Boating Club has a dedicated space at the southern end of the park.

The park, like all gated Islington Parks, is open from 8 AM to dusk.

In 2019 and 2024, Swim City Basin proposed creating a floating lido in City Road Basin, "in the hope of changing Islington’s status as one of the only London boroughs without an outdoor public swimming facility."

== Award ==
In 2022, the park (and FROGS) won a Green Flag Community Award. The national award is attributed to high-quality green spaces managed by voluntary and community groups. In the same year, the park was also recognized as having one of London's coolest play areas, in the "North" category.
