= Maida Hill Tunnel =

Tunnel on the Regent's Canal, London

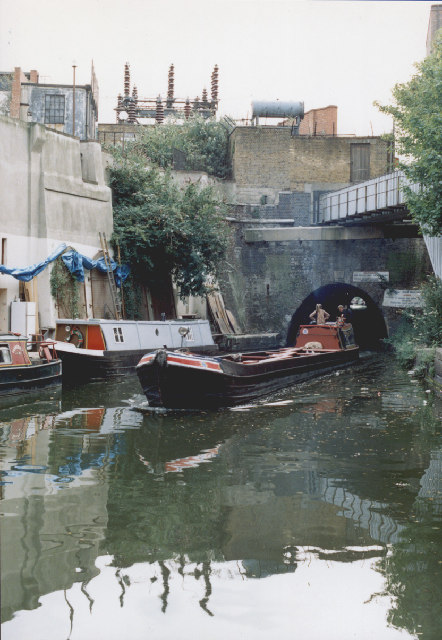
- Eastern portal of the tunnel, August 1989
- Interactive map of Maida Hill Tunnel

Overview
- Location: Maida Vale, St John's Wood, London
- Coordinates: 51°31′30.57″N 0°10′32.74″W
- OS grid reference: TQ267823
- Status: Open
- Waterway: Regent's Canal
- Start: 51°31′28.29″N 0°10′37.38″W
- End: 51°31′33.13″N 0°10′27.25″W

Operation
- Owner: Canal and River Trust

Technical
- Length: 272 yards (249 m)
- Towpath: No

Maida Hill Tunnel is a canal tunnel on the Regent's Canal in London, England. The two other tunnels on the Regent's Canal are Islington Tunnel and Eyre's Tunnel.

== History ==
The Regent's Canal was authorised by the Regent's Canal Act 1812 (52 Geo. 3. c. cxcv) in July 1812. The plans had been drawn up by James Morgan, working as an assistant to the architect John Nash. With some influence from Nash, Morgan secured the post of Engineer, Architect and Land Surveyor for the new company, and oversaw the construction of the canal. However, he had little experience of civil engineering, and so the company advertised for designs for the locks and tunnels. The tunnelling work was awarded to the contractor Daniel Pritchard, who was also responsible for the much longer Grand Union Canal tunnels at Husbands Bosworth and Crick, and went on to become a specialist tunnelling contractor.

The original plans for the canal did not include a tunnel at Maida Hill, but objections to the planned route resulted in one becoming necessary, and subsequent objections to the alignment of the tunnel by a Mr Portman resulted in the short Eyre's Tunnel also needing to be constructed. Work began in 1812, but was hindered when a spring was encountered. Damage caused by the incoming water resulted in casualties among the workmen, and subsequent delays. However, both of the tunnels were completed by 1816, enabling part of the canal to be opened in that year, as far as Camden. Spoil from the excavations was used to level land to the north of the canal, which became the third site of Lord's Cricket Ground. The canal had cut through part of the outfield of the second site.

The tunnel was built without a towpath, and boats were legged through it. In 1825, three men were working a boat through the tunnel when the boards on which they were lying slipped. One man was seriously injured, a second was crushed to death by the barge, and the body of the third was never found. The tunnel is regularly used by trip boats, with the first motor boat, Jasons Trip, starting operation in 1951. In 1953, Evelyn, operated by Lord St Davids, also worked through the tunnel. It was towed by a horse to the east of the tunnel, by a tractor to the west, and human powered through the tunnel. In the 1970s, Westminster City Council decided to build a cafe at the west end of the tunnel. Despite strong local opposition, a concrete and steel raft was constructed over the western portal, and the Cafe Laville was built on it.

== Route ==
The Towpath by C.R.W. Nevinson, 1912

The tunnel lies on a 27-mile (43 km) level section of canal. To the east are Camden Locks, the first three of twelve locks through which the canal descends 96 feet (29 m) to Limehouse Basin, from which Limehouse Lock provides access to the Thames. After passing under the A5205 road bridge, there is a right-angled bend after the locks, with the stub of Cumberland Basin to the left. The route then follows the northern edge of Regent's Park, which houses London Zoo. There is a long wooded cutting, before the canal skirts a housing estate built on the site of the former Marylebone goods yard. It then passes through Eyre's Tunnel, which is often known as Lisson Grove Bridge, and into the eastern portal of Maida Hill Tunnel. The tunnel runs underneath Aberdeen Place on which stands the renowned Crocker's Folly Hotel, so called because it was reputed to have been built in anticipation of the arrival of the railway which went to Marylebone instead. After that it passes beneath Edgware Road to emerge at the western portal with its restaurant above. The section between the tunnel mouth and Little Venice is tree-lined, with fine Regency houses on both sides. There is a junction with the Paddington Arm, leading to Paddington Basin, and the main line of the canal continues westwards to Old Oak Common, where Eurostar trains are stabled, and Wormwood Scrubs park and prison.

The canal through the tunnel is navigable by wide-beam boats, with a beam of 14.5 feet (4.4 m), and a draught of 4 feet (1.2 m). The tunnel has a length of 817 feet (249 m) and headroom of 8.5 feet (2.6 m). The tunnel is 0.4 miles (0.64 km) from Paddington Junction, and 1.9 miles (3.1 km) from Hampstead Road Locks, a pair of locks which begin the fall to the Thames, and home to the Camden Canal Centre. There are a number of trip boats which operate on the section between Little Venice and Camden Locks, passing through the tunnel and calling at the zoo, and the tunnel is only wide enough for one way traffic. Boats are therefore required to give way if another boat is approaching in the opposite direction.

In 2016, the Canal & River Trust provisionally opened access to non-powerfed craft such as kayaks, packrafts and canoes.

== Bibliography ==
- Cumberlidge, Jane (2009). Inland Waterways of Great Britain (8th Ed.). Imray Laurie Norie and Wilson. ISBN 978-1-84623-010-3.
- Nicholson (2006). Nicholson Guides Vol 1: Grand Union, Oxford & the South East. Harper Collins. ISBN 978-0-00-721109-8.
- Skempton, Sir Alec; et al. (2002). A Biographical Dictionary of Civil Engineers in Great Britain and Ireland: Vol 1: 1500 to 1830. Thomas Telford. ISBN 978-0-7277-2939-2.
