= The Towpath =

Painting by C.R.W. Nevinson

- Artist: C.R.W. Nevinson
- Year: 1912
- Type: Oil on canvas, genre painting
- Dimensions: 76.5 cm × 56 cm (30.1 in × 22 in)
- Location: Ashmolean Museum, Oxford

The Towpath is a 1912 oil painting by the British artist C. R. W. Nevinson. It shows a stretch of the Regent's Canal near Marylebone in London as it enters the Maida Hill Tunnel. Nevinson was a noted modernist painter, who became associated with the Futurist movement before the First World War. This painting slightly precedes that phase, reflecting a more general Post-Impressionist style. It was acquired by the Ashmolean Museum in Oxford in 1937 when it was bequeathed by Florence Weldon.

== Bibliography ==
- Eustace, Katharine. Twentieth Century Paintings in the Ashmolean Museum. Ashmolean Museum, 1999.
- Walsh, Michael J.K. Hanging a Rebel: The Life of C.R.W. Nevinson. Lutterworth, 2008.
