= Kingsland Basin =

Canal basin in Hackney, East London

Coordinates: 51.537303°N 0.077989°W

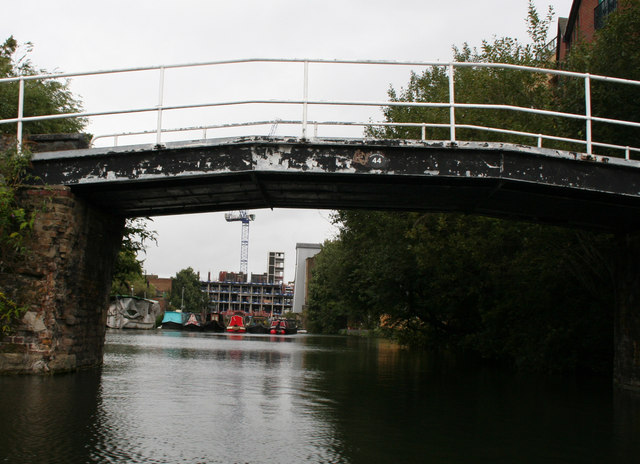
Kingsland Basin

Kingsland Basin is a canal basin in the De Beauvoir Town area of the London Borough of Hackney. The basin, which is also known as Kingsland Road Basin, dates from 1830 and is part of the Regents Canal.

The area is the site of numerous housing redevelopments.

== Canals in Hackney Users Group ==
Kingsland Basin is home to Canals in Hackney Users Group (CHUG), a local charity. Founded in 1983, it was set up to 'promote use of the canal in Hackney'. In the early 1980s a Hackney Council grant to generate affordable housing enabled the dredging of the abandoned basin, and the setting up of moorings for residential boats.

CHUGʼs key activities over the last three decades focused on educating about the canal and its environmental and historical facets, and advocating its use by working with schools and local organisations. CHUG actively improved the canal environment, and campaigned for sustainable development around the basin. CHUG works with the Laburnum Boat Club, which uses the basin as a training space. CHUG supports LBC with resources and funds for sporting activities.

CHUG still manages and maintains the moorings. The self-managed moorings, unique in the UK, provide affordable residential moorings in central London. The redevelopment of Kingsland Basin may affect CHUG's ability to do this in the future.

== See also ==
- Canals of the United Kingdom
- History of the British canal system
- List of canal basins in the United Kingdom
