= Eyre's Tunnel =

Tunnel on the Regent's Canal, London

Coordinates: 51.5263°N 0.1716°W

Lisson Grove (Eyre's) Tunnel
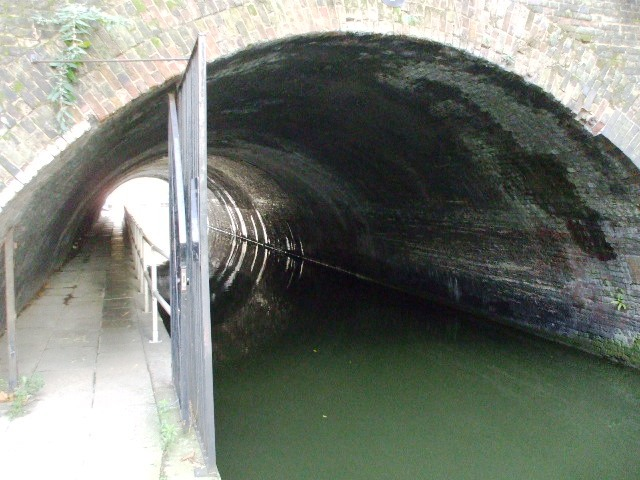
- Lisson Grove (Eyre's) Tunnel

Overview
- Location: St John's Wood London
- Status: Open
- Waterway: Regent's Canal

Operation
- Opened: 1816
- Owner: Canal and River Trust

Technical
- Length: 48 m
- Towpath: Yes

Eyre's tunnel or Lisson Grove Tunnel is a short canal tunnel on the Regent's Canal that passes under Lisson Grove in St John's Wood, Westminster and opened in 1816. It is only 48 metres long. The two other tunnels on the Regent's Canal are Islington Tunnel and Maida Hill Tunnel. Unlike the other tunnels, Eyre's Tunnel has a (now fenced) towpath.

The tunnel was originally known as Eyre's Tunnel due to its passing beneath land belonging to Richard Eyre, a local landowner. Lisson Grove is a more recent usage clearly following the renaming of the road that passes above the tunnel.
