= Cumberland Basin (London) =

Canal basin in London, England

Coordinates: 51.5302°N 0.1425°W

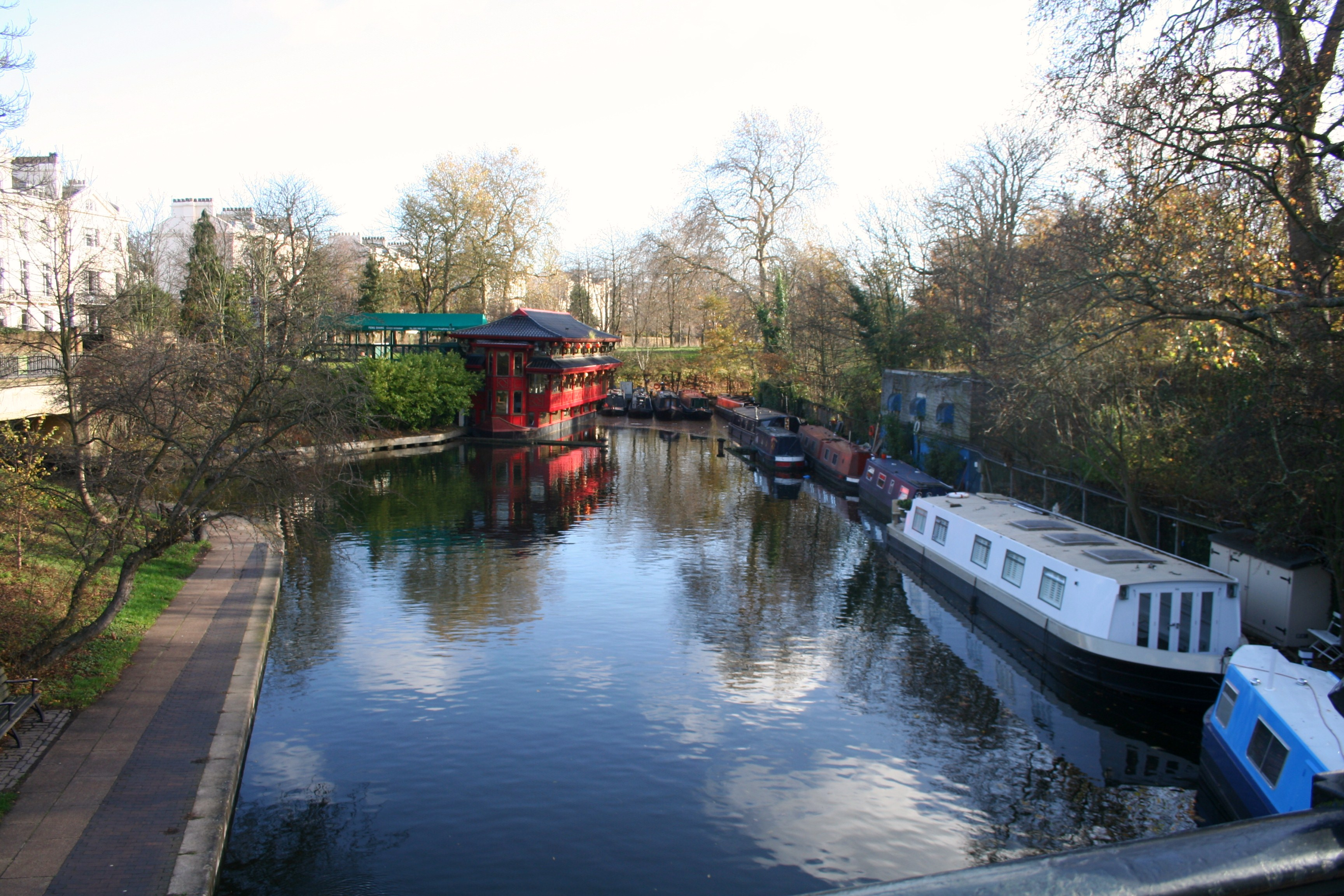
As the Regent's Canal turns left towards Camden Town, the remains of the Cumberland Basin arm lie straight ahead.

Cumberland Basin (or Cumberland Market Basin) was a canal basin near Euston railway station in London, England and a part of the Regent's Canal. It was originally known as Jew's Harp Basin in the 1880s, after a nearby public house.

The basin's excavation was authorised in 1813 to serve Cumberland Market and the then-industrial "New Road", and in 1941–2 the basin was filled back in, chiefly using rubble from the London Blitz.

== Cumberland Arm ==
The Cumberland Arm (or Cumberland Market Branch) was a 1-kilometre (0.6 mi) long stretch of canal that connected Cumberland Basin to the Regent's Canal (which passes through the present site of the car park for London Zoo). The Cumberland Turn junction with the Regent's Canal is still visible with the short stub-end of the arm remaining housing the Feng Shang Floating Restaurant.

In the 1880s, when American writer Ellis Martin was touring the London canals, he chose not to enter the basin as an 1850s report had described it as "no better than a stagnant putrid ditch", and noted that cholera had spread amongst nearby neighbourhoods and boat-dwellers.

The basin and associated works were authorised in 1813 to serve Cumberland Market and New Road (now Euston Road), and closed in 1942.

The basin was dammed off in August 1938, and during the Blitz, the arm was used to supply water to fire pumps attending fires in the West End. By 1941, the arm and basin had been filled in with rubble from demolished buildings.

== Historical remains ==
Starting after World War I, sections of the area around the Cumberland Market were used by the Crown Estate to develop housing for war veterans. Eventually, the land right beside the Cumberland Basin was included in these allotments for the Cumberland Market Estate. Some street lamps associated with the basin remain on Gloucester Gate Bridge above the Main Line of the Regent's Canal just west of Cumberland Turn.
