= Islington Tunnel =

Tunnel on the Regent's Canal, London

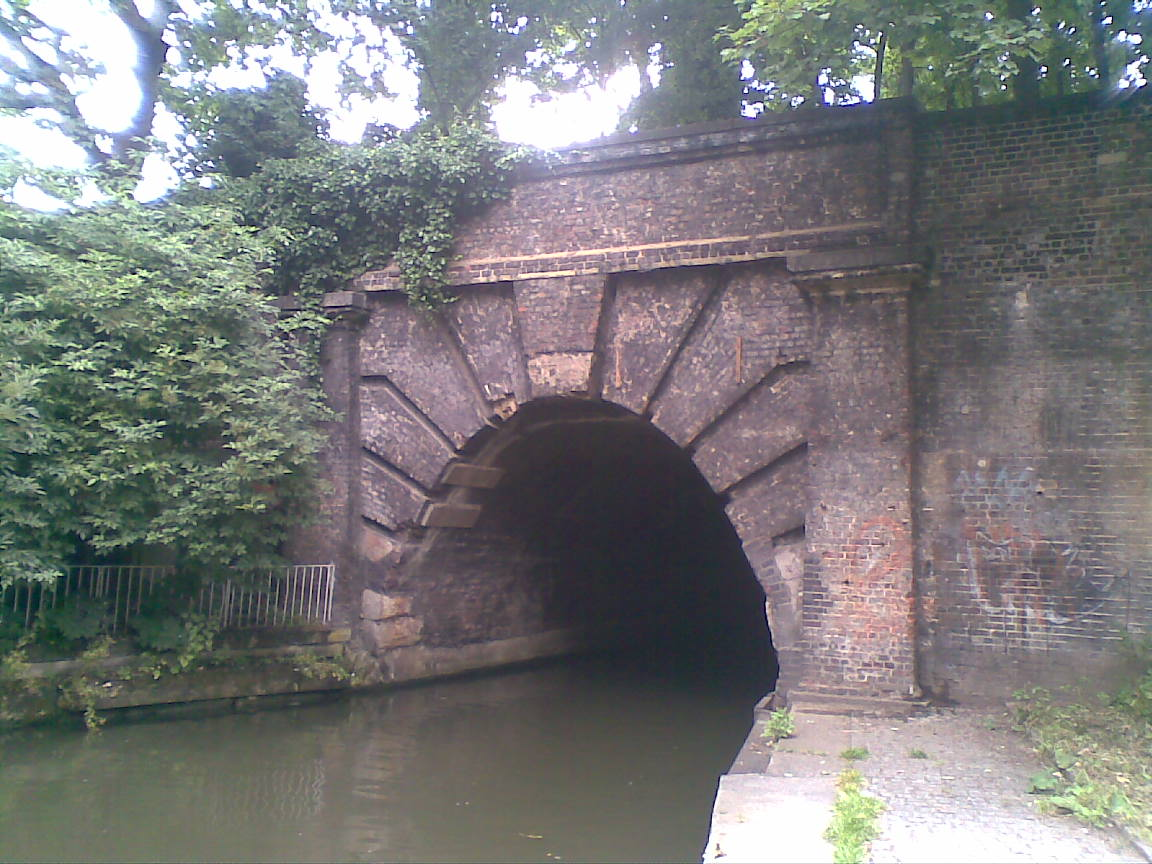
- Eastern portal
- Interactive map of Islington Tunnel

Overview
- Location: Islington, London, England
- Coordinates: 51°32′2.8″N 0°6′31.18″W
- OS grid reference: TQ312833
- Status: Open
- Waterway: Regent's Canal
- Start: 51°31′59.37″N 0°6′9.67″W
- End: 51°32′5.12″N 0°6′54.07″W

Operation
- Opened: 1818
- Owner: Canal & River Trust

Technical
- Design engineer: James Morgan
- Length: 960 yards (878 m)
- Towpath: No
- Boat-passable: Yes

The Islington Tunnel takes the Regent's Canal 960 yards (878 m) under Islington, as the longest such tunnel in London. The way for short boats and barges only opened in 1818; the pavements above are waymarked so the otherwise discontinued towpaths are connected. The canal's Eyre's and Maida Hill Tunnels, to the west, are much shorter.

== History ==
Islington Tunnel opened in 1818 and was built by the engineer James Morgan.

The Regent's Canal was authorised by an act of Parliament, the Regent's Canal Act 1812 (52 Geo. 3. c. cxcv) on 13 July 1812, and a month later James Morgan, who had previously produced plans and sections to support the application, was appointed as Engineer, Architect and Land Surveyor for the scheme. At the time, Morgan had little civil engineering experience, and the company decided to hold a competition for the design of the locks and tunnels, with the entries to be assessed by William Jessop and two other engineers. Although entries hoping to win the 50-guinea (£52.50) were submitted, none were accepted, and in December Morgan became responsible for the whole project.

The company was persistently short of money, as it had only succeeded in raising £254,100 of the estimated cost of £400,000, and as work progressed, it became obvious that more would be needed. The first section from Paddington Basin to Camden was opened on 12 August 1816, and some work had been done on the tunnel, but work stopped, as there was no more money. Another act of Parliament, the Regent's Canal Act 1816 (56 Geo. 3. c. lxxxv), increased the authorised capital to £600,000, but the company had no success in raising any more. However, a chance meeting between the former chairman, Charles Munro, and the committee for the Society for the Relieving of the Manufacturing Poor resulted in discussions about government loans funding the project and providing employment for the poor. The Exchequer Bill Loan Commission was set up under the powers of the Public Works Loans Act 1817 (57 Geo. 3. c. 34), with commissioners given powers to award loans to public projects which would provide employment for those without work. The engineer Thomas Telford surveyed the unfinished canal and tunnel on behalf of the Commissioners, and an initial loan of £200,000 was promised, providing that the canal company could raise £100,000 in match funding. This they succeeded in doing, and work resumed in December 1817. The canal opened in its entirety on 1 August 1820.

The tunnelling contract was given to Daniel Pritchard, who had previous experience building tunnels for the Grand Union Canal at Husbands Bosworth and Crick. The first was built between 1811 and 1813, and was 1,170 yards (1,070 m) long, while the second was built between 1812 and 1814, and was 1,528 yards (1,397 m) long. They had been completed despite encountering difficult geology along their routes. With the completion of the 960-yard (878 m) Islington Tunnel and the nearby Maida Hill Tunnel, he went on to be a specialist tunnelling contractor, completing the Strood Tunnel on the Thames and Medway Canal and the second Harecastle Tunnel on the Trent and Mersey Canal.

Lacking towpath, barges originally had to be legged through the tunnel. In 1826 it was upgraded with a steam tug pulling a guiding chain above the centre of the bed which would propel the barges; which remained until the 1930s, when it was replaced with a diesel engine, now defunct due to boats' motor propulsion.

== Route ==
There is no towpath. Walkers or cyclists wishing to follow the tunnel are helped by a trail of waymarkers which have been set into the pavements above. From the eastern portal heading towards the west, the trail runs up Duncan Street, then left down Islington High Street to the crossing near Angel Underground Station, across High Street and up Liverpool Road, turning left into Chapel Market. At the end of Chapel Market it turns right into Penton Street, and finally left into Maygood Street. At the end of Maygood Street it passes through a small residential zone, before ultimately ending in Muriel Street, from where the towpath may be accessed.

== Gallery ==
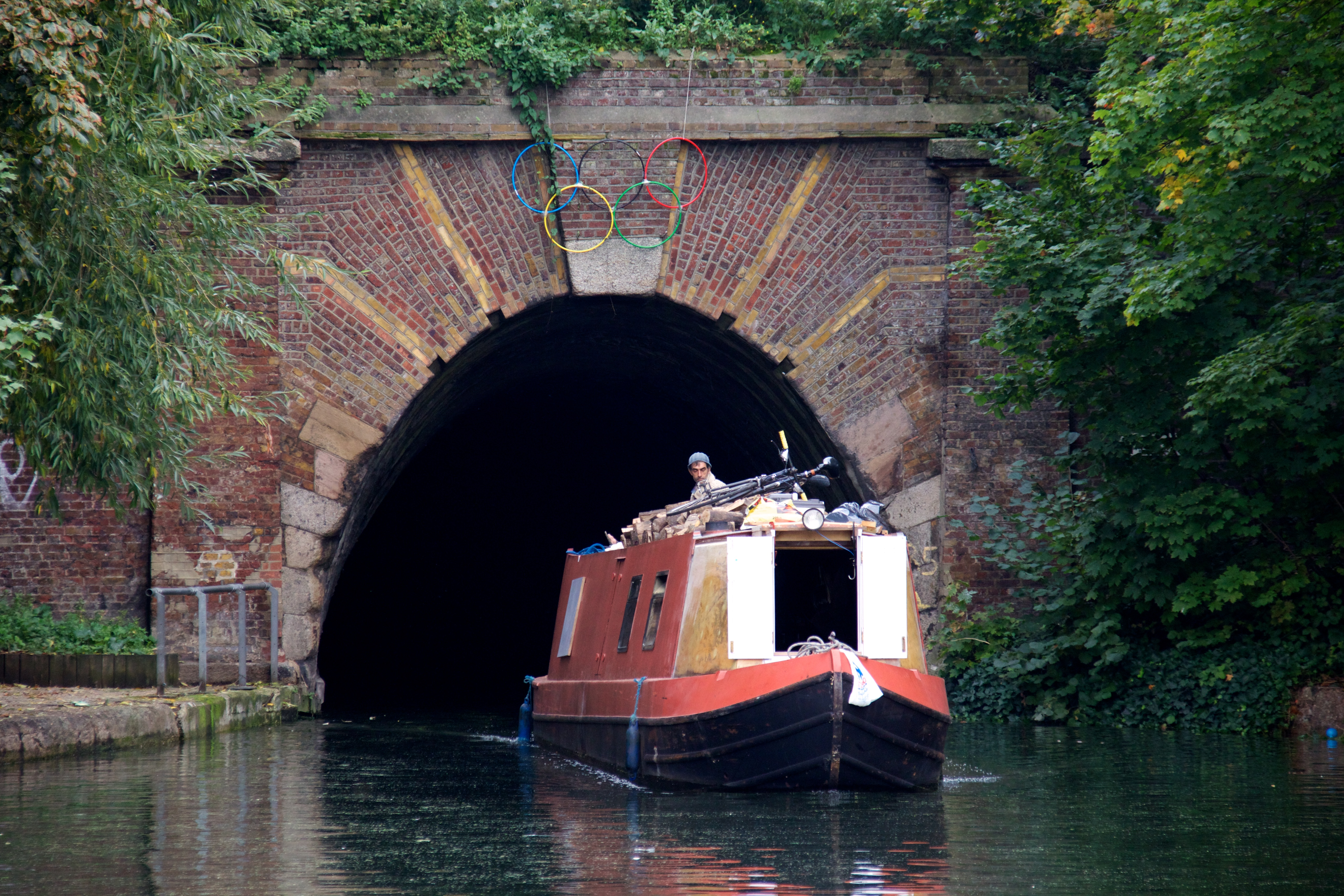
Western Portal

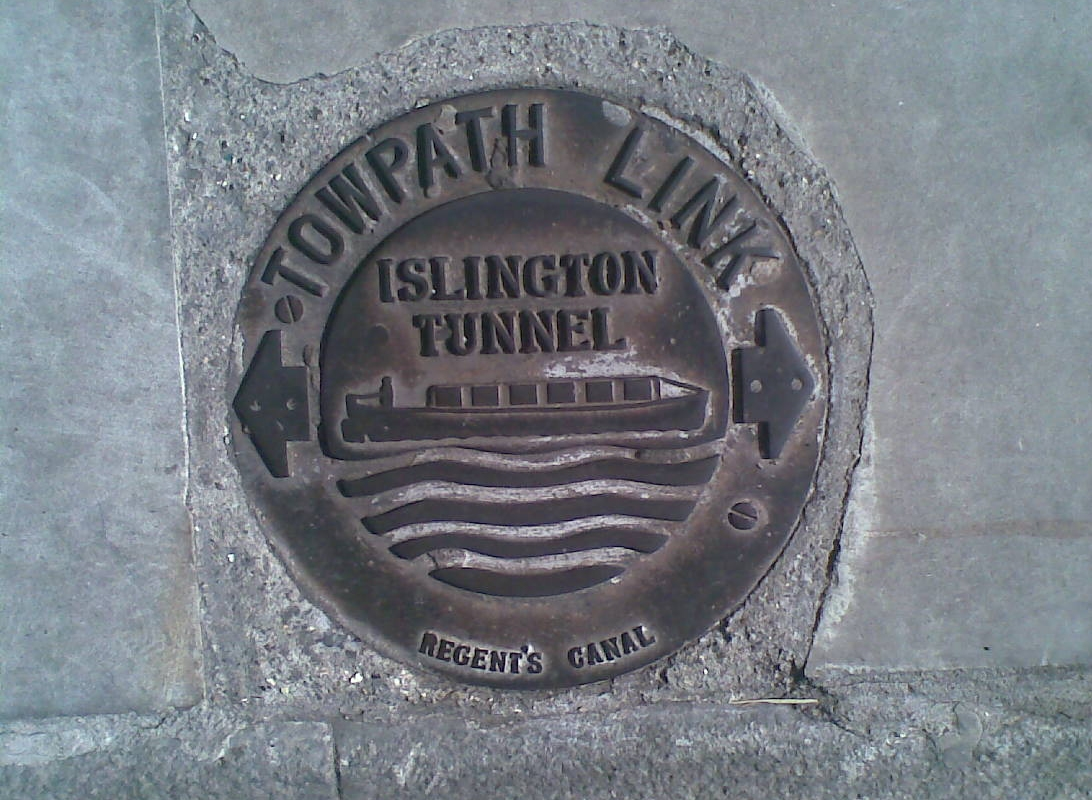
Older style waymarker

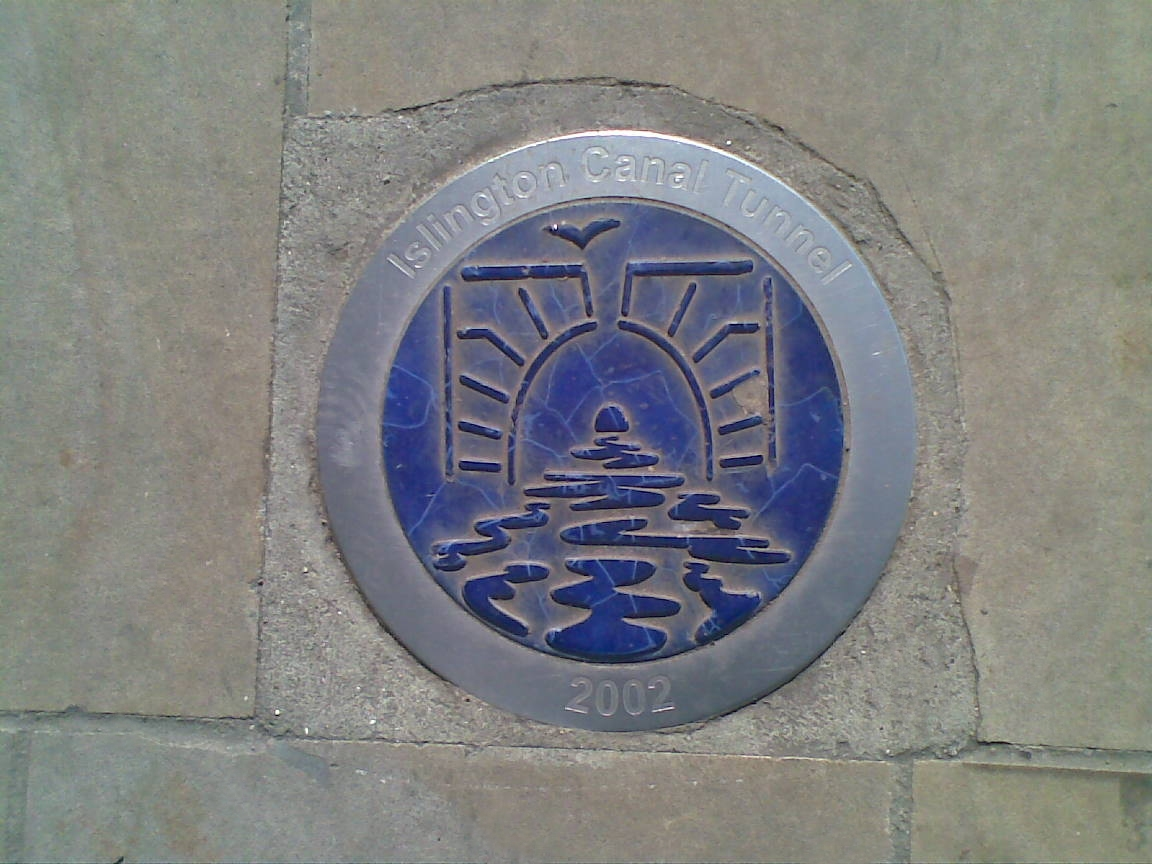
Modern style waymarker

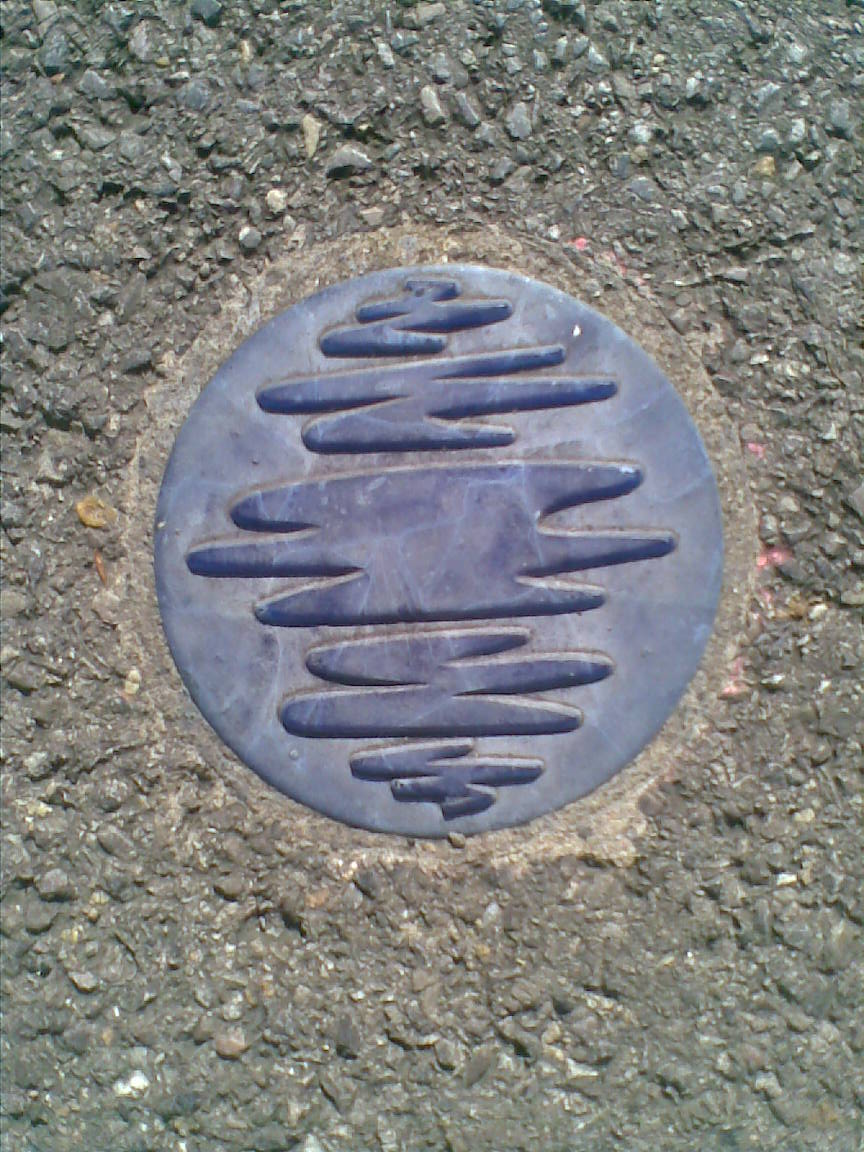
Smaller waymarker

== See also ==
- Canals of the United Kingdom
- History of the British canal system

== Bibliography ==
- Skempton, Sir Alec; et al. (2002). A Biographical Dictionary of Civil Engineers in Great Britain and Ireland: Vol 1: 1500 to 1830. Thomas Telford. ISBN 0-7277-2939-X.
- Hadfield, Charles (1970). The Canals of the East Midlands. David and Charles. ISBN 0-7153-4871-X.
