= Canal basin =

Waterway alongside or at the end of a canal

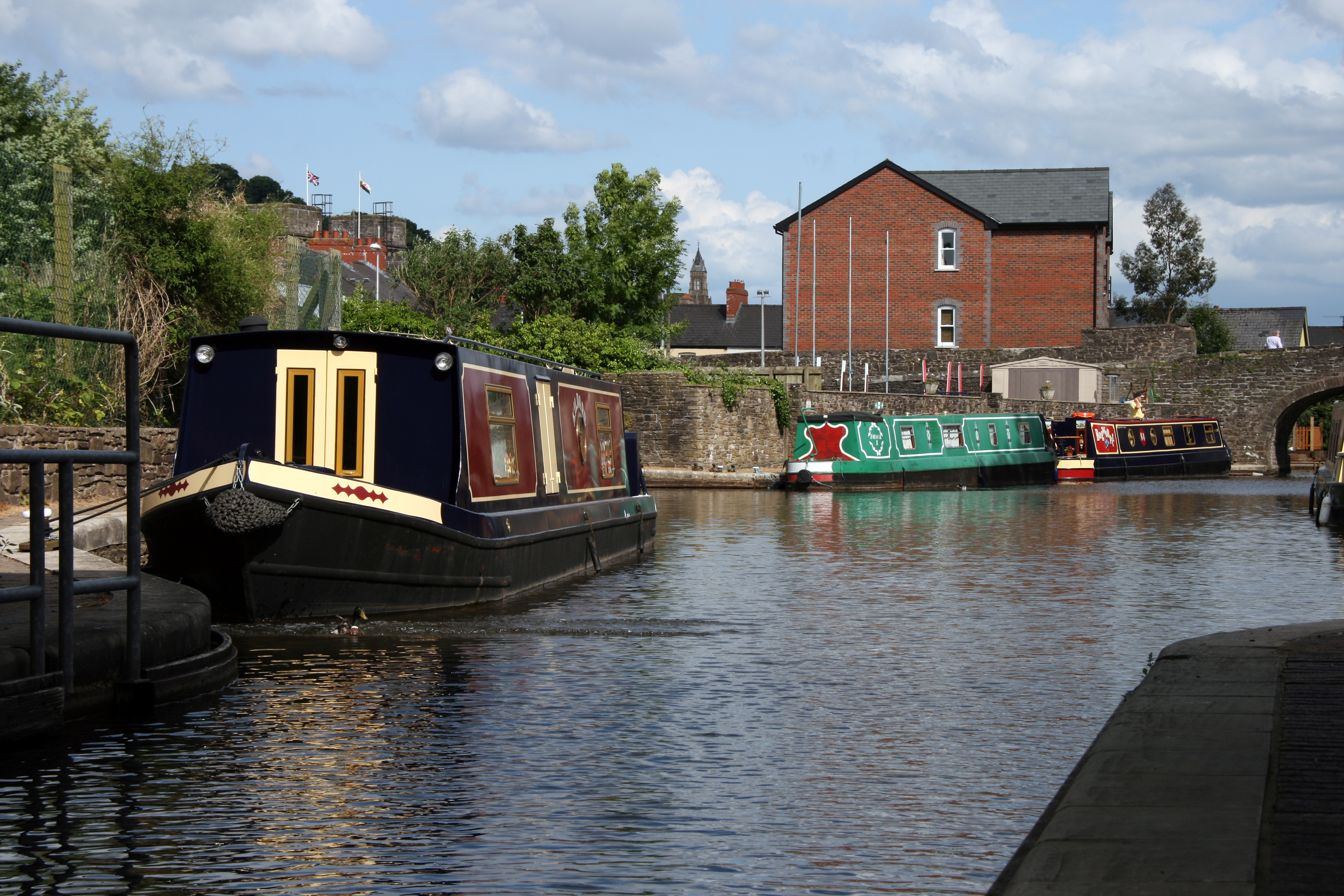
The canal basin at Brecon along the Monmouthshire & Brecon Canal

A canal basin is (particularly in the United Kingdom) an expanse of waterway alongside or at the end of a canal, and wider than the canal, constructed to allow boats to moor or unload cargo without impeding the progress of other traffic, and to allow room for turning, thus serving as a winding hole. For inland waterways, a basin may be thought of as a land-locked harbour.

A basin was often associated with wharves around its perimeter, to support commercial users. In modern times, canal basins are more usually used to moor residential and recreational narrowboats.

== Gallery ==
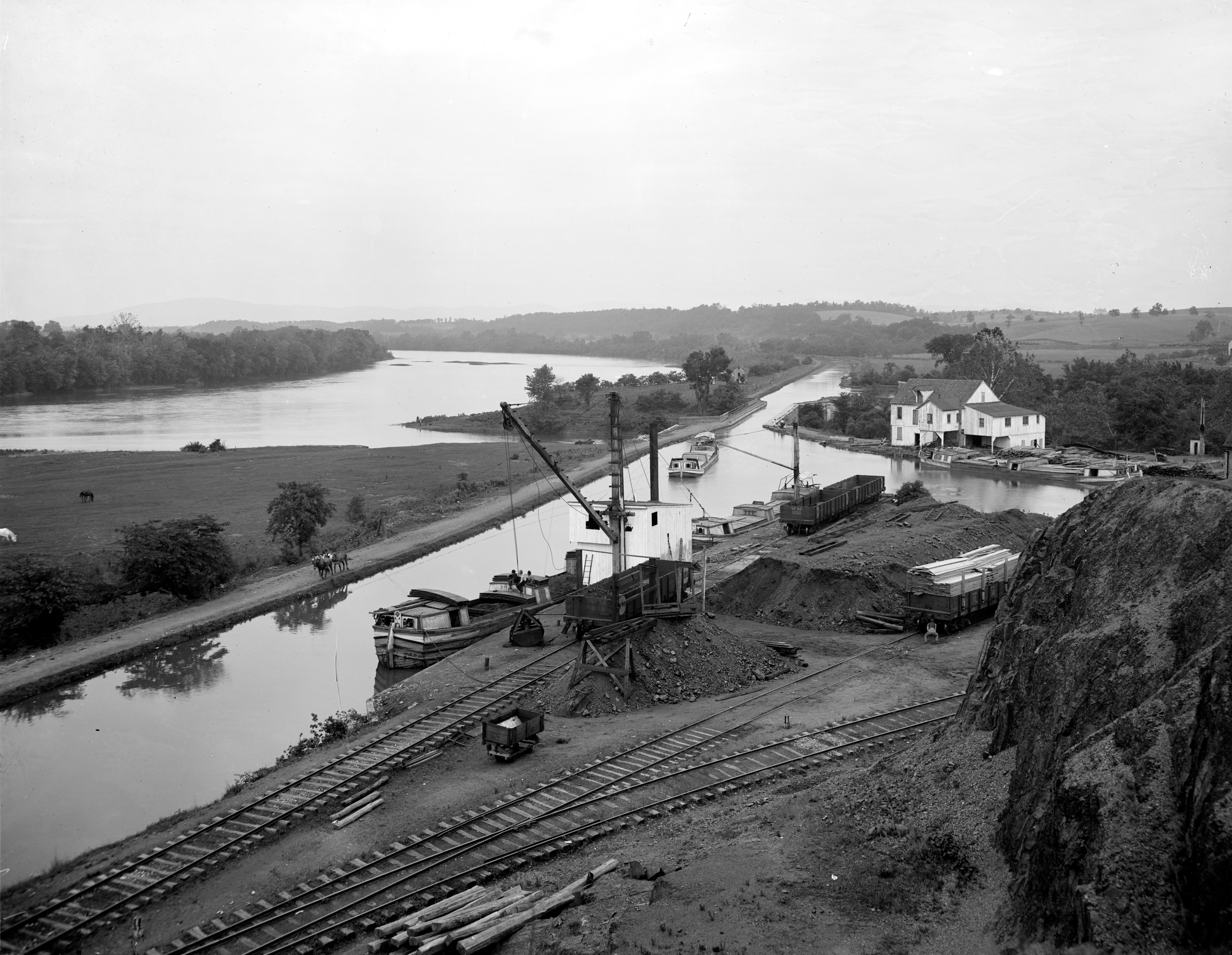
A canal basin at Williamsport, MD on the Chesapeake and Ohio Canal

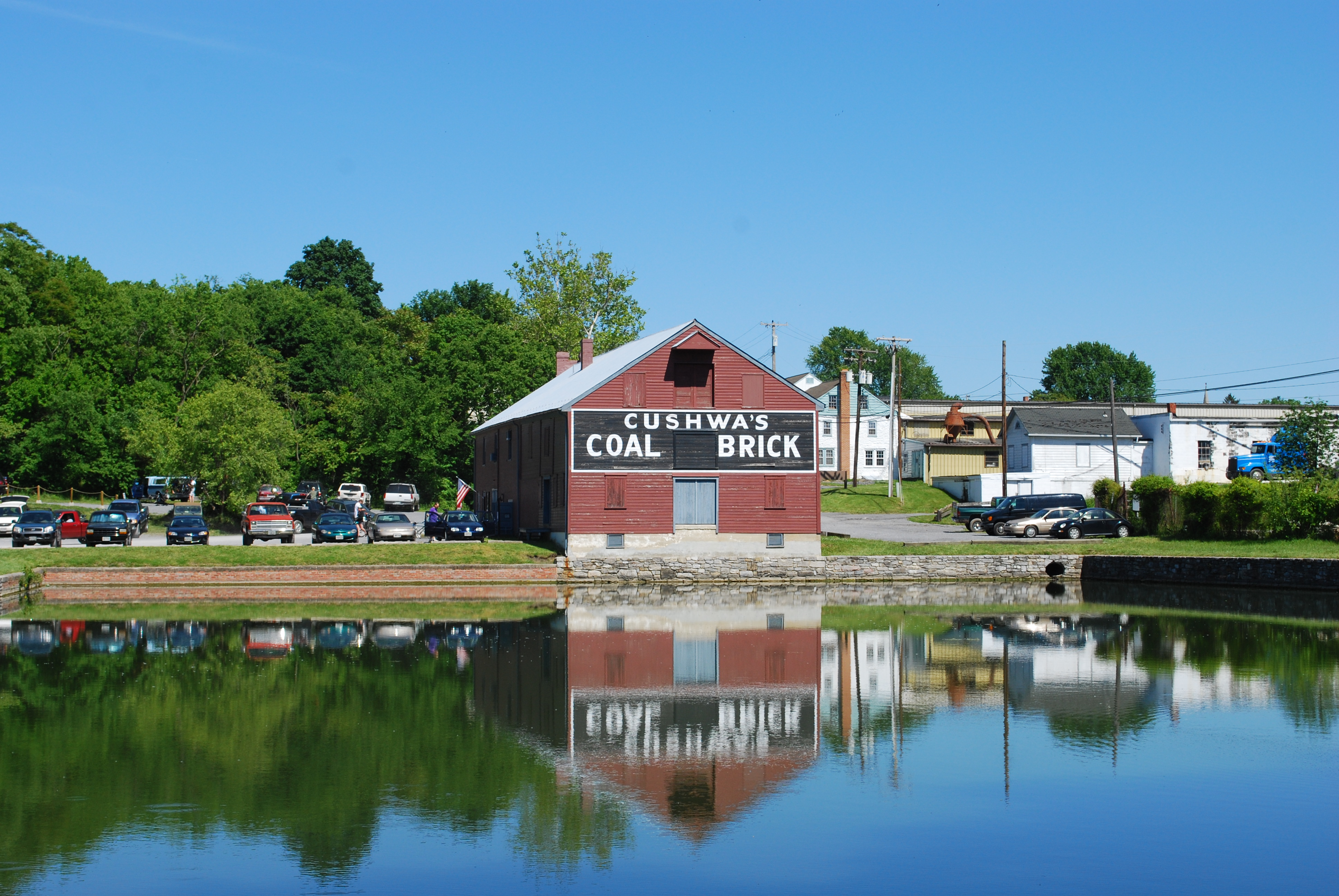
Cushwa basin, a modern look at the canal basin in Williamsport.

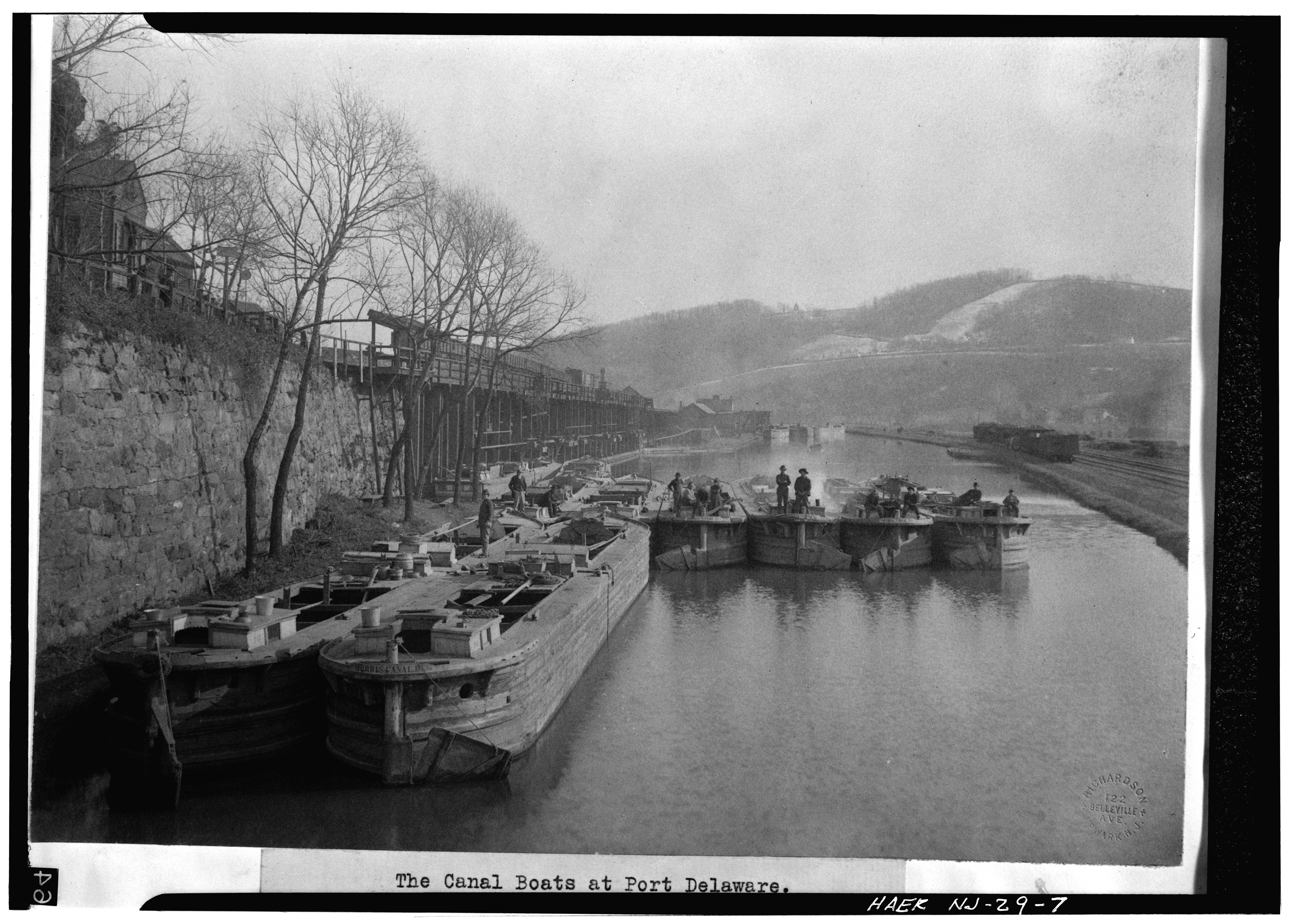
Port Delaware on the Morris Canal, with boats waiting for cargo.

== See also ==
- List of canal basins in the United Kingdom
- Turning basin
