= List of public art in Paddington =

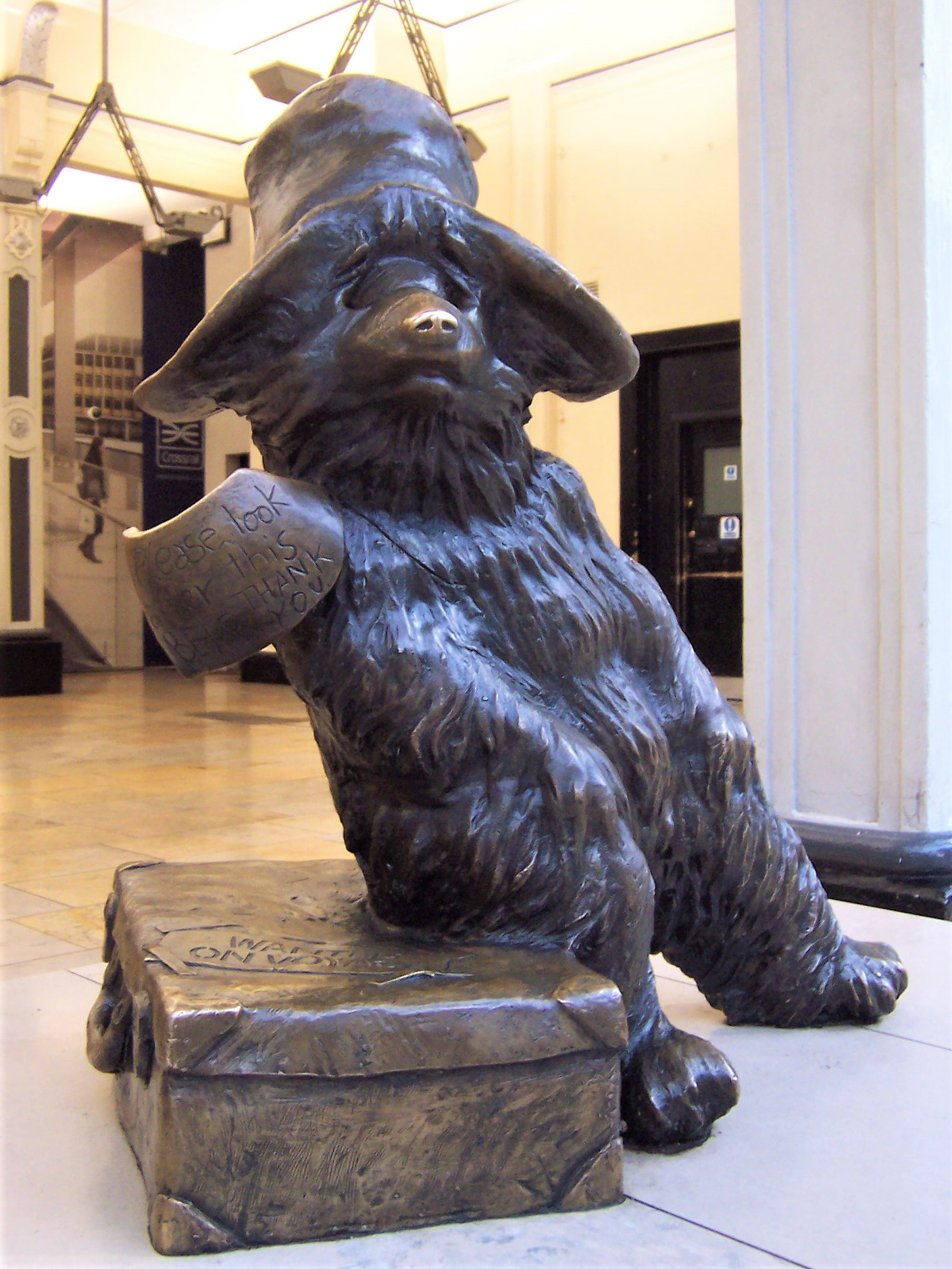
The statue of Paddington Bear by Marcus Cornish at Paddington station

This is a list of public artworks in the former Metropolitan Borough of Paddington in London, now a part of the City of Westminster.

== Bayswater ==
Bayswater is a largely residential district north-west of Charing Cross, bordering with the northern end of Kensington Gardens. Its essential character is now defined by the stuccoed terraces erected from 1827 onwards, which spread in a westerly direction over the course of the 19th century.

Image	Title / subject	Location and coordinates	Date	Artist / designer	Architect / other	Type	Designation	Notes
	Eagle	Orme Square 51°30′37″N 0°11′23″W	1814	?	?	Sculpture on pillar	—N/a	The square is named after Edward Orme, a Bond Street print seller, who also sold two ship-loads of building gravel to Tsar Alexander I of Russia, when he visited London in 1814, and Orme built the square in the same year. The eagle dates from then. Its meaning is a mystery; it is not the eagle from the Orme family crest, and has only one head, so is definitely not the Russian imperial eagle.
	Drinking fountain	Bayswater Road, opposite Elms Mews 51.5114°N 0.1766°W	1872	?	—N/a	Drinking fountain	Grade II	
	War memorial	St John's Church, Hyde Park Crescent 51°30′41″N 0°10′48″W	after 1919	?	—N/a	Cross	Grade II	Commemorates parishioners who died in World War I.
More images	Lancaster Gate Memorial Cross Statues of Saints George, Louis, Maurice, Longinus, Adrian, Florian and Eustace	Lancaster Gate 51°30′41″N 0°10′48″W	1921	Laurence Arthur Turner	Walter Tapper	Memorial	Grade II	Unveiled 27 March 1921. Commemorates residents of the Metropolitan Borough of Paddington who gave their lives in World War I. Severely damaged in the Great Storm of 1987. Re-erected on present site on 11 November 2002.
More images	Memorial to Reginald Brabazon, 12th Earl of Meath	Lancaster Gate 51°30′40″N 0°10′48″W	1934	Joseph Hermon Cawthra	—N/a	Memorial	Grade II	Unveiled 24 May 1934. The inscription on the east face reads, "One King, One Empire, Empire Day"; that on the north, "To him the British Empire was a goodly heritage to be fashioned unto a city of God!"
	Coronation of the Virgin	Our Lady Queen of Heaven, Queensway 51°30′42″N 0°11′14″W	mid–late 20th century	?	?	Mosaic	Grade II	Donated by Mrs Catherine Weston. Built as the United Methodist Free Church, the church was converted to Catholic use in 1954.
	Tempesta	The Lancasters, Bayswater Road 51°30′39″N 0°10′55″W	2012 (unveiled)	Helaine Blumenfeld	—N/a	Sculpture	—N/a	Unveiled 2 May 2012. Carved from Carrara marble at Studio Sem in Pietrasanta, Tuscany, the work stands at 4m high.
	Bust of Skanderbeg	Lady Samuel's Garden, Inverness Terrace 51°30′50″N 0°11′13″W	2012	Kreshuik Xhiku	—N/a	Bust	—N/a	Unveiled 28 November 2012. Marks the centenary of Albanian independence.

== Maida Vale ==
Maida Vale is an area of residential terraces and mansion blocks, defined at its southern end by the Regent's and Grand Union Canals.

Image	Title / subject	Location and coordinates	Date	Artist / designer	Architect / other	Type	Designation	Notes
	Memorial cross	St Mark's Church, Hamilton Terrace 51°31′54″N 0°10′57″W	after 1918	?	?	War memorial	Grade II	Commemorates parishioners who died in World War I.
More images	Two Doves	Warwick Crescent	1965	William Mitchell / Malcolm Thackwray	Malcolm Thackwray	Relief concrete sculpture	—N/a	Adjacent plaque reads IN MEMORY OF ROBERT BROWNING/ TWO DOVES/ SYMBOLISING/ PEACE LOVE AND LEARNING.
	System No. 12	4 Maida Vale 51°31′35″N 0°10′43″W	2006	Julian Wild	EDCO Design	Sculpture	—N/a	A commission by the property developers Crest Nicholson.
	Mural	Westminster Drug Project, Harrow Road 51°31′26″N 0°12′01″W	2009	"Bleach", "Busk" and "Zadok" (from the Elsewhere Collective)	—N/a	Mural	—N/a	

== Paddington ==
Paddington is the area west of Marylebone, in the postal district W2. Much of the recent public art in the area is connected to the Paddington Waterside developments.

Image	Title / subject	Location and coordinates	Date	Artist / designer	Architect / other	Type	Designation	Notes
More images	Statue of Sarah Siddons	Paddington Green 51°31′13″N 0°10′27″W	1897	Léon-Joseph Chavalliaud	—N/a	Statue	Grade II	Unveiled 14 June 1897 by Henry Irving. Modelled after Sir Joshua Reynolds's portrait Mrs Siddons as the Tragic Muse (1783), now in the Huntington Library in California. Siddons attended St Mary's Church on the Green and is buried in the churchyard, near her statue.
	War memorial	St Mary Magdalene's Church, Rowington Close 51°31′20″N 0°11′20″W	1929	Martin Travers		Calvary	—N/a	
	World War II Memorial Gates	Norfolk Place, between St Mary's Hospital and medical school 51°31′02″N 0°10′23″W	1950 (unveiled)	Charles Wheeler	—N/a	Wrought iron gates	—N/a	Unveiled 20 July 1950.
	Paddington Boy Scouts Memorial	Paddington Recreation Ground 51°31′45″N 0°11′27″W	1952 (unveiled)	?	—N/a	War memorial	—N/a	Commemorates the Boy Scouts of Paddington killed in World War II. The symbol of a circle with a dot in the centre is a sign used by Scouts meaning "gone home".
	Mural	Paddington Green Police Station	1971		John Innes Elliott	Mural	—N/a	
	Murals	Westway flyover, near Royal Oak tube station 51°31′11″N 0°11′26″W	1976–1977	Public Art Workshop (Desmond Rochford and David Savage)	—N/a	Murals	—N/a	Dedicated "to the working people of Paddington", these were, at the time of their completion, the largest exterior murals in England. A critic for the Observer noted shortly after their completion that "a large dose of social realism has done wonders for the grey desert of Royal Oak".
More images	The Messenger, or Getting Back on the Right Foot	In front of St Mary’s Hospital, South Wharf Road 51°31′04″N 0°10′27″W	1993	Allan Sly	—N/a	Statue	—N/a	
More images	Walking Man and Standing Man	Paddington Central 51°31′12″N 0°10′48″W	1998 and 2000	Sean Henry	—N/a	Statues	—N/a	
	The Family	Sheldon Square, Paddington Central 51°31′10″N 0°10′49″W	2001	Jon Buck	—N/a	Sculptural group	—N/a	Another cast is situated at Milton Keynes General Hospital.
	Untitled (Yellow)	One Kingdom Street, Paddington Central 51°31′09″N 0°10′54″W	2001	Stephen Gontarski	—N/a	Sculpture	—N/a	Made of glass fibre painted bright yellow and lacquered, the sculpture is intended to invite a "corporeal reception by the public" and to "create a heart in the midst of an urban setting."
More images	Lock, Level, Line	West End Quay, Paddington Basin 51°31′07″N 0°10′17″W	2004	Danny Lane	—N/a	Sculptures	—N/a	The work consists of four towers made from stacked corten steel and layered glass, which are intended to reflect the changing levels of water in the lock.
	Clove 2007	Cleveland Terrace 51°31′03″N 0°10′48″W	2007	Bryan Kneale	—N/a	Sculpture	—N/a	
	Billy Bob & Mishke	Paddington Central 51°31′09″N 0°10′58″W	2008	Gary Webb	—N/a	Sculpture	—N/a	Pendant sculptures, located in water features at the extreme edge of the Paddington Central development, of metal frameworks which support "blobs" of steel, painted in bright colours.
	Europea 1 and Europea 2	Paddington Central 51°31′09″N 0°10′52″W	2008	John Aiken	—N/a	Sculptures	—N/a	Twin sculptures fashioned from Portuguese silver-grey granite with coloured enamel panels attached.
	Basketball 2012 Olympics and Paralympics	Queen Elizabeth the Queen Mother Wing, St Mary's Hospital	2012	Ron Haselden		Glass panels with LED lighting	—N/a	Based on a drawing by a paediatric patient at the hospital's school.
	Panels	Lindo Wing, St Mary's Hospital 51°31′03″N 0°10′28″W	2012	Julian Opie	—N/a	Panels	—N/a	Opie wished to go against the general trend of artworks in hospitals by producing works with the aim "not to calm but rather to enliven".
	Mary Seacole, Alan Turing and Michael Bond (pictured)	St Mary's Square 51°31′13″N 0°10′36″W	2013	?	—N/a	Statues	—N/a	Three two-dimensional steel statues of notable people who lived in Paddington, as voted for by local residents. From the Portrait Bench series of similar sculptures, commissioned by the charity Sustrans to stand along new cycling routes.
More images	Bearing Up	Sheldon Square, Paddington Central	2014	?	—N/a	Statue	—N/a	Originally part of the Paddington Trail, which marked the release of the film Paddington. The blue colour represents the nearby Grand Union Canal.
	Brick Bear	Merchant Square, Paddington Basin	2014	Robin Partington and Partners	—N/a	Statue	—N/a	Also from the Paddington Trail, the statue is decorated all over with a pattern of London stock bricks, suggested by the architects of the surrounding development.
More images	Statue of Simon Milton	Merchant Square, Paddington Basin	2014	Bruce Denny	—N/a	Statue	—N/a	Unveiled 11 September 2014 by Eric Pickles. Milton played an instrumental role in the regeneration of Paddington Basin and was a friend of the sculptor.
	Mural	Westway Flyover Cycleway	2014	Robert Dawson		Ceramic mural	—N/a	Includes a portrait of Isambard Kingdom Brunel, a geometric pattern based on the Crossrail logo and other references to the area.
More images	Message from the Unseen World Alan Turing	Bishop's Bridge Road underpass, Paddington Central	2016	United Visual Artists	Nick Drake (poem)	Installation	—N/a	Perforated aluminium panels with LEDs displaying extracts from Turing's paper "Computing Machinery and Intelligence" (1950) as patterns based on Baudot code, combined with a poem specially commissioned from Drake.
	Axis Mundi	Paddington Basin	2017	Gavin Turk	—N/a	Installation	—N/a	An oversized bronze replica of a sink plug, covering a borehole. The title ('Centre of the Earth') alludes to Socle du Monde by Piero Manzoni, and the work also references Marcel Duchamp's Bouche-evier.
	Real Time	50 Eastbourne Terrace	2021	Maarten Baas	Sheppard Robson and Yard Nine	Installation	—N/a	A clock with what appears to be a man in a three-piece suit inside, painting and removing the hands.
More images	Abundance	Amphitheatre, Sheldon Square, Paddington Central	2023	Adam Nathaniel Furman		Installation	—N/a	A 50m-long curving wall made from metal sheets in bright colours.
More images	The Wild Table of Love	Corner of Praed Street and Eastbourne Terrace	Installed 2024	Gillie and Marc	—N/a	Sculptural group	—N/a	
More images	Yellow Orange Hermit	Paddington Square	2024	Ugo Rondinone	—N/a	Sculpture	—N/a	
More images	Somethinging	Paddington Square	2024	Pae White	—N/a	Sculpture	—N/a	
	Mural	Grand Union Canal 51°31′22″N 0°11′31″W		Kevin Herlihy	—N/a	Mural	—N/a	Made of debris collected by Stowe Youth Club.

=== Paddington station ===
Image	Title / subject	Location and coordinates	Date	Artist / designer	Architect / other	Type	Designation	Notes
	Peace, Plenty, Science and Industry	Hilton London Paddington, Praed Street	1854	John Thomas	Philip Charles Hardwick	Architectural sculpture	Grade II	
More images	Great Western Railway War Memorial	Platform 1 51°31′02″N 0°10′42″W	1922	Charles Sargeant Jagger	Thomas S. Tait	Stone screen with statue	Grade I	Unveiled 11 November 1922 (Armistice Day) by Viscount Churchill. The figure of a soldier stands reading a letter from home in front of a panel of black marble, suggesting the entrance to a trench dugout.
More images	Statue of Isambard Kingdom Brunel	Platform 8	1982	John Doubleday	—N/a	Statue	—N/a	Unveiled 26 May 1982. One of two statues of Brunel commissioned by the Bristol & West building society; its companion, a standing figure, was unveiled in Bristol the same day. Originally stood on the main concourse at the entrance to the Underground; relocated to a site off Platform 1 in 1998, and to the current site in 2014 when work began on Crossrail.
	Tile motifs	Paddington tube station (Bakerloo, Circle and District lines)	1984–1987	David Hamilton	?	Overprinted industrial ceramic tiles	—N/a	The scheme reproduces patent drawings for Marc Isambard Brunel's early tunnelling shield for the Thames Tunnel, a precursor to those used for the London Underground.
More images	Statue of Paddington Bear	Platform 1	2000	Marcus Cornish	—N/a	Statue	—N/a	Unveiled 24 February 2000 by Michael Bond, the character's creator. Represents his first appearance in A Bear Called Paddington (1958), sitting on a battered suitcase with a label round his neck reading "Please look after this bear. Thank you."
More images	Paddington Bear Book Bench	Platform 1	2014	Michelle Heron	—N/a	Painted bench in the shape of an open book	—N/a	Originally part of the National Literacy Trust's Books About Town art trail and now on permanent loan to the station.
	A Cloud Index	Elizabeth line entrance	2016	Spencer Finch	Weston Williamson	Design printed onto glass canopy	—N/a	60 pastel drawings of clouds reproduced on 180 glass panels on a 120m-long canopy; one of the largest permanent artworks ever created in London. Installation began in 2017.

== Tyburnia ==
Image	Title / subject	Location and coordinates	Date	Artist / designer	Type	Designation	Notes
	Paddington Bear	Connaught Village Green	2024	?	Sculpture	—N/a	Unveiled 8 October 2024 at Connaught Street as part of Paddington Visits, a sculpture trail promoting the film Paddington in Peru. Unveiled at the current site on 23 September 2025.

== Bibliography ==
- Compton, Ann (2005). The Sculpture of Charles Sargeant Jagger. British Sculptors and Sculpture. London: Lund Humphries.
- Matthews, Peter (2018). London's Statues and Monuments. Oxford: Shire Publications.
