= List of monuments and memorials to Simon Milton =

This is a list of monuments and memorials dedicated to the memory of the British politician Simon Milton.

== Miscellaneous ==
A square in the Victoria district of London was named Sir Simon Milton Square on 27 September 2020 by Milton's civil partner, Robert Davis and Milton's mother, Ruth.

The Sir Simon Milton Westminster UTC, a University technical college was opened in September 2017 and named after Milton.

A memorial garden at Paddington Recreation Ground was dedicated to Milton in 2012. It had originally been shown at the Chelsea Flower Show in 2012, where it was the recipient of a silver medal.

== Public art ==
Image	Title / subject	Location and coordinates	Date	Artist / designer	Type	Designation	Notes
	Simon Milton	Merchant Square, Paddington Basin, W2	2014	Bruce Denny	Seated statue in bronze		Unveiled by the Secretary of State for Communities and Local Government Eric Pickles on 11 September 2014.
	Simon Milton	One Eagle Place, St James's, W1	2013	Alan Micklethwaite	Portrait bust and relief		Depicts Milton with City Hall in the background. Unveiled by the Mayor of London, Boris Johnson on 29 April 2013. Johnson described Milton as the "personification of calm, sweet reason" and described Milton as "one of the most gifted public administrators of his generation" at the unveiling ceremony.
	Simon Milton	Entrance to Crown Square, One Tower Bridge, Potters Field, Southwark, SE1	2016	Philip Jackson	Seated statue in bronze		Milton is depicted sitting on a bench facing City Hall and Potters Fields Park. Unveiled by the Mayor of London, Boris Johnson on 6 April 2016.
More images	'Silence'	Opposite The Connaught, Carlos Place, Mayfair, W1	2011	Tadao Ando	Fountain		A bronze plaque near the fountain marks the fountain's dedication to Milton. Part of a refurbishment of Mount Street, commissioned by the Grosvenor Estate and the Connaught Hotel. The leader of Westminster City Council, Colin Barrow, said that it was "particularly poignant" that the fountain bears a memorial to Milton as he "did so much to pioneer the joint working between the private and public sector that has brought such improvements to the city" during his tenure as leader.
