= Michel Mossessian =

French architect

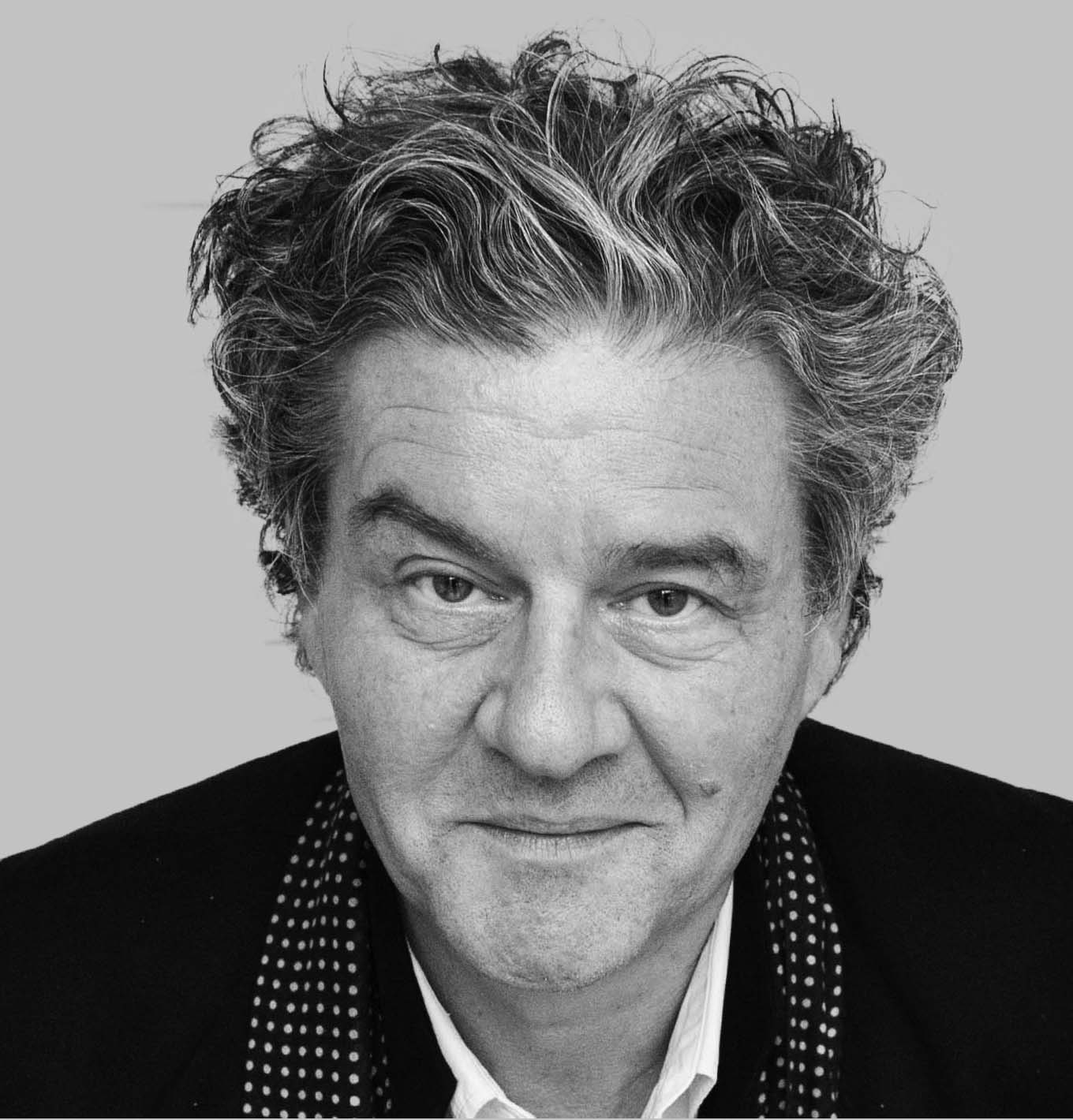
- Michel Mossessian in 2014
- Born: 11 November 1959 (age 60); Paris, Île-de-France, France
- Education: École nationale supérieure des Beaux-Arts (Paris-Belleville); Cooper Union School of Architecture; Harvard Graduate School of Design
- Occupation: Architect
- Awards: MIPIM AR Future Projects Award; Holcim Award
- Practice: Mossessian Architecture
- Buildings: King's Cross, London, UK; Exchange House, London, UK; 1 Fleet Place, London, UK; Vila Olímpica, Barcelona, Spain; Five Merchant Square, London, UK; NATO Headquarters, Brussels, Belgium; ExxonMobil Technology Centre, Shanghai, China
- Projects: Musheireb - Heart of Doha, Doha, Qatar (in progress); Place Lalla Yeddouna, Fez, Morocco (December 2013)
- Website: Official website

Michel Mossessian (born 11 November 1959) is a French-born architect of Armenian heritage, based in London, UK. He holds French, British and American citizenship.

== Education ==
Michel Mossessian gained his diploma in architecture at the École Nationale Supérieure des Beaux-Arts UP N°8 (Paris Belleville), where he also engaged in philosophy under Jacques Derrida and Michel Foucault. He was a recipient of the Villa Medicis Hors les Murs fellowship and went on to the Cooper Union School of Architecture in New York, where he studied Advanced Design. He subsequently completed his master's degree in design studies at Harvard Graduate School of Design in Cambridge, MA, where he studied with Raphael Moneo and Bill Mitchell, along with studies at the MIT Media Lab on artificial intelligence.

== Early career ==
Mossessian worked for Skidmore, Owings & Merrill (SOM) as Senior Designer in their Chicago office and as Design Director at the London offices. Along with Senior partner, Larry Oltmanns, they made a successful bid resulting in the design and completion in 2017 of the new NATO headquarters in Brussels.

== Mossessian Architecture ==
Mossessian established the architectural studio of Mossessian Architecture in 2005 (originally named Mossessian & Partners, renamed in 2015) where he serves as principal architect.

His work spans architecture and urban design, combining art, craft and engineering to create places rooted in their cultural and environmental contexts.

His first building design in London was the Carmine Building, 5 Merchant Square, a 15-storey office building at Five Merchant Square. As part of the Paddington Basin Development, the building was topped off in 2009, by the Mayor of London, Boris Johnson.

In 2010, Mossessian & Partners completed three buildings: 5 Merchant Square (headquarters for Marks and Spencers) in Paddington, London; ExxonMobil Headquarters in Shanghai, China; and a private residence in Sorede, France.

In 2011, the company won an open international competition for an urban renewal project in the Medina of Fes, Morocco which is now on site.

In 2015 the practice was renamed Mossessian Architecture. Since that time Mossessian Architecture has designed 4 phases of a regeneration scheme in Doha (Msheireb), two buildings in Central London's King's Cross area, and won an international competition to design a museum of the Islamic Faith in Makkah, Saudi Arabia.

Outside of the practice, Mossessian lectures widely at schools of architecture and cultural institutions. Currently he is a visiting professor at Imperial College London where he lectures on how architecture affects well-being. He also personally organises events to promote innovation and development in the industry.

== Design approach ==
Mossessian has a reputation for being at the helm of new approaches and technologies. Edwin Heathcote, Architecture Critic at the Financial Times, described Mossessian as follows: "Very few architects are able to blend the seductively reductive commercial architecture of Mid-Century Chicago with the lightness of touch and creative flair of contemporary European design — Mossessian is at the forefront of those few."

His "Black Box method" has been a foundation of every project the practice delivers and ensures a shared vision from the outset.

Mossessian is deeply interested in cultural localism and architecture that is concerned with far more than the buildings themselves. Propelled by his vision of creating culturally responsive architecture, he has sought out like-minded organisations, such as UNESCO and the MCC.

== Significant projects ==
- S1 building in King's Cross, London – under construction
- S2 building in King's Cross, London - under construction
- Place Lalla Yeddouna in Fes, Morocco - under construction
- Msheireb development in Doha, Qatar – under construction
- 5 Merchant Square (Marks and Spencers Headquarters), London – completed 2010
- ExxonMobil Building in Shanghai, China – completed 2010
- Exchange House, London, UK
- 1 Fleet Place, London, UK - completed 1992
- NATO headquarters in Brussels, Belgium – with Skidmore, Owings & Merrill
- Villa Olympica Barcelona in Barcelona, Spain – with Skidmore, Owings & Merrill
- Broadgate in London, UK – with Skidmore, Owings & Merrill

== Awards, recognition and other highlights ==
2025 Aga Khan Award for Architecture

Finalist (shortlisted) - Place Lalla Yeddouna, Fez

5 Merchant Square

- MIPIM Special Tribute to the Country of Honour, UK

- LEAF Commercial Building of the Year 2012

- Runner up for 2011 BCO Awards

Place Lalla Yeddouna

- Winner of 2014 AR Future Project Cultural Regeneration Award

- Winner of 2011 Holcim Awards, Urban Precinct Reconstruction & Rehabilitation

- World Architecture Festival Cultural Regeneration Award 2013

- LEAF Best Future Building 2012

- World Architecture Festival Cultural Regeneration 2011

Msheireb Doha Qatar

- Overall Winner 2012 AR Future Projects Awards

- Winner of 2011 AR Future Project Sustainability Award

- World Architecture Festival Public Realm Award 2013

- World Architecture Festival Residential Award 2011

Competitions Awards

2016 Makkah Museum, Jeddah, Saudi Arabia ^{[24]} - 1st prize winning entry, expected completion 2020

2014 King’s Cross Argent, S1 and S2 block - Winning entry, completion 2018 and 2020

2013 Worldcup Stadium, Qatar - Confidential

2011 Mushereib Heart of Doha, phase 4 - Winning entry, 4 high rises, completion 2020

2011 Place Lalla Yedouna, Fez - 1st prize winning entry, completion 2017

2010 Mushereib Heart of Doha, Qatar, phase 3 - Winning entry, super block T1, completion 2018

== Gallery ==
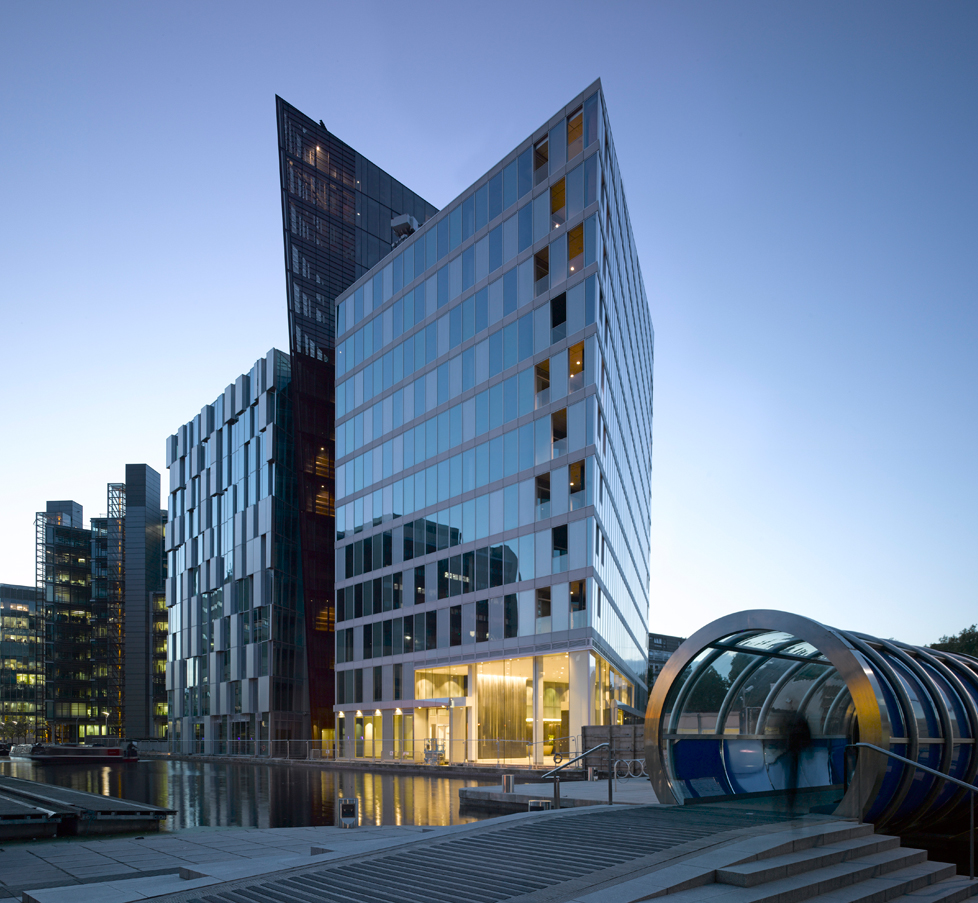
5 Merchant Square in Paddington Basin, London, UK

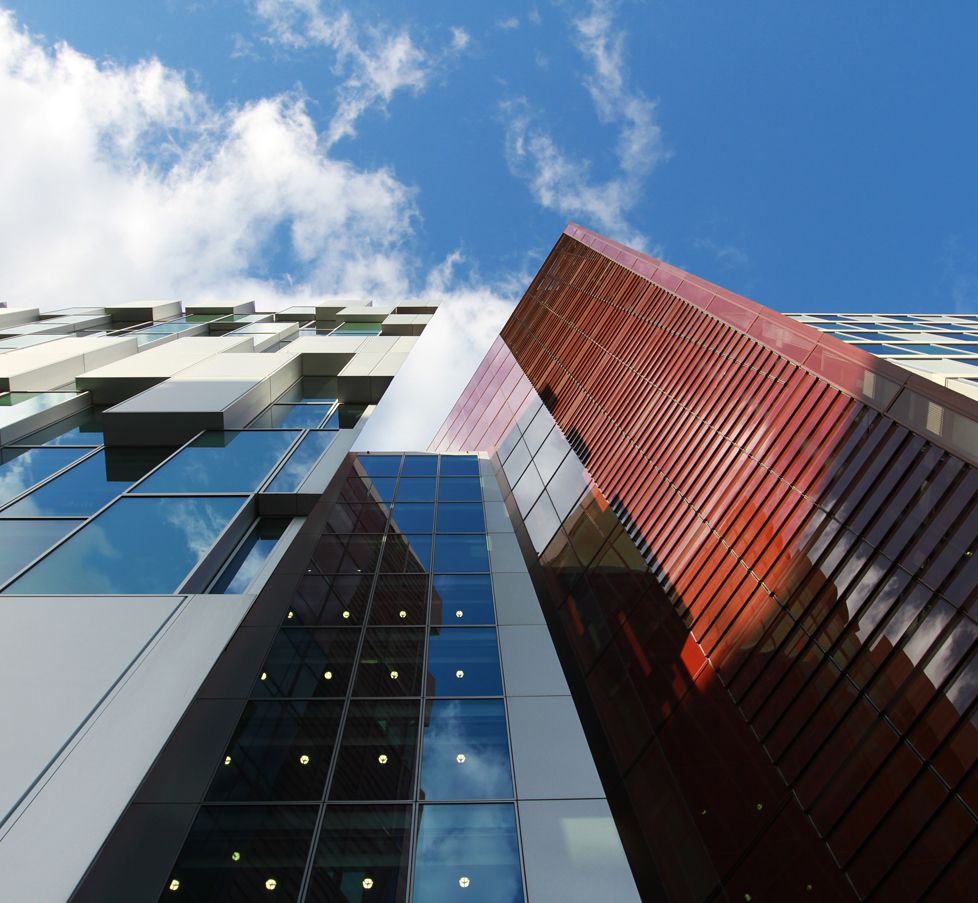
5 Merchant Square London, UK

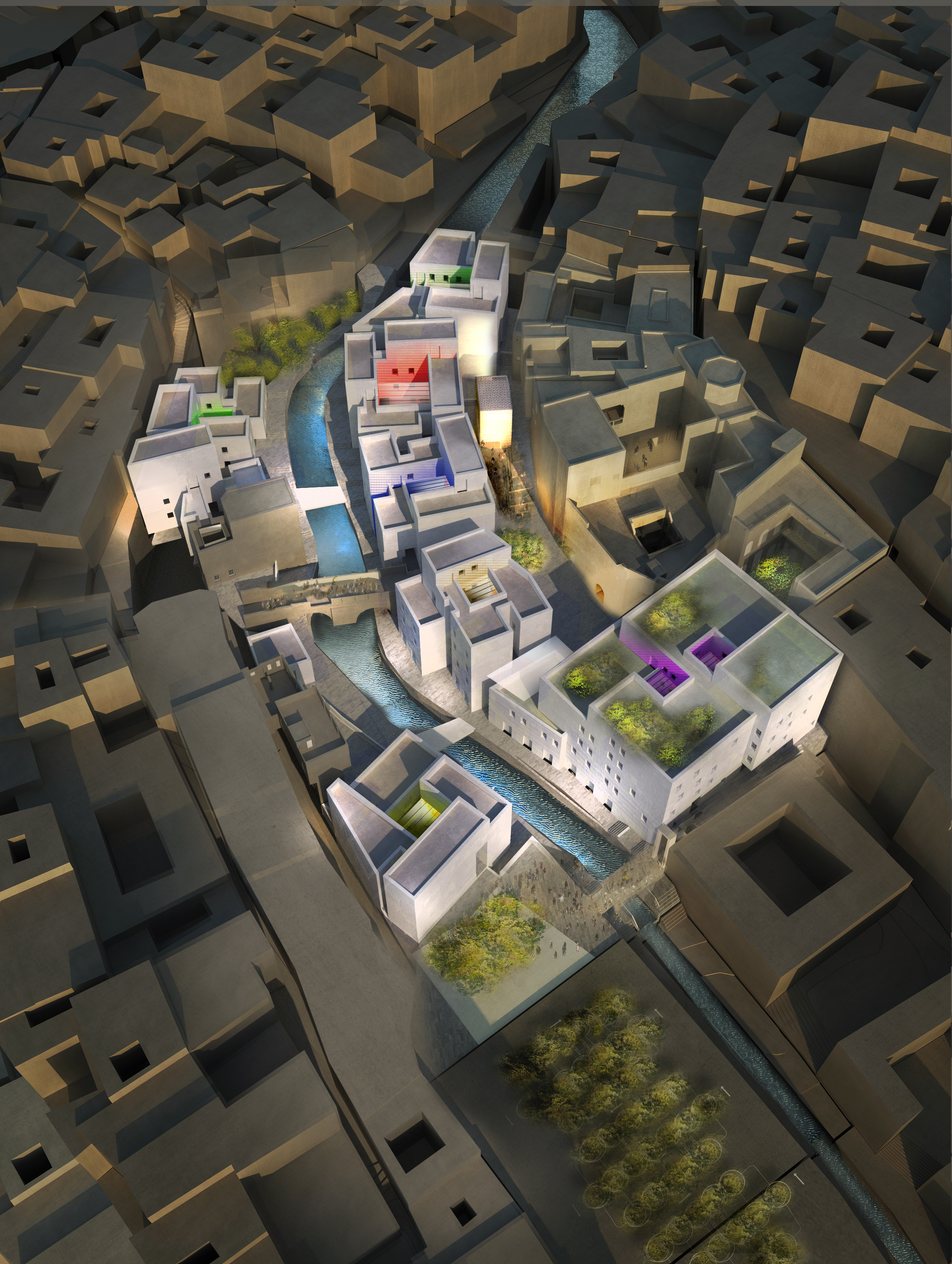
Place Lalla Yeddouna World Heritage Site, Medina of Fez, Morocco

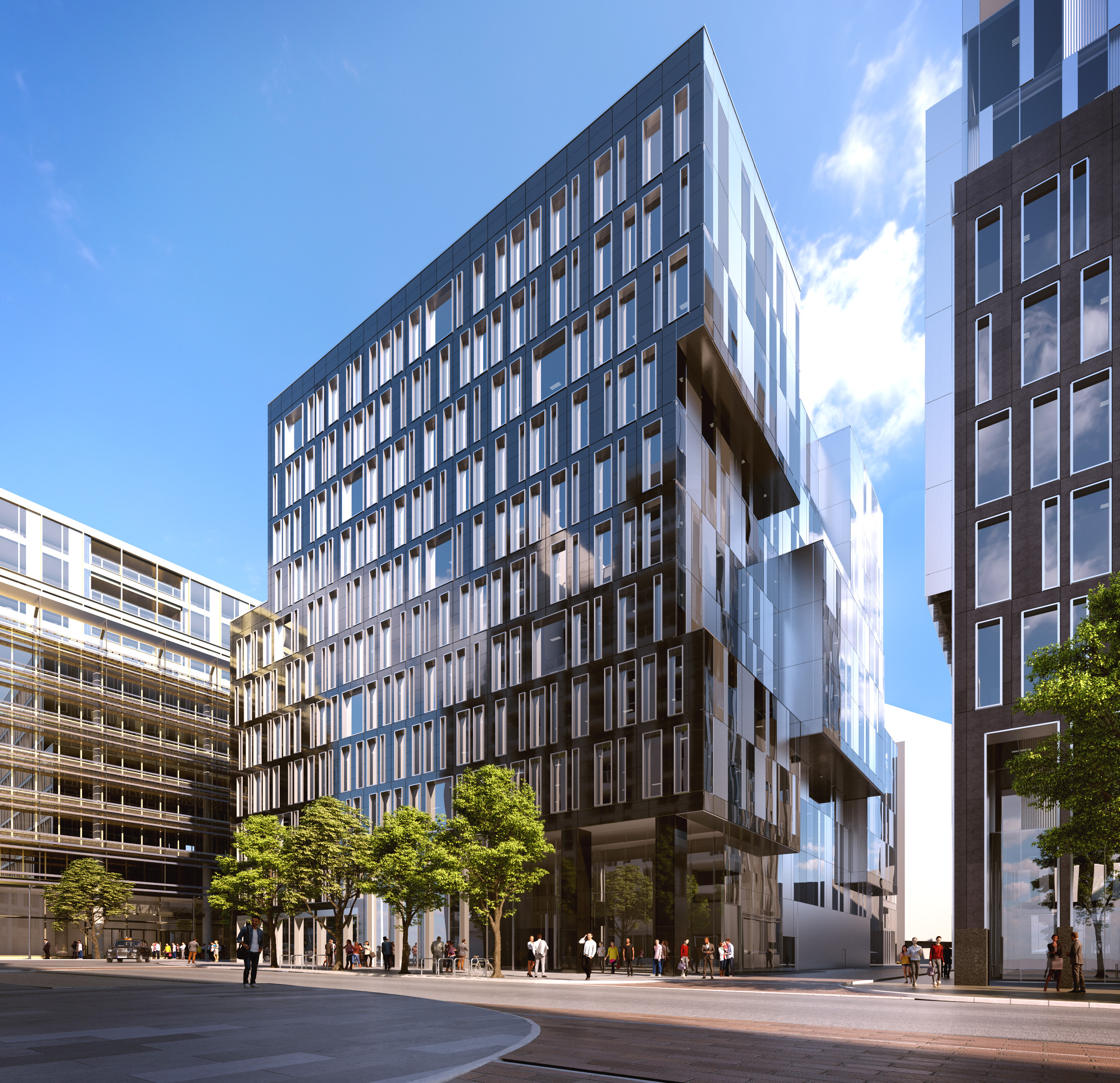
S1 Building, King's Cross, London, UK

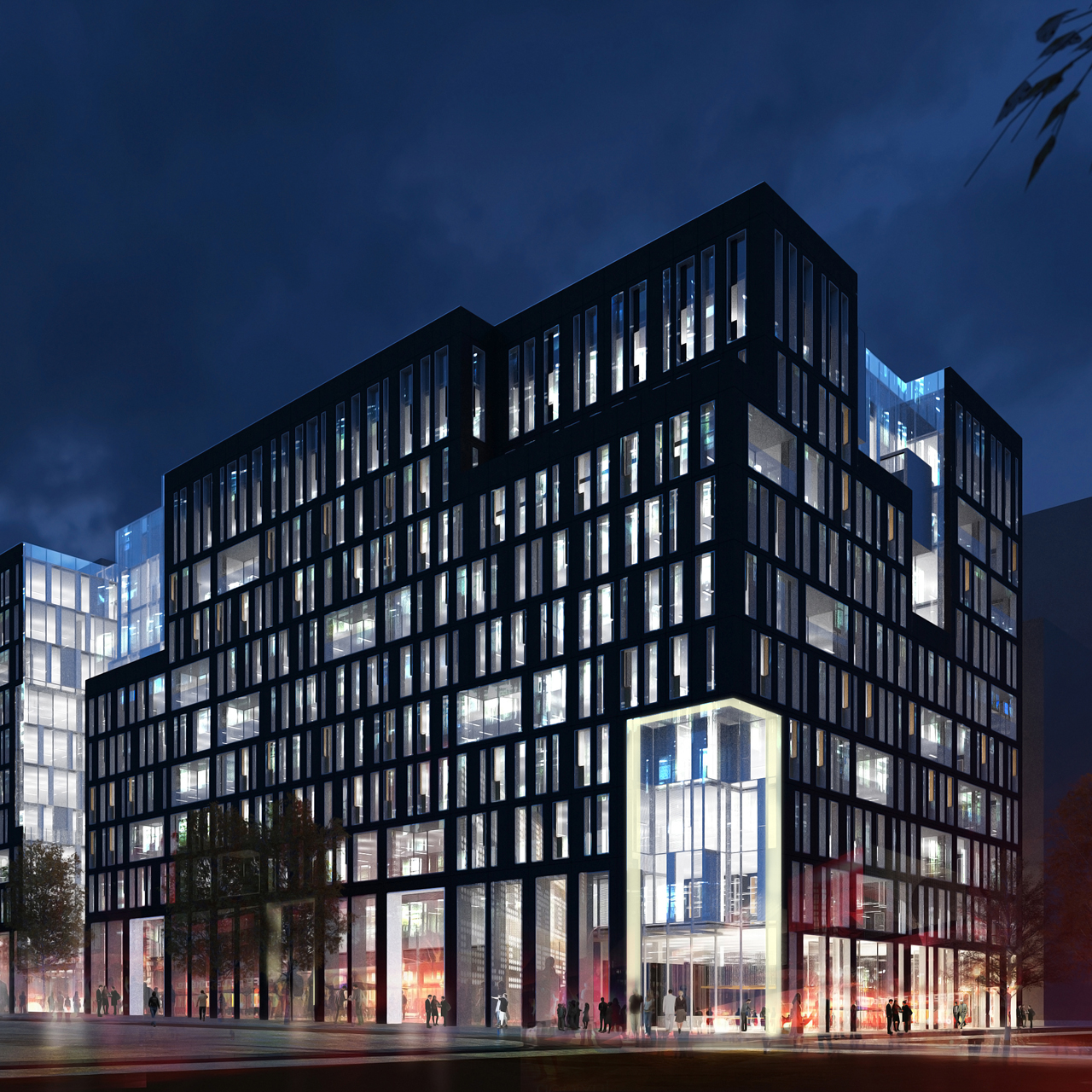
S2 Building, King's Cross, London, UK

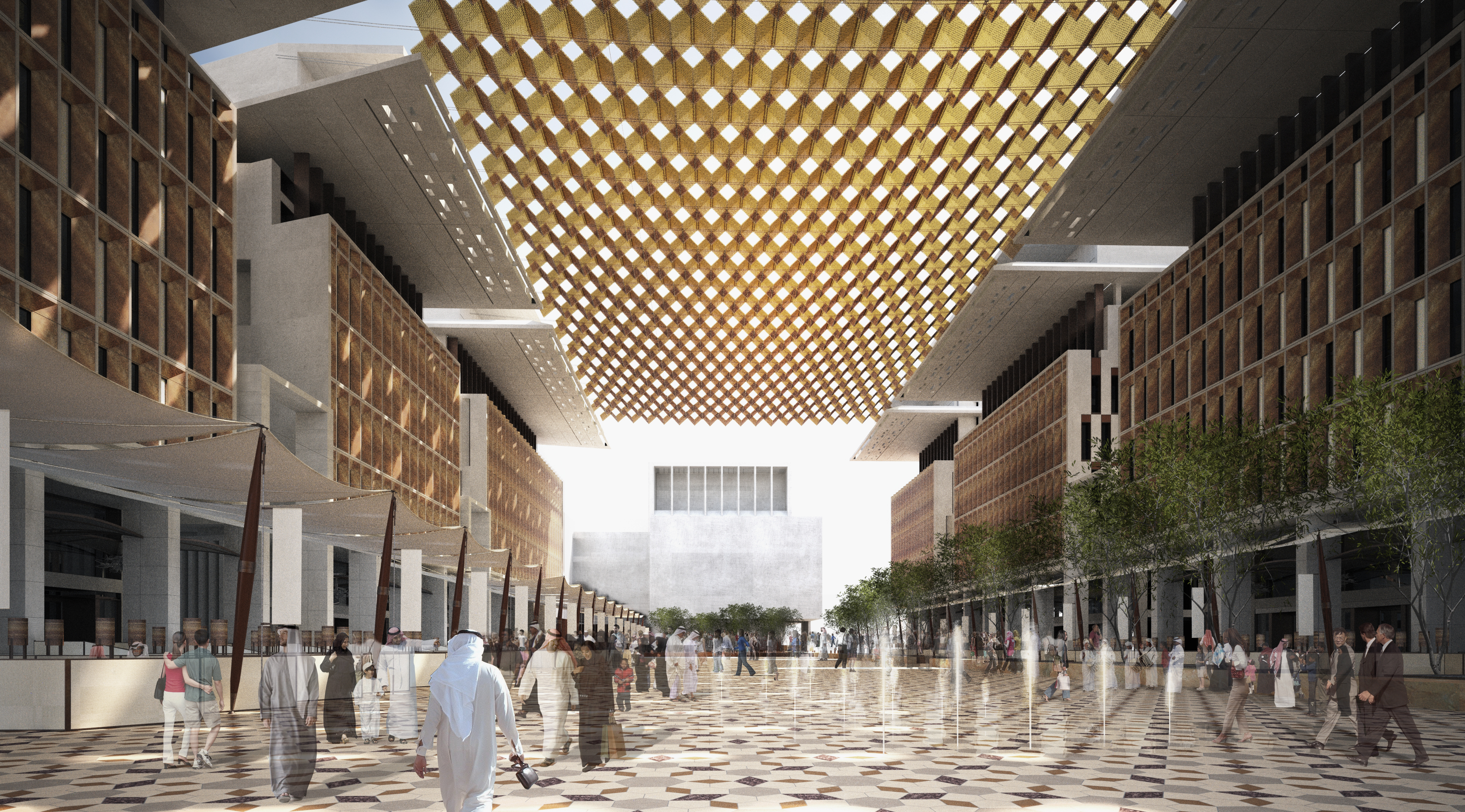
Msheireb Downtown Doha, Baharat Square, Doha, Qatar

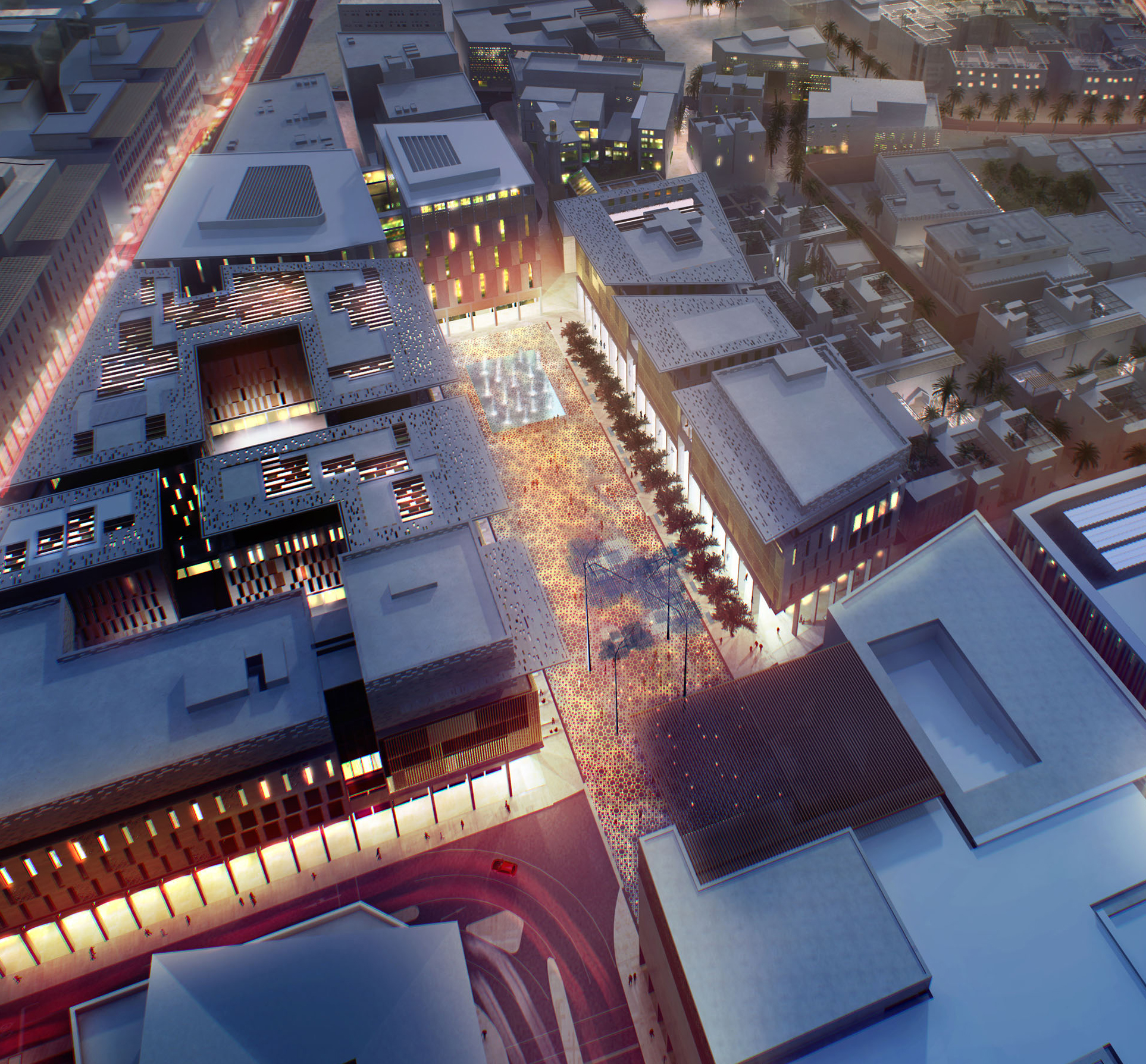
Msheireb Downtown, Doha Qatar

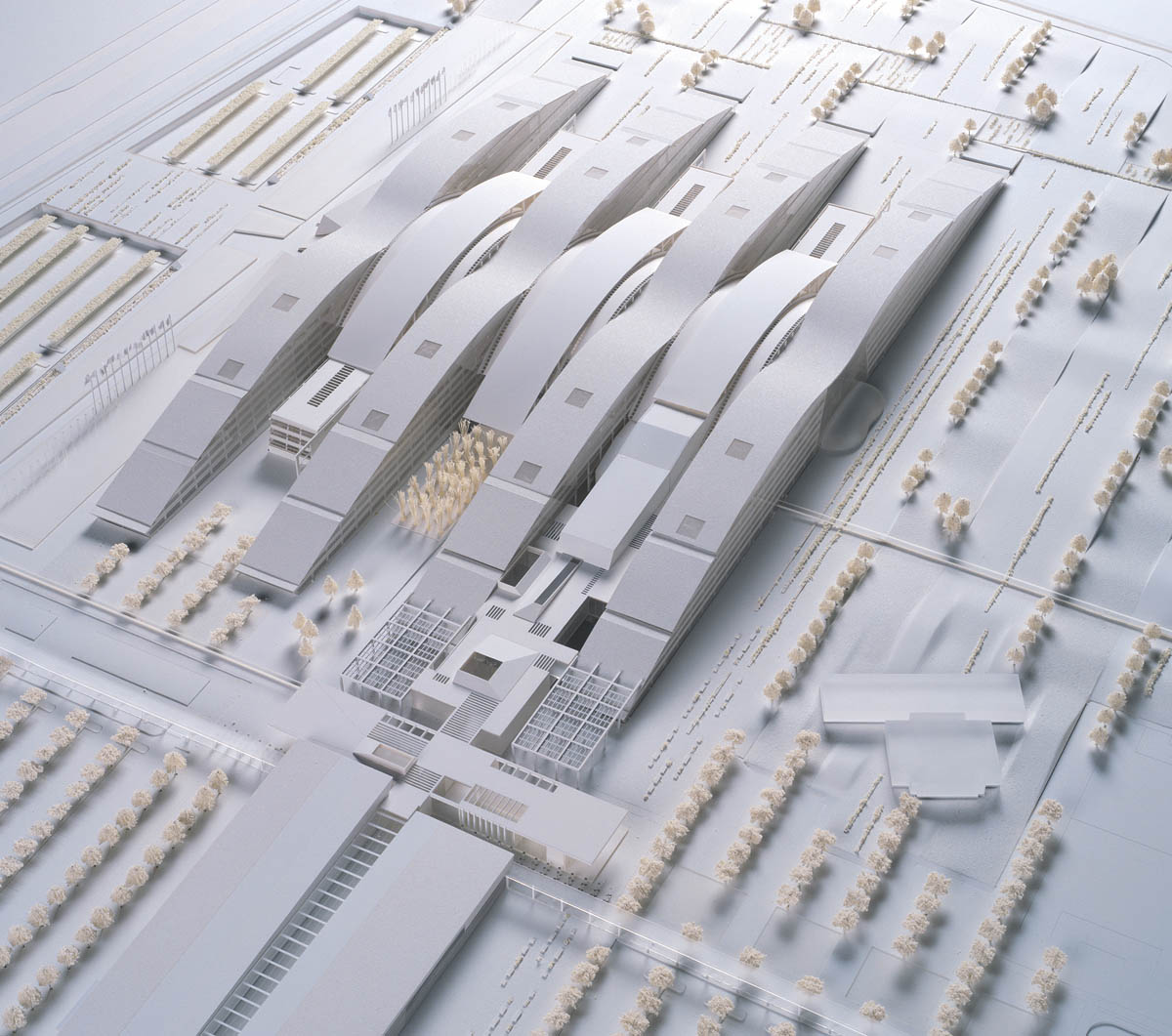
NATO Headquarters, Bruxelles, Belgium
