= Paddington Basin =

Canal basin in Paddington, London, England

Coordinates: 51.518°N 0.174°W

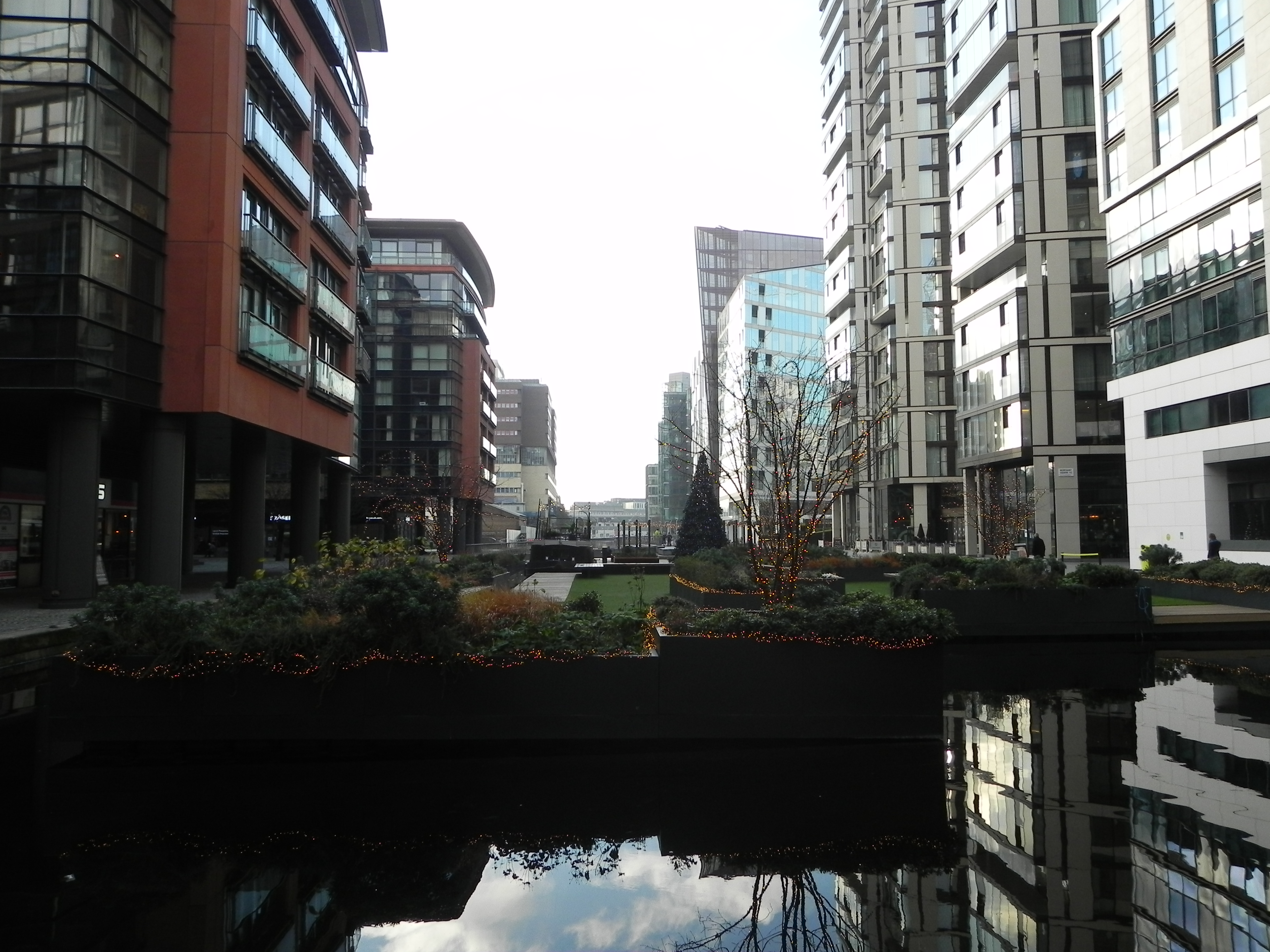
The Grand Union Canal at the St Mary's end of the Paddington Basin in 2020

Paddington Basin is the name given to a long canal basin, and its surrounding area, in Paddington, London.

The basin, which opened in 1801, commences 500m south of the junction known as Little Venice, of the Regent's Canal and the Paddington Arm of the Grand Union Canal and runs for a similar length east–west.

Since 2000, the basin has been the centre of a major redevelopment as part of the wider Paddington Waterside scheme and is surrounded by modern buildings.

== History ==
The canal basin was opened in 1801, with Paddington being chosen as the location because of its position on the New Road which led to the east, providing for onward transport. In its heyday, the basin was a major transshipment facility, and a hive of activity. The basin enabled deliveries of straw, vegetables and cattle, and became a centre for coal merchants and supply of building materials. By the late 19th century, the basin was a centre for metalwork and light engineering companies.

In 1946, a Pentecostal Chapel opened at 141 Harrow Road, and a church remains in the new development at that address.

In 1974, plans to fill in the canal basin were abandoned as the canal was growing in popularity as a tourism and leisure destination.

== Redevelopment ==
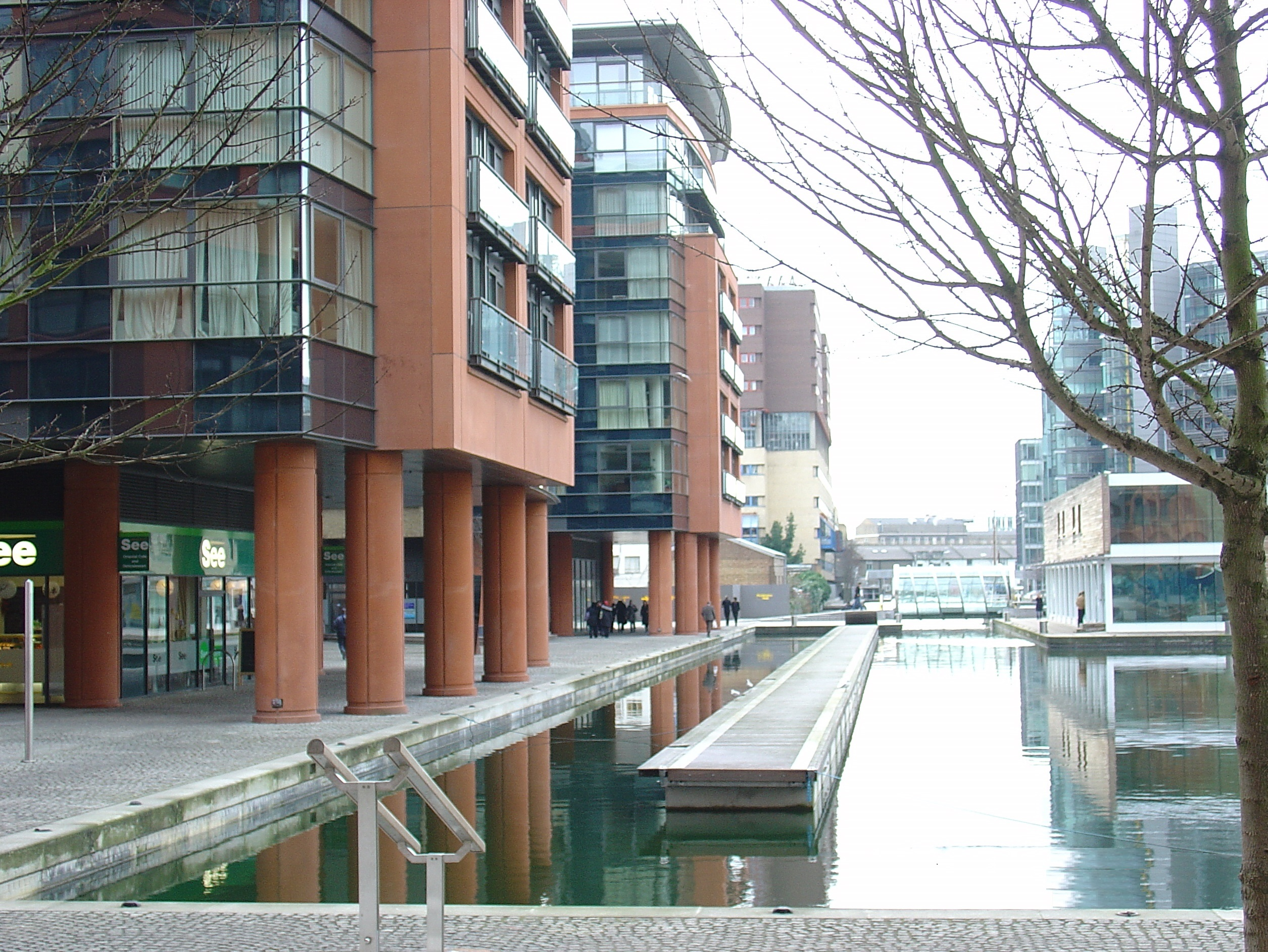
The St Mary's end in 2007

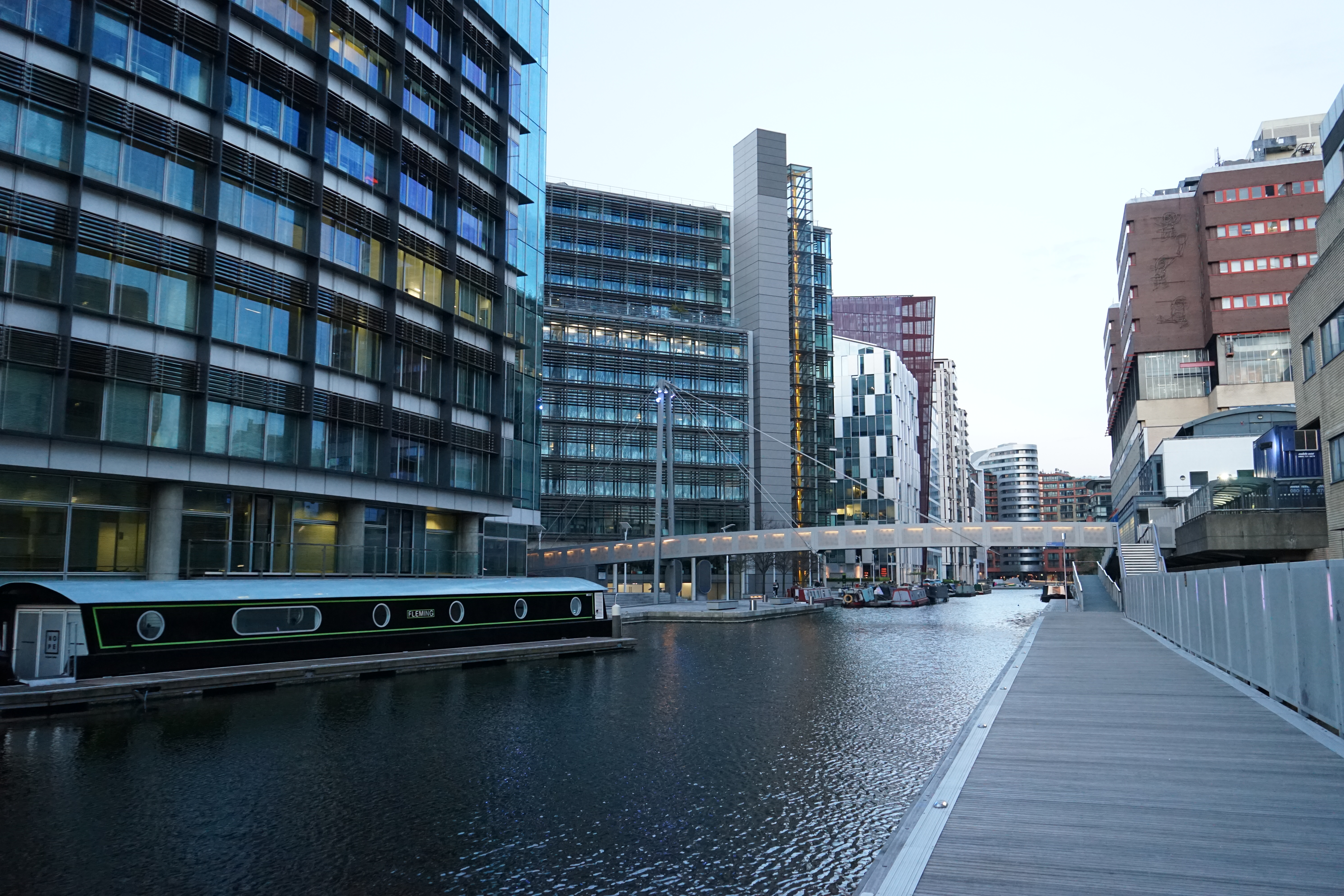
View from west in 2017

The contractors of a developers' consortium in partnership with the Canal and River Trust (and its predecessor British Waterways) in 2000 drained, cleaned and repaired the basin. In the latter half of the 20th century the basin attracted small and medium-sized commercial offices and is in part lined by specialist and private healthcare wings of St Mary's Hospital. The basin has become home to a wide range of companies, such as Marks & Spencer, the head office of which moved from Baker Street in 2004.

Most of the land north of the canal basin forms the 2010s development Merchant Square, North Wharf Road. Its main developer European Land and Property is a joint venture of Simon and David Reuben (the Reuben brothers) and the Jarvis family. In all, the development around Paddington Basin is creating 2,000,000 sq ft (190,000 m^{2}) of offices, homes, shops and leisure facilities. Its western buildings were mainly complete and occupied by 2018.

Completed building

- Paddington Walk is a block of 232 flats designed by Munkenbeck & Marshall that completed in August 2005.
- The Point (224,000 sq ft) and Waterside (240,000 sq ft) are office blocks designed by Terry Farrell and Partners and the Richard Rogers Partnership respectively.

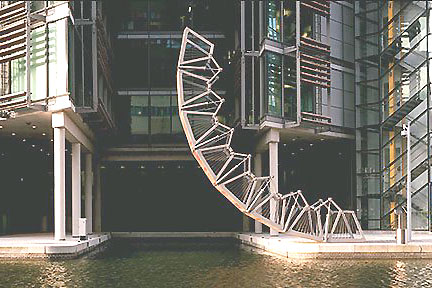
The Rolling Bridge in Paddington Basin curls up to let boats through.

The original plan for the eastern end envisaged a commercial development focused around the Grand Union Basin and included the Winding building and the Grand Union building. The Richard Rogers Partnership originally designed the latter as three towers of 24, 32 and 40 floors rising to 164m, but the planners imposed a height limit of 100 metres (330 ft). The revised scheme comprised six linked blocks of 30 storeys totalling 860,000 sq ft (80,000 m^{2}) of mixed-use space, but the project was discarded when it looked like the site would be needed by the Health Campus (see below).

The Health Campus scheme collapsed in 2005 and in February 2006 the Paddington Development Corporation – which became European Land and Property Ltd – submitted a new planning application. Branded as Merchant Square, this proposed 1,800,000 sq ft (170,000 m^{2}) of mixed-use space spanning six buildings, including 554 residential units and 58% commercial space. Planning permission was granted on 1 March 2007. A revised planning application was subsequently submitted and was approved on 19 May 2011. 4 Merchant Square, a 16-storey block of 196 flats, designed by Tryfon Kalyvides Partnership, completed in 2013; 5 Merchant Square (formerly Carmine) is a 14-storey office block of 255,000 sq ft (23,700 m^{2}) designed by Mossessian and Partners which became fully let by 2015. Part of the building is occupied by Marks & Spencer, which also occupies the Waterside Building.

In late 2021, Premier Inn constructed their largest, non-airport, hotel in Greater London on the north bank of the basin. The development was completed in March 2022.

3 Merchant Square, a 21-storey development of 159 luxury apartments and 42 standard apartments, was completed in summer 2014. 1 Merchant Square is a residential tower of 42 storeys designed by Robin Partington Architects, currently under construction as of 2015, which will be the tallest building in the City of Westminster, containing just over 200 residential units, a 90-room boutique hotel and a sky bar. 2 Merchant Square will be a 16-storey office building providing 162,000 sq ft (15,100 m^{2}) of Grade A space with 4,400 sq ft (410 m^{2}) of retail space. 6 Merchant Square will offer 119 apartments over 15 floors.

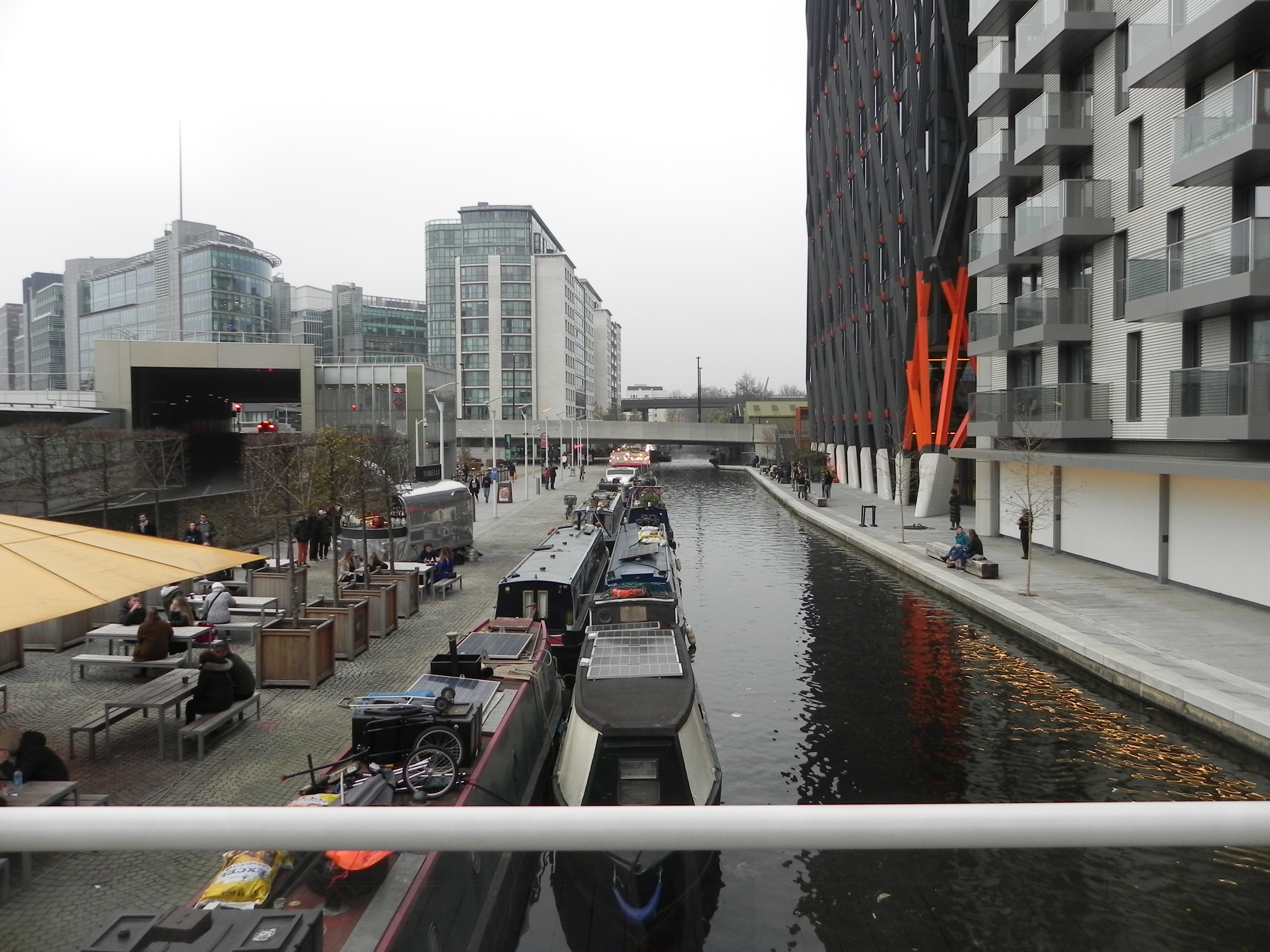
Paddington Basin from The Point Footbridge looking North towards Maida Vale (straight ahead), Paddington station (left) and Sheldon Square (left) in 2020

Merchant Square surrounds a central square. A life-size sculpture in memory of Sir Simon Milton was unveiled in September 2014 by Rt. Hon. Eric Pickles MP, Secretary of State for Communities and Local Government. The sculpture, designed by Bruce Denny, follows Sir Simon's pivotal role in facilitating the regeneration of Paddington Basin.

=== Pedestrian bridges ===
The basin has creatively designed pedestrian bridges:

- The Rolling Bridge
- The Fan Bridge

The Fan Bridge opened in autumn 2014 and moves with the motion of a Japanese hand fan.

== Transport ==
The nearest London Underground stations are Edgware Road and Paddington, the latter also being served by National Rail.

== See also ==
- Canals of the United Kingdom
- History of the British canal system
- List of canal basins in the United Kingdom
