= Statue of Paddington Bear =

Statue in Paddington station, London

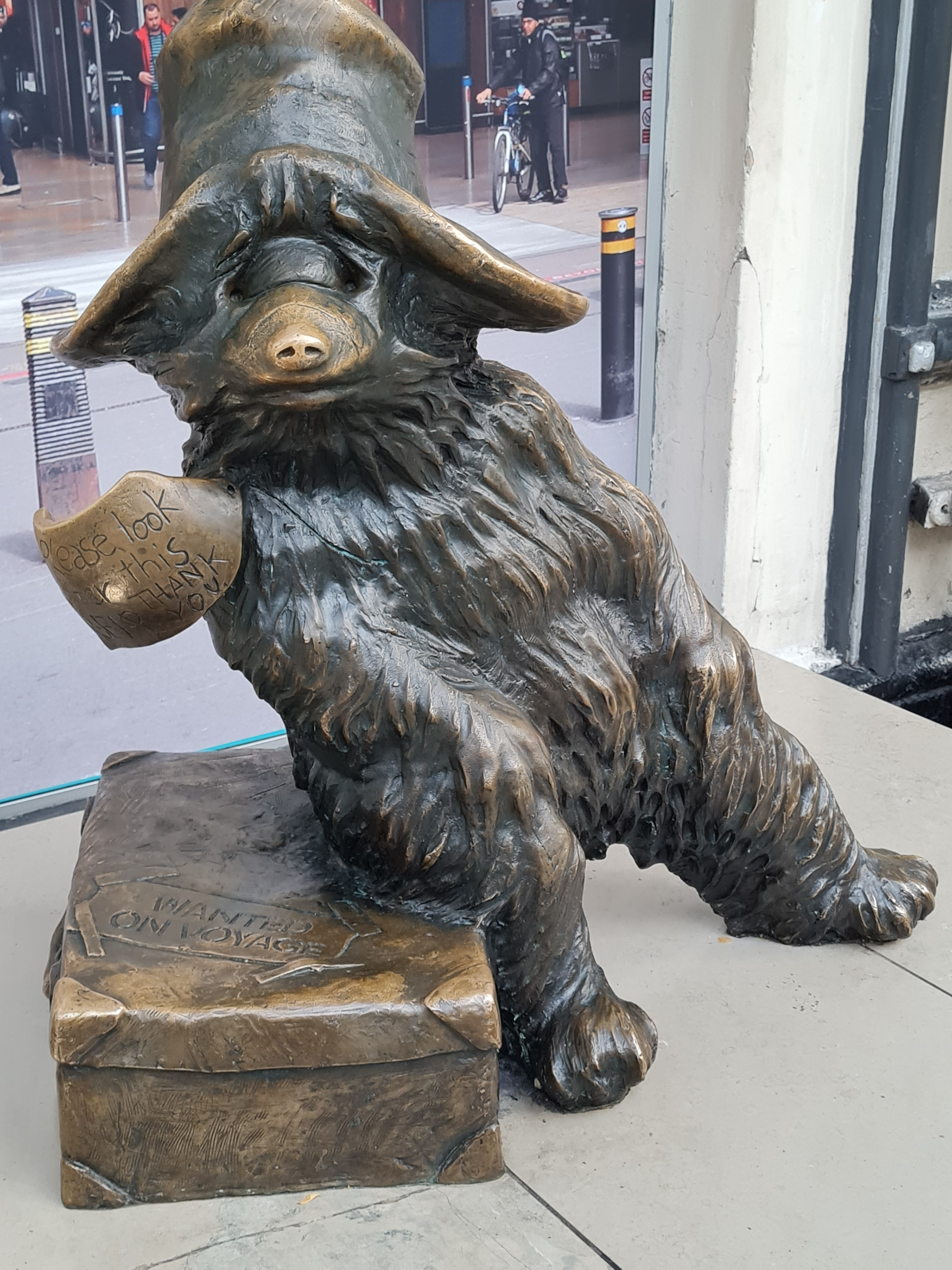
- The statue in 2023
- Artist: Marcus Cornish
- Completion date: 2000
- Type: Sculpture
- Medium: Bronze
- Subject: Paddington Bear
- Location: Paddington station, London; 51.5171°N 0.1774°W

The statue of Paddington Bear at London Paddington station is a bronze sculpture by Marcus Cornish erected in 2000. It marks the association between the character Paddington Bear and the station from which his name derives.

== Paddington Bear ==
The author Michael Bond created Paddington Bear in 1958. Inspired by his purchase of a teddy bear as a Christmas present for his wife, and naming the bear Paddington as the couple lived near Paddington Station, Bond imagined the arrival of a real bear at the station in his first novel, A Bear Called Paddington.

Paddington travels to London from Lima, Peru, stowed away in the life boat of a transatlantic vessel, equipped only with a small suitcase, some marmalade sandwiches and a note attached to his coat which reads, "Please look after this bear. Thank you". Adopted by the Brown family, he undergoes a series of adventures, published in thirty volumes between 1958 and 2018. The last in the series, Paddington's Finest Hour, was published posthumously, following Bond's death at the age of 91 on 27 June 2017.

== Paddington station ==
Paddington Station, the London terminus for the "grandest railway in England", the Great Western Railway, opened in 1854. It was designed by the GWR's own architect, Isambard Kingdom Brunel. Brunel was assisted by Matthew Digby Wyatt in the architectural detailing but the construction design was Brunel's alone. He was influenced by Sir Joseph Paxton's design for the Crystal Palace, particularly in relation to the glazed roofs. The station is a Grade I listed building.

== Description ==
The sculpture was created by Marcus Cornish in 2000. Cast in bronze, it was unveiled by Michael Bond on 24 February 2000. Bond's obituary in The Guardian described the statue as "one of the few memorials in London to inspire real affection".

In 2014 the statue was moved to a new location on Platform 1 beneath the station clock, and a commemorative plaque was installed nearby. It was later moved to the station's entrance near Praed Street; then, in August 2022, it returned to Platform 1 close to its earlier position.

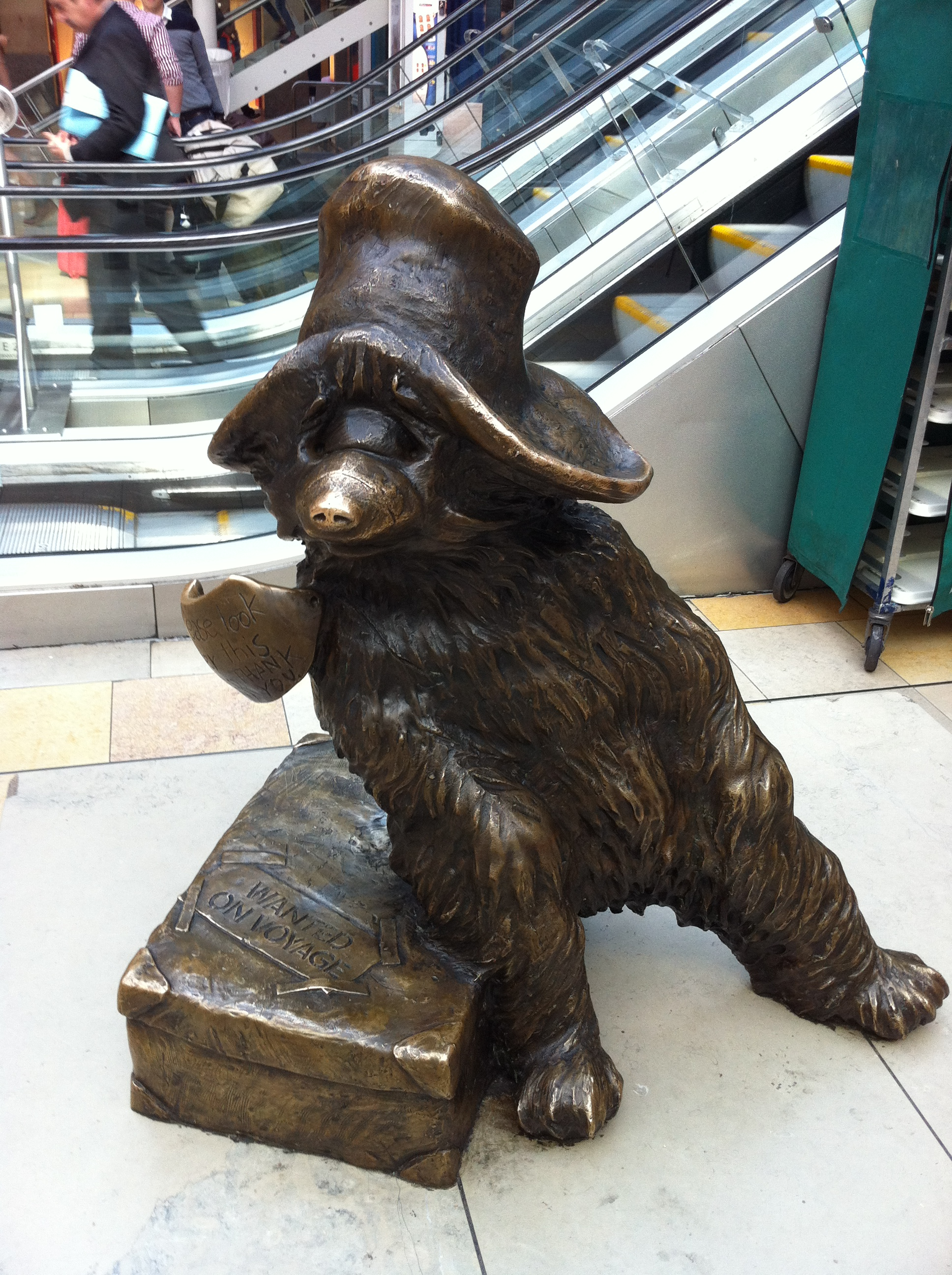
The statue in its original location, in 2012

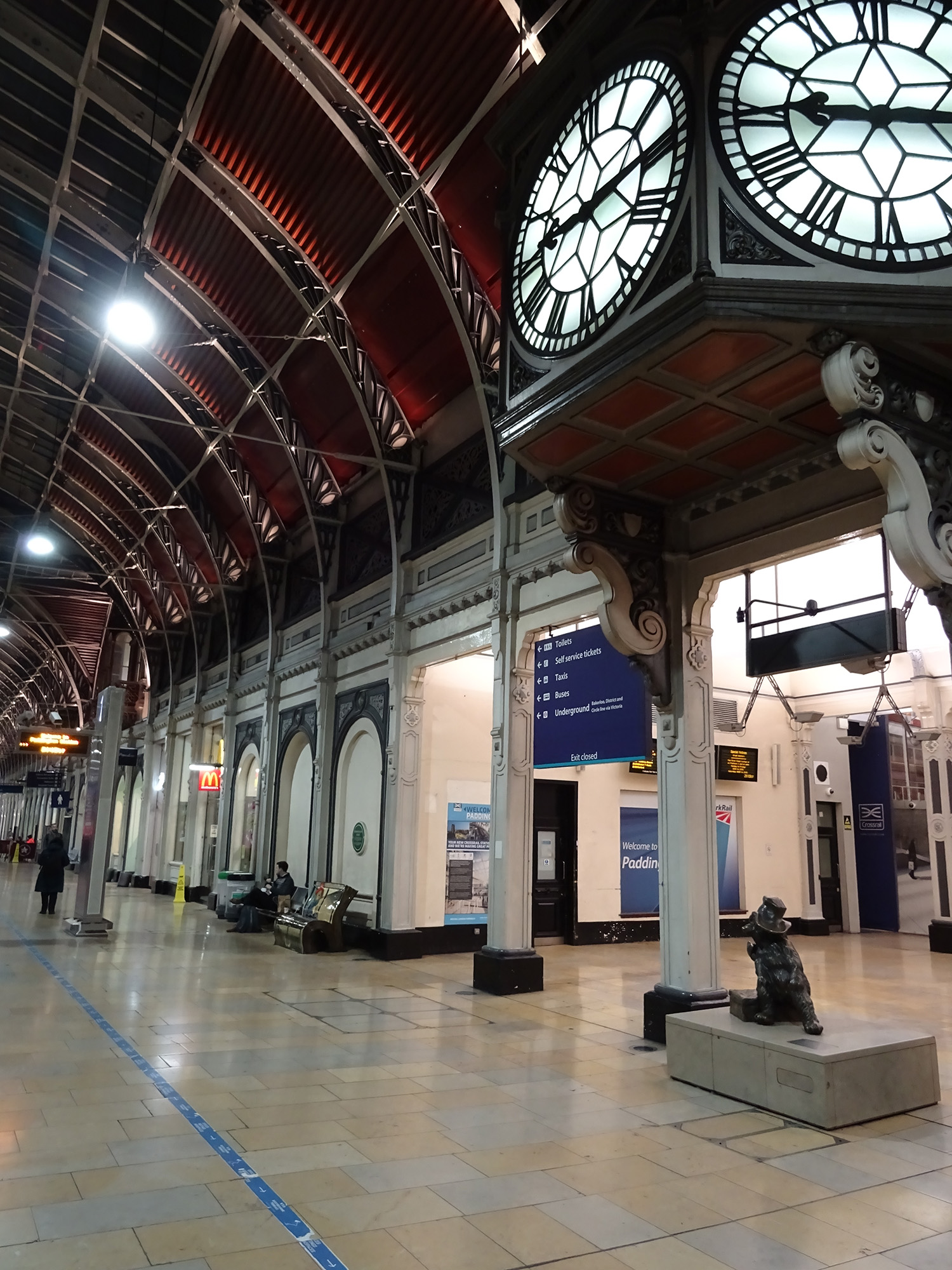
Platform 1 in 2018, with the statue beneath the clock

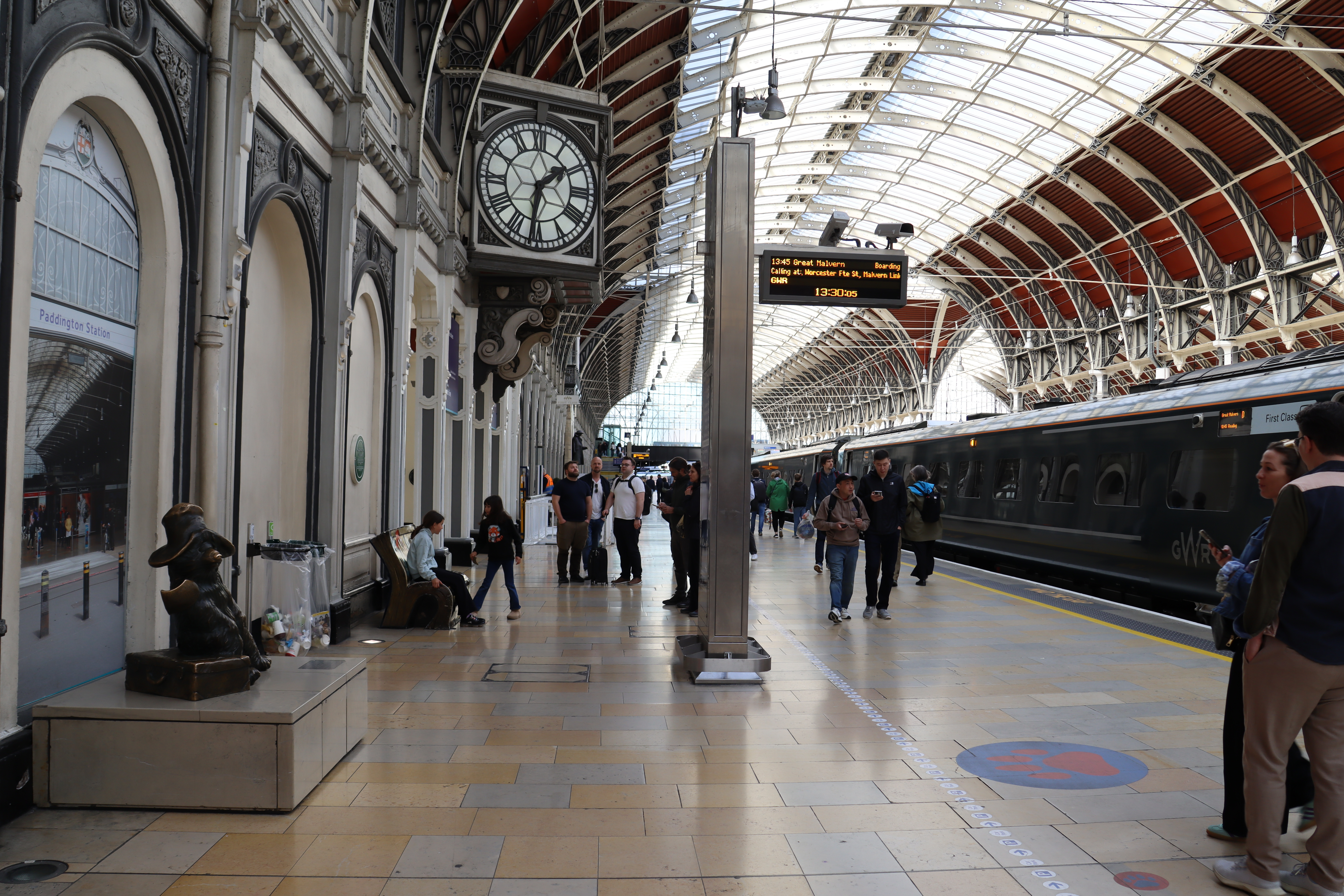
Platform 1 in 2026

== See also ==
- List of public art in Paddington § Paddington station for other artworks at the station, including the Paddington Bear Book Bench
- Great Western Railway War Memorial, also on Platform 1 at Paddington station

== Sources ==
- Cherry, Bridget; Pevsner, Nikolaus (2002). London 3: North West. The Buildings of England. Yale University Press. ISBN 978-0-300-09652-1.
