= Paddington Waterside =

Development in London, England

Coordinates: 51°31′7″N 0°10′40″W

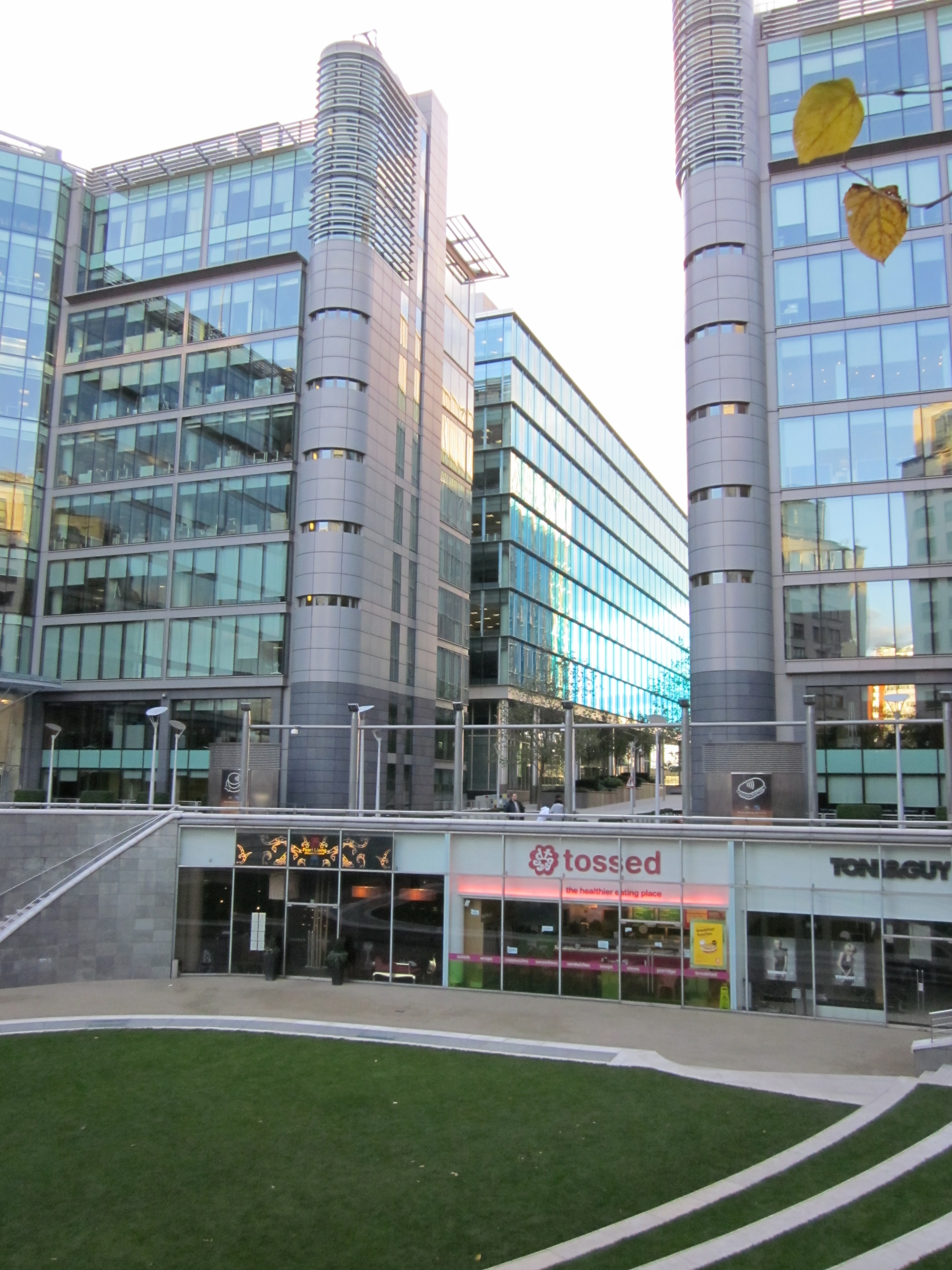
Looking down Kingdom Street from the amphitheatre in Sheldon Square, Paddington Central

Paddington Waterside is a developed area around Paddington Station in London.

The Paddington Special Policy Area covers a region almost the size of Soho, creating about 10,000,000 square feet (930,000 m^{2}) of space between 1998 and 2018. Coordinated by the Paddington Waterside Partnership, it consists of 13 individual projects in the triangle of land between Praed Street, Westbourne Terrace and the A40 Westway, most notably Paddington Central (previously styled PaddingtonCentral) and Paddington Basin. In 2000, The Independent described it as "the largest central London redevelopment scheme since the Second World War".

== History ==
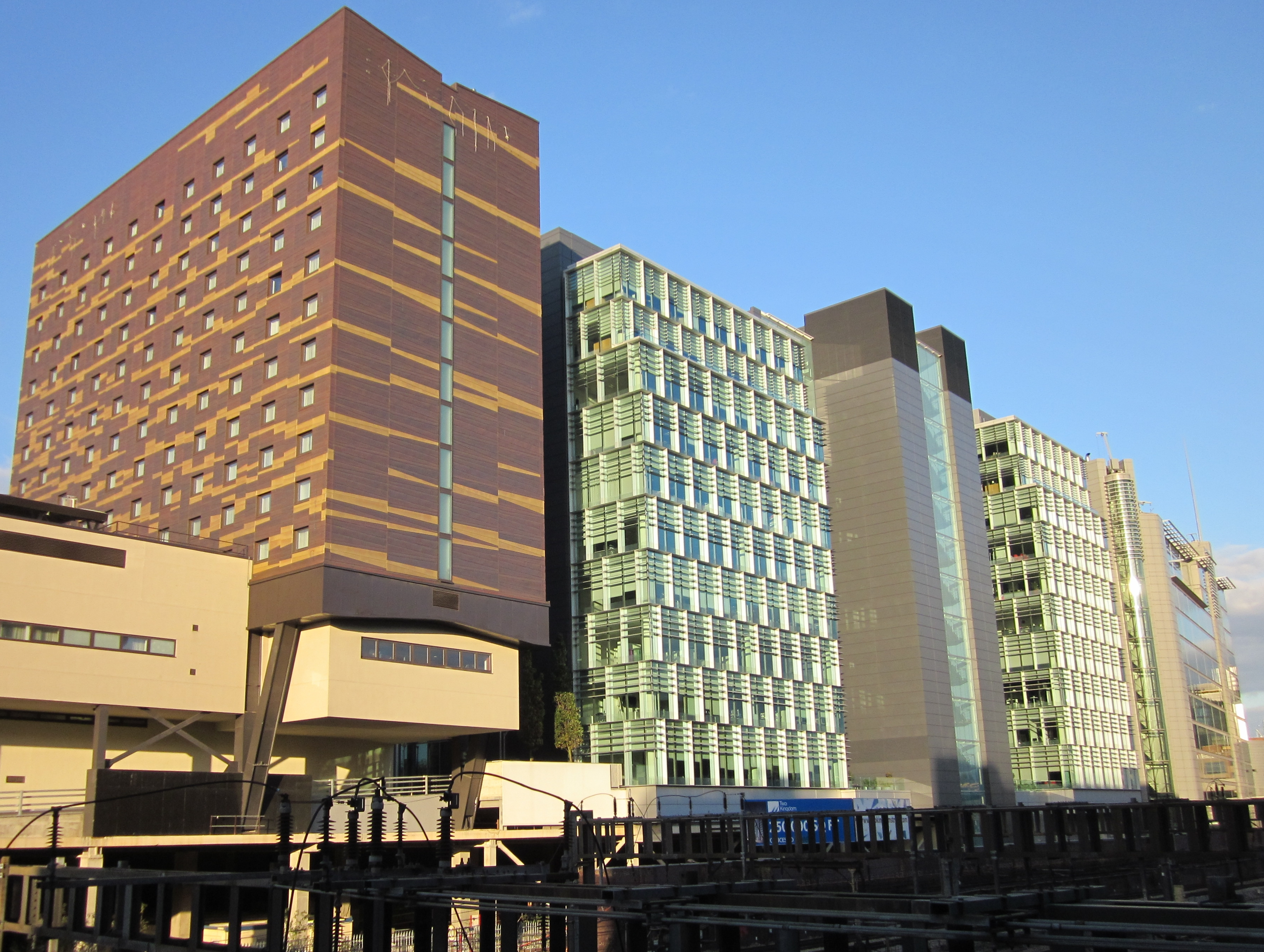
One and Three Kingdom Street from the south.

The Paddington Arm of the Grand Junction Canal opened on 10 July 1801, linking Paddington to the Bull's Bridge junction near the future site of Heathrow Airport. The Grand Junction (now part of the Grand Union Canal) was the final link in a chain of canals that reduced the distance from London to Birmingham from 269.5 miles (434 km) in 1789 to 138.5 miles (223 km) in 1805; terminating the canal at Paddington gave easy access to main roads into London and the level route meant no locks were needed on its 13.5-mile (22 km) length. In contrast, the Regent's Canal needed 12 locks for the 86-foot (26 m) descent from Paddington to the Thames at Limehouse.

The canal was an instant success, with warehouses and housing springing up around it. Canal traffic increased further when the Regent's Canal linked Paddington to the Port of London in 1820, but Paddington Basin was "practically killed" as a port as business was lost to wharves such as City Road Basin that were closer to the docks and the City of London. Paddington regained importance as a transport interchange with the arrival of the railway in 1838.

Canal traffic transferred to the railways during the nineteenth century and fell away completely after World War II; the closure of the Regent's Canal Dock in 1969 marked the coup de grâce. A similar switch from rail to road in the second half of the twentieth century left the Paddington goods yards redundant by the early 1980s. The land became derelict, with no public access to the canal land until 1987. The Paddington Special Policy Area was designated in 1988. The terminus of the Paddington Arm of the Grand Union Canal was originally known as the Paddington Basin and all the land to the south was developed into housing and commercial property and titled The Grand Junction Estate. The majority of the housing was bounded by Praed Street, Sussex Gardens, Edgware Road and Norfolk Place. Land and buildings not used for the canal undertaking remained after 1929 with the renamed Grand Junction Company, which functioned as a property company. While retaining its own name, it was taken over in 1972 by the Amalgamated Investment and Property Company, which went into liquidation in 1976. Prior to the liquidation the Welbeck Estate Securities Group acquired the entire estate comprising 525 houses 15 shops and the Royal Exchange public House in Sale Place.

The Paddington Regeneration Partnership, later the Paddington Waterside Partnership, was formed in 1998 to coordinate the regeneration of the area, now designated as the Paddington Special Policy Area. This followed the establishment of the King's Cross Partnership in 1996 to develop a similar mix of railway and canal land around King's Cross station, a project that became known as King's Cross Central. The first plans for Paddington envisaged 10,000,000 square feet (930,000 m^{2}) of new space, more than the original Canary Wharf development, in an area the size of Soho. This compares with the 505,000 sq ft (46,900 m^{2}) of 30 St Mary Axe (the "Gherkin") and 1,238,000 sq ft (115,000 m^{2}) of the skyscraper at One Canada Square. Outline planning permission for the western part of Paddington Basin was granted on 23 April 2001.

== Projects ==
=== Paddington Central ===
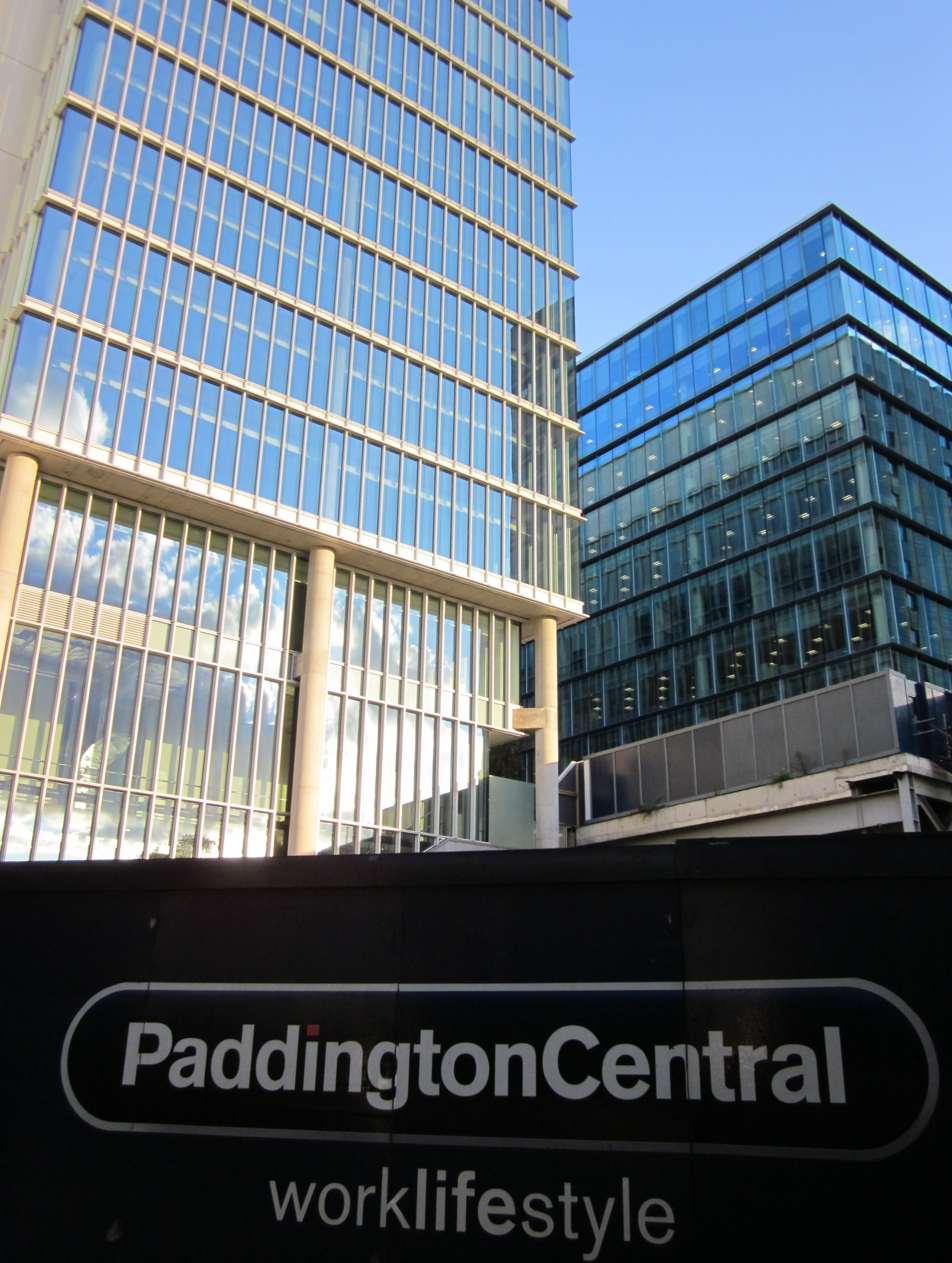
Two Kingdom Street from the north

Bishop's Bridge station, the original London passenger terminus of the Great Western Railway was on this site west of Bishop's Bridge Road. After Paddington was built, it was used for the railway's goods sheds until the 1980s. It is now a mixed-use development, with offices, flats and retail units. Phase I is Sheldon Square which is named after Sir Joseph Sheldon, a Lord Mayor of London who in 1678 rebuilt what became St Mary's Church on Paddington Green. Sheldon Square has 630,000 sq ft (59,000 m^{2}) of built space built around a grass amphitheatre which features live music in summer. The biggest structures are two office blocks of 193,000 sq ft (17,900 m^{2}) and 145,000 sq ft (13,500 m^{2}) let to companies such as Prudential and Kingfisher; there are 219 flats and 95,000 sq ft (8,800 m^{2}) of retail space. Sheldon Square was designed by Sidell Gibson and developed as a joint venture between Development Securities, Insight Investment Management and Aviva Investors.

The second phase of development lies to the west, along Kingdom Street. One Kingdom Street is a 260,000 sq ft (24,000 m^{2}) office building completed in February 2008 and occupied by Misys, Statoil, MWB and Vodafone. It was designed by Sheppard Robson and developed by Development Securities, Aviva Investors and Union Investment. Two Kingdom Street was due for completion in spring 2010 with AstraZeneca as the first tenant and has 235,000 sq ft (21,800 m^{2}) of office space with 25,000 sq ft (2,300 m^{2}) of residential accommodation. It was designed by Kohn Pedersen Fox and developed by Development Securities, Aviva Investors and Quinlan Private. The Novotel London Paddington is a distinctive 206 bedroom hotel at Three Kingdom Street. The hotel was designed by Dexter Moren Associates and Kohn Pedersen Fox and opened in September 2008. It is a joint venture between Development Securities and Aviva Investors.

In January 2010, Westminster City Council granted detailed planning permission for the final phase of the development, Four and Five Kingdom Street. They will provide 140,000 sq ft (13,000 m^{2}) and 210,000 sq ft (20,000 m^{2}) of office space respectively.

Paddington Arm British Waterways intends to encourage activity on and around the canal north of the Westway up to Little Venice, with floating galleries, cafés and restaurants.

=== 55–65 North Wharf Road and Telstar ===
Derwent London is employing Fletcher Priest as the architect for two sites off Bishop's Bridge Road, either side of the railway station. Planning permission was granted in January 2008 for two buildings at 55–65 North Wharf Road, a 240,000 sq ft (22,000 m^{2}) office block and a block of 100 flats east of the station. An eight-storey office block of 105,000 sq ft (9,800 m^{2}) has been built at 2 Eastbourne Terrace and is the London headquarters of the Rio Tinto Group. It stands on the site of Telstar House, a 1960s office block by Richard Seifert that suffered a major fire on 29 July 2003.

=== 10–50 Eastbourne Terrace ===
Further down Eastbourne Terrace, Land Securities have refurbished numbers 10, 20 and 30. In 2009 they sold numbers 40 and 50, 146,000 sq ft (13,600 m^{2}) of retail and office space. Westlink Global Investment Ltd, 60% owned by AMDB Bhd of Malaysia, paid £50.5m for a net rental yield of 8.65% based on the 94% occupancy at the time.

=== Triangle Site ===
The construction of the Elizabeth Line station to the west of Paddington Station means that the existing taxi rank has been moved north of the station and opened in spring 2011. A new entrance for the mainline station and a new ticket hall for the Hammersmith and City line has been constructed next to the canal.

=== Paddington Station ===
Nicholas Grimshaw oversaw a £65m facelift of the mainline station that added 50,000 sq ft (4,600 m^{2}) of retail and catering space. The Edwardian glass roof of Span 4 was refurbished at a cost of £26m, and returned to public view in July 2011. New underground platforms were constructed for the Elizabeth line, which entered service in May 2022.

=== Paddington Basin and Merchant Square ===
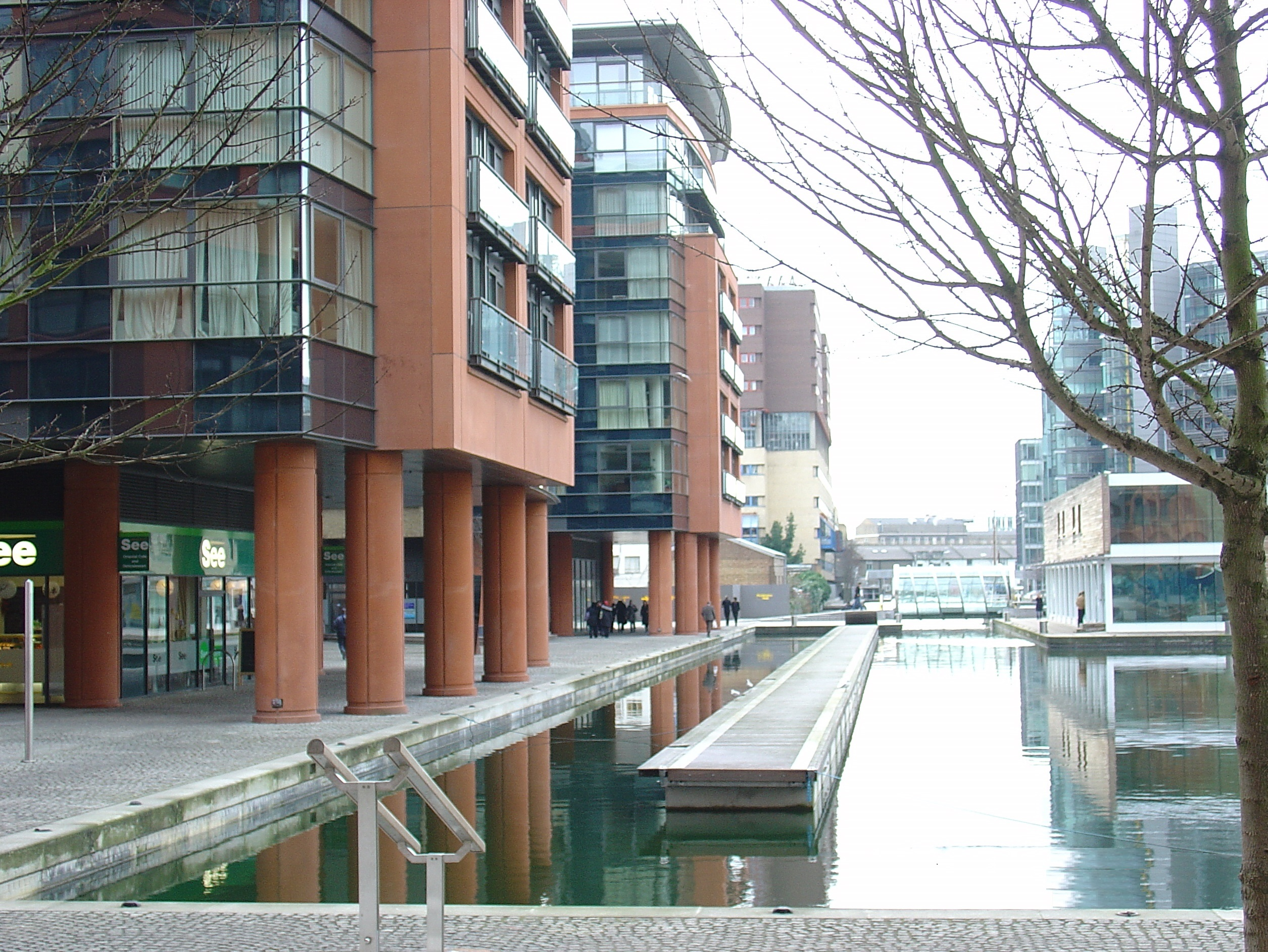
Paddington Basin

Most of the land north of the canal basin is being developed under the banner of Merchant Square by European Land and Property as part of a joint venture between Simon and David Reuben (the Reuben brothers) and the Jarvis family. In all, the development around Paddington Basin will create 2,000,000 sq ft (190,000 m^{2}) of offices, homes, shops and leisure facilities, with the western end being developed first. Paddington Walk is a block of 232 flats designed by Munkenbeck & Marshall that completed in August 2005. The Point (224,000 sq ft) and Waterside (240,000 sq ft) are office blocks designed by Terry Farrell and Partners and the Richard Rogers Partnership respectively.

The original plan for the eastern end envisaged a commercial development focused around the Grand Union Basin and included the Winding building and the Grand Union building. The Richard Rogers Partnership originally designed the latter as three towers of 24, 32 and 40 floors rising to 164m, but the planners imposed a height limit of 100 metres (330 ft). The revised scheme comprised six linked blocks of 30 storeys totalling 860,000 sq ft (80,000 m^{2}) of mixed-use space, but the project was discarded when it looked like the site would be needed by the Health Campus (see below).

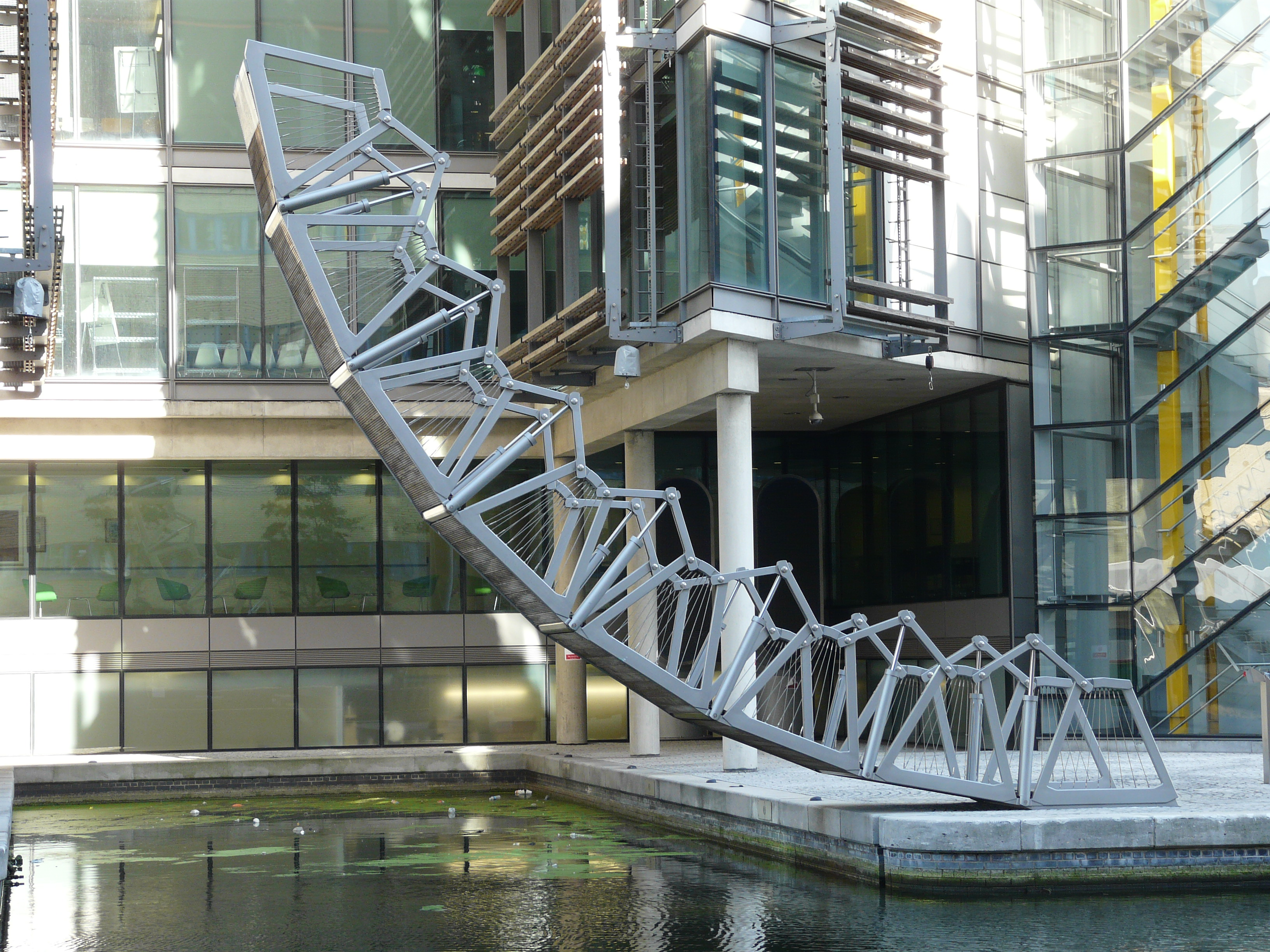
The Rolling Bridge in Paddington Basin

The Health Campus scheme collapsed in 2005 and in February 2006 the Paddington Development Corporation – now European Land and Property Ltd – submitted a new planning application. Branded as Merchant Square, this proposed 1,800,000 sq ft (170,000 m^{2}) of mixed-use space spanning 6 buildings, including 554 residential units and 58% commercial space. Planning permission was granted on 1 March 2007. A revised planning application was subsequently submitted and was approved on 19 May 2011. 4 Merchant Square, a 16-storey block of 196 flats, designed by Tryfon Kalyvides Partnership, is now complete; 5 Merchant Square (formerly Carmine) is a 14-storey office block of 255,000 sq ft (23,700 m^{2}) designed by mossessian & partners and part-occupied by Marks & Spencer, which also occupies the Waterside Building.

3 Merchant Square, a 21-storey development of 159 luxury apartments and 42 standard apartments, is due for completion in summer 2014. 1 Merchant Square will be a residential tower of 42 storeys designed by Robin Partington Architects, which will be the tallest building in the City of Westminster, containing just over 200 residential units, a 90-room boutique hotel and a sky bar. 2 Merchant Square will be a 16-storey office building providing 162,000 sq ft (15,100 m^{2}) of Grade A space with 4,400 sq ft (410 m^{2}) of retail space. 6 Merchant Square will offer 119 apartments over 15 floors.

A large square by the canal is planned for Merchant Square, along with business and retail barges moored alongside. The basin is known for its ingenious pedestrian bridges, such as The Rolling Bridge and the Fan Bridge, which has been operational since autumn 2014 and opens with the motion of a Japanese hand fan.

=== North Wharf Gardens ===
View down Hermitage Street of North Wharf Gardens Site 1

Sandwiched between the Westway and the canal basin, the 1.5-hectare site of the former North Westminster Community School was omitted from the Paddington Special Policy Area as it was expected to remain in use for education. The decision to build the Paddington Academy and Westminster Academy left the site available for redevelopment when the City of Westminster College moved to a new campus at the end of 2010. The planning brief proposed that "around 80% of gross internal area delivered on the site should be allocated for residential use, with public open space, and supporting active uses that provide local employment."

In April 2012 Westminster City Council sold the site to Amwaj Property Limited, of Bahrain, which commissioned London-based Assael Architecture to design a residentially-oriented mixed-use development, the first phase of which was scheduled for completion in 2015 at an estimated cost of £71 million.

=== Paddington Health Campus and St Mary's Hospital ===
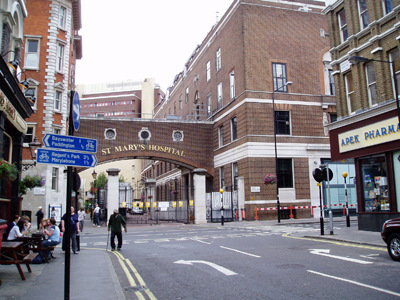
St Mary's Hospital

St Mary's is a major teaching hospital with a long tradition of biomedical research, from the first synthesis of heroin to the discovery of penicillin. It is housed in buildings dating back to 1845 between Praed Street and Paddington Basin. In October 2000, the London Regional Office of the NHS approved a plan for a Paddington Health Campus that would replace three run-down hospitals – St Marys, the Royal Brompton and Harefield. The initial cost was estimated at £411m at 2005 prices with completion in 2006, to be financed by PFI, but it became apparent that the scheme was too big for the original St Mary's site. Various locations north of the canal basin were investigated but the scheme was finally abandoned in May 2005 after costs had spiralled to £894m and the completion date put back to 2013. £15m was spent on the project, leading a member of the Commons Public Accounts Committee to describe it as "an object lesson in how not to build hospitals....a shambles of the first order", and a colleague called it "incompetence on a massive scale".

The land north of the canal that had been earmarked for the Health Campus became the Merchant Square development in Paddington Basin (see above). The planning application was formally withdrawn in May 2008 but St Mary's remains part of the Paddington Waterside Partnership. The only recent development work has been a £15m upgrade of the QEQM Wing.

=== Hilton London Paddington ===
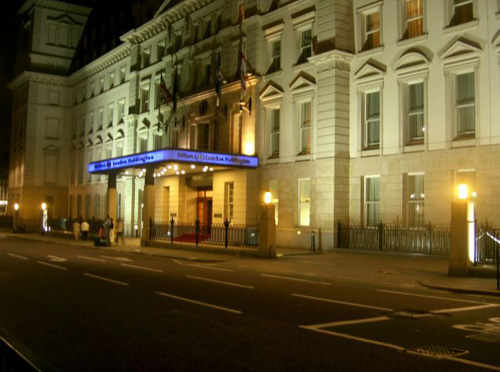
Hilton London Paddington

The Great Western Royal Hotel on Praed Street was built as the station hotel in 1854. Muirgold Limited gave it a £60m refurbishment in 2002 and it was rebranded as the Hilton London Paddington.

=== Sorting Office ===
The Royal Mail closed their sorting office in Praed Street in March 2010 and moved the counter service to West End Quay. A commercial development is envisaged for the site, along with a new ticket hall for the Bakerloo line and better access to the mainline station.

=== West End Quay ===
Rialto Homes and WestCity built three blocks of flats at the east end of the canal basin that were completed in 2003. West End Quay comprises 468 flats and 29,000 sq ft (2,700 m^{2}) of retail space, designed by Broadway Malyan.

=== Hilton London Metropole ===
The Metropole is a landmark hotel with 1058 bedrooms on the Edgware Road, next to the Marylebone flyover. Originally built in 1968, it was extended in 1986 and a conference centre was added in 1998–2000, making it the biggest convention hotel in Britain. Its 91-metre (299 ft) tower was the tallest building in the area for many years.
