= Marcus Cornish =

British sculptor

- Education: Camberwell School of Art, Royal College of Art
- Known for: Sculpture

Marcus Cornish is a contemporary British sculptor. After obtaining a First Class Honours degree in sculpture at Camberwell School of Art, he went on to gain a Master of Arts degree at the Royal College of Art. A scholarship enabled him to spend time in India, studying the work of traditional Aiyanar potter priests, and his Master's thesis was about their work crafting terracotta horses for Aiyanar shrines in Tamil Nadu. In 1993 he was elected a Member of the Royal British Society of Sculptors.

He spent time as official tour artist with the British Army in Kosovo, and again as official tour artist on a diplomatic tour of Eastern Europe by The Prince of Wales. He is an Academic Board member, and occasional tutor, of The Prince's Drawing School - a charitable trust founded by the Prince of Wales that provides a wide range of courses focused on drawing and painting skills.

== Works ==
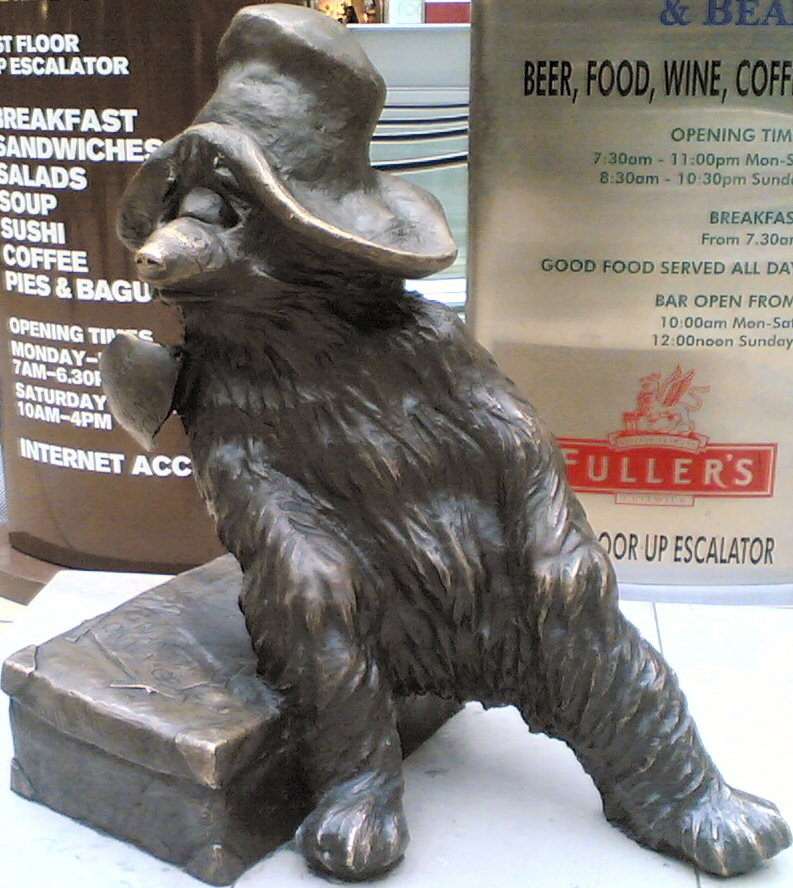
Paddington Bear

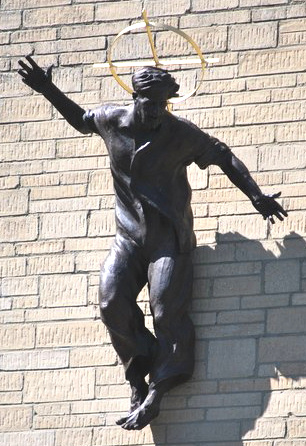
Jesus in Jeans

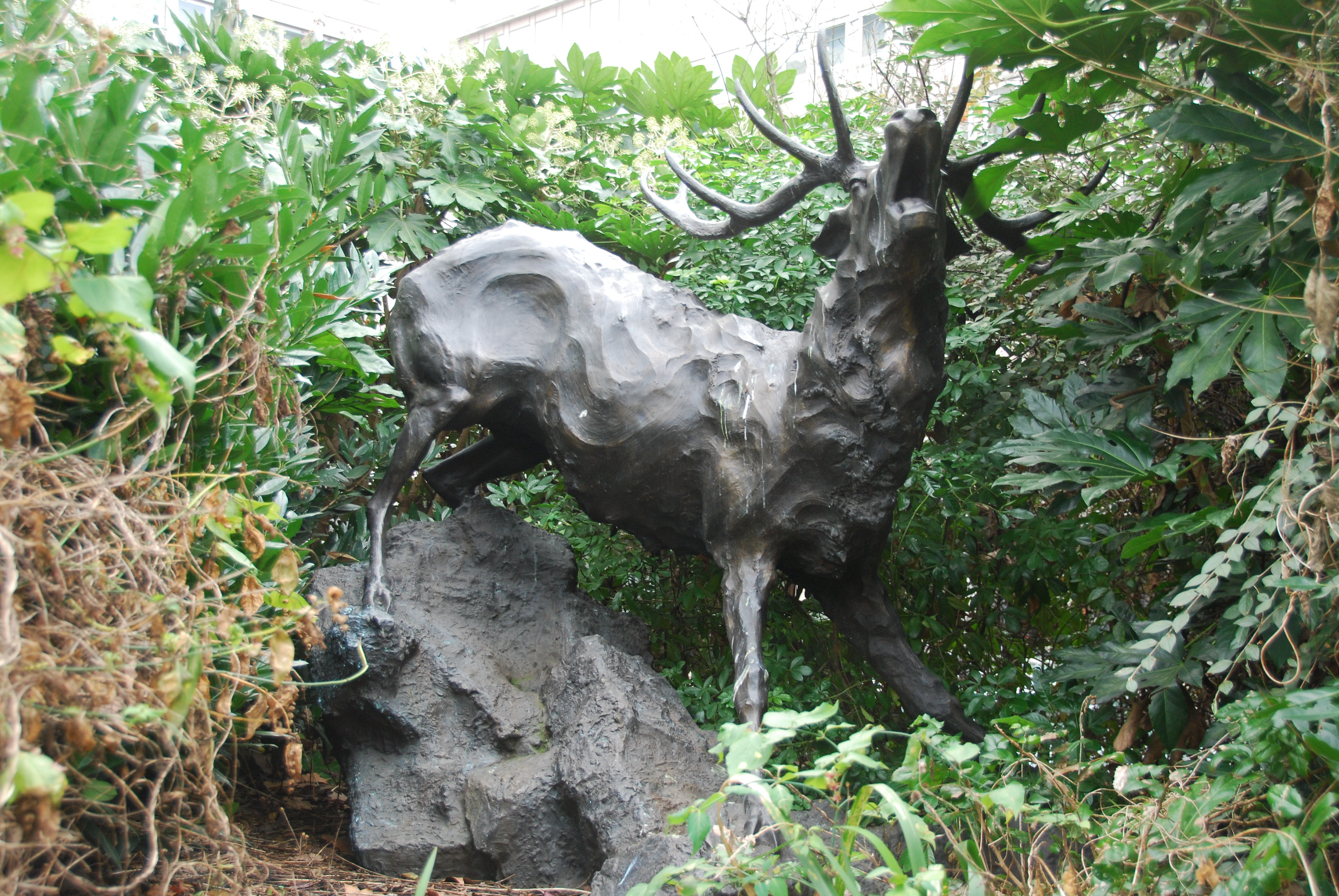
The Stag, St James's Square, London

In 2000, he created a life-size bronze statue of Paddington Bear, the fictional bear from Darkest Peru, that stands in Paddington Station in London.

He was commissioned by a property developer to create five bronze statues of Scottish wild animals. One of them, a greater-than-life-size statue of a red deer stag, was placed in St. James's Square, London, in 2002.

In 2004, he was involved in a collaborative project to create a memorial to recipients of the Victoria Cross and George Cross medals, which was installed in the Pillared Hall in the Ministry of Defence Main Building in Whitehall, London, and dedicated on 2 November 2004. The memorial consists of a stained glass window, designed and created by Rachel Foster and the Eastwood Senior Citizens Art Project Enterprise (ESCAPE), and a 16-foot high bronze column from which emerges, at the top, a powerful figure, 'Courage', designed and created by Marcus Cornish.

In 2005, he was Sculptor-in-Residence at the Museum of London, and subsequently exhibited the clay and plaster sculptures he created during that time and based on his observations and experience there, under the title "Impressions from a London Seam".

In 2008, he was commissioned to create a sculpture of St John the Evangelist for the parish church of that name in Heron's Ghyll in Sussex. The statue was dedicated on 11 January 2009 by Bishop Kieran Conry.

In 2008–2009, he was commissioned to create a bronze statue of Jesus Christ to mark the 50th anniversary of the Our Lady Immaculate and St Philip Neri Catholic Church in Uckfield, East Sussex. The statue, which was installed on the front of the church in May 2009, depicts a very contemporary figure, wearing a shirt and loose trousers. It was immediately dubbed "Jesus in Jeans" by the media, and was widely reported and commented on.

== See also ==
- Art of the United Kingdom
