= 1 Merchant Square =

- Interactive map of the 1 Merchant Square area

General information
- Status: Under construction
- Location: Paddington, London, England
- Coordinates: 51°31′09″N 0°10′16″W

Height
- Roof: 140 m (460 ft)

Technical details
- Floor count: 42

Website
- merchantsquare.co.uk/live-work/

1 Merchant Square is a 42-storey, 140 m tall building under construction in Paddington, London. When complete, it will be the tallest building in the City of Westminster, with a hotel and 222 apartments.

Planned were revised in 2019. The revised plans included a reduction in the number of hotel floors in favour of additional residential units, reflecting changes in the scheme approved by Westminster planners in 2019.
