= Robin Partington =

Robin Courtland Partington (born 5 August 1960) is a British architect; he led the design team for the Gherkin (30 St Mary Axe) when at Foster and Partners.

== Early life ==
He grew up in Lostock, Bolton in Greater Manchester, then in Lancashire, attending Bolton School then a direct grant grammar school, now and independent day school. His parents were architects, his father died in a sailing accident whilst he was very young and was brought up by his mother, who later remarried Ronald Bellis who owned Richard Hough Limited manufacturing Calendar Bowls in a factory in Nelson Square Bolton. He had wanted to become an aeronautical engineer and grew up surrounded by architects and engineers. School holidays were spent immersed in heavy engineering and cutting oil nurtured a fascination for the properties of materials, how things are made and a healthy respect for the craftsmanship and skills involved. He attended the University of Liverpool to gain his Part I RIBA Bachelor of Arts with Honours degree from 1978–81. He worked for a year at Scott Brownrigg in Surrey from 1981 to 1982, then completed his Part II RIBA degree Bachelor of Architecture with Honours at Liverpool from 1982–84. He joined Foster Associates now Foster + Partners in 1984 for his final year out completing his RIBA Part III in 1985. He became a director of Foster + Partners 1984 to 2001.

== Career ==
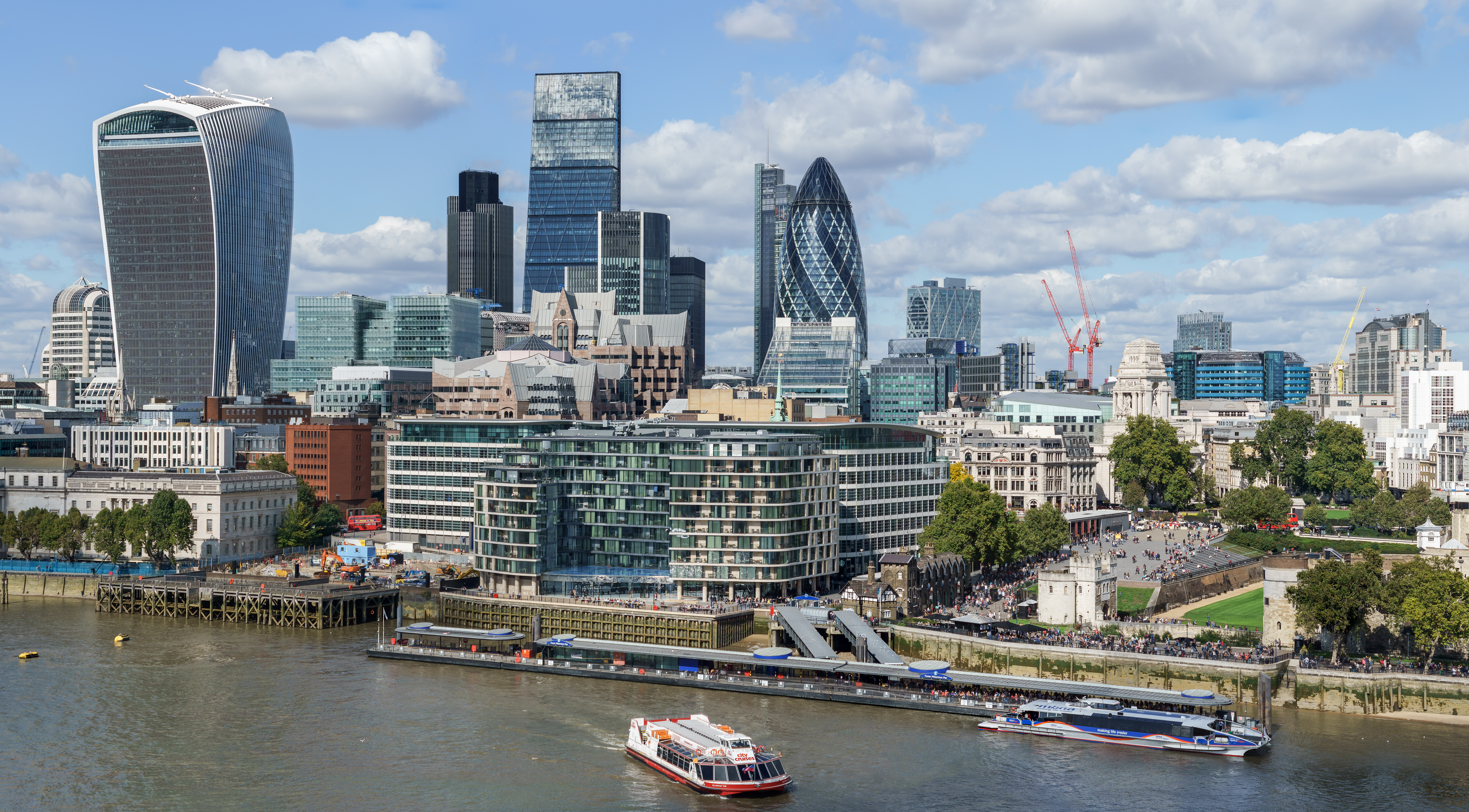
City of London, with The Gherkin in the centreground in September 2015

=== Foster + Partners ===
He joined Foster + Partners in 1984, then returned to Liverpool to gain his Part III RIBA qualification. He became a qualified architect, registered with RIBA and the Architects Registration Board (ARB). He would work for Foster + Partners for seventeen years 1984 - 2001.

=== Hamiltons Architects ===
He joined Hamiltons Architects in 2001, and was responsible for the transformation of the practice over the following 8 years 2001 - 2009. Whilst there he was responsible for a wide variety of award-winning projects before leaving to set up his own practice in 2009.

=== Apt Works Limited ===
In October 2009 an opportunity presented itself to start his own business. Despite the financial crisis at the time, the practice rapidly grew in its first year through the support of significant clients including Land Securities, Orion Land and Leisure and European Land and Property Limited. The company started life as Robin Partington Architects Limited, changing its name to Robin Partington & Partners to reflect the rapidly growing team and finally in 2018 the company became an Employee Ownership Trust, moving to its new offices at 235 St John Street in Clerkenwell, London. To celebrate the change in company structure, ownership and address we rebranded to Apt Works... because it does. The studio is an endless source of inspiration, filled with talented people and boundless energy. It is a place with great projects and wonderful opportunities, where clients and colleagues collaborate in a hugely rewarding process.

== Works ==
- 30 St Mary Axe (The Gherkin, 591 ft)
- Strata SE1 (Strata Tower, 467 ft)
- 1 Merchant Square (The Cucumber, under construction, 460 ft, the tallest building in the City of Westminster, next to the Westway or A40.

== Personal life ==
He lives in Paddington, London.

== See also ==
- List of tallest buildings in the United Kingdom
