= List of canal locks in the United Kingdom =

This is a selective list of canal locks in the United Kingdom which have unique features or are notable in some other way. This list is not comprehensive.

Lock	Canal	Grid Reference	Notes
Bath Locks	Kennet and Avon Canal	grid reference ST756643	Flight of six locks, in a quite ornate setting and including the UK's second deepest lock, two pumping stations and several Grade II listed buildings.
Bingley Five Rise Locks	Leeds and Liverpool Canal	grid reference SE107399	These staircase locks are the steepest flight of locks in the UK, with a gradient of about 1:5.
Bow Locks	River Lee Navigation	grid reference TQ383824	These locks are bidirectional to connect to the tidal Bow Creek.
Caen Hill Locks	Kennet and Avon Canal	grid reference ST978614	Flight of 29 locks, 16 of which form an impressively steep flight in a straight line up the hillside.
Fourteen Locks	Monmouthshire Canal	grid reference ST282885	Dramatic flight of narrow and very deep locks featuring a unique and complex series of interdependent pounds.
Foxton Locks	Grand Union Canal (Leicester Line)	grid reference SP691896	Two "staircases", each of five locks. Alongside the locks is the site of the Foxton Inclined Plane, built in 1900 as a solution to operational restrictions imposed by the lock flight.
King's Norton Stop Lock	Stratford-upon-Avon Canal	grid reference SP055794	Stop lock with two guillotine gates.
Neptune's Staircase	Caledonian Canal	grid reference NN113769	Staircase lock of eight locks constructed by Thomas Telford in 1811 lifting boats 64 feet (20 m).
Tardebigge Locks	Worcester and Birmingham Canal	grid reference SO973681	Longest flight in the UK. 30 locks rising 67m.
Tuel Lane Lock	Rochdale Canal	grid reference SE063237	Deepest lock in the United Kingdom, with a fall of 19' 8½".
Watford Locks	Grand Union Canal (Leicester Line)	grid reference SP592688	Staircase of four locks, within an overall flight of seven.

== Gallery ==
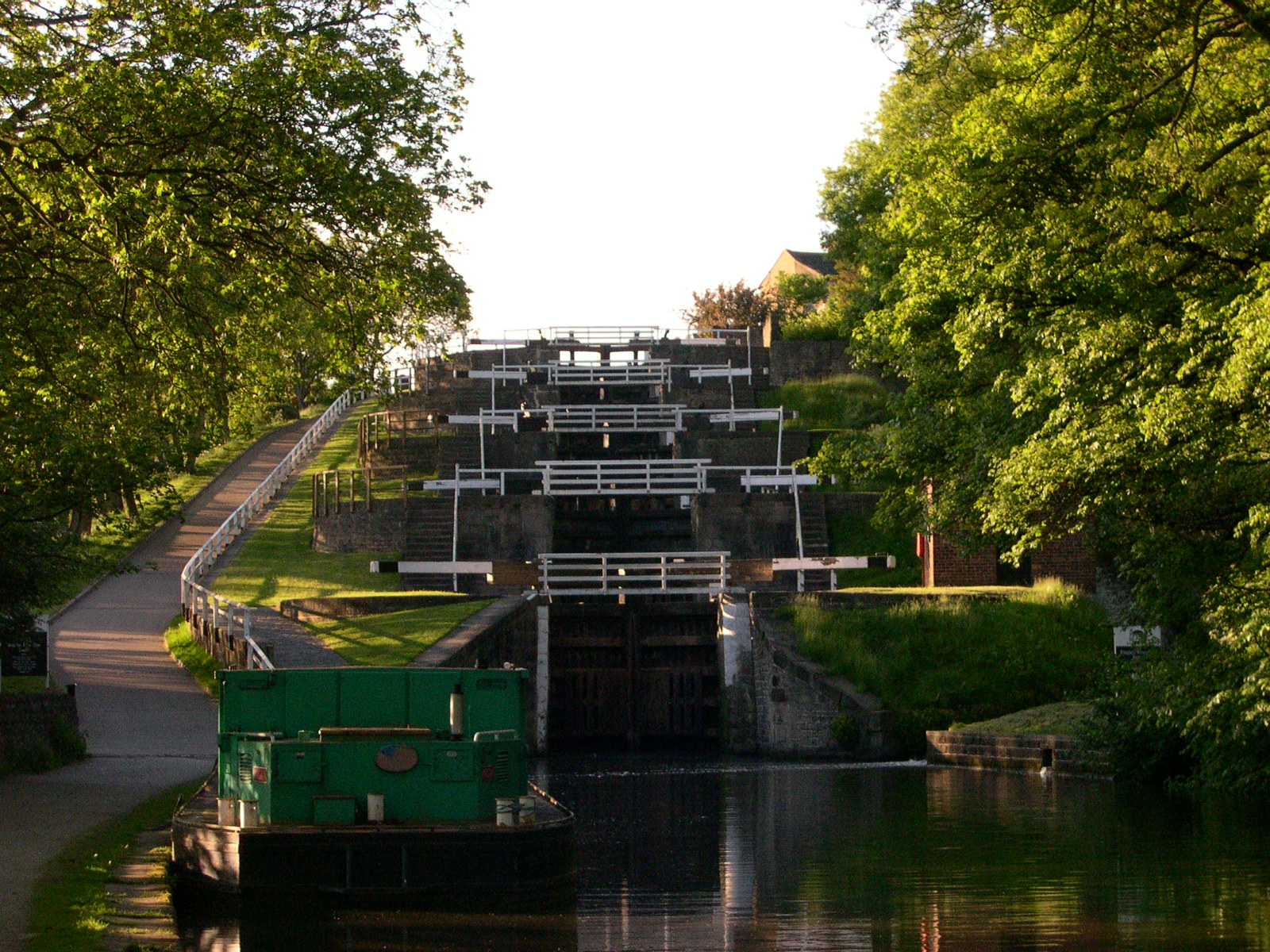
Bingley Five Rise

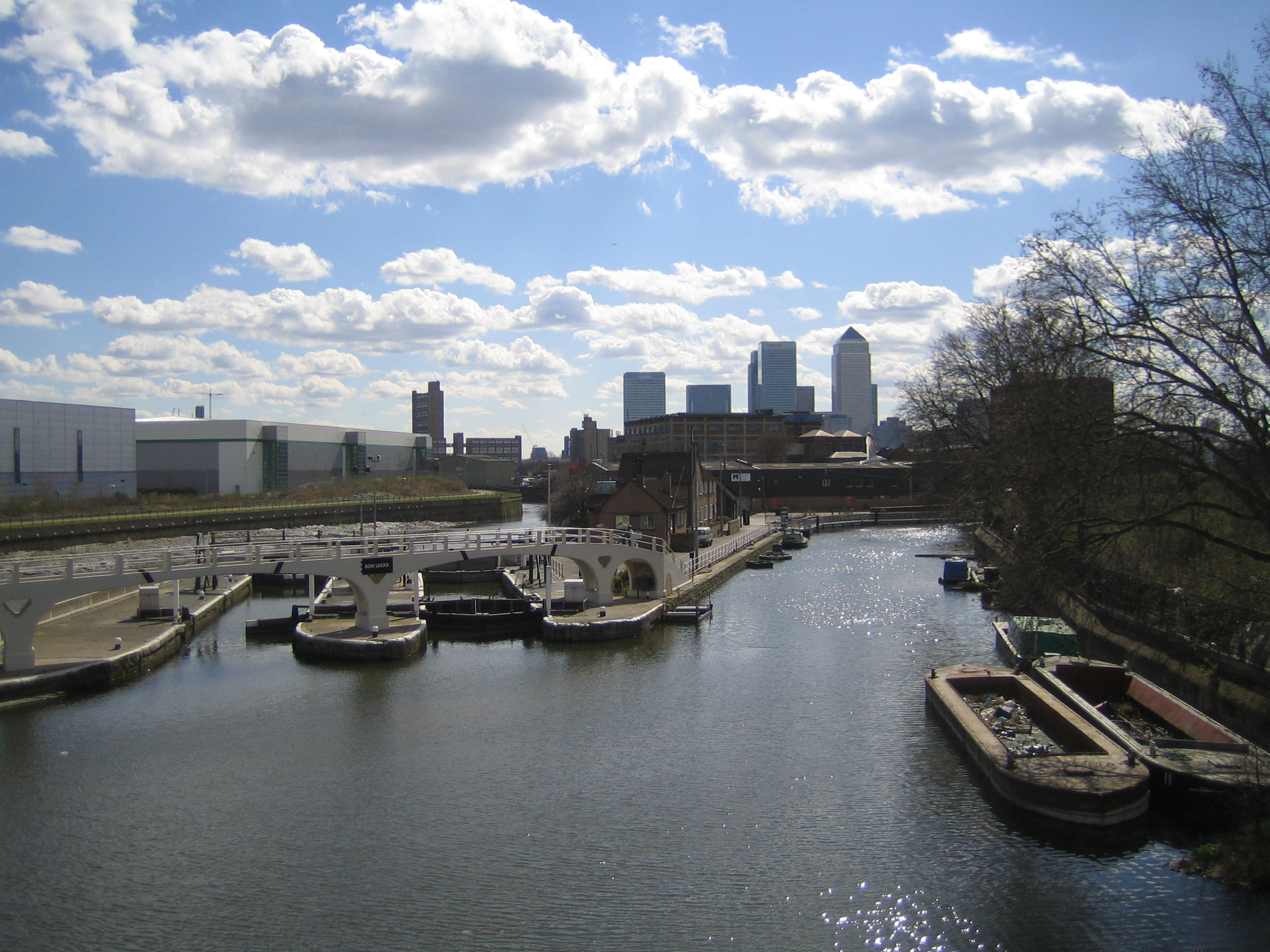
Bow Locks

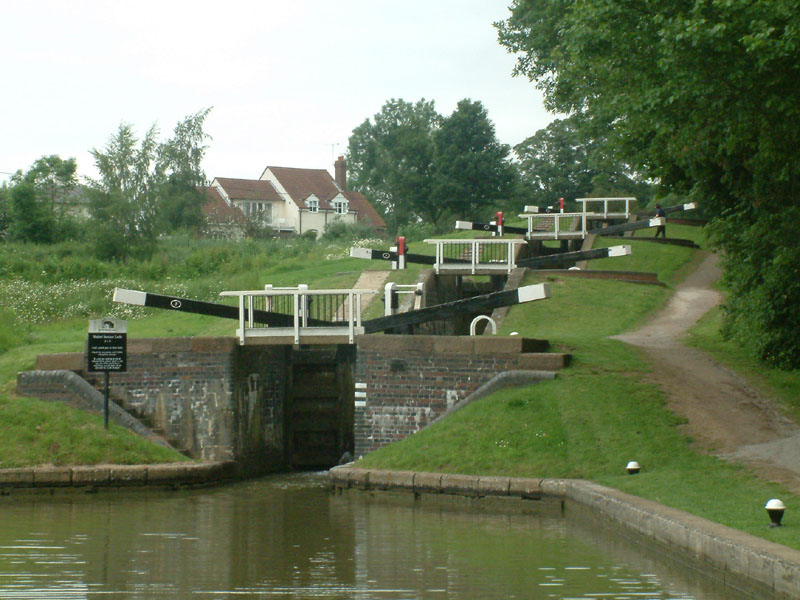
Watford Locks

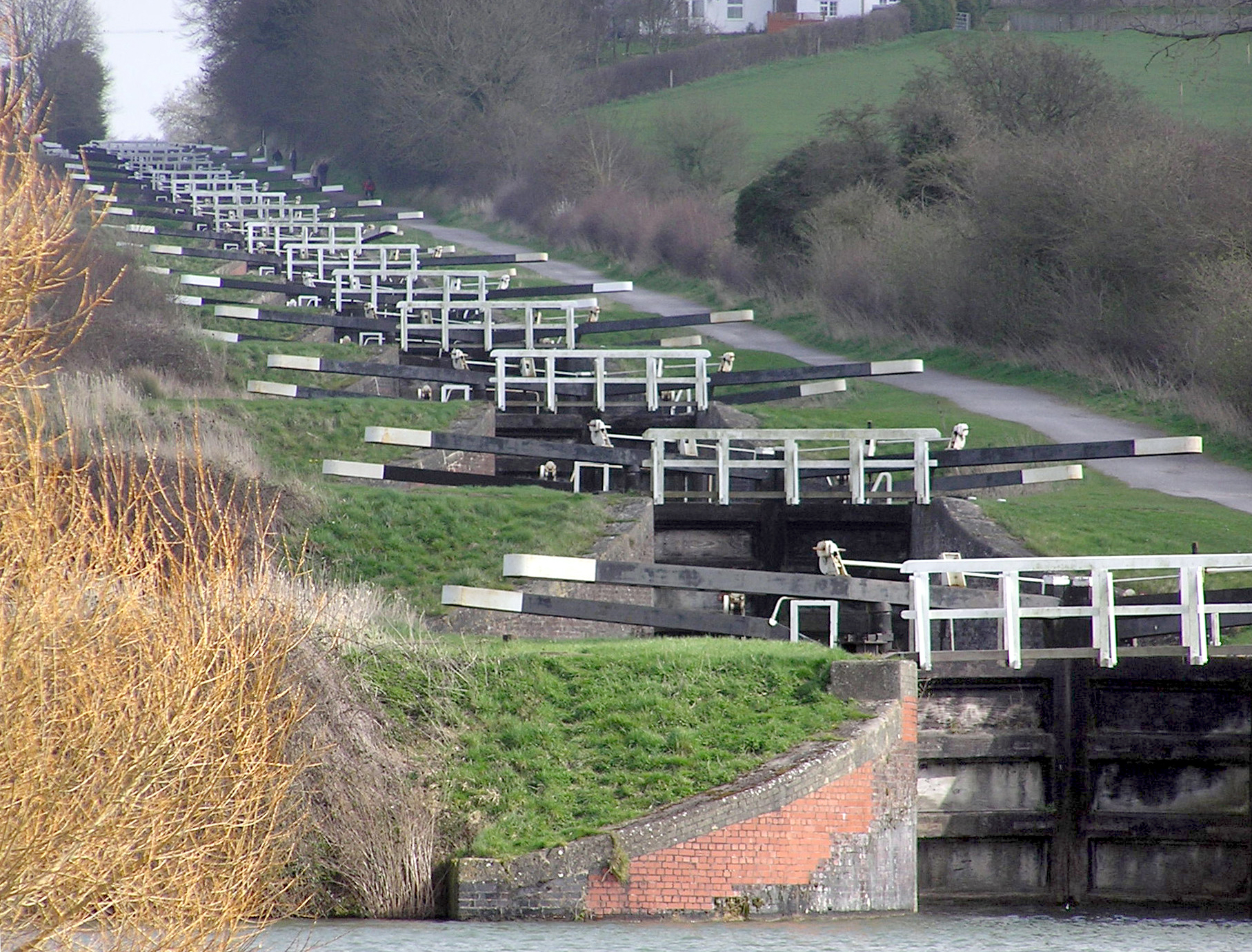
Caen Hill flight

== See also ==
- Canals of the United Kingdom
- Camden Lock, Commercial Road Lock, Limehouse Basin Lock
- Locks on the Kennet and Avon Canal
- Boat lift, Caisson, Caisson lock, Canal inclined plane, Canal pound, Flash lock, Lock staircase, Pound lock
- List of canal aqueducts in the United Kingdom
- List of canal basins in Great Britain
- List of canal junctions in Great Britain
- List of canal tunnels in the United Kingdom
