= Limehouse =

District in Tower Hamlets, London

Coordinates: 51.5158°N 0.0318°W

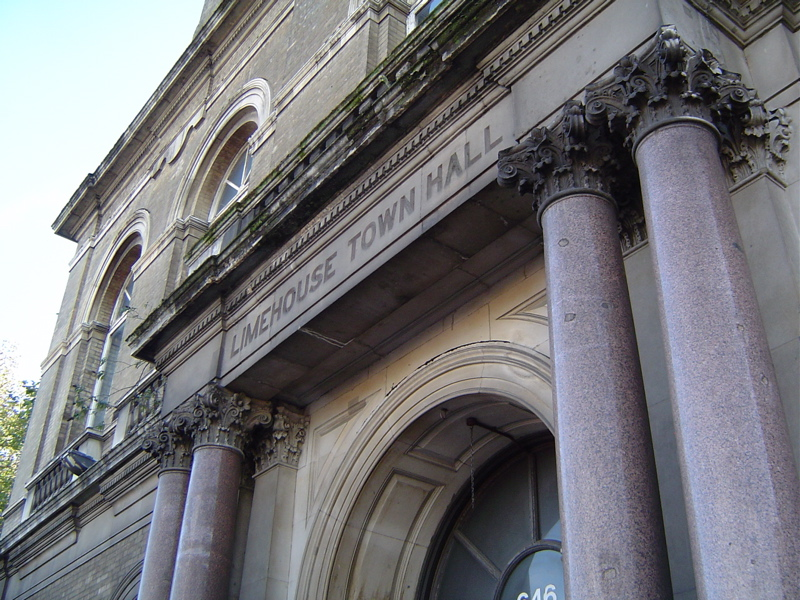
- Limehouse Town Hall on Commercial Road, built in 1878 for the Limehouse District

- Location within Greater London
- Population: 15,986 (2011 Census, Ward)
- OS grid reference: TQ365815
- London borough: Tower Hamlets
- Ceremonial county: Greater London
- Region: London
- Country: England
- Sovereign state: United Kingdom
- Post town: LONDON
- Postcode district: E14
- Dialling code: 020
- Police: Metropolitan
- Fire: London
- Ambulance: London
- UK Parliament: Poplar and Limehouse
- London Assembly: City and East

Limehouse is a district in the London Borough of Tower Hamlets in East London. It is 3.9 miles (6.3 km) east of Charing Cross, on the northern bank of the River Thames. Its proximity to the river has given it a strong maritime character, which it retains through its riverside public houses and steps, such as The Grapes and Limehouse Stairs.

The area gives its name to Limehouse Reach, a section of the Thames which runs south to Millwall after making a right-angled bend at Cuckold's Point, Rotherhithe. The west-to-east section upstream of Cuckold's Point is properly called the Lower Pool.

== History ==
=== Etymology ===
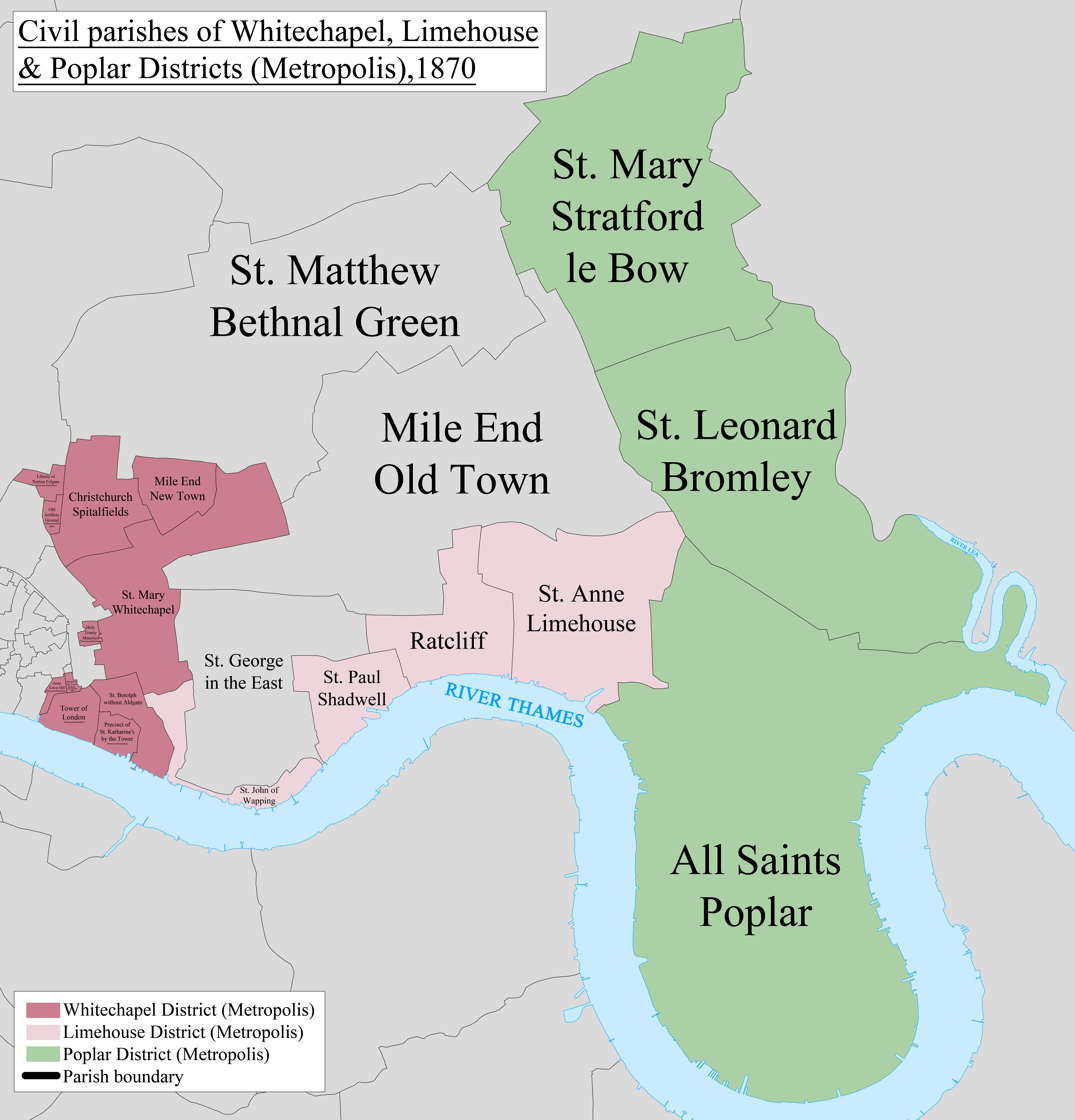
A map showing the civil parish boundaries in 1870.

A map showing the Limehouse wards of Stepney Metropolitan Borough as they appeared in 1916.

The name relates to the local lime kilns or, more precisely, lime oasts, by the river. The name is from Old English līm-āst "lime-oast", and appears in a 1335 record.

The name is found used in 1417:

Inquisicio capta sup' litus Thomisie apud Lymhosteys pro morte Thome Frank.

("Inquest held on the shore of the Thames by Lymhosteys for the death of Thomas Frank")

17 Aug, 5 Henry V. [A.D. 1417], inquest held before "les Lymehostes" within the liberty and franchise of the City, before Henry Bartone, the Mayor, and the King's Escheator, as to the cause of the death of Thomas Franke, of Herewich, late steersman (conductor) or "lodysman" of a ship called "la Mary Knyght" of Danzsk in Prussia. A jury sworn, viz., John Baille, Matthew Holme, Robert Marle, Henry Mark, Alexander Bryan, John Goby, Richard Hervy, Walter Steel, Peter West, Richard Stowell, John Dyse, and Walter Broun. They find that the said Thomas Franke was killed by falling on the sharp end of an anchor

=== Administrative history ===
The area was part of the historic (or ancient) county of Middlesex, but military and most (or all) civil county functions were managed more locally, by the Tower Division (also known as the Tower Hamlets), under the leadership of the Lord-Lieutenant of the Tower Hamlets (the post was always filled by the Constable of the Tower of London).

The role of the Tower Division ended when Limehouse became part of the new County of London in 1889. In 1900, metropolitan boroughs were created for the County of London, and Limehouse became a part of the Metropolitan Borough of Stepney. On 1 April 1927 the civil parish was abolished and merged with Stepney. At the 1921 census (the last before the abolition of the parish), Limehouse had a population of 52,240. In 1965, the County of London was replaced by Greater London, and Stepney borough merged with neighbouring boroughs to form Tower Hamlets.

=== Maritime links ===
From its foundation, Limehouse, like neighbouring Wapping, has enjoyed better links with the river than the land, the land route being across a marsh. Limehouse became a significant port in late medieval times. Although most cargoes were discharged in the Pool of London before the establishment of the docks, industries such as shipbuilding, ship chandlering and rope making were established in Limehouse.

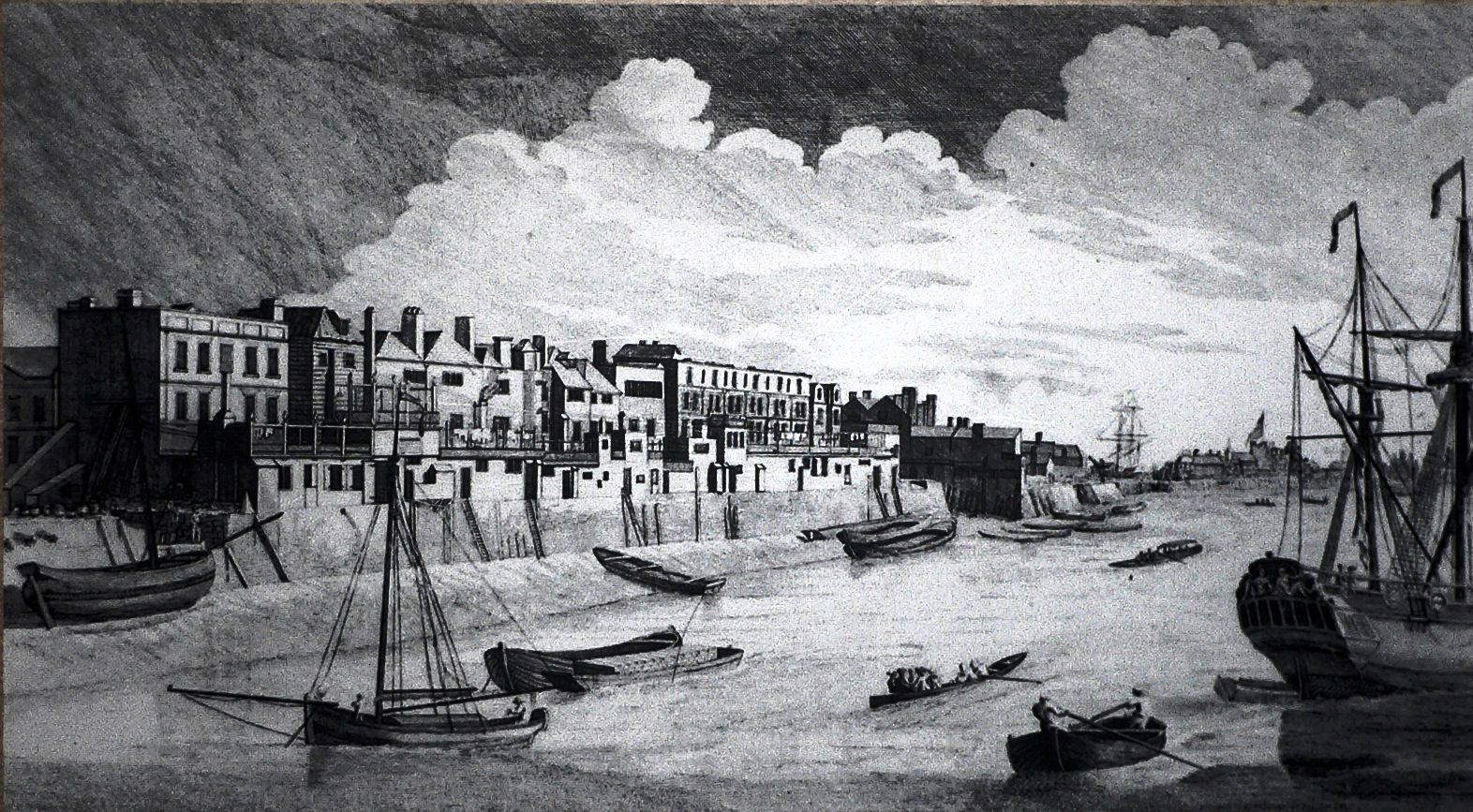
John Boydell's view of the riverside at Limehouse in 1751 shows respectable houses and shipyards crowding onto the riverfront

Limehouse Basin opened in 1820 as the Regent's Canal Dock. This was an important connection between the Thames and the canal system, where cargoes could be transferred from larger ships to the shallow-draught canal boats. This mix of vessels can still be seen in the Basin: canal narrowboats rubbing shoulders with seagoing yachts.

From the Tudor era until the 20th century, ships crews were employed on a casual basis. New and replacement crews would be found wherever they were available – foreign sailors in their own waters being particularly prized for their knowledge of currents and hazards in ports around the world. Crews would be paid off at the end of their voyages and, inevitably, permanent communities of foreign sailors became established, including colonies of Lascars and Africans from the Guinea Coast. Chinese communities developed at Shadwell, Limehouse, and the adjoining Pennyfields area of Poplar. These were established by the crews of merchantmen in the opium and tea trades, particularly Han Chinese. The area achieved notoriety for opium dens in the late 19th century, often featured in pulp fiction works by Sax Rohmer and others. Like much of the East End it remained a focus for immigration. The small Chinese community had all but disappeared by the post World War II era due to by slum clearance, World War II devastation, and economic factors. In the 1950s London's Chinatown was to re-emerge in Soho.

On 12 February 1832, the first case of cholera was reported in London at Limehouse. First described in India in 1817, it had spread here via Hamburg. Although 800 people died during this epidemic, it was fewer than had died of tuberculosis in the same year. Unfortunately, cholera visited again in 1848 and 1858.

The use of Limehouse Basin as a major distribution hub declined with the growth of the railways, although the revival of canal traffic during World War I and World War II gave it a brief swansong. Today, Stepney Historical Trust works to advance the public's education in the history of the area.

=== Post-industrial regeneration ===
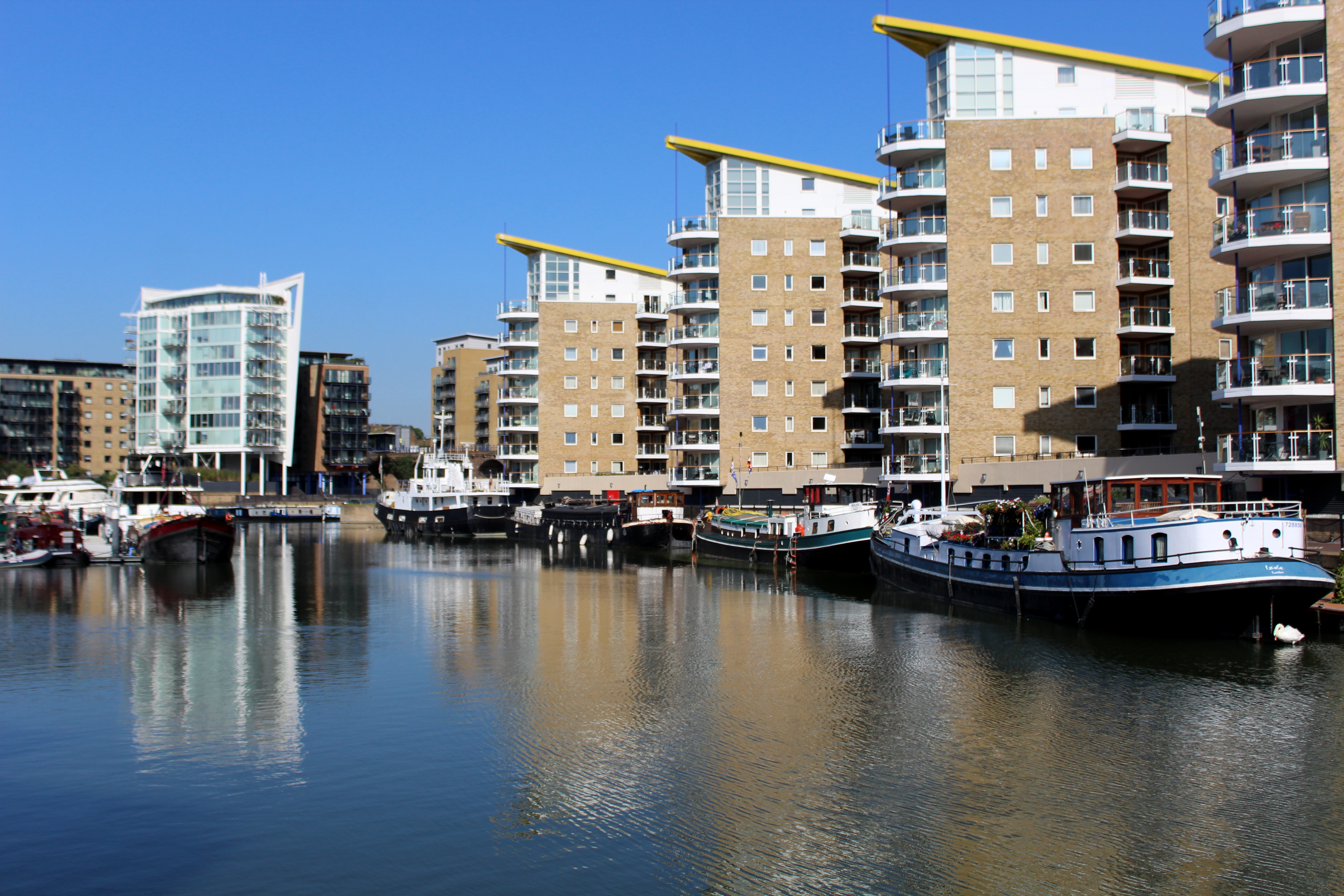
Limehouse Basin, looking north.

Limehouse Basin was amongst the first docks to close in the late 1960s. By 1981, Limehouse shared the East London-wide physical, social and economic decline which led to the setting up of the London Docklands Development Corporation. In November 1982, the LDDC published its Limehouse Area Development Strategy. This built on existing plans for Limehouse Basin, and offered a discussion framework for future development, housing refurbishment and environmental improvements across the whole of Limehouse. It was based on four major projects: Limehouse Basin, Free Trade Wharf, what was then known as the Light Rapid Transit Route (DLR) and the Docklands Northern Relief Road, a road corridor between The Highway and East India Dock across the north of the Isle of Dogs.

In the mid-1980s, developments on the nearby Isle of Dogs (particularly at Canary Wharf) and Poplar, proved to be the catalyst to delivering infrastructure improvements which benefitted Limehouse and some other areas of the London Docklands.

The sheer scale of the Canary Wharf proposals, and, in due course, the rapid implementation of the first phase of development, provided the impetus to the transport improvements which completely altered prospects for Limehouse as well as for the Isle of Dogs. The derelict Regent's Canal Dock was converted into Limehouse Marina.

== Politics ==
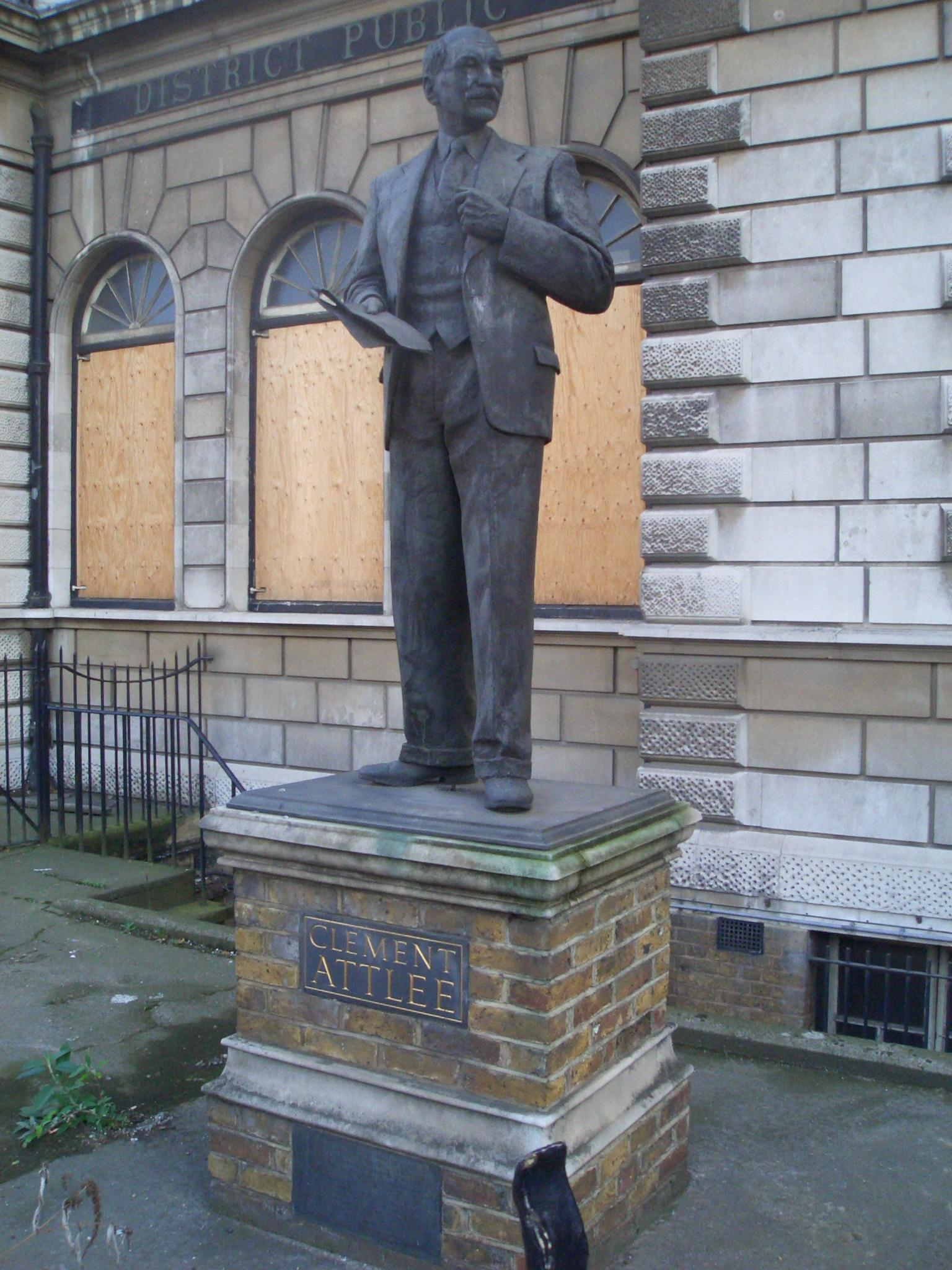
A statue of Clement Attlee, mayor of Stepney (1919) and MP for Limehouse stands outside the former Limehouse Library.

On 30 July 1909, the Chancellor of the Exchequer David Lloyd George made a polemical speech in Limehouse attacking the House of Lords for its opposition to his "People's Budget" and speaking of the Budget's social aims. This was the origin of the verb 'to Limehouse', "To make fiery (political) speeches such as Mr. Lloyd George made at Limehouse in 1909".

From 1906 to 1909, Clement Attlee worked as manager of Haileybury House, a club for working class boys in Limehouse run by his old school. Before this, Attlee's political views had been conservative, but he was shocked by the poverty and deprivation he saw while working with slum children, and this caused him to become a socialist. He joined the Independent Labour Party in 1908, and became mayor of Stepney in 1919. At the 1922 general election, Attlee became Member of Parliament (MP) for the constituency of Limehouse, which he represented while Deputy Prime Minister. After WWII, in 1950, he moved constituencies to Walthamstow West.

On 25 January 1981, MPs Shirley Williams, Roy Jenkins, William Rodgers and David Owen made the Limehouse Declaration from the bridge over Limehouse Cut in Narrow Street: it announced the formation of the Council for Social Democracy in opposition to the granting of block votes to the trade unions in the Labour Party to which they had previously belonged. They soon became leading politicians in the Social Democratic Party.

Today, Limehouse is part of the constituency of Poplar and Limehouse and has been represented in the House of Commons since 2019 by Apsana Begum MP (Labour), and in the London Assembly since 2016 by Unmesh Desai AM (Labour).

== In popular culture ==
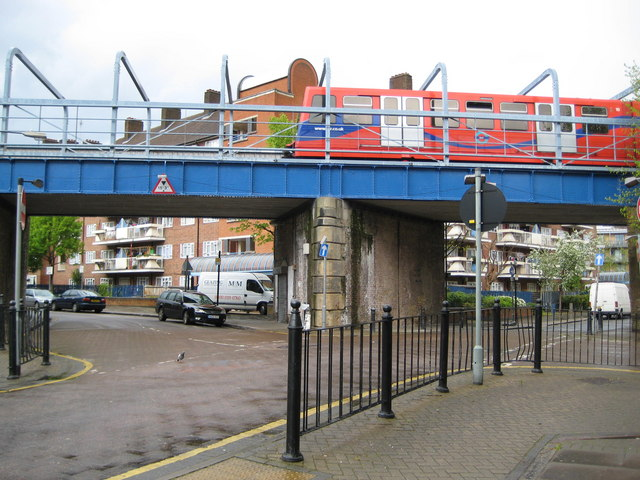
Gill Street and Grenade Street.

Referencing the area being known at the time as London's Chinatown, Douglas Furber (lyricist) and Philip Braham (composer) in 1921 wrote the popular jazz standard "Limehouse Blues", which was introduced by Jack Buchanan and Gertrude Lawrence in the musical revue A to Z. Much later, it was reprised in the ballet "Limehouse Blues" featuring Fred Astaire and Lucille Bremer in the musical film Ziegfeld Follies (1946) and by Julie Andrews in Star! (1968). In both instances the actors were in yellowface. Other notable performances on film include those by Hoagy Carmichael in To Have and Have Not (1944) and by Borrah Minevich and His Harmonica Rascals in One in a Million (1936). Limehouse Blues was also the name of a 1934 film, starring George Raft.

Thomas Burke wrote Limehouse Nights (1916), a collection of stories centred around life in the poverty-stricken Limehouse district of London. Many of Burke's books feature the Chinese character Quong Lee as narrator. The area also features in the Fu Manchu books of Sax Rohmer, where a Limehouse opium den serves as the hideout of the Chinese supervillain. The notion of East End opium dens seems to have originated with a description by Charles Dickens of a visit he made to an opium den in nearby Bluegate Fields, which inspired certain scenes in his last, unfinished, novel The Mystery of Edwin Drood (1870). More recently, the popular graphic novels of Alan Moore, From Hell (1989) and The League of Extraordinary Gentlemen (1999) contain a number of references to the notorious criminality of the area in Victorian London. Victorian-era Limehouse was also the setting of the novel Dan Leno and the Limehouse Golem (1995) by Peter Ackroyd, a fictionalized account of the notorious 'Limehouse Golem' serial murders.

The area also appeared in Anna May Wong's 1929 film Piccadilly, where, as the toughly alluring Shosho, Wong was said to embody the Limehouse Chinatown mystique. The Limehouse district of London is depicted in the silent film Broken Blossoms or The Yellow Man and the Girl (1919), directed by D. W. Griffith, "where the Orient squats at the portals of the West". Limehouse is also the setting of the 1926 film The Blackbird, directed by Tod Browning and starring Lon Chaney. The Limehouse district features prominently in the 1942 film Sherlock Holmes and the Voice of Terror, when Holmes enlists the aid of rather unsavory residents to help catch a Nazi agent.

== Society ==
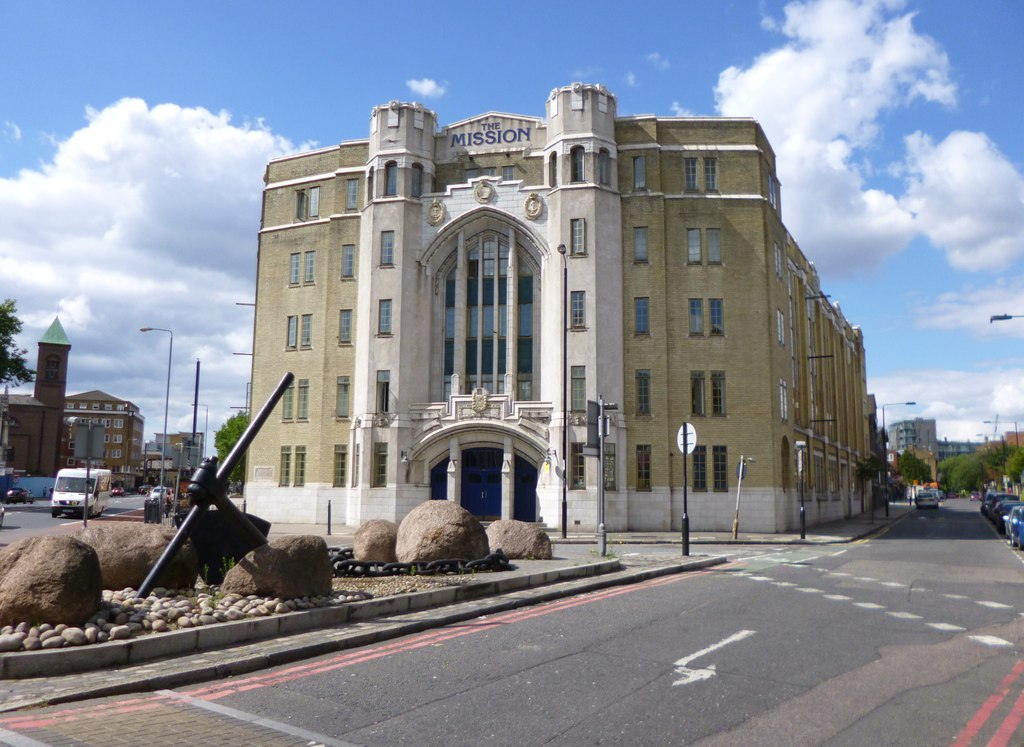
The Mission on Salmon Lane.

St Anne's Limehouse was built by Nicholas Hawksmoor. The church is next door to Limehouse Town Hall and close to Limehouse Library, both Grade II listed buildings, the former now used as a community centre and the latter as a hotel. Across the road is the Sailors' Mission, where Situationist International held its conference in 1960. The building subsequently became a run-down hostel for the homeless which became notorious for its squalor, although it has since been converted into a luxury apartment block.

Further to the southwest, Narrow Street, Limehouse's historic spine, which runs along the back of the Thames wharves, boasts one of the few surviving early Georgian terraces in London. Next to the terrace is the historic Grapes pub, rebuilt in 1720 and well known to Charles Dickens, featuring as the Six Jolly Fellowship Porters in Our Mutual Friend. A few doors along was Booty's Riverside Bar but this closed down in 2012. Almost every building on the other side of Narrow Street was destroyed by bombing in the Second World War, including hundreds of houses, Taylor Walker & Co's Barley Mow Brewery and a school. One notable exception is a former public house, known locally as 'The House They Left Behind', because it was the only Victorian terrace to survive. It still stands today, with the aid of three large supporting pillars.

Further along the street is 'Bread Street Kitchen on the River', a gastropub, now run by Gordon Ramsay. It is housed in the Grade II listed, former dockmaster's and customs house, for Limehouse Dock.

== Education ==
The Stepney Greencoat School is a Church of England primary school that was founded in 1710 by leading community members to local children, it has served the area as it transformed from an industrial to the mixed, multicultural settlement that Limehouse has become today.

== Transport ==
Limehouse station, opened in 1987, is served by National Rail c2c and Docklands Light Railway. On 22 April 1991, two trains collided between Limehouse and Poplar during morning rush hour, requiring a shutdown of the system and evacuation of passengers by ladder.

A number of London Buses routes serve Limehouse, including routes 15, 115, 135, D3 and night bus routes N15, N550 and N551.

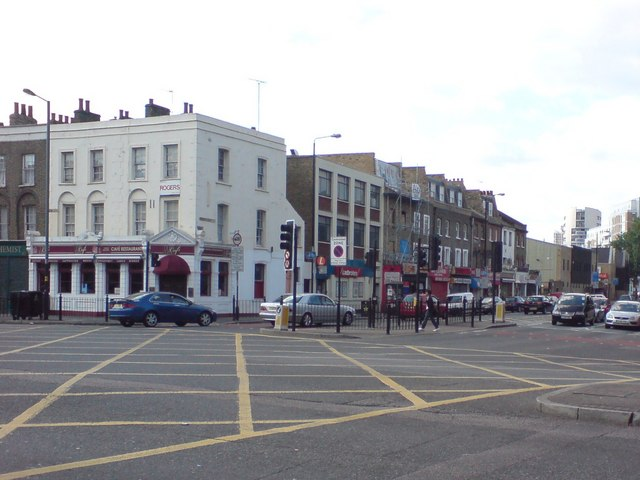
Corner of Burdett Road and Commercial Road.

Limehouse is connected to the National Road Network by the A13 Commercial Road which passes west–east through Limehouse, while the A1203 Limehouse Link tunnel passes under Limehouse Basin, linking The Highway with the Docklands Northern Relief Road. The northern entrance of the Rotherhithe Tunnel emerges in Limehouse, to the west of the Basin and close to Limehouse railway station.

Narrow Street forms a part of the north bank of the Thames Path and had previously been the principal street in Limehouse. It includes the Cycleway 3 between Tower Gateway to Barking, one of London's first Cycle Superhighways.

Though no longer a working dock, Limehouse Basin with its marina remains a working facility. The same is not true of the wharf buildings that have survived, most of which are now highly desirable residential properties. Limehouse Basin connects to the Regent's Canal via the Commercial Road Lock to the north, and the River Thames via Limehouse Basin Lock to the south. The Limehouse Cut connects the Basin to the River Lea in the east.

== Notable residents ==
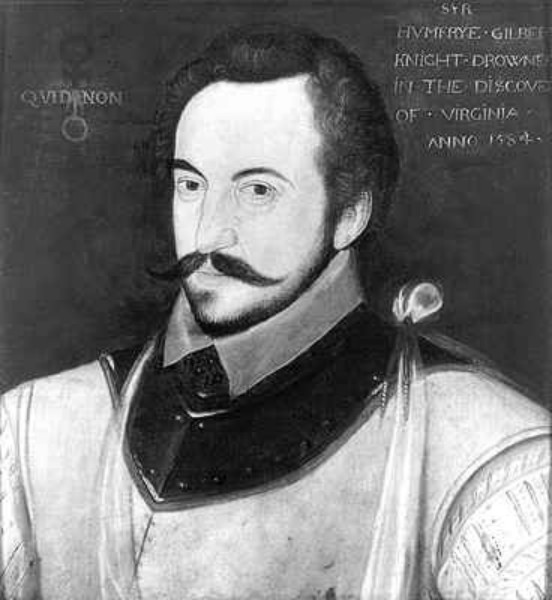
Sir Humphrey Gilbert, c. 1583

Sir Humphrey Gilbert lived here, and was an advocate of opening up the Northwest Passage. This inspired Martin Frobisher to sail to Baffin Island, and he returned with a mysterious black rock. Gilbert set up the Society of the New Art with Lord Burghley and the Earl of Leicester, who had their alchemical laboratory in Limehouse; however, their attempts to transmute the black rock into gold proved fruitless. (Humphrey's brother Adrian Gilbert was reputed a great alchemist and worked closely with John Dee.)

Captain Christopher Newport lived in Limehouse for several years up until 1595. He rose through the sailing ranks from a poor cabin boy to a wealthy English privateer and eventually one of the Masters of the Royal Navy. He became rich pirating Spanish treasure vessels in the West Indies. In 1607 he sailed the Susan Constant, followed by the Godspeed and Discovery, as Admiral of the Fleet to Jamestown. He helped secure England's foothold in North America through five voyages to Jamestown. He sailed his entire life, dying on a trading voyage to Bantam, on the island of Java in present-day Indonesia. His sailing experience in Limehouse made him known as Captain Christopher Newport, of Limehouse, Mariner.

Charles Dickens' godfather, Christopher Huffam, ran his sailmaking business from 12 Church Row (Newell Street). Huffam is said to be the inspiration for the Paul Dombey character in Dickens' Dombey and Son.

James McNeill Whistler and Charles Napier Hemy sketched and painted at locations on Narrow Street's river waterfront.

Contemporary residents include the actor Ian McKellen, Matthew Parris, comedy actress Cleo Rocos, actor Steven Berkoff, comedian Lee Hurst , as well as politician David Owen. Limehouse was also the home of the late film director David Lean, and Charlie Magri, world champion flyweight boxer, who grew up on the Burdett Estate.
