= Salmon Lane Lock =

Lock in London Borough of Tower Hamlets, London, England

Salmon Lane Lock No. 11
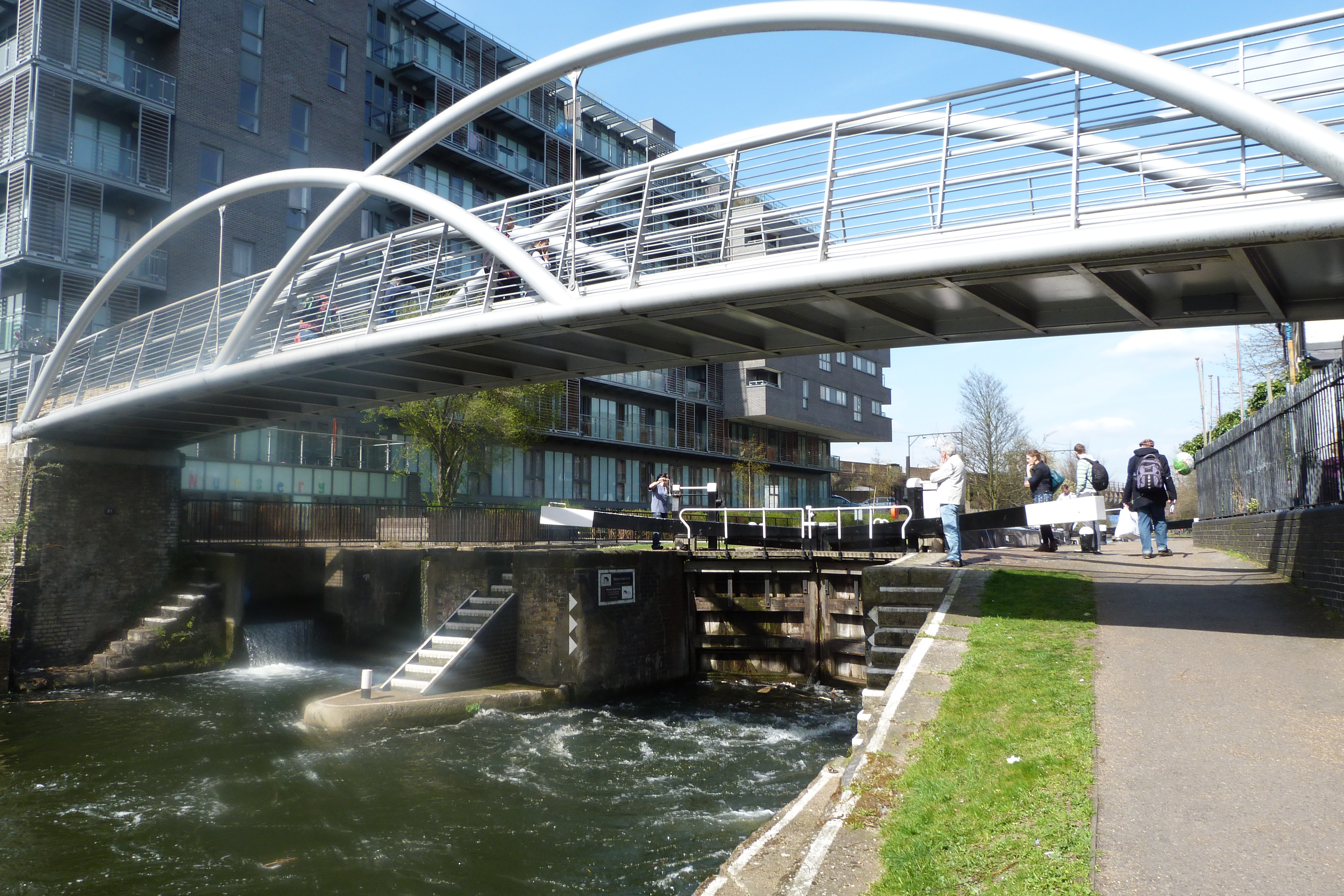
- Salmon Lane Lock
- 51°30′54″N 0°02′05″W
- Waterway: Regent's Canal
- County: Tower Hamlets; Greater London
- Maintained by: Canal and River Trust
- Fall: 8 feet (2.4 m)
- Distance to Limehouse Basin: 0.4 miles (0.6 km)
- Distance to Paddington Basin: 8.5 miles (13.7 km)

Salmon Lane Lock is a lock on the Regent's Canal, in Limehouse in the London Borough of Tower Hamlets. A new footbridge at the lock was completed in February 2005 connecting Parnham Street to Salmon Lane.

== See also ==
- Canals of the United Kingdom
- History of the British canal system
- Geograph

Next lock upstream	Regent's Canal	Next lock downstream
Johnson's Lock; No. 10	Salmon Lane Lock; Grid reference: TQ364813	Commercial Road Lock; No. 12
