= Stepney Power Station =

Former coal-fired power station

- Country: England
- Location: Tower Hamlets, London
- Coordinates: 51.509574°N 0.034500°W
- Status: Decommissioned and demolished
- Commission date: 1907; 119 years ago
- Decommission date: 1972; 54 years ago
- Operators: Stepney Borough Council (1907–1948); British Electricity Authority (1948–1955); Central Electricity Authority (1955–1957); Central Electricity Generating Board (1958–1972)

Thermal power station
- Primary fuel: Coal
- Chimneys: 1 (351 feet)
- Cooling source: River water

Power generation
- Units operational: 1 × 34 MW (1964-72)
- Annual net output: (See text)

Stepney Power Station (sometimes known as Limehouse Power Station) was a small coal-fired power station situated by the Thames on the north side of Narrow Street, Limehouse, London.

== History ==
Stepney Borough Council began construction of the station at Blyth Wharf in 1907.It initially contained a single Willans & Robinson 2,000 kW 6,000-volt 50-cycle three-phase turbo-alternator This plant was supplemented by a further two Willans turbo alternators a Parsons DC set with total capacity of this plant being some 6,500 Kw. In 1915 the station was extended to allow two 5,000-Kw. Escher Wyss turbines connected to Brown Boveri alternators. A coaling jetty was built in 1923. The station supplied the boroughs of Stepney and Bethnal Green.

New generating equipment was added as the demand for electricity increased. The generating capacity, maximum load, and electricity generated and sold was as follows:

Stepney power station generating capacity, load and electricity produced and sold, 1903–46
Year	Generating capacity, MW	Maximum load, MW	Electricity generated, GWh	Electricity sold, GWh
1903/04	1.72	1.266	2.745	2.53
1912/13	8.00	6.046	17.783	14.580
1918/19	16.50	9.720	28.812	25.383
1919/20	16.00	10.24	30.836	28.503
1923/24	32.00	17.501	50.053	42.140
1936/37	70.00	41.904	95.304	98.686
1946		61.48	140.157	128.92

In 1923 the plant comprised one 1,500 kW, one 2,000 kW, two 5,000 kW, and one 10,000 kW turbo alternators, totalling 23,500 kW. The surplus of revenue over expenses in 1923 was £129,659.

Following pollution problems from the original chimneys a single tall brick chimney was constructed in 1937, dominating the area. In 1956 it was reported that the first Brown-Riley coal pulveriser had been installed at Stepney power station and having been in operation for some time was working with satisfactory results. At this time the equipment comprised: 1 × 34 MW Fraser & Chalmers-GEC; 1 × 19 MW Escher-Wyss-Oerlikon; 1 × 6.25 MW Escher-Wyss-Brown-Bovery; and 2 × 12.5 MW Metro-Vickers turbo-alternators.

During its final decade of operation the station comprised a single 34 MW generator. This was supplied with steam at a range of pressures and temperatures: 180/350 psi (12.4/24.1 bar) at 299/399/460 °C. The steam capacity of the boilers was 753,000 lb/hr (94.9 kg/s). The boilers comprised 3 × Stirling; 3 × Spearling; and 2 × Babcock & Wilcox. Electricity output from Stepney power station was as follows.

Stepney annual electricity output GWh

The station continued generation until 1972 and has since been demolished. The coaling jetty in the river remains.
