= Old Ford Lock (Regent's Canal) =

Lock on the Regent's Canal, in the London Borough of Tower Hamlets

Old Ford Lock No. 8
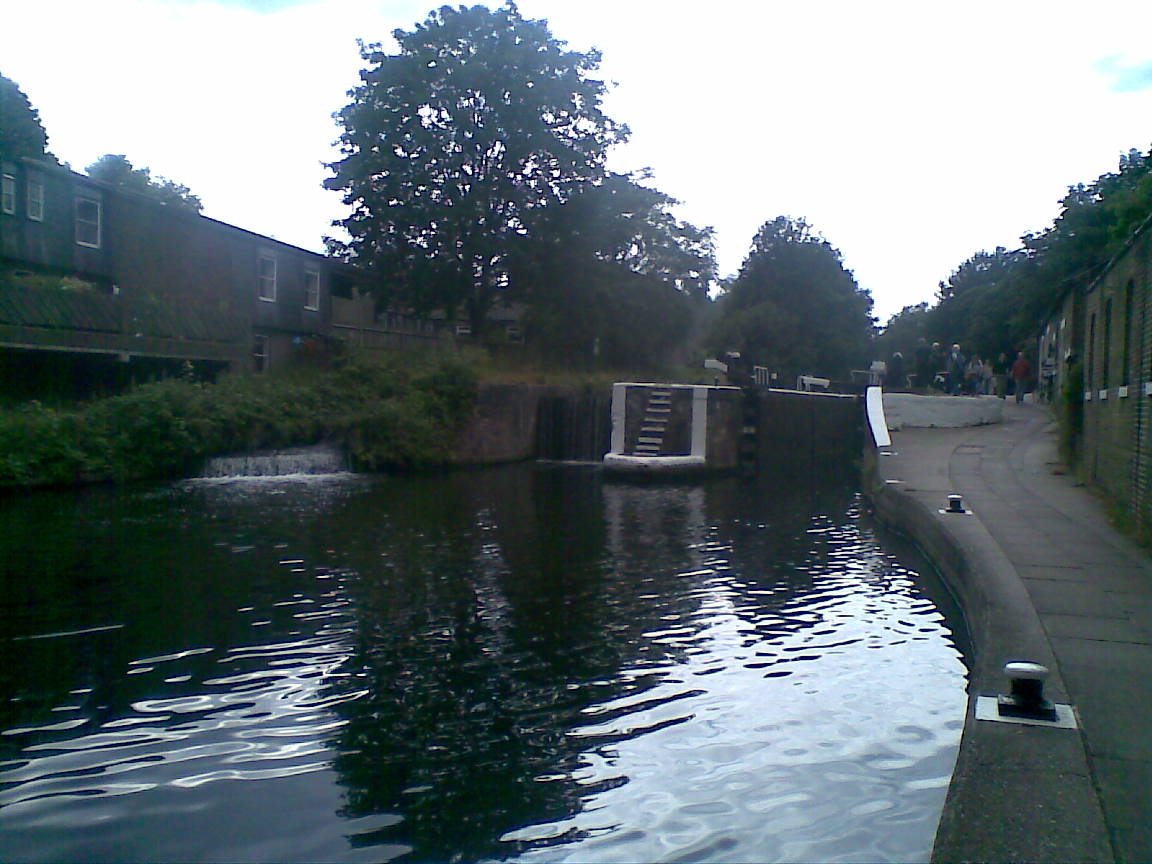
- Old Ford Lock, 2008
- 51°31′57″N 0°02′44″W
- Waterway: Regent's Canal
- County: Tower Hamlets; Greater London
- Maintained by: Canal & River Trust
- Fall: 8 feet (2.4 m)
- Distance to Limehouse Basin: 1.9 miles (3.1 km)
- Distance to Paddington Basin: 7 miles (11.3 km)

Old Ford Lock is a lock on the Regent's Canal in the Bethnal Green located in the London Borough of Tower Hamlets.

The associated lock cottage, and stables were designated Grade II listed buildings in 1990. Thames lighters using the canal would have horses provided by the operators of the canal. Horses would be changed at City Road Lock - where the canal enters the Islington Tunnel - and at Camden Lock.

The lock has facilities for taking on water and for disposal of rubbish and chemical-toilet waste.

Next lock upstream	Regent's Canal	Next lock downstream
Acton's Lock; No. 7	Old Ford Lock (Regent's Canal); Grid reference: TQ362825	Mile End Lock; No. 9
