= Sturt's Lock =

Lock on Regent's Canal, London, England

Sturt's Lock No. 6
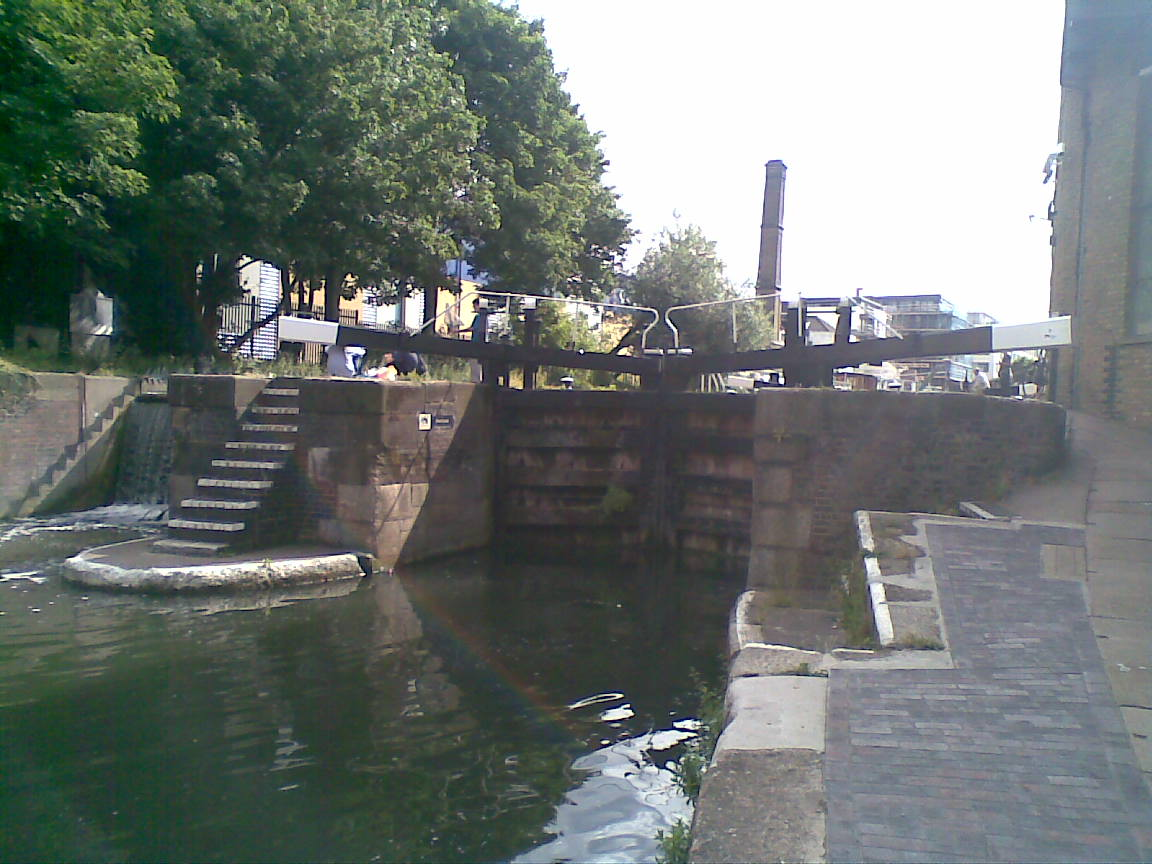
- Sturt's Lock, 2008
- 51.534918°N 0.091737°W
- Waterway: Regent's Canal
- County: Islington; Greater London
- Maintained by: Canal & River Trust
- Fall: 8 feet (2.4 m)
- Distance to Limehouse Basin: 3.5 miles (5.6 km)
- Distance to Paddington Basin: 5.4 miles (8.7 km)

Sturt's Lock is a lock on the Regent's Canal, in the London Borough of Islington, England. The lock has a rise of 8 ft (2.4 m)

There is a residential mooring area.

In 2021 the area of the lock was the subject of a planning application to which the Friends of the Regent's Canal objected.

The nearest London Underground station is Old Street on the Northern line.

== See also ==
- Canals of the United Kingdom
- History of the British canal system

Next lock upstream	Regent's Canal	Next lock downstream
City Road Lock; No. 5	Sturt's Lock; Grid reference: TQ343836	Acton's Lock; No. 7
