= Mile End Lock =

Lock in London Borough of Tower Hamlets, London, England

Mile End Lock No. 9
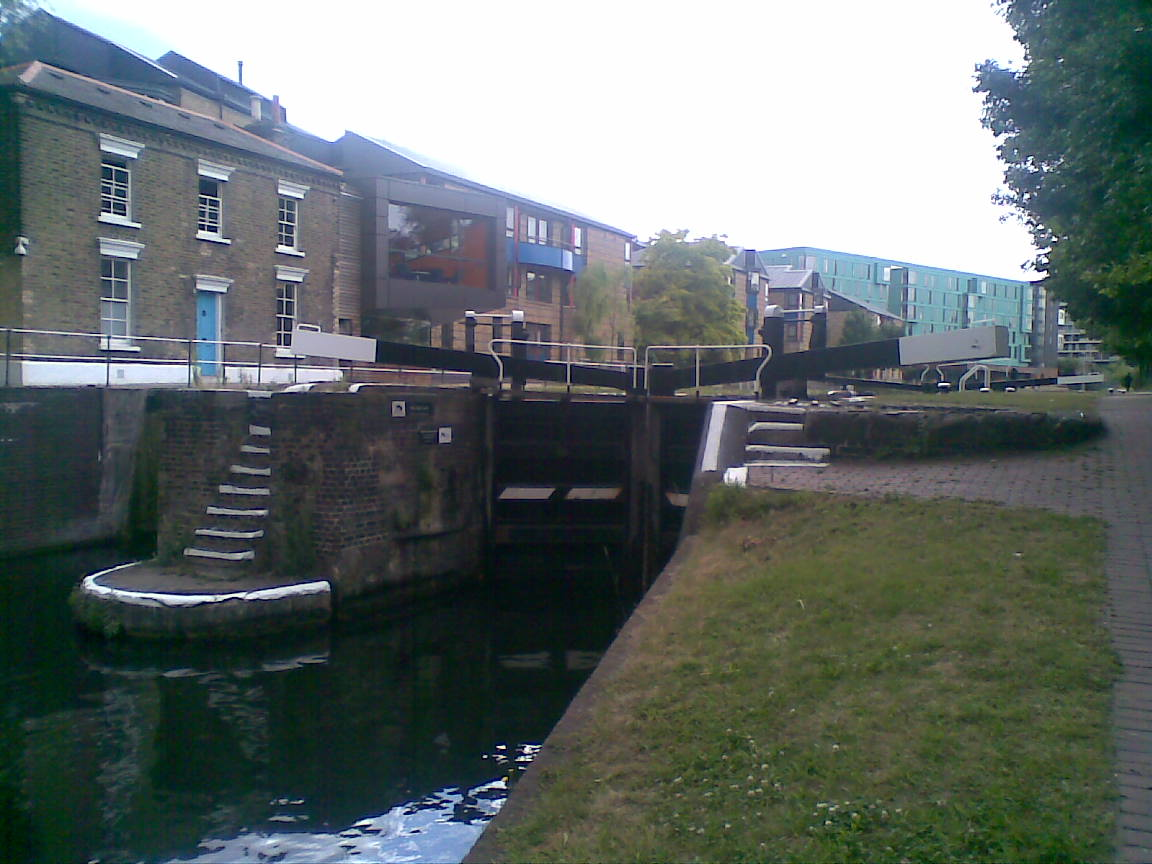
- Mile End Lock, 2008
- 51°31′30″N 0°02′17″W
- Waterway: Regent's Canal
- County: Tower Hamlets; Greater London
- Maintained by: Canal & River Trust
- Fall: 8 feet (2.4 m)
- Distance to Limehouse Basin: 1 mile (1.6 km)
- Distance to Paddington Basin: 7.9 miles (12.7 km)

Mile End Lock is a lock on the Regent's Canal, in Mile End, in the London Borough of Tower Hamlets. The lock spans the Regent's Canal between Queen Mary University of London and Mile End Park, and the canal path goes under Mile End Bridge. There is a 19th-century lock keeper's cottage.

The nearest London Underground station is Mile End.

== See also ==
- Canals of the United Kingdom
- History of the British canal system

Next lock upstream	Regent's Canal	Next lock downstream
Old Ford Lock; No. 8	Mile End Lock; Grid reference: TQ363819	Johnson's Lock; No. 10
