= Johnson's Lock =

Lock in London Borough of Tower Hamlets, London, England

Johnson's Lock No. 10
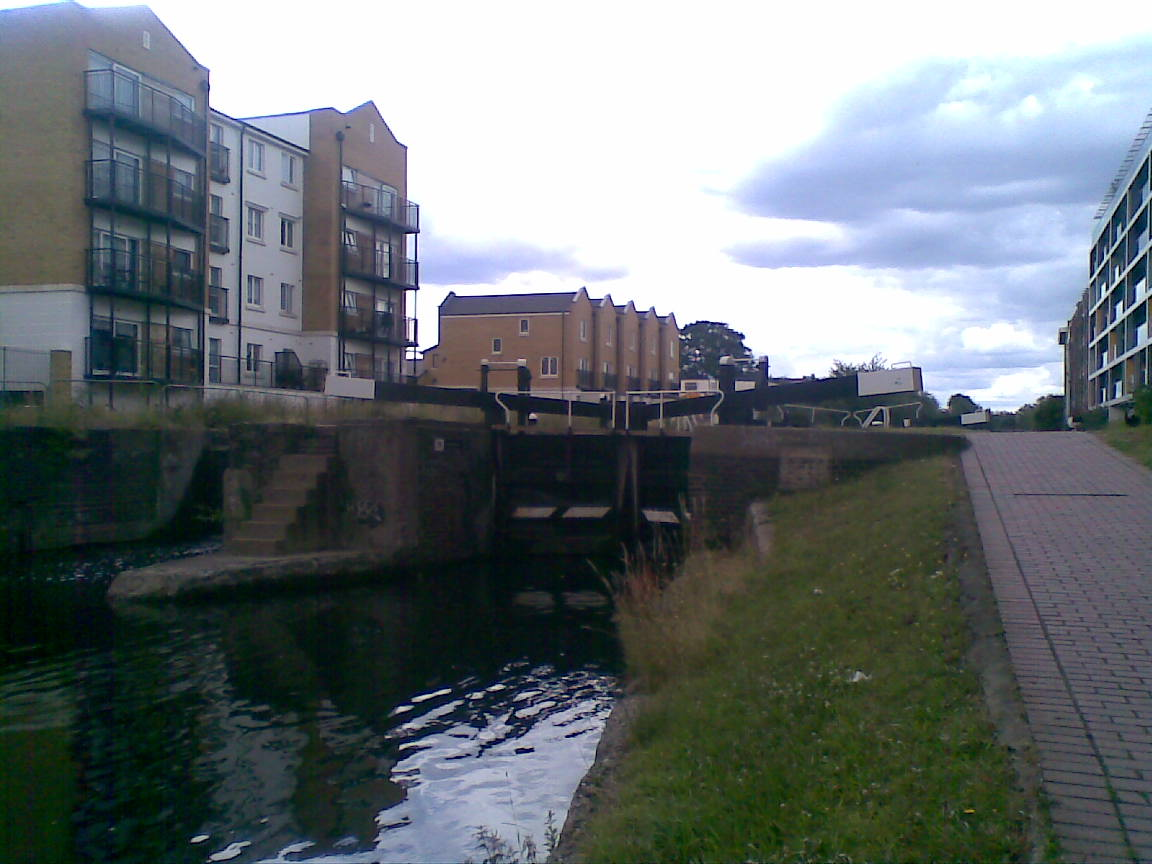
- Johnson's Lock, 2008
- Interactive map of Johnson's Lock No. 10
- 51°31′11″N 0°02′11″W
- Waterway: Regent's Canal
- County: Tower Hamlets; Greater London
- Maintained by: Canal and River Trust
- Fall: 8 feet (2.4 m)
- Distance to Limehouse Basin: 0.63 miles (1.0 km)
- Distance to Paddington Basin: 8.3 miles (13.4 km)

Johnson's Lock is a lock on the Regent's Canal, between Mile End and Stepney in the London Borough of Tower Hamlets.

The nearest London Underground stations are Mile End and Stepney Green.

== See also ==
- Canals of the United Kingdom
- History of the British canal system

Next lock upstream	Regent's Canal	Next lock downstream
Mile End Lock; No. 9	Johnson's Lock; Grid reference: TQ364813	Salmon Lane Lock; No. 11
