= The Grapes, Limehouse =

Public house in London, England

The Grapes
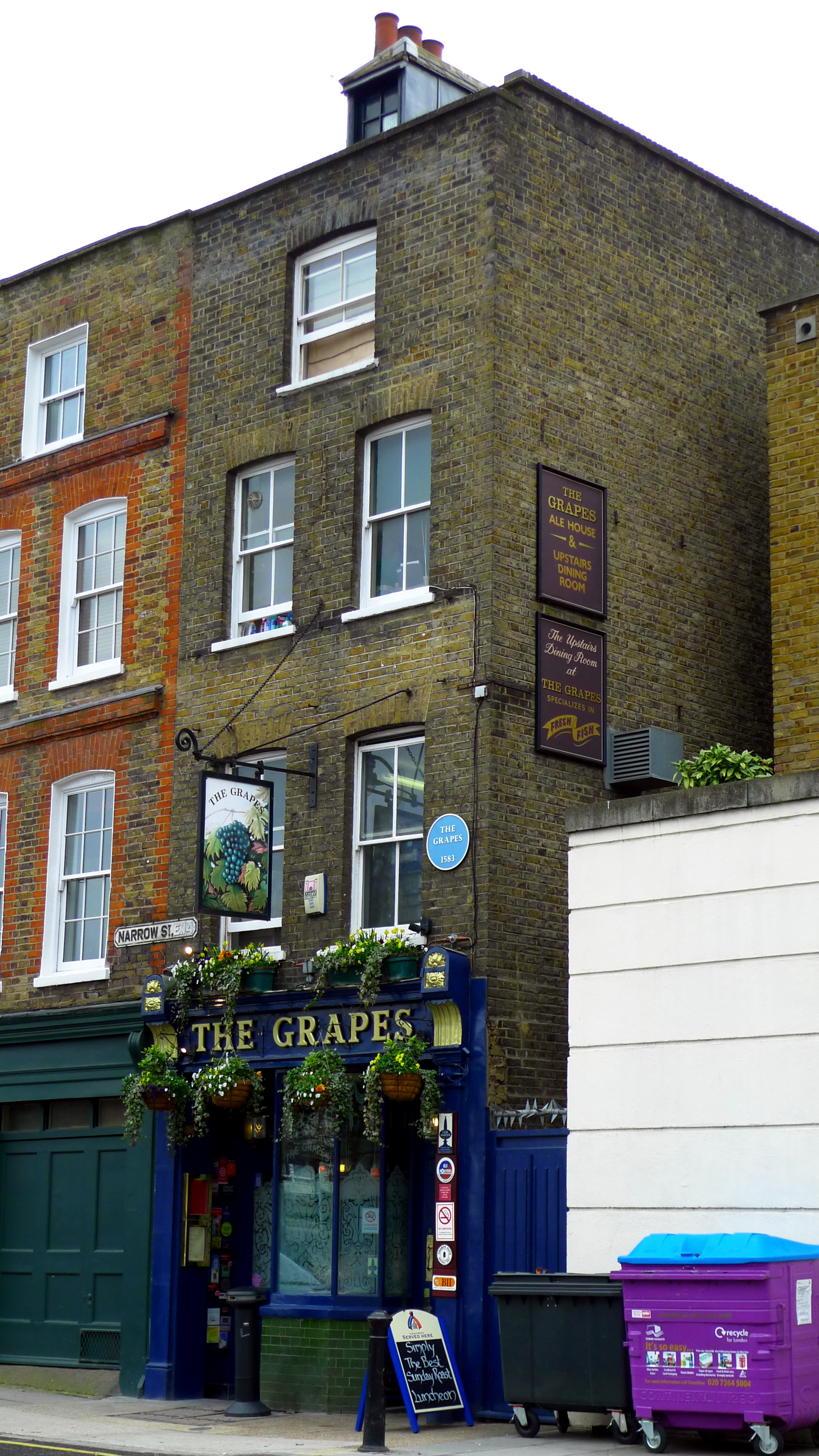
- View of the pub from Narrow Street

- Location within London Borough of Tower Hamlets

General information
- Type: Public house
- Location: 76 Narrow Street, Limehouse, London
- Coordinates: 51°30′31.61″N 0°2′2.67″W

Website
- www.thegrapes.co.uk

The Grapes is a public house situated directly on the north bank of the Thames in London's Limehouse area, with a veranda overlooking the water. To its landward side, the pub is found at number 76 in Narrow Street, flanked by former warehouses now converted to residential and other uses. It is listed Grade II on the National Heritage List for England.

The Grapes is owned in partnership by the actor Sir Ian McKellen, the theatre and film director Sean Mathias, and Evgeny Lebedev, publisher of the Evening Standard newspaper.

== History ==
The current building dates from the 1720s and is on the site of a pub built in 1583. It was formerly a working-class tavern serving the dockers of the Limehouse Basin. In the 1930s it sold beer from the adjacent brewery owned by Taylor Walker. It survived the intense bombing of the area in World War II, and is just outside the Docklands commercial zone built in the 1980s.

In 1995, The Grapes' lease was taken over by Barbara Haigh, a former cocktail waitress at the London Playboy Club, who went on to host regular Playboy Bunny reunions at the venue. She left the pub in 2012, when it was taken over by its current owners.

== Local area ==
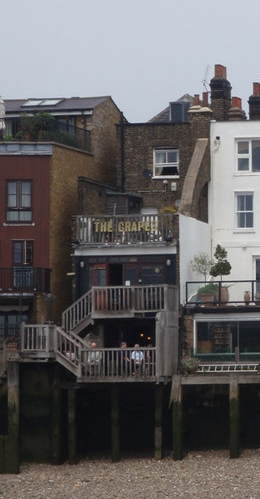
View of the pub from the river at low tide

Limehouse was settled early as a dry bank suitable for growing, easy building upon and import, export, chandlery and fishing—most of many times wider Poplar to the east was the low-lying fields of the Isle of Dogs used for the keeping of marsh sheep with the national markets in the City just west. To the west before the City were the similar small wharf and early built-up 'Tower Division of Middlesex hamlets' of Ratcliff, Shadwell, Wapping and St Katherine by the Tower each with their own urban settlements; together with Limehouse covering no more than a square mile in total. By Queen Elizabeth I's time, Limehouse joined with its neighbours as a doorway to world trade in the City and to ships embarking across the British Empire; a contemporary Limehouse-based world explorer was Sir Humphrey Gilbert. From directly below The Grapes, Sir Walter Raleigh set sail on his third voyage to the New World.

Standing in the Thames behind The Grapes is Sir Anthony Gormley's statue Another Time, which was purchased by Ian McKellen and installed in 2013.

In 1661, Samuel Pepys' diary records his trip to lime kilns at the jetty just along from The Grapes.

=== Artistic references ===
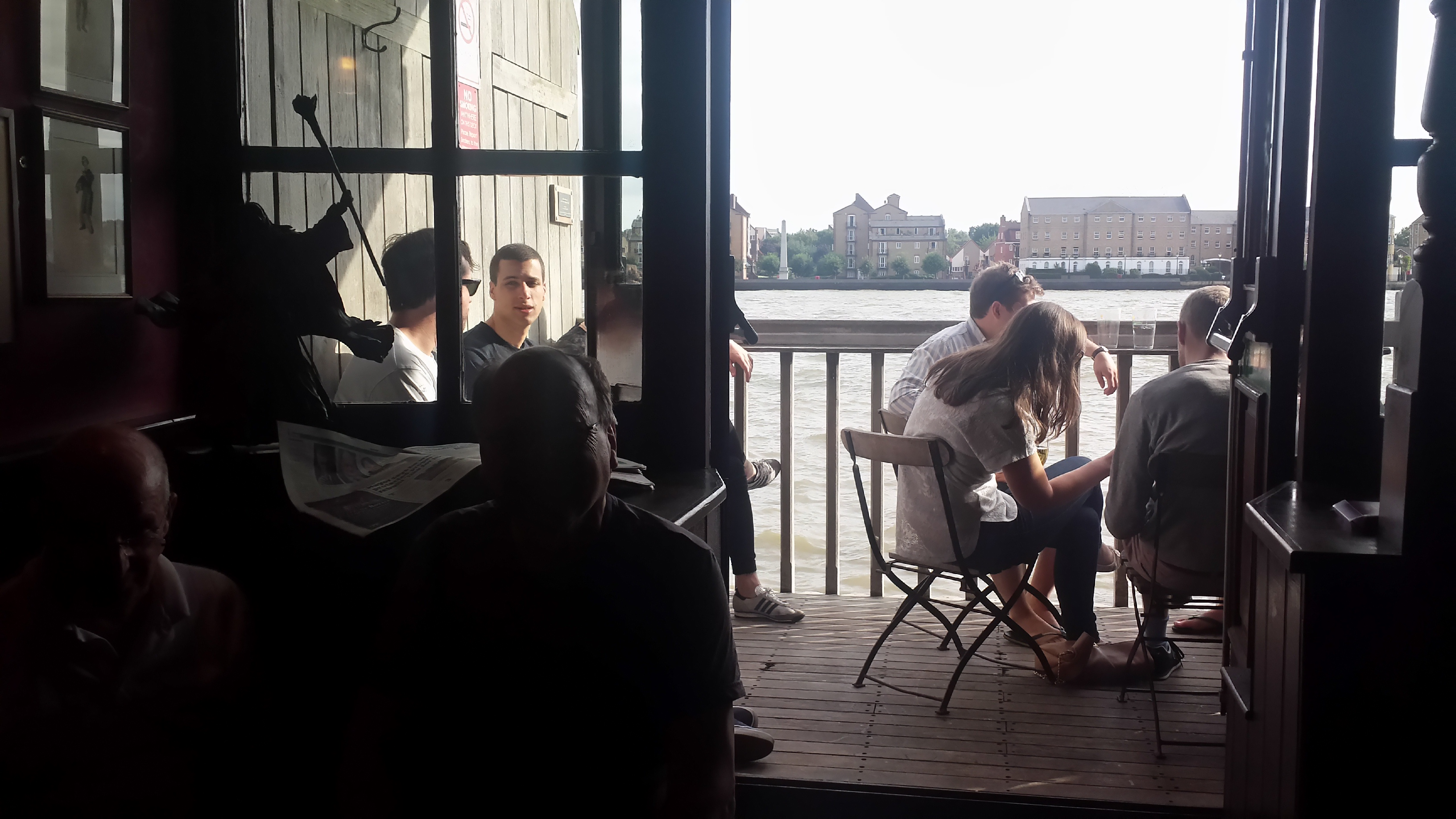
View from the inside looking over the river

In 1820, the young Charles Dickens visited his godfather in Limehouse and knew the district well for 40 years. The Grapes appears, scarcely disguised, in the opening chapter of his novel Our Mutual Friend:

A tavern of dropsical appearance ... long settled down into a state of hale infirmity. It had outlasted many a sprucer public house, indeed the whole house impended over the water but seemed to have got into the condition of a faint-hearted diver, who has paused so long on the brink that he will never go in at all.

Other popular writers were drawn by huddled buildings, wharves and docks by the bustling river: Oscar Wilde in The Picture of Dorian Gray; Arthur Conan Doyle, who sent Sherlock Holmes in search of opium provided by the local Chinese immigrants; and, more recently, Peter Ackroyd in Dan Leno and the Limehouse Golem.

Narrow Street is also associated with distinguished painters. Francis Bacon lived and worked at No. 80, and Edward Wolfe at No. 96. James McNeill Whistler painted a Nocturne of Limehouse. On The Grapes' walls are an oil painting, Limehouse Barge Builders, by the marine artist Napier Hemy; watercolours of Limehouse Reach by Louise Hardy; and Dickens at The Grapes by the New Zealand artist Nick Cuthell.

== See also ==
- Prospect of Whitby
