= Colin Gwyer & Associates Ltd v London Wharf (Limehouse) Ltd =

UK corporate law case

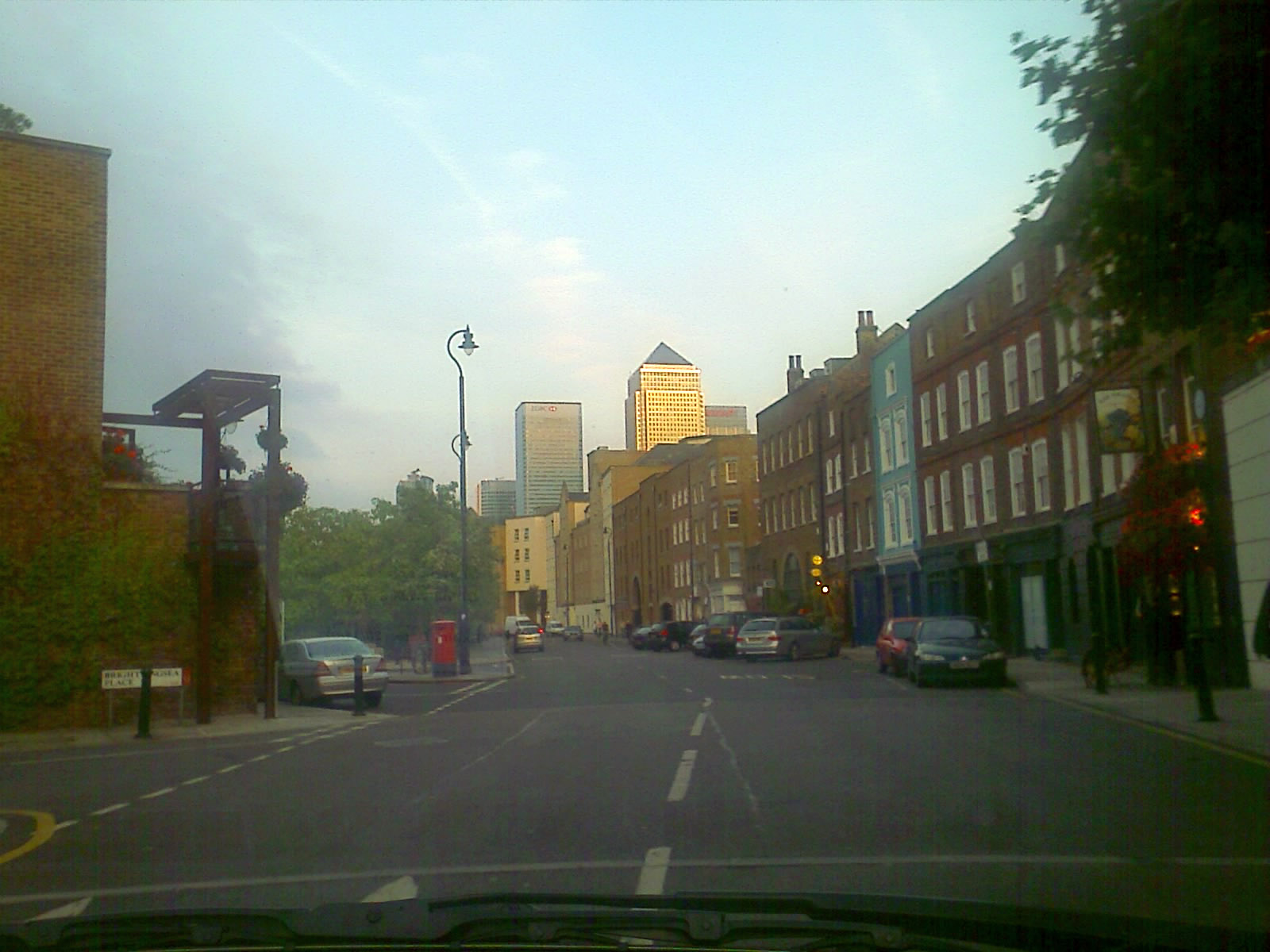
- Court: High Court, Chancery Division
- Decided: 13 December 2002
- Citation: [2003] BCC 885, [2003] 2 BCLC 153

Court membership
- Judge sitting: Leslie Kosmin QC

Keywords
- Directors' duties, creditors, insolvency

Colin Gwyer & Associates Ltd v London Wharf (Limehouse) Ltd [2003] BCC 885 (also, Eaton Bray Ltd v Palmer) is a UK insolvency law and company law case concerning directors' duties. It recognized that directors owe fiduciary duties to creditors when a company is on the verge of insolvency.

== Facts ==
London Wharf (Limehouse) Ltd was a company set up to manage three flats at 28 Narrow Street, just near the Thames in London. Colin Gwyer & Associates Ltd owned flat one on the ground floor. Mr Gwyer owned that company. Mr Palmer owned flat two and Eaton Bray Ltd owned flat three. Each had one share in the company, which held the head lease. They did not get along. Mr Gwyer had been carrying out building work. It disturbed them. He did it without their permission, in breach of covenant. It disturbed Eaton Bray Ltd in particular, which brought proceedings to make Mr Gwyer's company forfeit the lease. Meanwhile, London Wharf (Limehouse) Ltd was teetering on the verge of insolvency. Then Mr Gwyer nominated his builder (Mr Howell) to the board of the company. Eaton Bray Ltd was even more upset, and its nominated director refused to attend a board meeting to resolve the dispute. Mr Palmer wanted it settled. Mr Palmer and Mr Howell resolved that Mr Gwyer's terms for settling the matter would be accepted. Eaton Bray Ltd sued, arguing the resolution was ineffective because it was breach of a fiduciary duty.

== Judgment ==
Leslie Kosmin QC held that the board meeting was validly convened and was quorate. Although London Wharf's articles of association allowed Mr Howell to vote on a resolution in which he had an interest, the provision's existence did not relieve him of a general duty to act in good faith for the interests of London Wharf. When they passed the resolution, the two directors were in breach of fiduciary duty. Moreover, since insolvency was imminent, they also had a duty to act in the interests of company creditors. They did not properly consider creditors, either. Therefore, the resolution accepting the settlement was invalid.

== See also ==
- West Mercia Safetywear Ltd v Dodd (1988) 4 BCC 30; [1988] BCLC 250
- Re Smith & Fawcett [1942] Ch 304
- Charterbridge Corp Ltd v Lloyd’s Bank Ltd [1970] Ch 62, ‘could an honest and intelligent man, in the position of the directors, in all the circumstances, reasonably have believed that the decision was for the benefit of the company’.

US law

- Geyer v. Ingersoll Publication Co., 621 A.2d 784 (Del. Ch. 1992);
- Credit Lyonnais Bank Netherland, N.V. v. Pathe Communication Corp., Civ. A. No. 12150, 1991 WL 277613, at 34 n.55 (Del. Ch. Dec. 30, 1991)
- North American Catholic Education Programming Foundation, Inc. v. Gheewalla, 930 A.2d 92 (Del. 2007) denying direct fiduciary claims against directors by creditors and limiting these duties to situations where the firm is already insolvent
