= Acton's Lock =

Lock in London Borough of Hackney, London, England

Acton's Lock No. 7
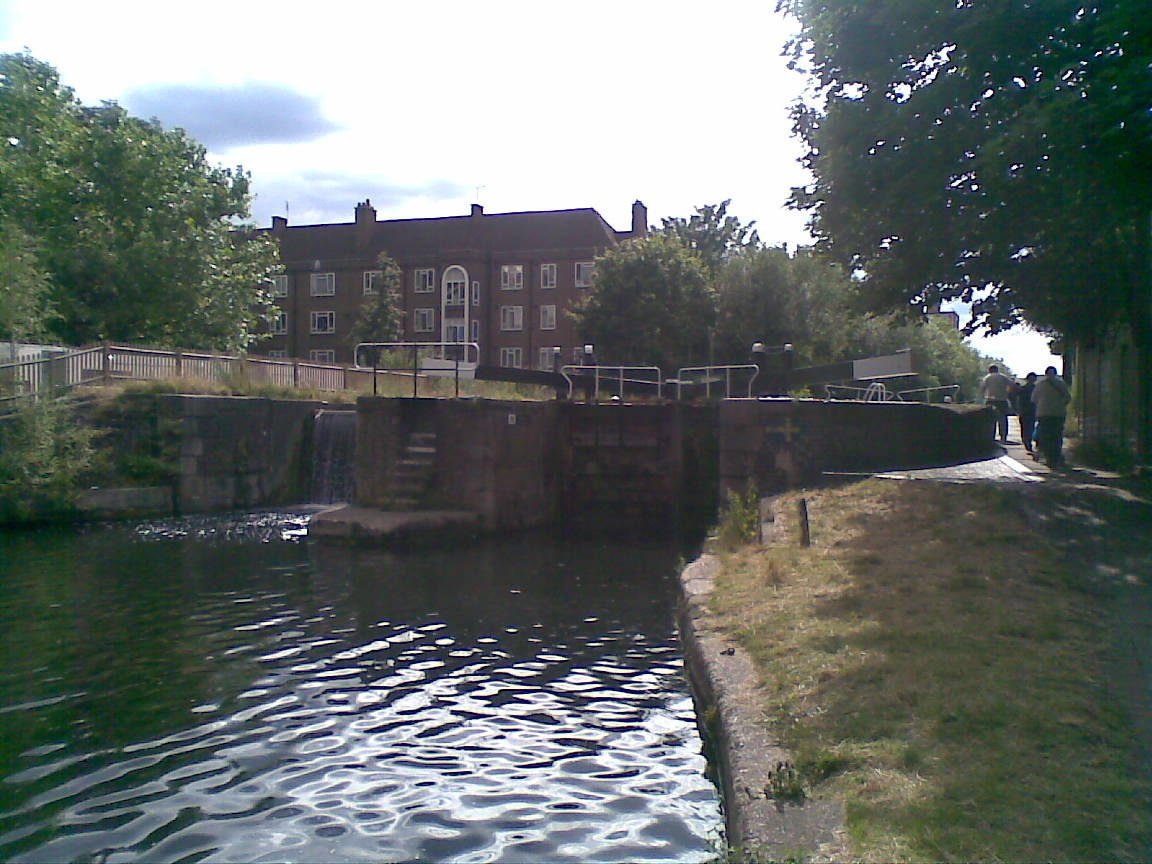
- Acton's Lock, 2008
- 51.535592°N 0.063778°W
- Waterway: Regent's Canal
- County: Hackney; Greater London
- Maintained by: Canal & River Trust
- Fall: 8 feet (2.4 m)
- Distance to Limehouse Basin: 2.5 miles (4.0 km)
- Distance to Paddington Basin: 6.4 miles (10.3 km)

Acton's Lock is a lock on the Regent's Canal in Haggerston, in the London Borough of Hackney.

== See also ==
- Canals of the United Kingdom
- History of the British canal system

Next lock upstream	Regent's Canal	Next lock downstream
Sturt's Lock; No. 6	Acton's Lock; Grid reference: TQ356833	Old Ford Lock; No. 8
