= City Road Lock =

Lock on the Regent's Canal, London

City Road Lock No. 5
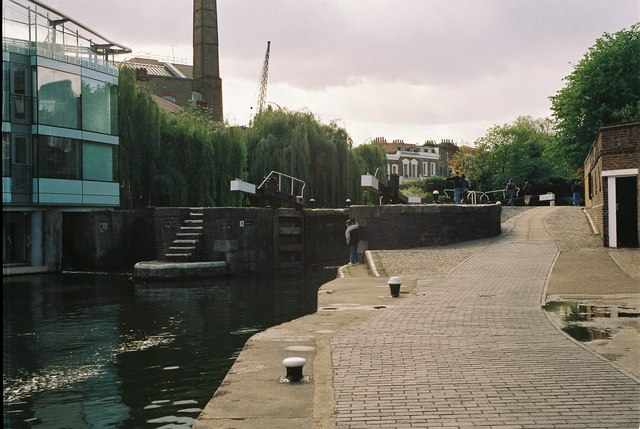
- City Road Lock, 2008
- Interactive map of City Road Lock No. 5
- 51.532652°N 0.098920°W
- Waterway: Regent's Canal
- County: Islington; Greater London
- Maintained by: Canal & River Trust
- Fall: 8 feet (2.4 m)
- Distance to Limehouse Basin: 4 miles (6.4 km)
- Distance to Paddington Basin: 4.9 miles (7.9 km)

City Road Lock is a lock on the Regent's Canal, in the London Borough of Islington, England. It is located a short distance to the east of Islington Tunnel, and immediately to the west of City Road Basin.

== History ==
The Grand Junction Canal reached Paddington Basin in 1801, and various suggestions to link it to the River Thames further to the east were made. Plans for the Regents Canal, from Paddington to Limehouse were eventually agreed, and an act of Parliament to authorise construction, the Regent's Canal Act 1812 (52 Geo. 3. c. cxcv), was obtained on 13 July 1812. The canal opened as far as Camden Town in 1816, but a ridge of higher ground lay between this point and City Road Lock, through which a 960-yard (880 m) tunnel had to be driven. Work started on the tunnel, but the company had insufficient funds to continue and work stopped. Charles Munro, the chairman of the canal company prior to 1816 succeeded in brokering a deal with the Exchequer Bill Loan Commissioners, who loaned £200,000 to help completion of the canal. Work resumed in December 1817, and the canal opened on 1 August 1820. One of the main events of the opening ceremony was the arrival of boats from Manchester, which passed through the lock to reach City Road Basin immediately to the east, discharged their cargoes, and set off again to return to the north.

The lock was well-used, since City Road Basin proved to be much more convenient for goods reaching London than Paddington Basin, and made a huge contribution to the prosperity of the company. Firms moved there from Paddington, including the carriers Pickfords, and it became a distribution centre into central London. The area around the lock became congested, because of the time it took for boats to pass through the adjacent tunnel, but this was partially relieved in 1830, when a towing boat was installed, which wound its way along a chain attached to the bottom of the canal. This system remained in use for over 100 years until the 1930s.

As with all of the other locks on the canal, City Road Lock was built as a pair of locks. The use of paired locks was partly to save water, as water could be transferred between the locks, rather than all of it being discharged into the lower pound when a lock was emptied. This made operation of the locks more complex, and so they were permanently manned during the heyday of the canal, with lock-keepers working a shift system to provide 24-hour cover. As the use of the canal declined, in part due to railway competition, manning levels were reduced, and padlocks were used to prevent operation of the locks at the weekends. Following the end of commercial traffic and the growth of leisure boating, the locks reverted to operation by boat crews, and in order to prevent flooding caused by incorrect operation of the paddles, in the 1980s the gates were removed from the southernmost lock, and a weir and spillway were constructed at the lower end.

== Location ==
In common with all of the locks on the Regents Canal, the fall on the lock is 8 feet (2.4 m). There are visitor moorings between the lock and the tunnel. The lock can be used by boats up to 72 feet (22 m) long, 14.5 feet (4.4 m) wide, and with a draught of 4 feet (1.2 m). The next lock to the west is St Pancras Lock, 1.2 miles (1.9 km) upstream beyond Islington Tunnel and Battlebridge Basin, and the next lock downstream is Sturt's Lock, 0.6 miles (0.97 km) to the east beyond City Road Basin and Wenlock Basin.

The nearest London Underground station is Angel on the Northern line, a short distance to the south west of the tunnel entrance.

== See also ==
- Canals of the United Kingdom
- History of the British canal system

Next lock upstream	Regent's Canal	Next lock downstream
St Pancras Lock; No. 4	City Road Lock; Grid reference: TQ319832	Sturt's Lock; No. 6

== Bibliography ==
- Camden (January 2001). "Regents Canal Conservation Area Statement". Camden Council. Archived from the original on 7 September 2012.
- Cumberlidge, Jane (2009). Inland Waterways of Great Britain (8th Ed.). Imray Laurie Norie and Wilson. ISBN 978-1-84623-010-3.
- Hadfield, Charles (1970). The Canals of the East Midlands. David and Charles. ISBN 978-0-7153-4871-0.
- Nicholson (2006). Nicholson Guides Vol 1: Grand Union, Oxford and the South East. Harper Collins. ISBN 978-0-00-721109-8.
