= Limehouse Basin Lock =

Lock in London Borough of Tower Hamlets, London, England

Limehouse Basin Lock No. 13
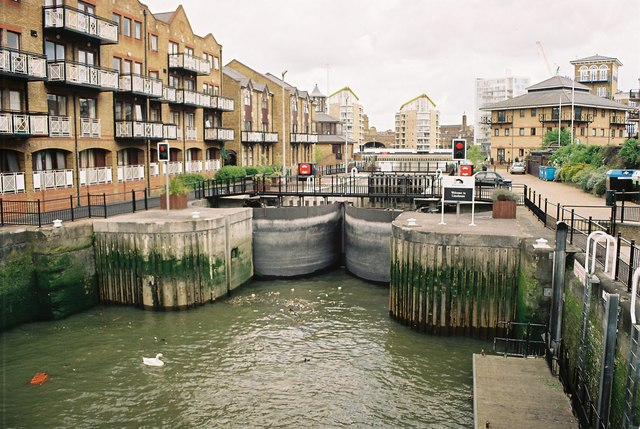
- The lock viewed from Narrow Street Bridge
- 51.510098°N 0.036693°W
- Waterway: Regent's Canal
- County: Tower Hamlets; Greater London
- Maintained by: Canal & River Trust
- Operation: Assisted
- First built: 1820
- Latest built: 1989
- Length: 100 feet (30.5 m)
- Width: 30 feet (9.1 m)
- Fall: tidal
- Distance to Paddington Basin: 9 miles (14.5 km)

Limehouse Basin Lock is a lock forming the exit from Limehouse Basin to the Thames, in the London Borough of Tower Hamlets, England. It is the final lock on the Regent's Canal. The Narrow Street swing bridge sits between the lock and the river.

The current lock was built in 1989 for yachts and pleasure craft, to conserve water in the Basin. It measures 100 feet (30.5 m) by 30 feet (9.1 m) and was built completely within the chamber of the former Ship Lock entrance to the basin. This measured 350 feet (106.7 m) by 60 feet (18.3 m). The original gate-recesses and one of the gates remain in situ, to demonstrate the size of the former lock.

The nearest Docklands Light Railway station is Limehouse.

== See also ==
- Canals of the United Kingdom
- History of the British canal system

Next lock upstream	Regent's Canal	Next lock downstream
Commercial Road Lock; No. 12	Limehouse Basin Lock; Grid reference: TQ363808	None – junction with River Thames
