= Commercial Road Lock =

Lock on the Regent's Canal, in the London Borough of Tower Hamlets

Commercial Road Lock (No.12)
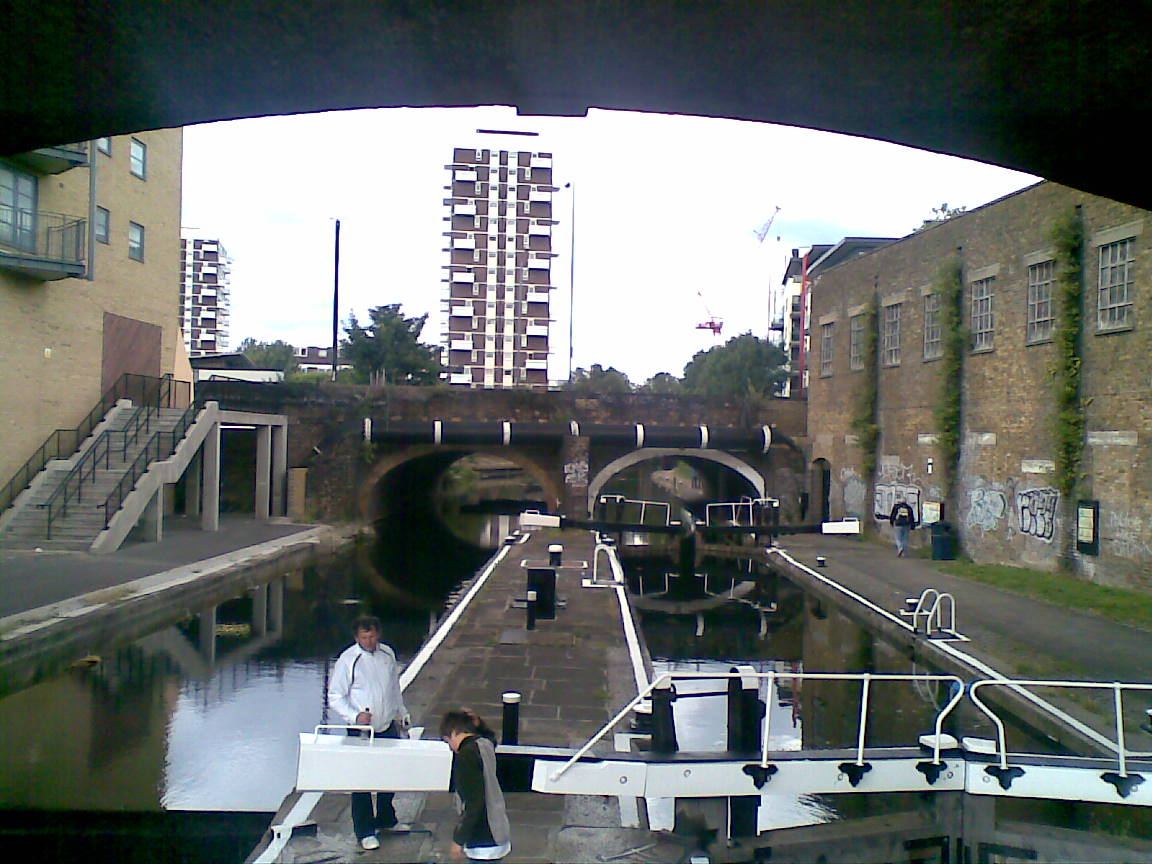
- Commercial Road Lock, 2008
- 51.512362°N 0.036607°W
- Waterway: Regent's Canal
- County: Tower Hamlets; Greater London
- Maintained by: Canal & River Trust
- Fall: 8 feet (2.4 m)
- Distance to Limehouse Basin: 0.13 miles (0.21 km)
- Distance to Paddington Basin: 8.8 miles (14.2 km)

Commercial Road Lock is a lock on the Regent's Canal in the London Borough of Tower Hamlets. It marks the point at which the canal enters Limehouse Basin, and is the penultimate lock before the canal reaches the Thames.

The nearest Docklands Light Railway station is Limehouse.

== Gallery ==
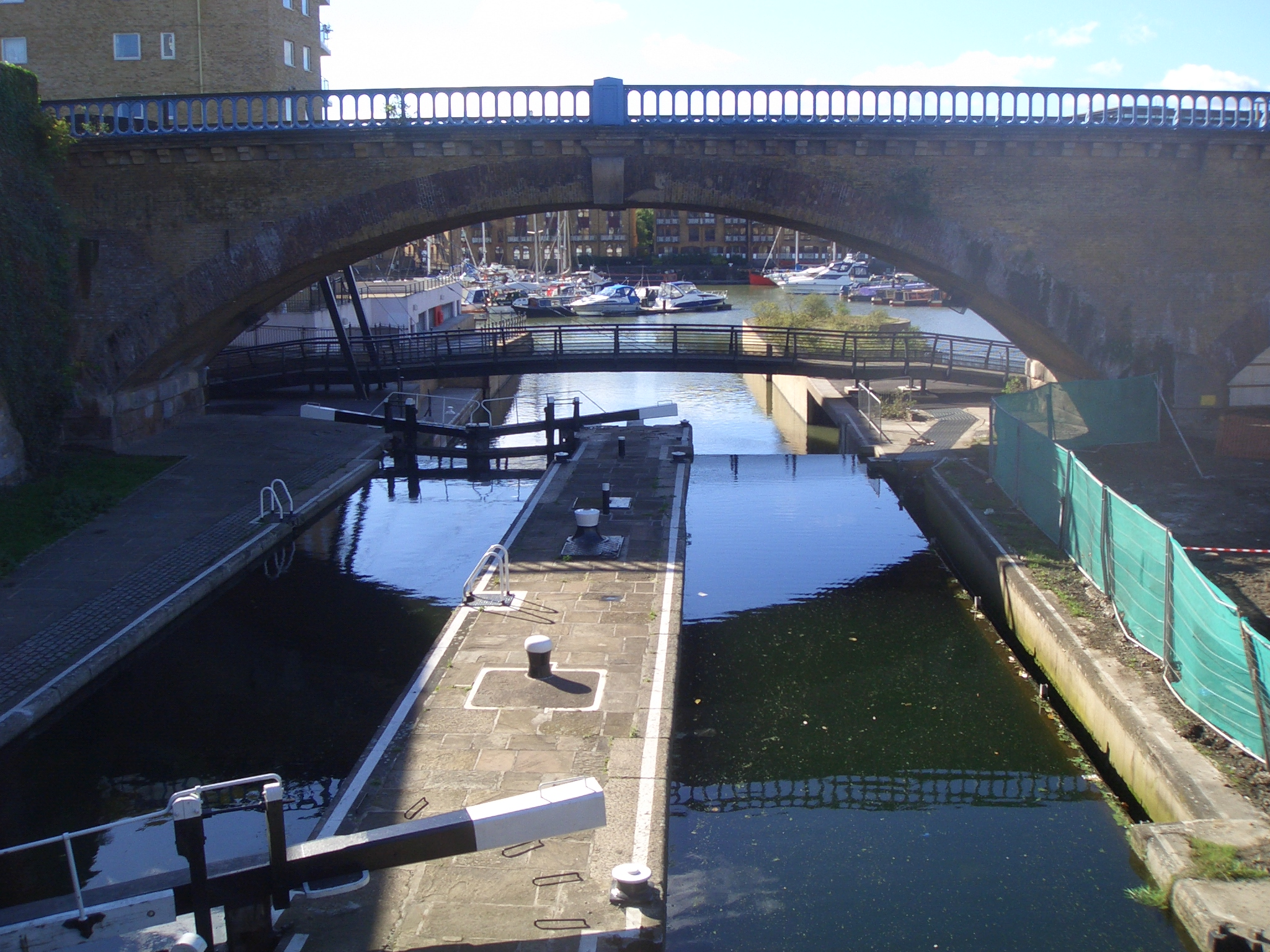
Commercial Road Lock on the Regent's Canal entering the Limehouse Basin

== See also ==
- Canals of the United Kingdom
- History of the British canal system

| Next lock upstream | Regent's Canal | Next lock downstream |
| Salmon Lane Lock; No. 11 | Commercial Road Lock; Grid reference: TQ363810 | Limehouse Lock; No. 13 |
