= Charles Napier Hemy =

British painter (1841–1917)

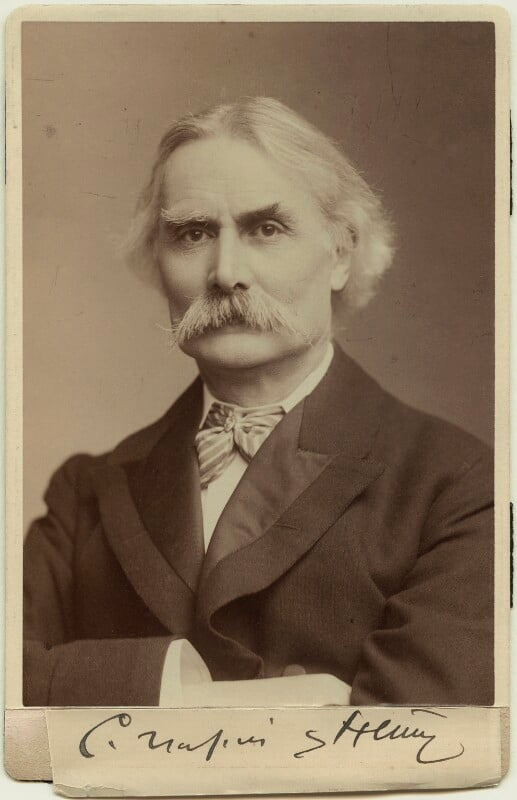
Hemy in the 1900s

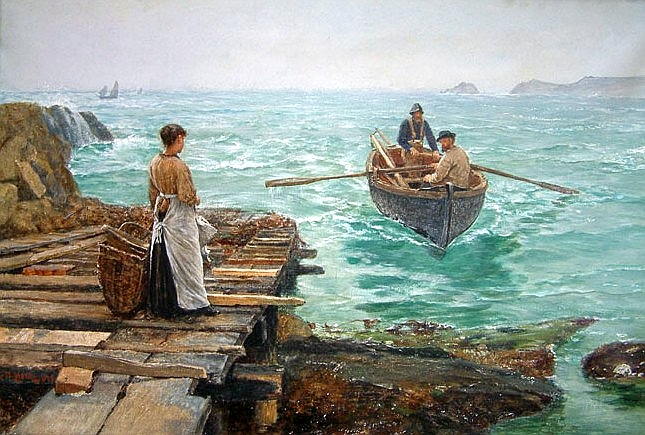
Waiting, an 1895 painting by Hemy

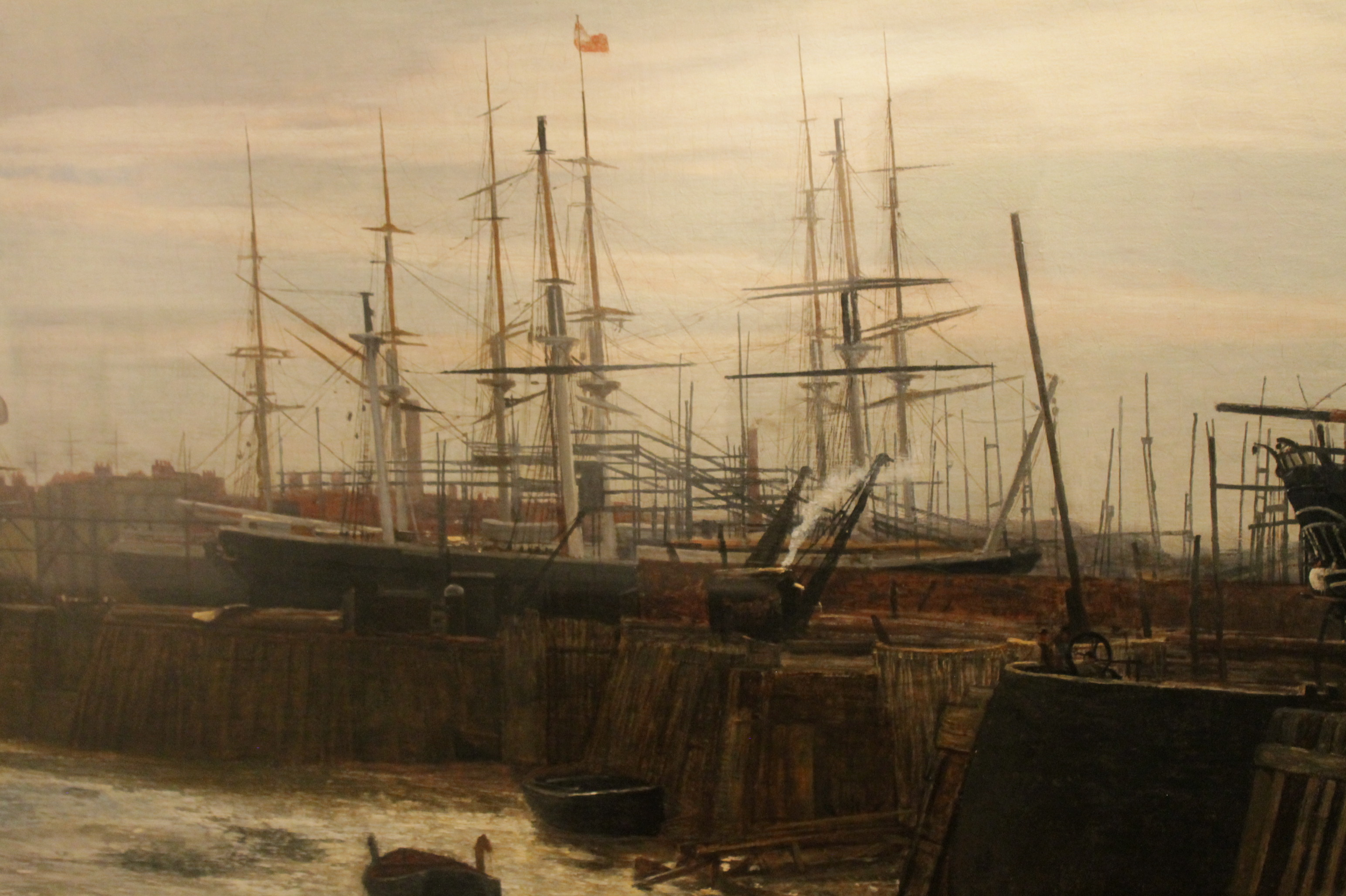
Blackwall by Charles Napier Hemy 1872

Charles Napier Hemy RA (Newcastle upon Tyne, 24 May 1841 – 30 September 1917, Falmouth) was a British genre and marine painter.

He was born to a musical family in Newcastle upon Tyne, and trained in the Government School of Design, Newcastle, followed by the Antwerp Academy and the studio of Baron Leys. Hemy returned to London in the 1870s, and in 1881 moved to the coastal town of Falmouth in Cornwall. He produced painted figure- and landscapes, but his best-known works are Pilchards (1897) and London River (1904) which are in the Tate collections.

John Singer Sargent painted a portrait (now in the Falmouth Art Gallery collection) of Hemy when visiting Hemy's Falmouth home, 'Churchfield', in 1905. The visit highlighted the importance of the circle of artists that surrounded the great marine artist in the town.

Hemy was elected an Associate of the Royal Academy in 1898 and an Academician in 1910. He was also honoured as an Associate of the Royal Society of Painters in Water Colours in 1890, and became a full member in 1897.

He died in Falmouth on 30 September 1917.

His younger brothers Bernard Benedict Hemy (1845–1913) and Thomas Madawaska Hemy (1852–1937) were also painters, though did not match his success.
