= Lee Flood Relief Channel =

River in England

Coordinates: 51.6979°N 0.0134°W

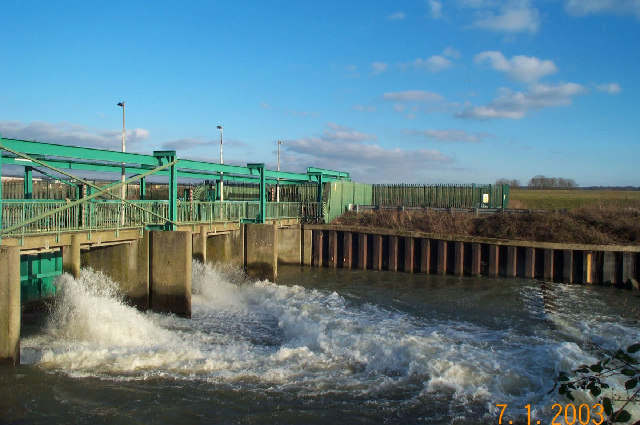
Newmans Sluices on the River Lee Flood Relief Channel, pictured on a day of strong water flow

The Lee Flood Relief Channel (FRC) is located in the Lea Valley and flows between Ware, Hertfordshire, and Stratford, east London. Work started on the channel in 1947 following major flooding and it was fully operational by 1976. The channel incorporates existing watercourses, lakes, and new channels. Water from the channel feeds the Lee Valley Reservoir Chain.

== Design ==
Flood defences are rated according to the probability that a particular level of flood water will be exceeded at least once in a specific period, so a 100-year flood represents a level that would only be expected to occur once in 100 years. This is often known as 1 per cent protection. The level of flooding in 1947 was estimated to be a 1.4 per cent occurrence, and the flood channel, when it was first designed, was built to cope with this level of flooding. Since it was completed in 1976, there have been no major flood events in the Lea Valley, although there have been three occasions when the river system was full virtually to its capacity: in 1987, 1993 and 2000. Since its completion, the level of protection afforded by the structure has declined, so that in some areas it offers 2 per cent protection, and in some, only 5 per cent protection. The Environment Agency published a strategic environmental assessment in 2008, which looked at ways to maintain the flood defences in the Lea Valley.

== Course ==
=== Hertfordshire and Essex ===
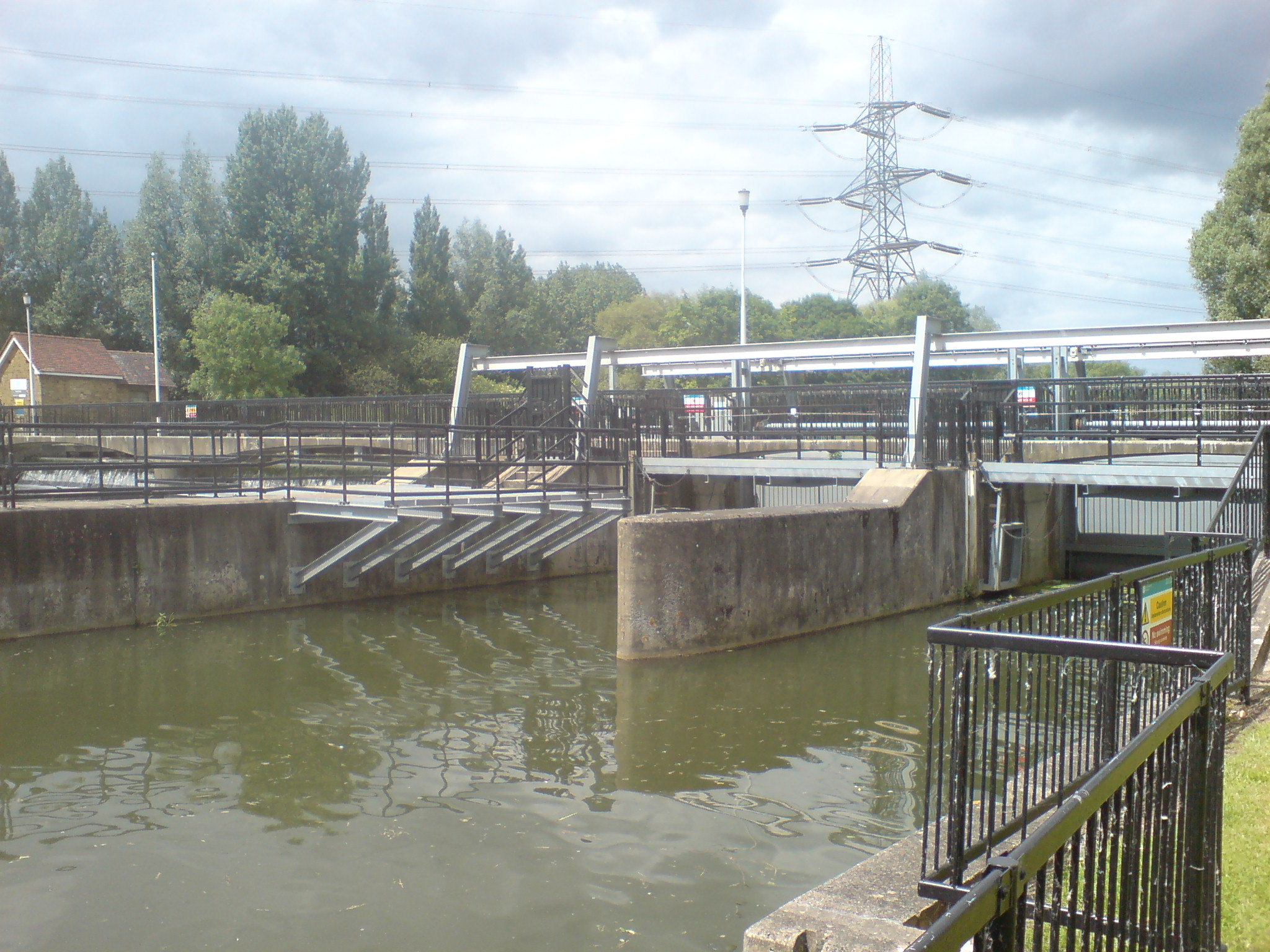
Flood Relief Channel at Feildes Weir

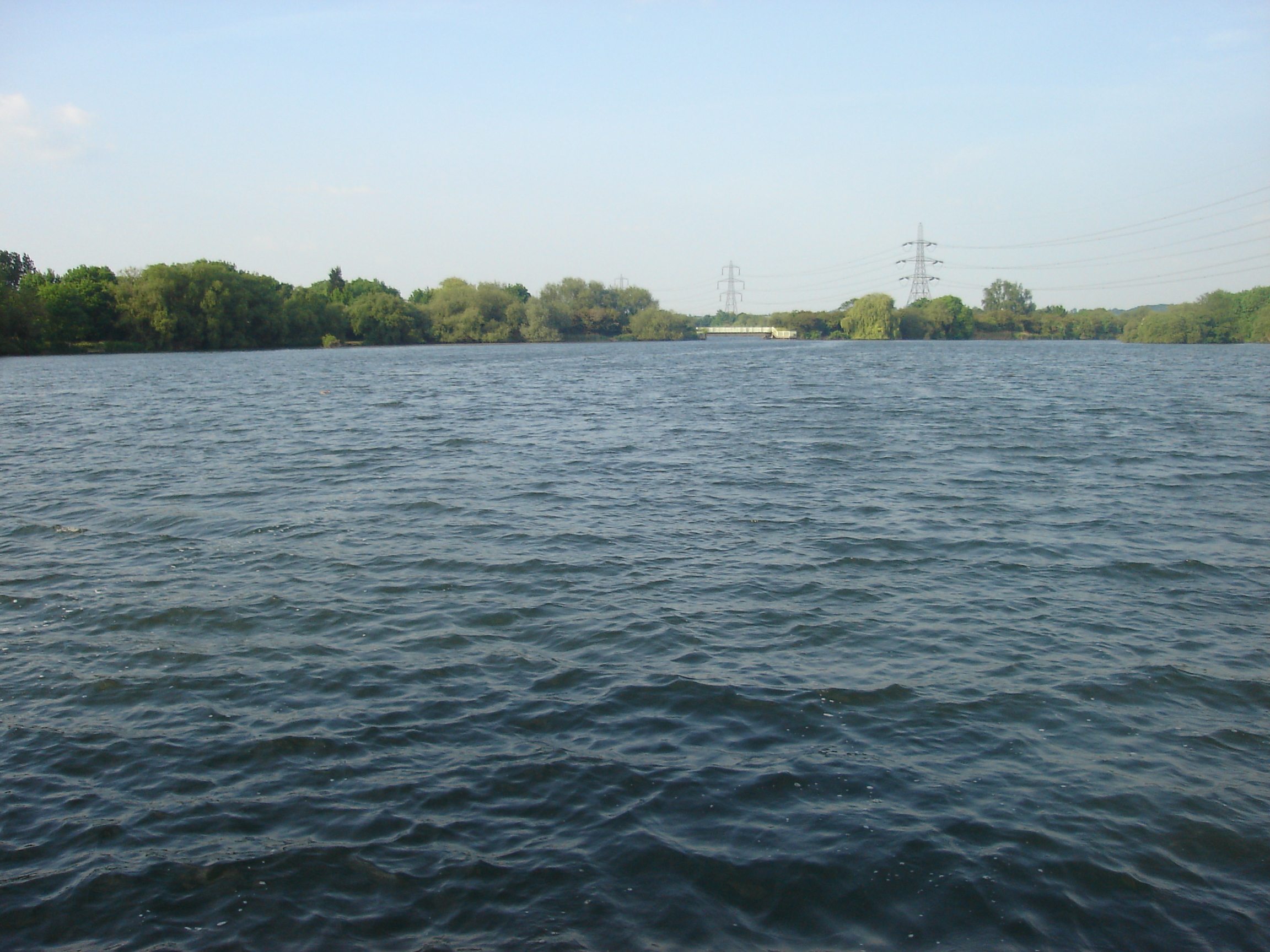
The channel at the Central lagoon, Nazeing Mead, Nazeing

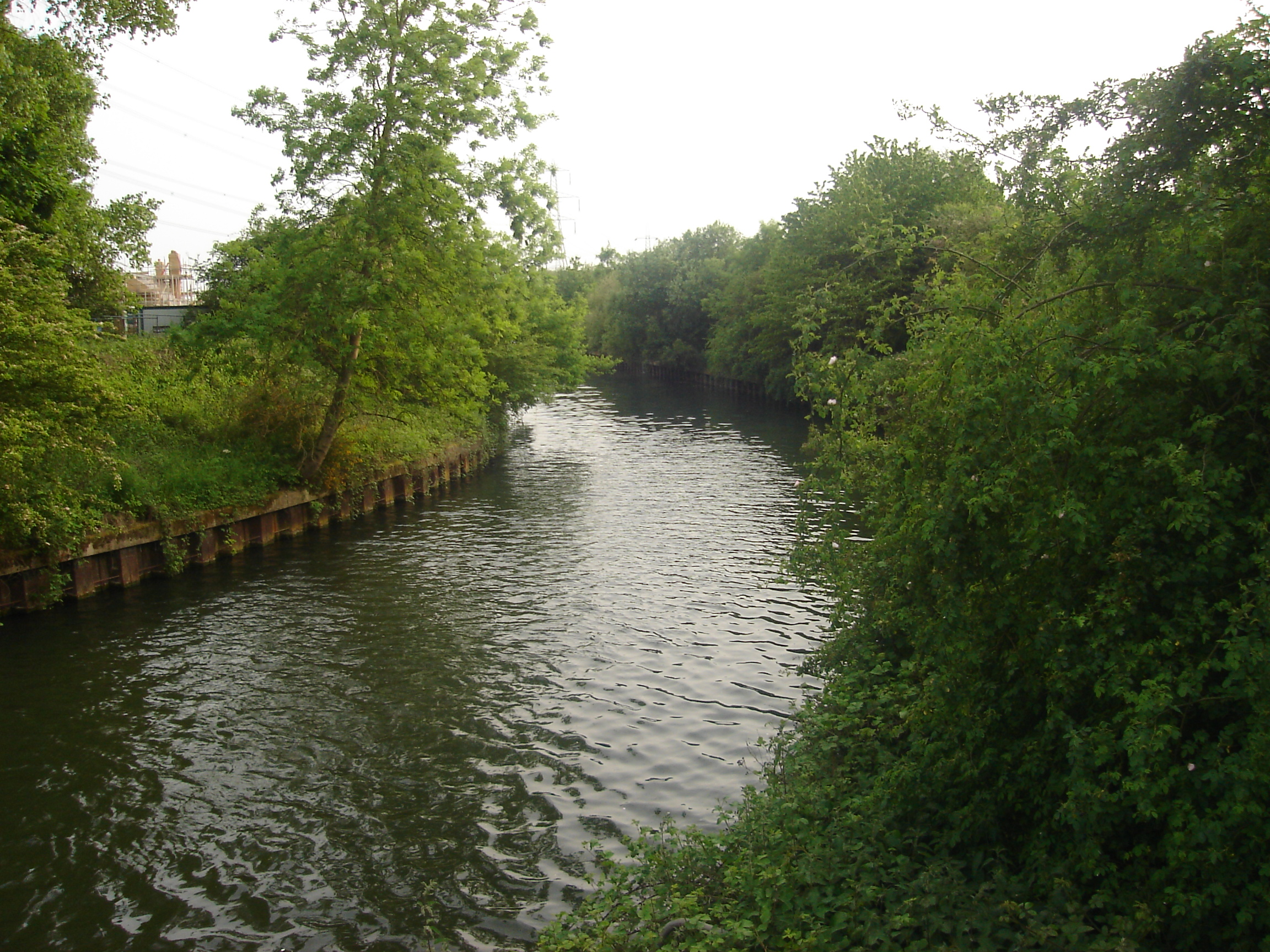
The channel below the B194 road bridge at Nazeing

Marking the start of the FRC at Ware, the channel is incorporated into the Lee Navigation. It flows through Hardmead Lock and Stanstead Lock, which have had automatic sluice gates installed to cope with high water levels. At Feildes Weir a parallel channel has been constructed. The channel then skirts the 120-acre (49 ha) Glen Faba Lake and passes under Dobbs Weir Road before entering the North Lagoon of the Nazeing Meads lake complex and leaving at the South Lagoon at Nazeing Weir. Continuing under Nazeing Road (B194), the channel flows through the River Lee Country Park at Holyfield Lake and out through Holyfield Weir. Flowing under Stubbins Hall Lane, it merges with the old River Lea at Fishers Green. After skirting Seventy Acres Lake and then Hooks Marsh Lake, the channel is incorporated into the Horsemill Stream, also known as Waltons Walk. The water forms a natural boundary for the Royal Gunpowder Mills as it passes through the mechanically controlled radial gates of the David Stoker sluice near Waltham Abbey. Now flowing parallel with the Lee Navigation, and only yards apart, the channel flows firstly under the A121 road and through Rammey Marsh Sluice - a set of three computer-controlled vertical lift sluice gates and then under the M25 motorway to be joined by Cobbins Brook before flowing through Newman's Sluice – a set of four computer-controlled vertical lift sluice gates.

=== Greater London ===
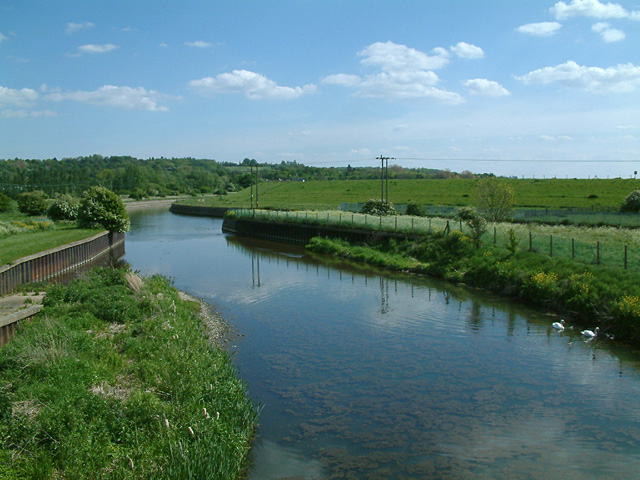
The confluence of the River Lee Flood Relief Channel in foreground with the River Lea to become the River Lee Diversion below Enfield Island Village before flowing around the eastern perimeter of the King George V Reservoir

The channel crosses Rammey Marsh to form the eastern boundary of the former Royal Small Arms Factory, which is now a housing development called Enfield Island Village. Further downstream, the channel merges with the River Lea to become the man-made, concrete-banked River Lee Diversion as it skirts the eastern perimeter of the King George V Reservoir, the first of the Lee Valley Reservoir Chain, and then the William Girling Reservoir. The river forms the boundary of the London Borough of Enfield and Waltham Forest and the historical boundary between Middlesex and Essex. Flowing under the North Circular Road and close to Banbury Reservoir, it splits from the River Lee Diversion to cross Tottenham Marshes, and passes close to the Lockwood Reservoir, High Maynard Reservoir and Low Maynard Reservoir. Flowing firstly under Forest Road (A503 road) and then the Gospel Oak to Barking line, it skirts the Walthamstow Reservoirs close to Walthamstow Marshes. It passes under Coppermill Lane before flowing under the Lea Valley Line as the channel approaches Lea Bridge Road, part of the A104 road. It crosses Hackney Marshes and passes through a culvert before joining the Old River Lea close to the New Spitalfields Market. Passing under the Eastway road and then flowing under the A115 (Carpenter's Road) to meet the Waterworks River below Carpenter's Road Lock in Stratford, the channel continues through the Prescott Channel and Bow Creek to reach the Thames at Leamouth.
