= Walthamstow Marshes =

Marsh in London, England

Coordinates: 51.570606°N 0.049861°W

- Site of Special Scientific Interest
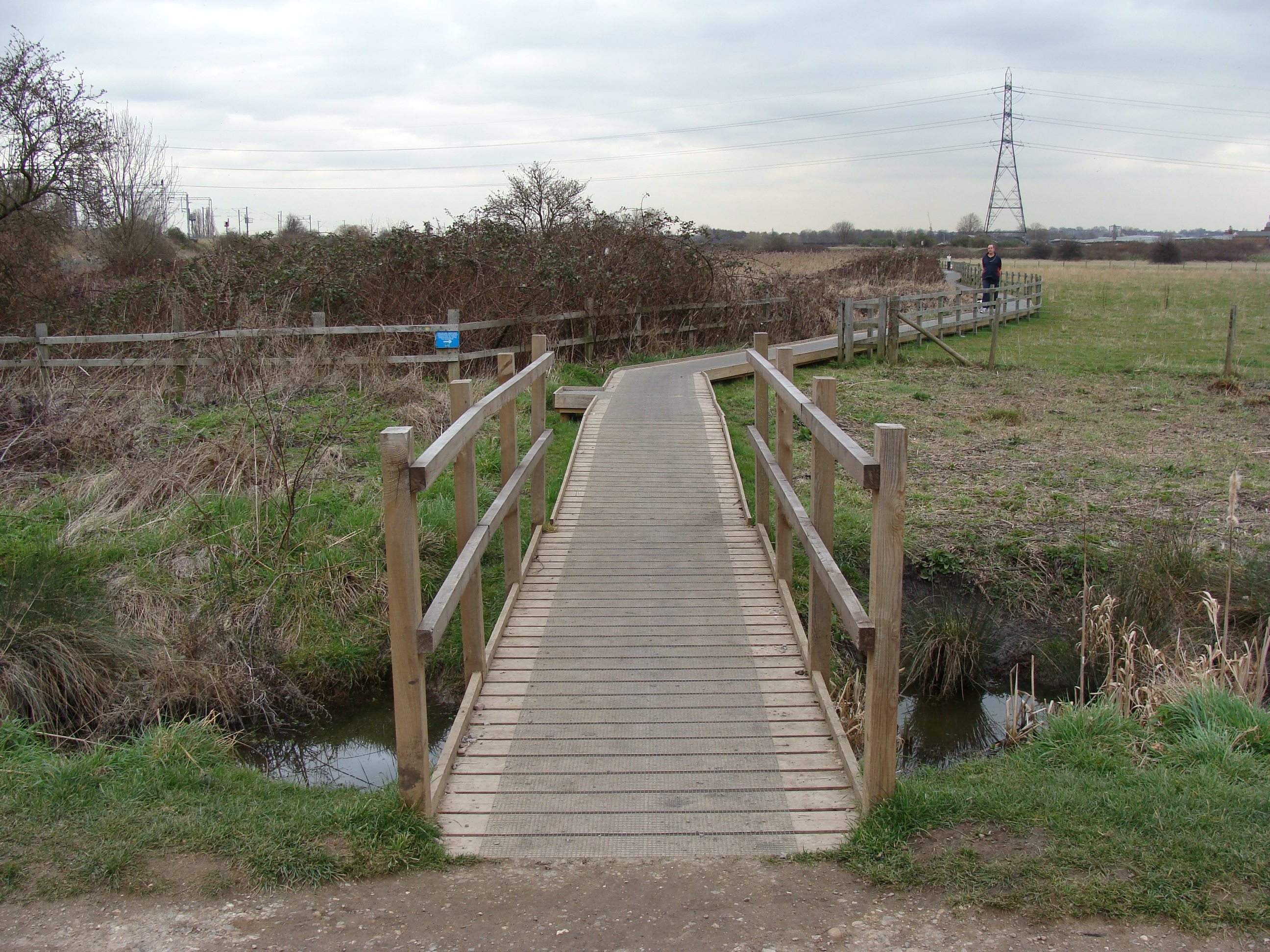
- Boardwalk across an environmental protection area
- Location of Walthamstow Marshes.
- Area of search: Greater London
- Grid reference: TQ352875
- Interest: Biological
- Area: 36.7 ha (91 acres)
- Notification date: 1985
- Location map: Magic Map

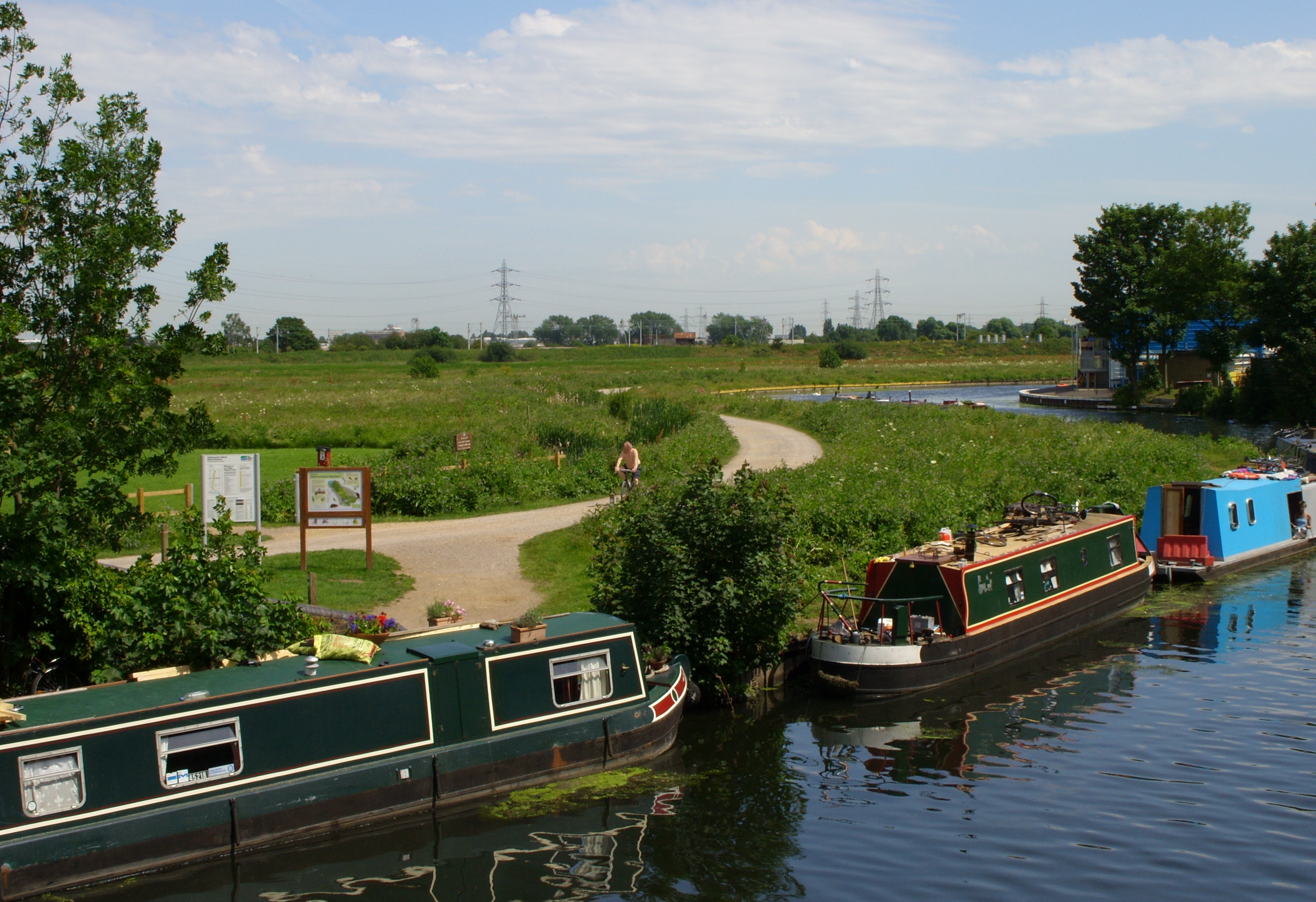
Walthamstow Marshes

Walthamstow Marshes, is a 36.7-hectare (91-acre) biological Site of Special Scientific Interest in Walthamstow in the London Borough of Waltham Forest. It was once an area of lammas land – common land used for growing crops and grazing cattle.

== In aviation history ==
In 1909, the aero-designer Alliott Verdon Roe made the first all-British powered flight across the marsh in a Roe I Triplane (his earlier Roe I Biplane had been fitted with a French motorcycle engine). He went on to found the Avro Company, with his brother, in Manchester. A blue plaque records his achievement, on the railway arch in which he had his workshop.

== Geography ==
The River Lea forms the boundary with the London Borough of Hackney, and the marshes lie within the Lee Valley Park. South of the Walthamstow Marshes lie the Leyton Marshes, and to the north the remains of Tottenham Marshes, parts of which are now the Banbury Reservoir. North of Coppermill Lane, are the linked set of Lockwood Reservoir, High Maynard Reservoir, Low Maynard Reservoir, Walthamstow Reservoirs, East Warwick Reservoir and West Warwick Reservoirs. The 90.7 acres (36.7 ha) area of Walthamstow Marshes south of these escaped both development and use for gravel excavation, remaining a relatively untouched refuge for wildlife, crossed only by the railway lines in 1840 and 1870.

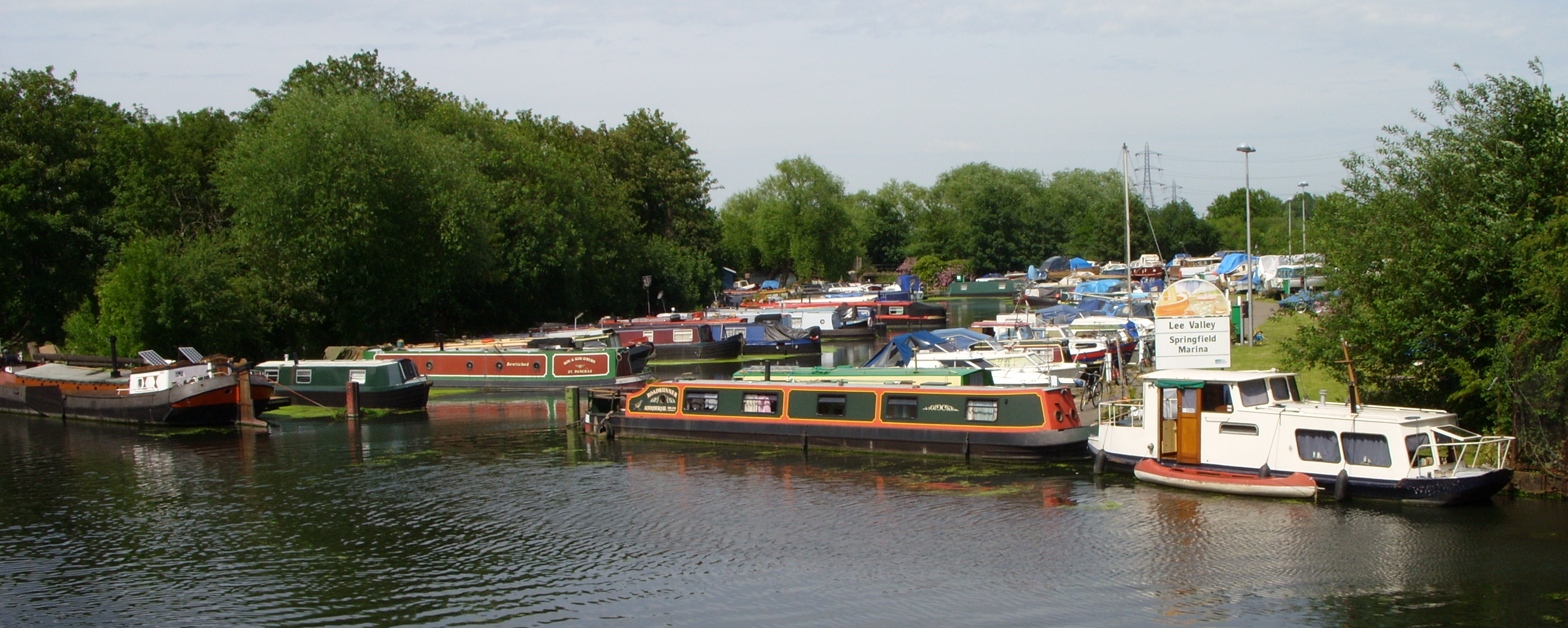
Springfield Marina on Walthamstow Marshes

The marshes are one of the last remaining examples of semi-natural wetland in Greater London. They contain a variety of plant communities typical of a former flood plain location, such as a range of neutral grassland types, sedge marsh, reed swamp, sallow scrub and areas of tall herb vegetation. Associated with this diversity of habitat are several species of plant and insect which are uncommon in the London area.

== Wildlife ==
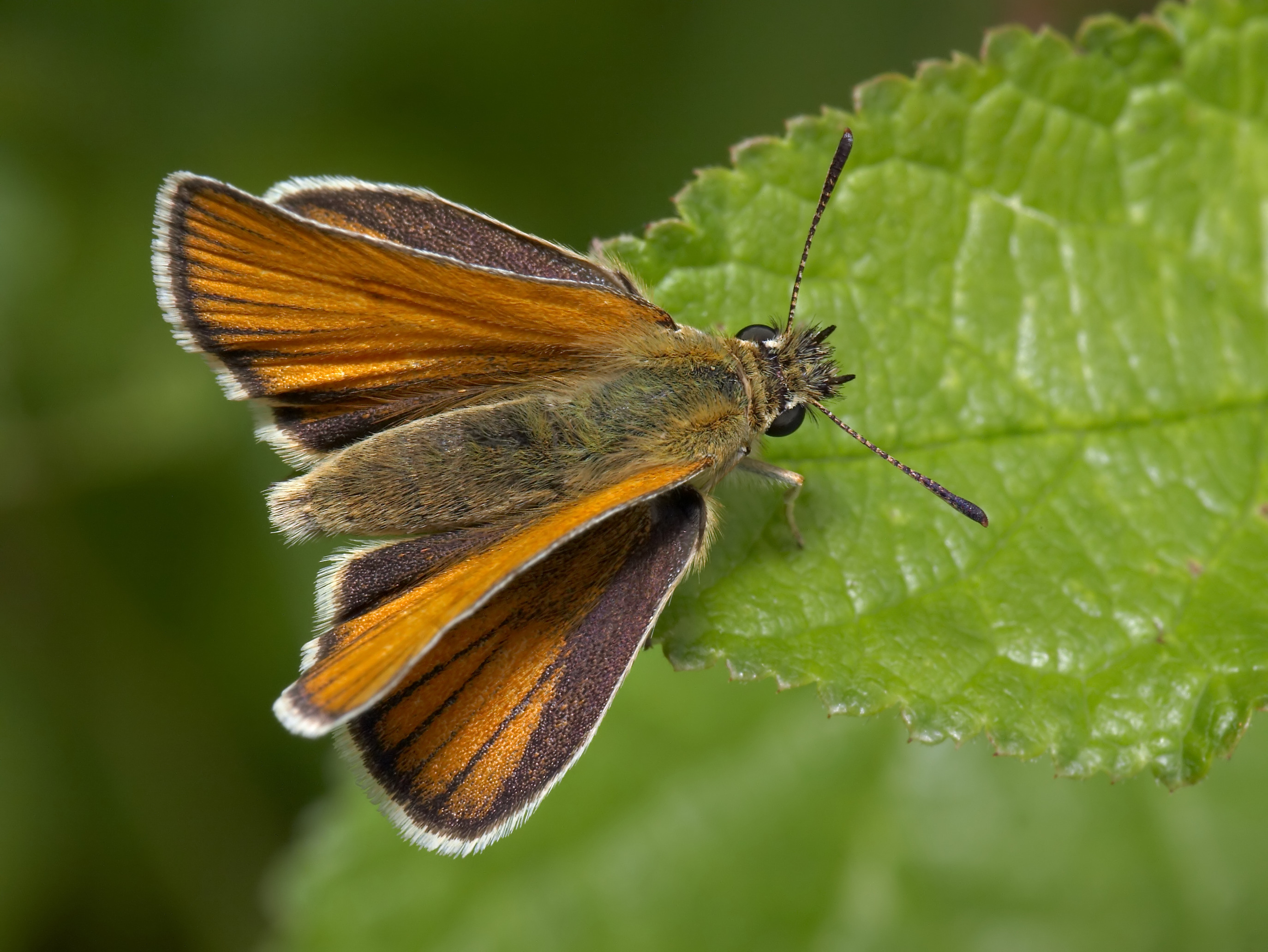
Essex skipper butterfly

The marshes contain several species of insect with a restricted distribution in the London area such as the Essex skipper butterfly Thymelicus lineola, an uncommon Parasite fly Ligeria angusticornis, a pyralid moth Shoeribius micronellus and the sporadic breeding by the nationally endangered marsh warbler.

The breeding bird community contains several species typically associated with marshland habitats such as reed bunting, and reed, sedge and willow warblers. A variety of wintering birds visit the marshes and neighbouring reservoirs while in autumn flocks of finches are to be found feeding on the seeds of the tall herbs.

== Split Leaf ==
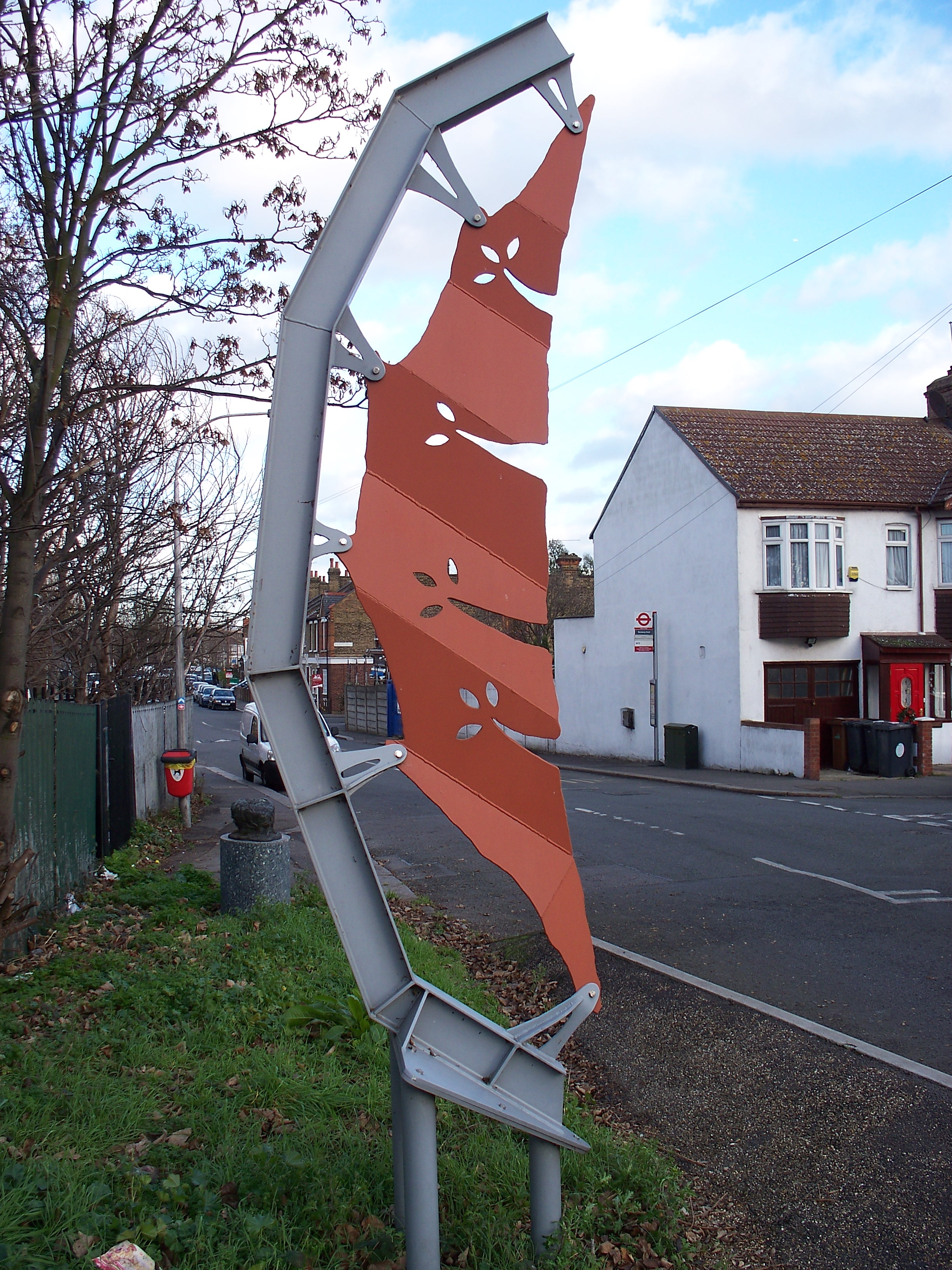
Northern half of Split Leaf

Split Leaf, a sculpture by Jon Mills, marks the formal entrance to the marshes. The sculpture was made in spring 2003 by Jon Mills in conjunction with pupils from Coppermill Primary School and Mission Grove Primary School, as part of the "Take pART" programme. It was intended to form a gateway to the park and to the marshes beyond.

== See also ==
- List of Sites of Special Scientific Interest in Greater London
- Parks and open spaces in Waltham Forest
- Bomb Crater Pond (Walthamstow)
- Hackney Marshes
- Walthamstow Wetlands
