= Coppermills Water Treatment Works =

Water treatment works in east London

Coordinates: 51.5765°N 0.0461°W

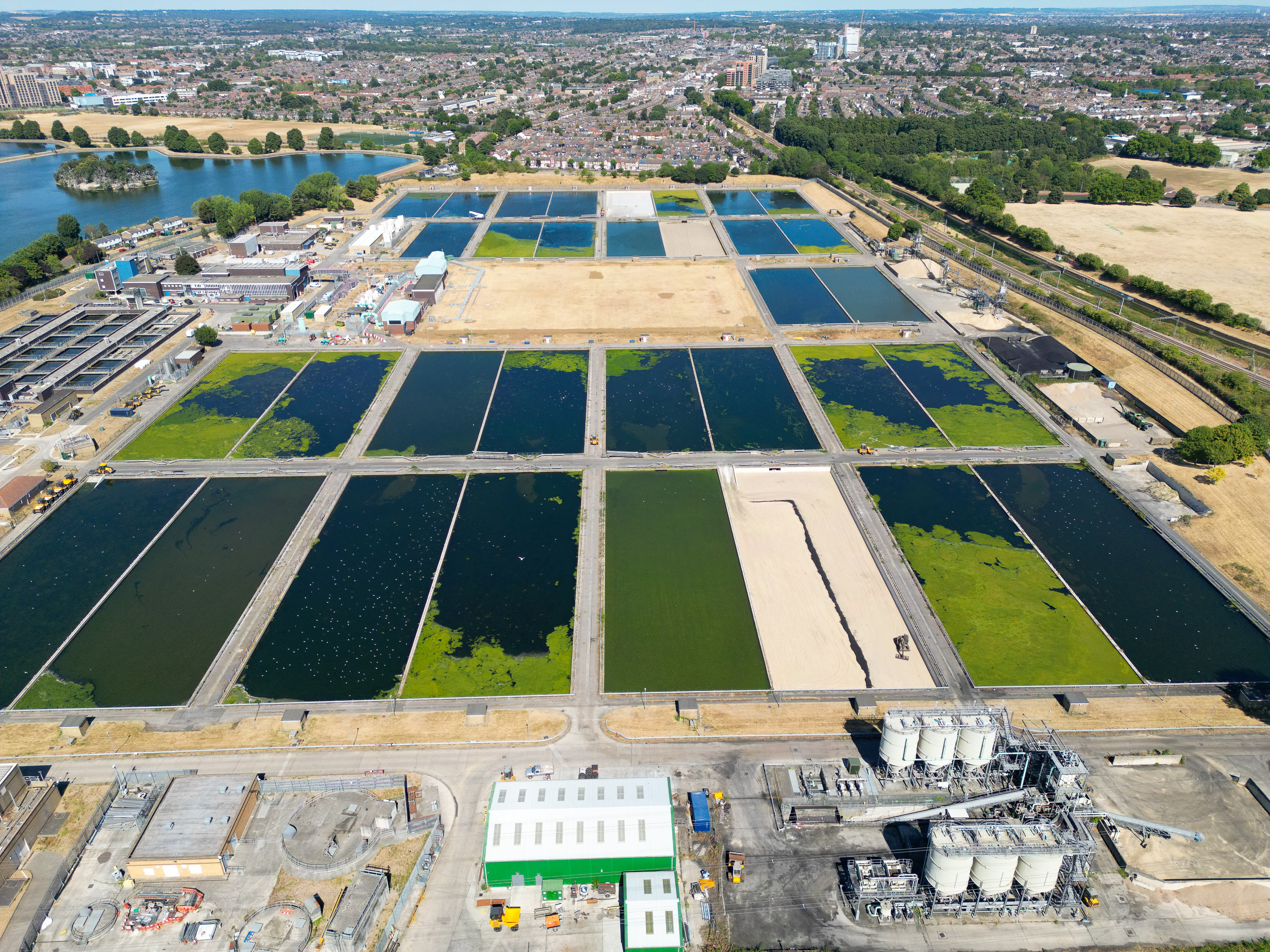
Aerial view of Coppermills Water Treatment Works

The Coppermills Water Treatment Works is a large water treatment works in the Lea Valley in east London. Completed in 1969 by the Metropolitan Water Board, it is now owned and operated by Thames Water. In 2009, Coppermills was connected to the Thames Water Ring Main via the Northern Extension Tunnel, enabling the facility to be a major supplier of water to the whole London area. It is capable of supplying a maximum of 680 million litres (150,000,000 imp gal; 180,000,000 US gal) of water per day.

== Water source ==
The facility draws water from the Lee Valley Reservoir Chain located directly to the north, which sources its water from the River Lea, the New River, and the River Thames (via the Thames-Lee Water Main).

Water flows to Coppermills directly through channels from the East Warwick, Low Maynard, and Walthamstow No. 5 reservoirs. It is also supplied via the Coppermill Stream and the ‘Spine Tunnel’ which is fed from the Lockwood, King George V, William Girling and Banbury reservoirs further north.

== Operations ==
The first water treatment process at Coppermills works is rapid gravity filtration. There are 24 rectangular open topped tanks containing sand. Water enters the top of the tanks and flows down through the sand layer under gravity. The water residence time in the filters is about 15 minutes. The filters remove particulates and the cleaned water flows from the bottom of the filters. Periodically, every 6 to 24 hours each filter is shut in and clean water is pumped up through the bed together with compressed air to scour the sand and remove material caught during the filtration phase. When the backwashing process is complete the filter is bought back into service.

Ozone gas is then added to the water to oxidise contaminants such as pesticides and organic material. The process of ozonization also kills bacteria. Water then flows to the next stage Slow Sand Filtration.

There are 33 slow sand filter beds at Coppermills water treatment works, which occupy much of the site. The sand bed in the filters support a gelatinous biofilm or hypogeal layer in the top few millimetres of the sand. The surface biofilm provides an effective biological treatment. Water passes through the hypogeal layer where contaminants are retained and metabolised by the bacteria, fungi and protozoa. Over several weeks the biofilm becomes thicker and the flow of water reduces. The filter bed is drained and the biofilm layer is scraped off and replaced with fresh sand.

The water then passes through fine 400-micron (400 μm) stainless steel mesh screens. The water is then dosed with chlorine in contact tanks which contain baffles to ensure that chlorine is completely mixed with the water. Chlorine destroys harmful micro-organisms. The water is pumped into the distribution system supplying customers directly or through covered service reservoirs.

Problems occur at treatment works during periods of algal bloom in the reservoirs, which reduce the cycle time of the rapid gravity filters. At Coppermills works this reduces the capacity of the plant from its normal throughput of 560 million litres per day to 380 Ml/d. A new (£46 million) plant was commissioned in 2014 providing 12 rapid gravity filters with a capacity of 200 Ml/d.
