= Coppermill Stream =

Waterway in East London

Coordinates: 51.58489°N 0.05442°W

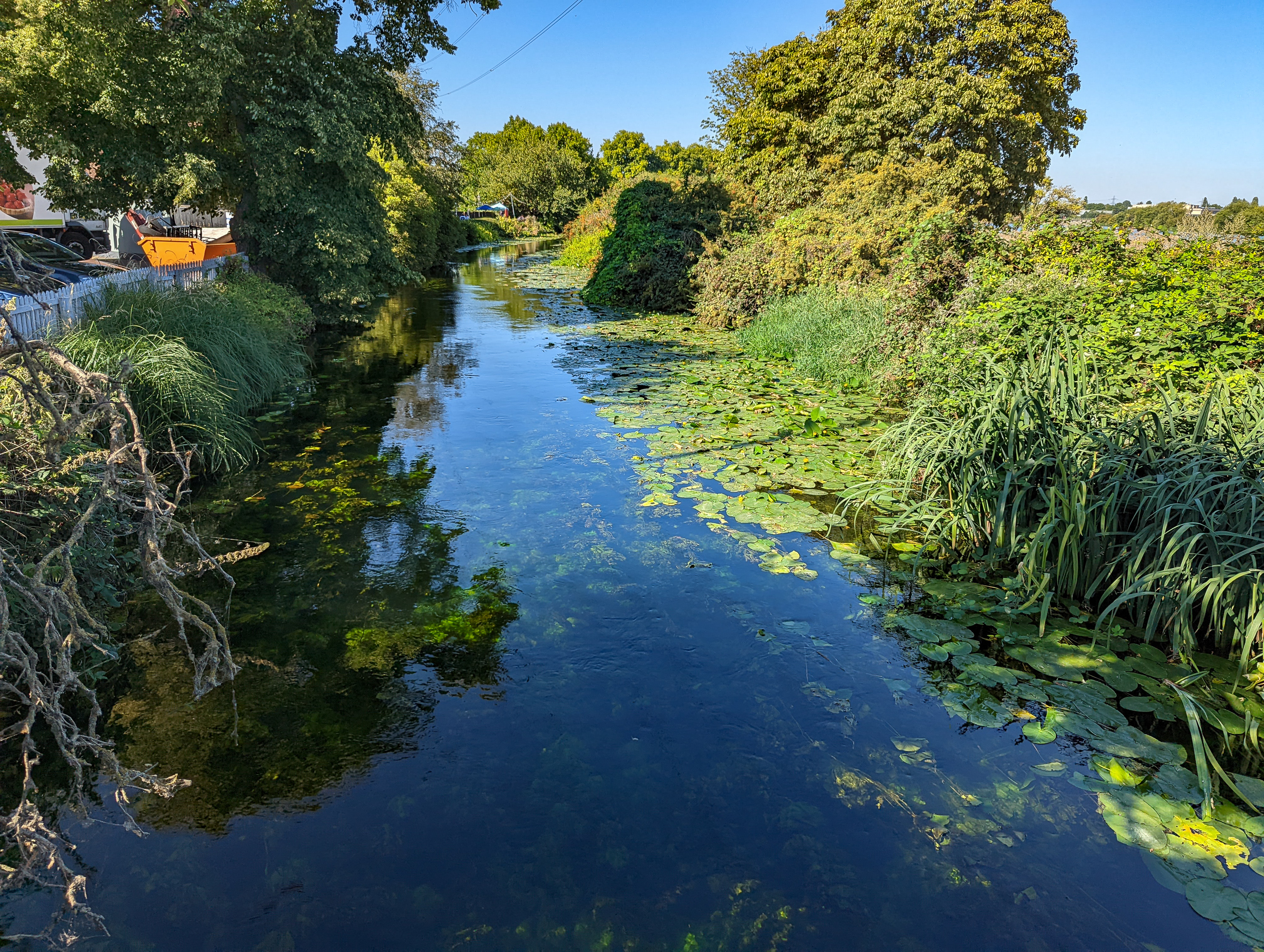
The Coppermill Stream at Tottenham

The Coppermill Stream is a short waterway near Walthamstow in the Lea Valley. Originally a minor tributary of the River Lea, the approximately 2-mile (3.2 km) long stream is now used as an aqueduct to transport water from the reservoirs in the Lea Valley to Coppermills Water Treatment Works. The stream is part of a Site of Metropolitan Importance.

== Course ==
Rising close to and fed by water from the Lockwood Reservoir, the stream flows in a southerly direction under Ferry Lane A503 and the Gospel Oak to Barking line and continues between the Walthamstow Reservoirs and the East Warwick Reservoir. It then passes the Coppermill and close to the Coppermills Water Treatment Works. It then flows parallel with Coppermill Lane and skirts the northern edge of Walthamstow Marshes, passing under the Lea Valley lines and merging with the River Lee Navigation at the Lee Valley Marina close opposite Springfield Park.

== Coppermill ==
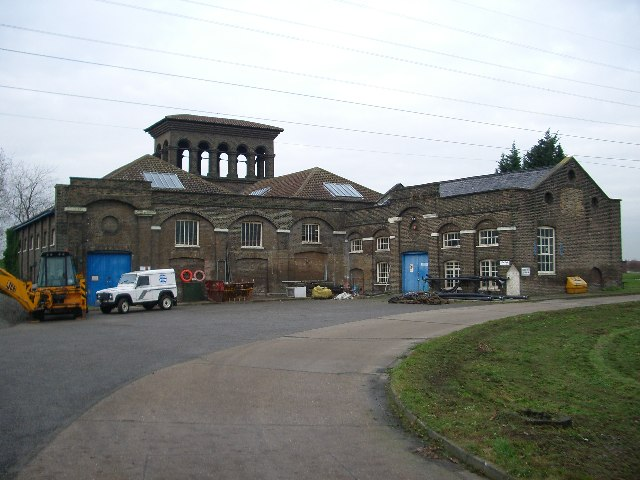
The Coppermill

The stream is named after the Coppermill, a watermill which was purchased by the British Copper Company in 1808. Before milling copper, the mill can be traced back to the 14th century when it was initially used for grinding corn. In the 1670s it was used in the production of gunpowder, in 1690 for rolling paper. In 1712 it was a leather mill and was next used in the manufacture of linseed oil. The mill was purchased from the British Copper Company by the East London Waterworks Company in the late 1850s and was modified to drive a water pump to assist in the building of reservoirs on the nearby marshland. Today it is owned by Thames Water.

== Coppermills Water Treatment Works ==
Towards the southern end of the Coppermill Stream, water is removed for use at the nearby Coppermills Water Treatment Works, operated by Thames Water.

== Ecology ==
The clean flowing stream is home to many species of coarse fish including the barbel.

== Recreation ==
Day tickets are available for angling.
