= Lower Lea Valley =

Southern end of the Lea Valley in Greater London

Coordinates: 51°33′N 0°1′W

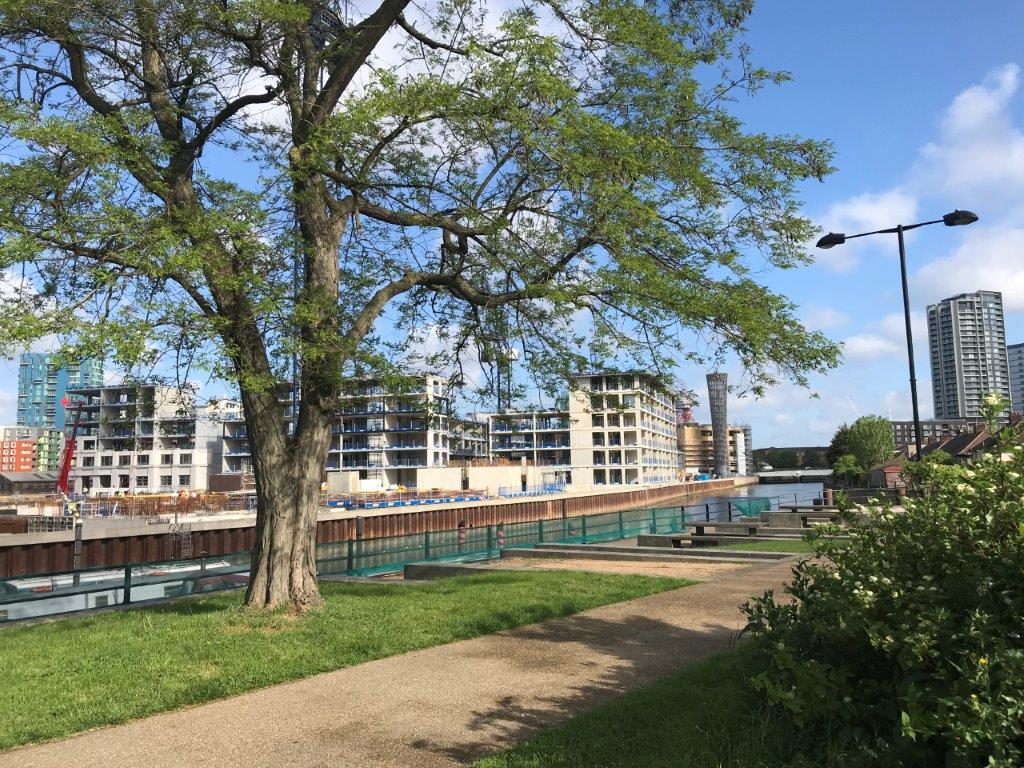
Canal towpath overlooking Three Mills Wall River with a view across to Sugar House Island

The Lower Lea Valley is the southern end of the Lea Valley which surrounds the River Lea in eastern Greater London. It is part of the Thames Gateway redevelopment area and was the location of the 2012 Summer Olympics.

== Geography ==
The Lower Lea Valley can be described as the part to the south of the long chain of reservoirs which end with the East and West Warwick Reservoirs. The Lea changes course at this point, changing from a SSW to a SSE direction for the last 5 miles (8.0 km) before its confluence with the Thames at Leamouth and Canning Town.

The north-west of the area is in the London Borough of Hackney, the south-east is in the London Borough of Newham, the south-west is in the London Borough of Tower Hamlets, and the north-east is in the London Borough of Waltham Forest.

== Parkland ==
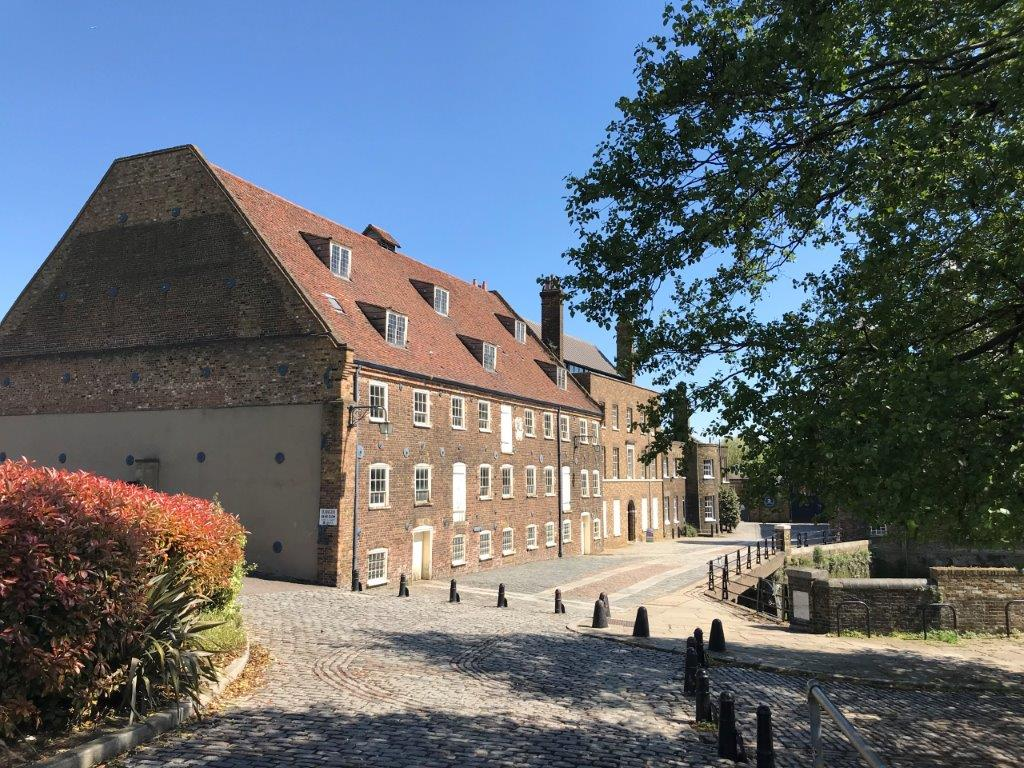
Three Mills is a former working tidal mill mentioned in the Domesday book.

The Lower Lea includes Hackney Marshes and the Lea River Park, a collection of six parks which connect Queen Elizabeth Olympic Park to the Royal Docks and the River Thames; linked by the Leaway.

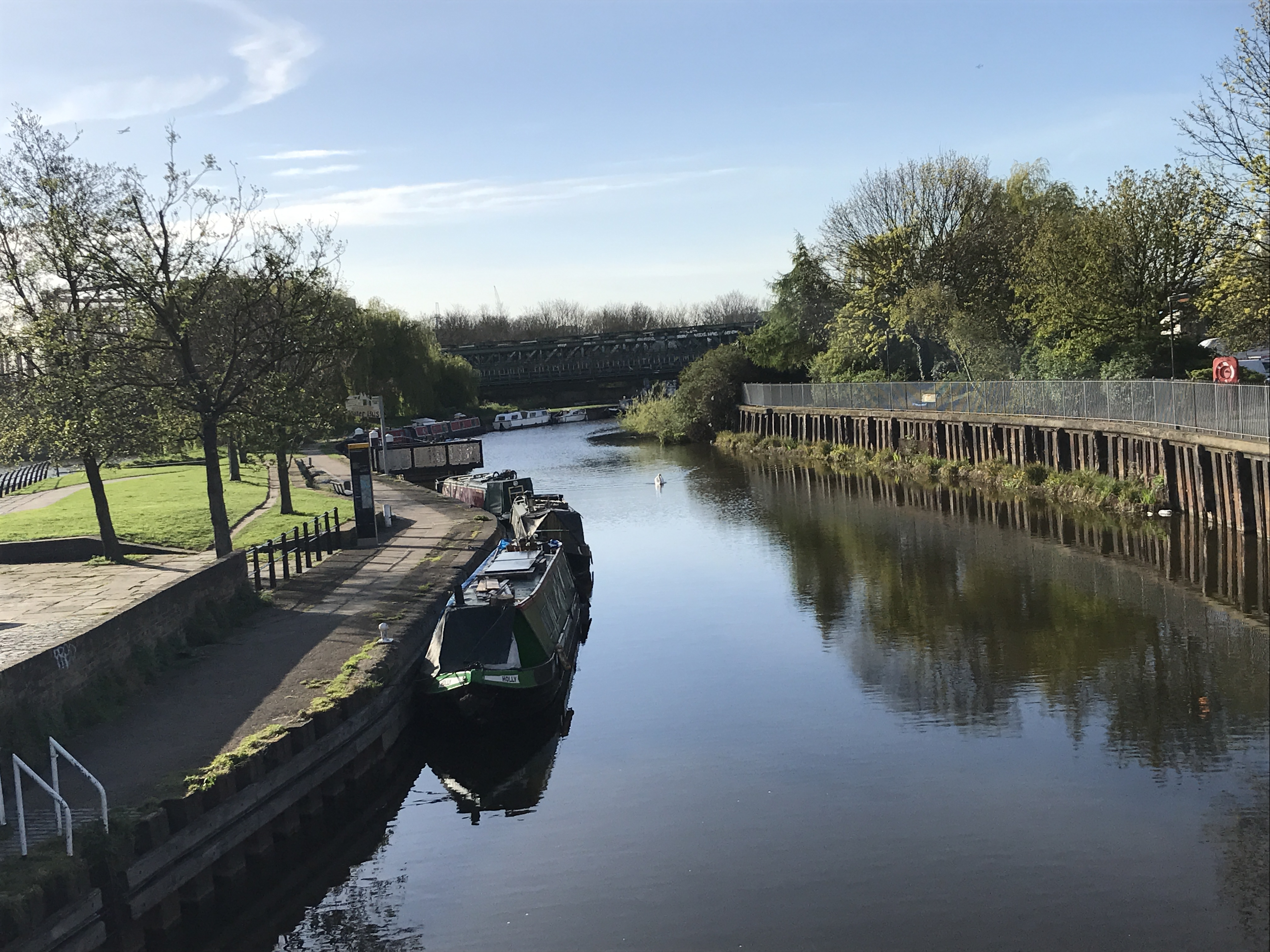
Three Mills Lane, looking out from the tide mill

The redevelopment of the Lea River Park opens up 45 acres (18 ha) of new space creating walkways and cycle paths. The project completes the 26-mile long Lee Valley Regional Park which connects Ware in Hertfordshire to the River Thames.

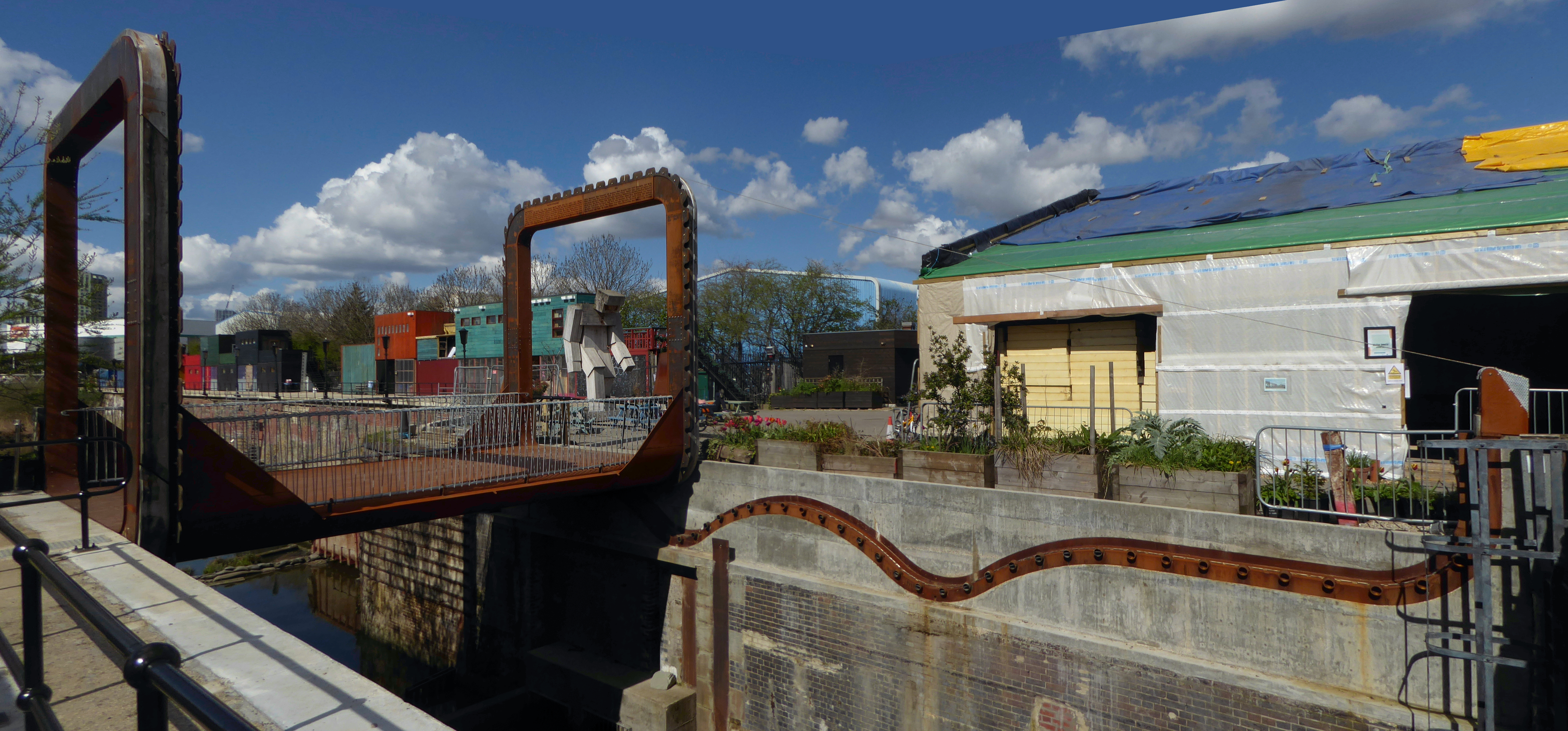
Photo of the Cody Dock Rolling Bridge

It takes an hour to walk the entire Lea River Park with the opportunity to stop off and learn about some of the area's rich history, including:

- Dane's Yard – the first phase of Vastint's 26 acres (11 ha) Sugar House Island project. Dane's Yard is a Conservation Area sensitively being refurbished into a business hub for creative industries. The Sugar House, a Victorian warehouse on site, is one of the development's buildings being refurbished.
- Three Mills – a beautiful and historic area which is home to the world's biggest tide mill (which was listed in the Domesday Book). The mills were originally used to grind grain for flour (Stratford bakers were renowned and mentioned by Chaucer). Later the mills ground grain to make gin, and a large distillery was set up on Three Mills Island. Owned at the time by Nicholson, it fuelled the Gin Craze in London. The distillery is now 3 Mills Studios, an independent film studio, home of MasterChef and many British-made films.
- Bow Ecology Park – a thriving wildlife sanctuary with newts, water scorpions and flocks of wading birds.
- Trinity Buoy Wharf – home to London's only lighthouse.
- Cody Dock – with Rolling Bridge – a formerly derelict dock which is being transformed into a thriving creative community space.
- The banks of the Lea at the Bow Brewery where India Pale Ale was first brewed.

== Redevelopment areas ==
Responsibility for the redevelopment of most of the area was under the remit of the London Thames Gateway Development Corporation until 2012. The area around the Olympic site is now under the control of the London Legacy Development Corporation. Part of the area is an enterprise zone including Silvertown Quays, Royal Albert Dock and Royal Albert Basin. Current areas identified for redevelopment are:

- Bromley-by-Bow, led by Tesco, Tower Hamlets
- Canning Town and Custom House, Newham
- Chobham Manor, Newham
- East Village, the former Olympic village, Newham
- East Wick, Hackney
- Marshgate Wharf, Newham
- Pudding Mill, Newham
- Silvertown Quays, Newham
- Stratford City, led by Westfield, Newham
- Sugar House Island, led by Vastint, Newham
- Sweetwater, Tower Hamlets
- Bromley-by-Bow gasholders, led by St William

== In popular culture ==
The 2005 documentary What Have You Done Today, Mervyn Day? focuses on the history and landscape of the Lower Lea Valley. The film was made by Paul Kelly in conjunction with British pop group Saint Etienne.
