= Walthamstow Wetlands =

Urban nature reserve in Walthamstow, East London

- Site of Special Scientific Interest
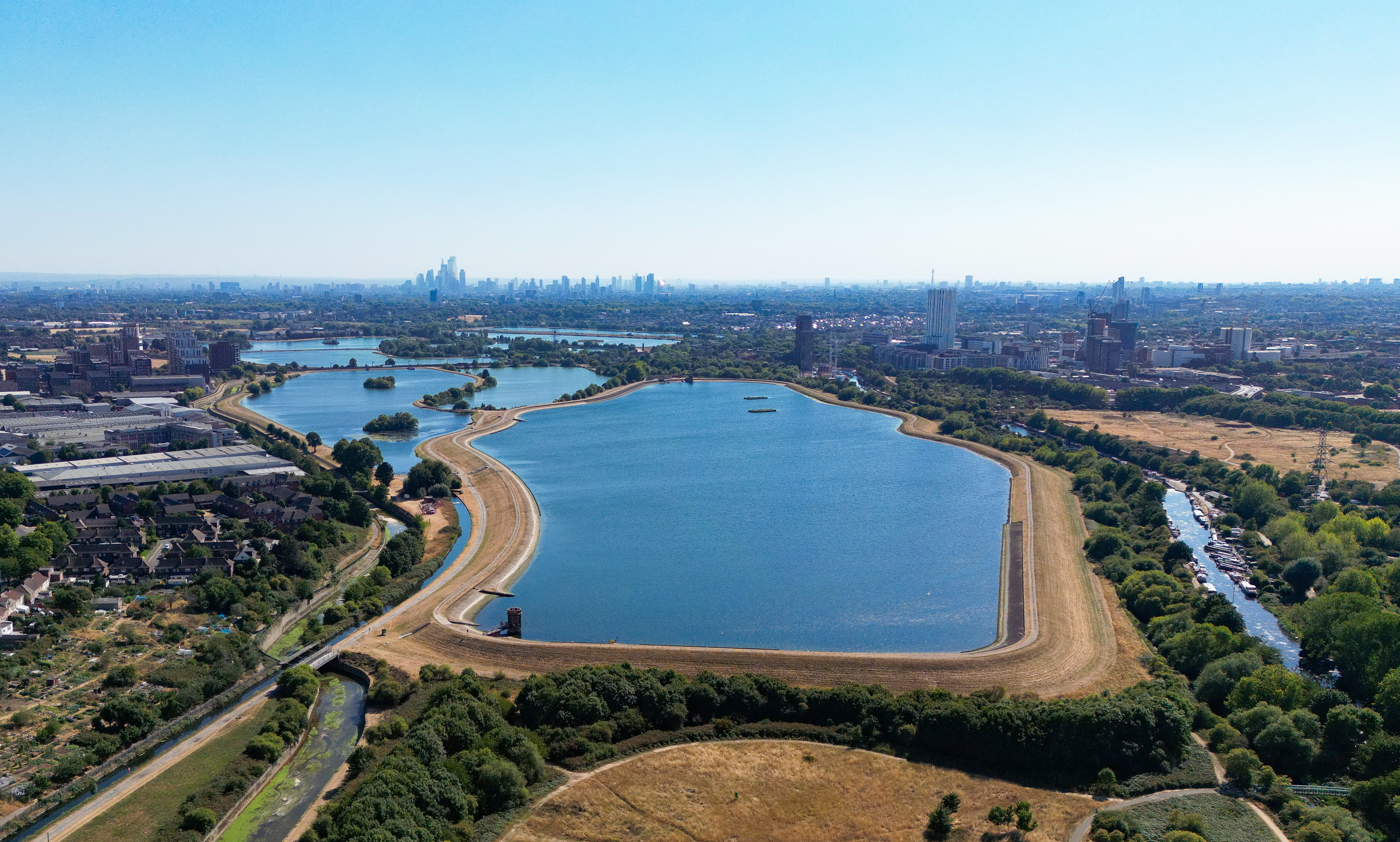
- Aerial view of Walthamstow reservoirs
- Location of Walthamstow Wetlands.
- Area of search: Greater London
- Grid reference: TQ350893
- Coordinates: 51.586350°N 0.052353°W
- Interest: Biological
- Area: 211 hectares (520 acres)
- Location map: Magic Map

Walthamstow Wetlands is a 211-hectare (520-acre; 2.11 km^{2}) nature reserve in Walthamstow, east London, adjacent to the River Lea in the London Borough of Waltham Forest. It is focused on the Walthamstow Reservoirs, built by the East London Waterworks Company between 1853 and 1904 as part of the Lee Valley Reservoir Chain. The site is one of the largest urban wetland nature reserves in Europe and is particularly important for wildlife due to its position within the Lee Valley. It serves as a byway for migrating, wintering and breeding birds. Visitors can freely access the site's natural, industrial and social heritage in one of the capital's most densely populated urban areas.

The reservoirs, under the ownership of Thames Water, also form part of a larger Site of Metropolitan Importance for Nature Conservation, noted for the mixture of aquatic and terrestrial habitats on site, and for their London-wide importance (especially for birds).

== Setting ==
The Wetlands, and the rest of the Lee Valley Reservoir Chain, are part of the Lee Valley Park, an area stretching from Ware in Hertfordshire (9 miles north of London) to the confluence of the Lea and Thames at Blackwall.

The part of the Lee Valley Park within London forms a green wedge, a mile wide at its broadest at the Walthamstow Wetlands, which extends south to include the Queen Elizabeth Olympic Park. South of Stratford the green wedge becomes little more than an accessible towpath along the Lea, which links a number of open spaces.

The nature reserve is a Site of Special Scientific Interest (SSSI) on account of the reservoirs' national and international importance to breeding, migratory and wintering waterbirds.It is part of a larger Site of Metropolitan Importance for Nature Conservation.

== History ==
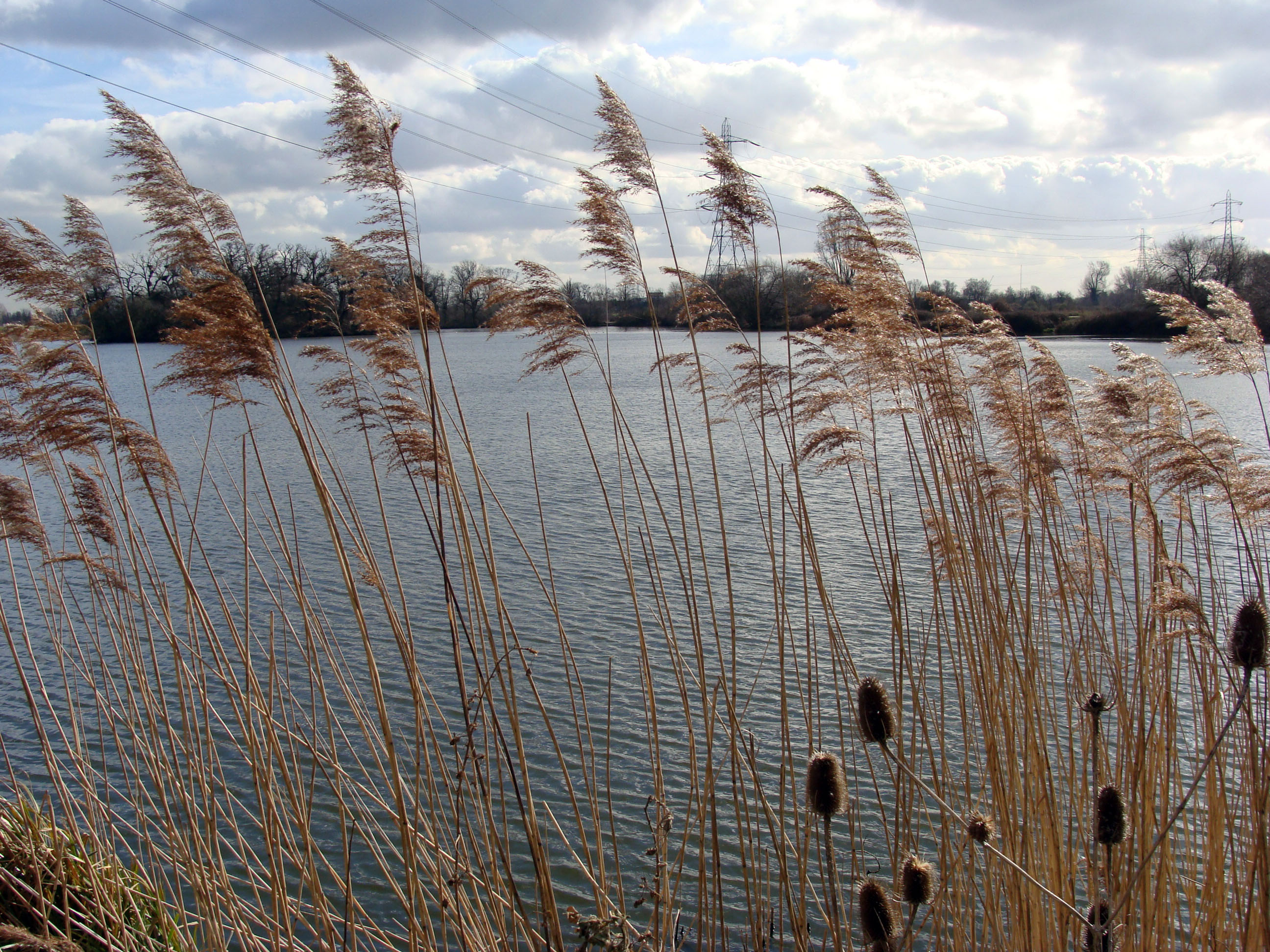
Walthamstow Reservoirs

In 1852, the East London Waterworks Company was granted permission to develop the Walthamstow reservoirs on marshland adjoining the River Lea, with construction taking place between 1863 and 1904, growing in scale and height as the needs of London grew. By 1863, the first stage of the reservoirs development was completed with the construction of Reservoir Nos. 1, 2 and 3. Collectively they occupied just under 18 hectares of land and were all laboriously hand-dug by teams of 'navvies'. In 1866, a drought in London and serious problems with water quality resulting in a cholera epidemic drove the second phase of construction—Reservoir Nos. 4 and 5 were now added. With London's fast-growing population, the High and Low Maynard Reservoirs were completed in 1870 for additional water storage whilst in 1887, a Davy compound engine (a new and powerful type of steam engine used widely for pumping at waterworks and mines during the late Victorian era) was installed at the Coppermill for use in the fast-expanding reservoirs system.

In 1894, the Engine House was built and remained in service until the 1980s—known initially as Ferry Lane Pumping Station, and later, the Marine Engine House, it was designed by East London Water Company’s architect H. Tooley under the watchful eye of Chief Engineer W. B. Bryan. Underneath the building was a network of underground reservoirs, chambers and pipes that linked the reservoirs and reached as far as Stoke Newington. In 1895, the East and West Warwick Reservoirs were completed and named after the Countess of Warwick, heiress of the local Maynard family, who sold the land to East London Waterworks Company.

In 1897, Lockwood Reservoir was the last reservoir to be created and also the largest—covering 30 hectares and excavated to a depth of around 8 metres. Named after one of the East London Water Company’s directors, it was a major engineering feat for its day—requiring a huge labour force of 1,250 men. Unlike the first reservoirs, which were dug mainly by hand, Lockwood was constructed with plenty of steam-powered pumps, engines and cranes—as well as a team of 50 horses.

The East London Waterworks Company was one of eight private water companies in London absorbed by the Metropolitan Water Board in 1904. In 1974, control was transferred to the Thames Water Authority, and then to Thames Water.

In 1940, Walthamstow was hit by the first of many German bombs during the Blitz in World War II. Several of the reservoirs were damaged during the Blitz, and the level of the Lockwood Reservoir was lowered in order to mitigate potential damage of its banks were breached by bombs.

In 1951, the Ferry Boat Inn and Coppermill were designated Grade II Listed Buildings for their architectural features and unique place in local history.

Historically the reservoirs were used purely as an operational site for London's water supply, but in recent decade the site has been recognised for its ecological, landscape and amenity value. A £10.6m scheme to renovate the site was carried out by the London Wildlife Trust, in partnership with Thames Water and Waltham Forest Council, and in October 2017 the site was opened to the public for the first time in 150 years as the Walthamstow Wetlands.

The Greater London Authority also funded the Wetlands to Wetlands Greenway, improving 3 km (1.9 mi) of cycle links between Woodberry Wetlands in Manor House and Walthamstow Wetlands to encourage visitors to visit both sites.

== Reservoirs ==
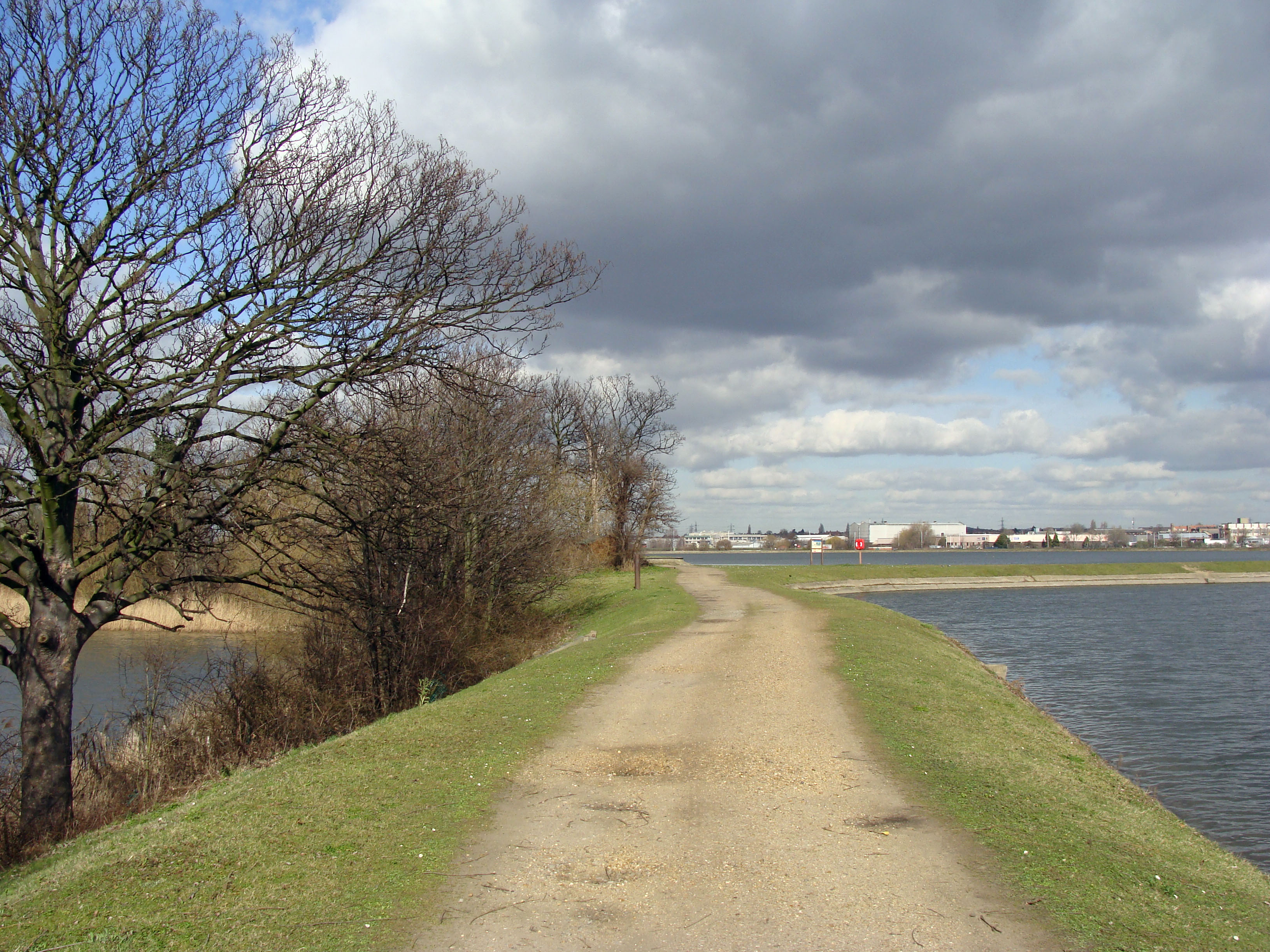
Path running between reservoirs 4 and 5

The Walthamstow Reservoirs complex is a mix of statutory (raised) reservoirs and non-statutory (in ground) reservoirs, owned and managed by Thames Water in order to supply drinking water to London.

The complex comprises ten water bodies:

- Lockwood Reservoir
- High Maynard Reservoir
- Low Maynard Reservoir
- East Warwick Reservoir
- West Warwick Reservoir
- Reservoirs 1, 2, 3, 4 and 5

== Architecture ==
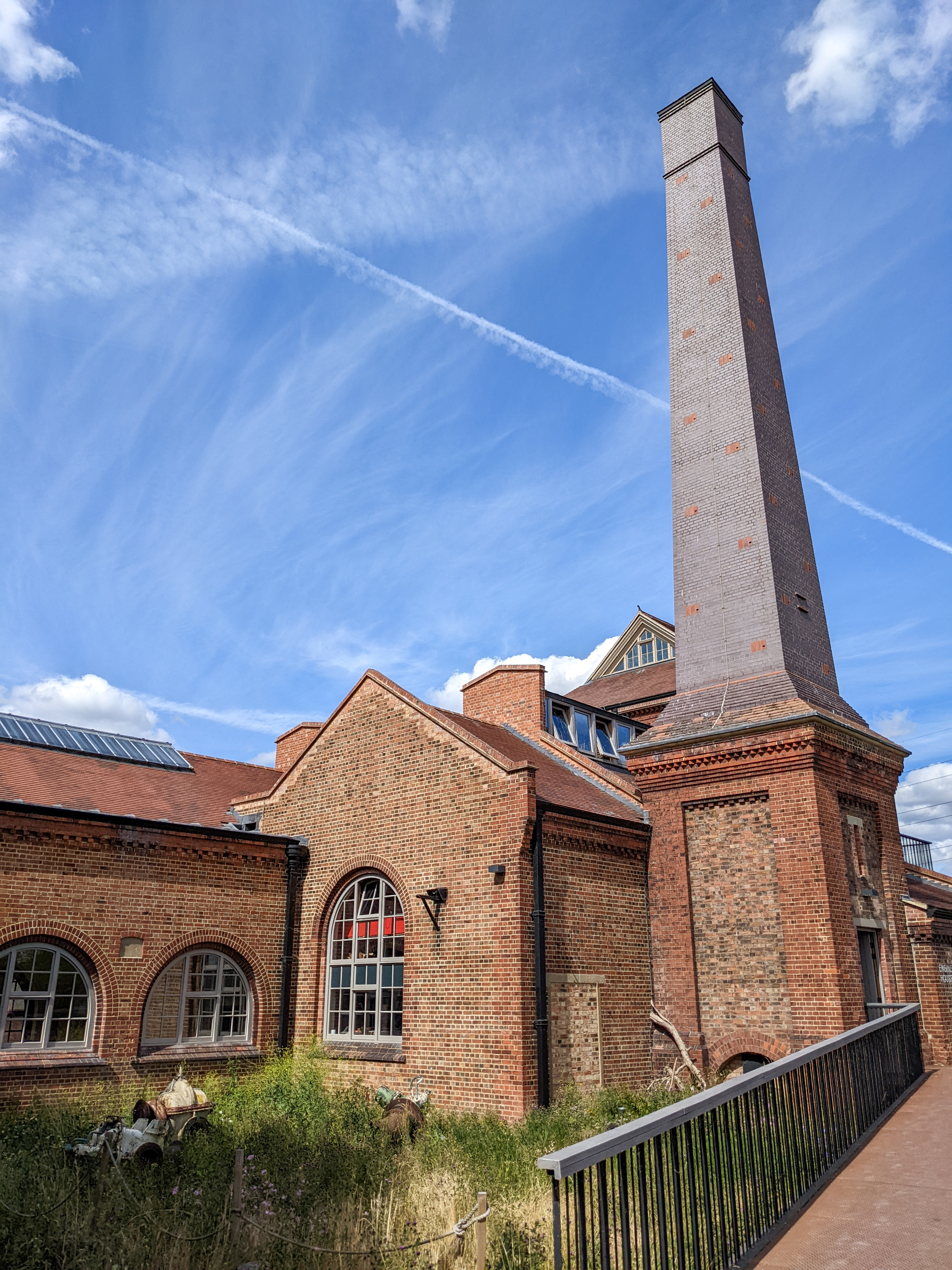
The Marine Engine House following renovation works and conversion into a cafe and visitor centre

There are two Victorian industrial structures on the site, including the Coppermill which gives its name to nearby Coppermill Lane, Coppermill Stream, and the Coppermills Water Treatment Works.

=== The Marine Engine House ===
Constructed in 1894, the Marine Engine House, previously named the Ferry Lane Pumping Station, was built during the development of the reservoir complex. The structure is relatively complex in form, but consists primarily of a two-storey building with a single storey building attached to its northern side. To the west of this is a further single storey building which includes, on its western side, the base of a now-demolished chimney stack. The Marine Engine House is constructed throughout in brick and architecturally is in the simplified Italianate style much used for Victorian industrial buildings, with semi-circular heads to all of the principal door and window openings.

Roofs are generally finished in plain clay tiles with extensive use of patent glazed roof-lights and ridge lights in the single storey sections. The roof of the Engine House is pitched at around 45 degrees, and is half-hipped at its northern and southern ends. Doors and window frames are in painted softwood. Despite the missing chimney, and some external alterations, the building is still an imposing piece of Victorian industrial architecture.

The Engine House is now a visitor centre with a café, shop, and exhibition space.

=== The Coppermill ===
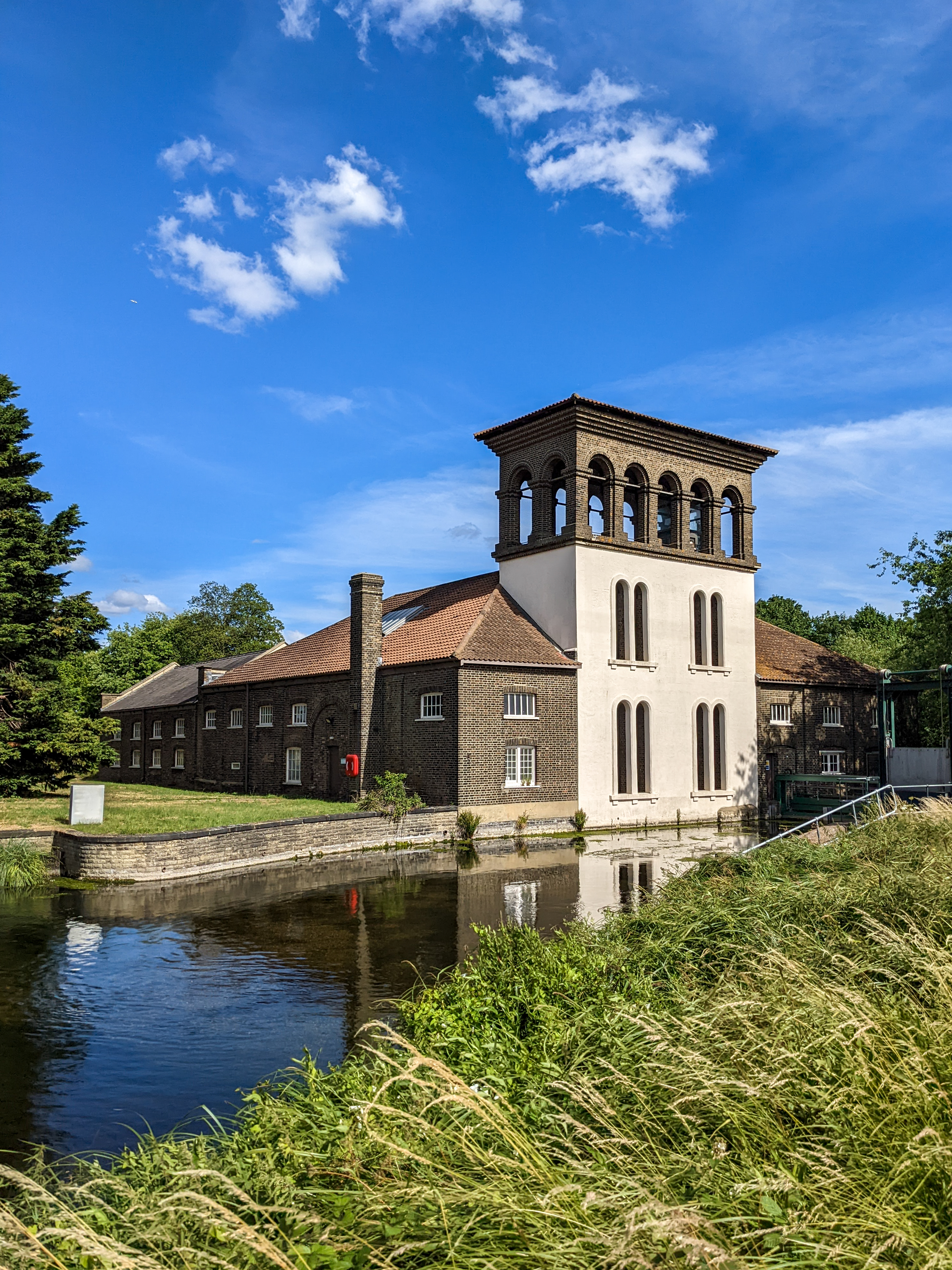
The Coppermill

The Coppermill building is Grade II Listed and has undergone a number of alterations over the centuries, including the addition of an Italianate tower in 1864. The mill at Walthamstow has been mentioned several times throughout historical records. It was noted that in the 14th century, the mill was powered by the Coppermill Stream that diverted from the River Lea for use in grinding corn. In 1611, four mills are mentioned in association with the Manor of Walthamstow.

From 1659 until 1703, the mill was known to have been used as a paper mill with the adjacent stream being referred to as the Paper-mill River. However, in 1699 the adjacent marshes are noted to have been referred to as Powder Mill Marsh which questions the use of the mill and suggests that it may have been used in the production of gunpowder for the English Civil War between 1642 and 1651. A number of gunpowder mills operated in the Lower Lee Valley, suggesting that the mill may have been used as such during this time.

Accounts from 1703, 1710, 1712 and 1718 record the mill being used as a leather mill, with Pierre Montier, a skin-dresser, first referred to as 'the Miller' in 1703 to be followed in turn by Peter Lefevre in 1711 and Daniel Lefevre in 1713.

The mill was described as an 'oyl mill' until 1806 when it was rebuilt and purchased by the British Copper Company in 1808. Smelted copper was brought to the mill from Landore, Swansea, Wales by barge via the Thames. The copper ingots were used to produce penny and halfpenny coins. Production of copper ceased in 1857, and in 1859 the mill was purchased by the East London Waterworks Company and modified to drive a water pump to assist in the building of the reservoirs.

At present, the Coppermill serves as an operational hub for Thames Water.

== Ecology ==
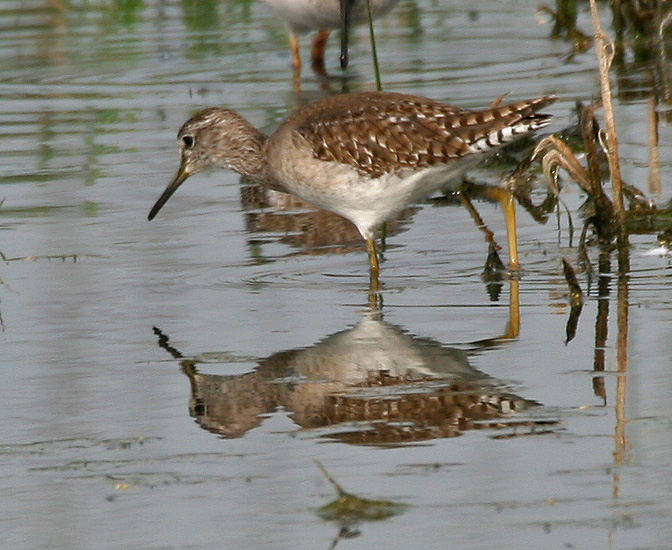
Wood Sandpiper

The Walthamstow Reservoirs support the most notable variety of breeding wetland birds among all of London's drinking water reservoirs.

Supporting a significant wintering population of pochard, shoveler and gadwall, Walthamstow Wetlands is regionally important to breeding populations of grey heron, tufted duck, little egret, cormorant and other waterfowl. Because of its location in the Lee Valley, Walthamstow Wetlands attracts a range of wading birds that stop off during their often long-distance journeys.

The wooded islands on No. 1 reservoir are the location of the famous heronry, at which the numbers of breeding pairs reach a level placing it in the country's top five sites. Formerly also a heronry, the two islands in No. 5 reservoir are now home to large numbers of cormorants. Great crested grebe, pochard, tufted duck, coot, yellow wagtail, sedge warbler and reed warbler are all regular breeding visitors, whilst other regular visitors to the reservoirs include green sandpiper, common sandpiper, dunlin, redshank and lapwing, while less common species include ringed plover, little ringed plover, curlew, ruff, common snipe, Eurasian oystercatcher, wood sandpiper, whimbrel, European golden plover and little stint.

Zebra mussels, native to southern Russia and Ukraine, have become naturalised in the reservoirs and present an ongoing challenge to the water companies, as over time, their colonies can build up and cause blockages to the pipes leading from the reservoirs.

Nearly 300 species of plant have been recorded in the wooded areas, grass banks, fen and open water habitats of the reservoirs.

== Recreation ==
The ten reservoirs, grounds and the Coppermill Stream form an extensive enclave of natural habitats, albeit within a man made and securely fenced infrastructure. They are visited by birdwatchers and naturalists but especially by anglers. All the reservoirs are variously stocked with fish, providing both coarse fishing and fly fishing. Carp over 40 pounds have been recorded, and rainbow trout up to 5 pounds. An inexpensive day permit is required to fish at the site.

== See also ==
- London water supply infrastructure
- List of Sites of Special Scientific Interest in London
- Walthamstow Marshes
- Hackney Marshes
