= Lee Valley Reservoir Chain =

Chain of 13 reservoirs supplying London

Coordinates: 51°35′N 0°3′W

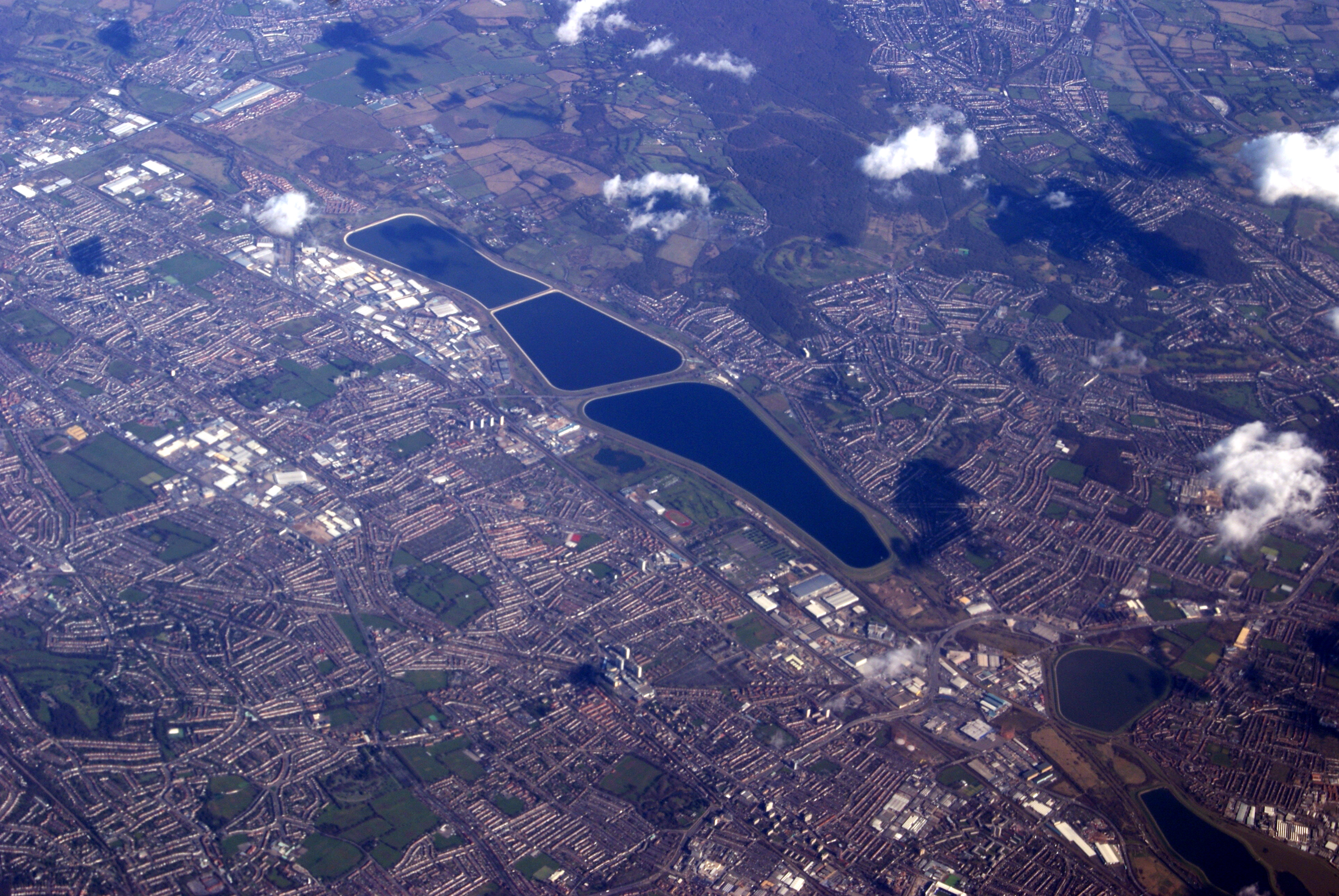
Aerial view of several of the Lee Valley reservoirs

The Lee Valley Reservoir Chain is located in the Lee Valley, and comprises 13 reservoirs that supply drinking water to London.

The Reservoir Chain, together with the flood plain which it occupies, is a major geographic constraint; together with the Thames it is one of the two significant topographic features that divide the capital and define the communities on either side. The Lower Lea Valley, downstream of the reservoirs, is more integrated, with better east–west transport connectivity.

== Geographic significance ==
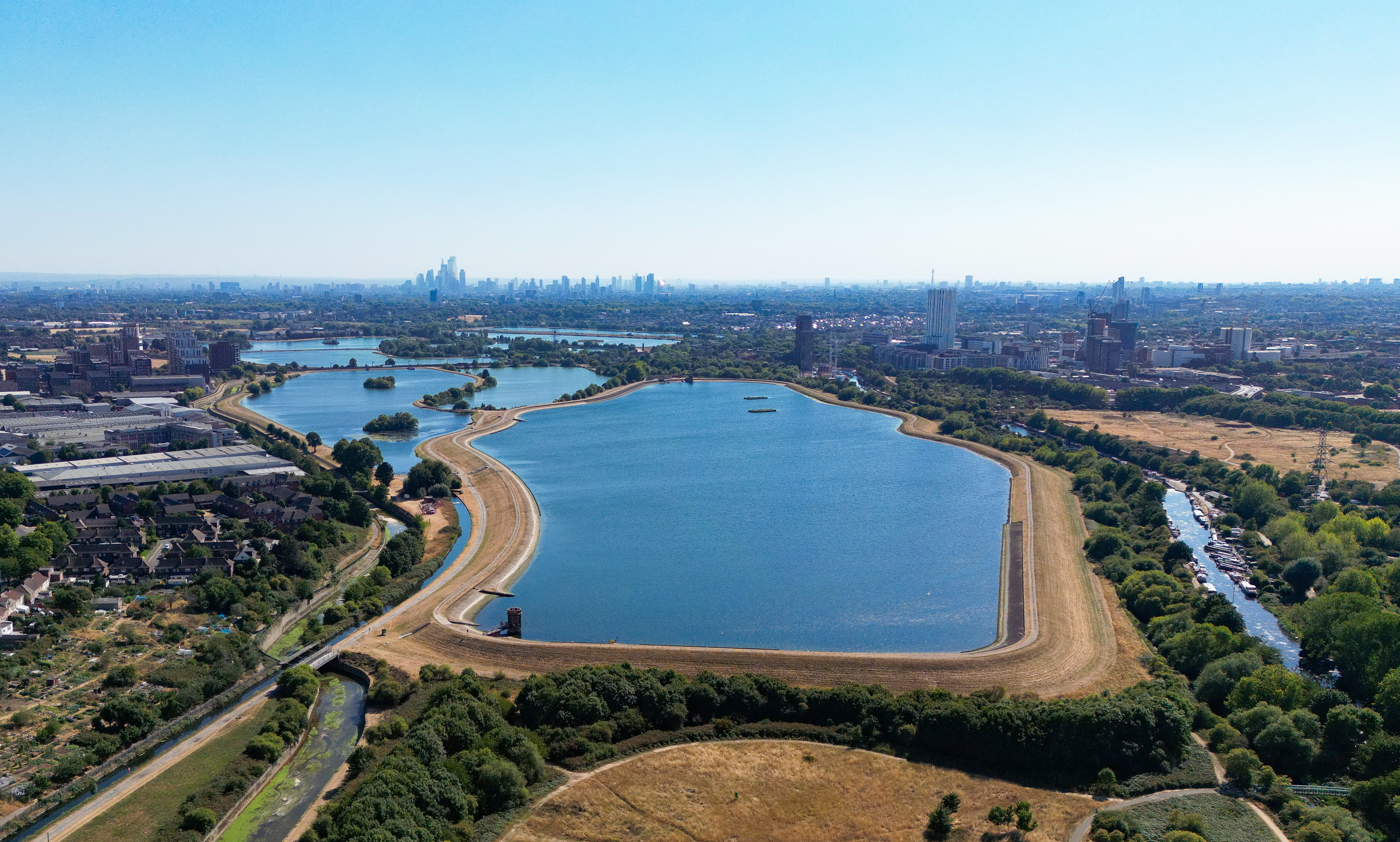
The southern reservoirs, viewed from the north

The Chain separates the London Boroughs of Haringey and Enfield to the west, from Waltham Forest and Essex in the east. The corridor includes 13 reservoirs and two to three channels of the Lee, as well as marshes and parkland, up to a mile wide.

During World War I, the settlements on both sides of the Lea were badly hit by German Army and Navy airship raids. It is believed the crews mistook the Reservoir Chain for the Thames and released their bombs on what they took to be central London.

The Boundary Commission treats the Thames and Lea as natural barriers within London. When reviewing the boundaries of London's parliamentary constituencies, it concludes that any constituency spanning either river would be artificial and not reflect local communities or identities. The 2018 review compromised on this, allowing a cross-Lea constituency further south, in the Lower Lea where the communities on each side are more integrated due to the greater quantity and quality of the road and rail links across the valley.

The corridor is part of the Metropolitan Green Belt, and its national and international significance for wildlife is reflected by SSSI, Ramsar and SPA designations. Lying between some of London's most densely populated areas, the Reservoir Chain and associated open land provide a highly valued ecological, landscape and recreational resource for the people of north and east London.

== Reservoirs ==
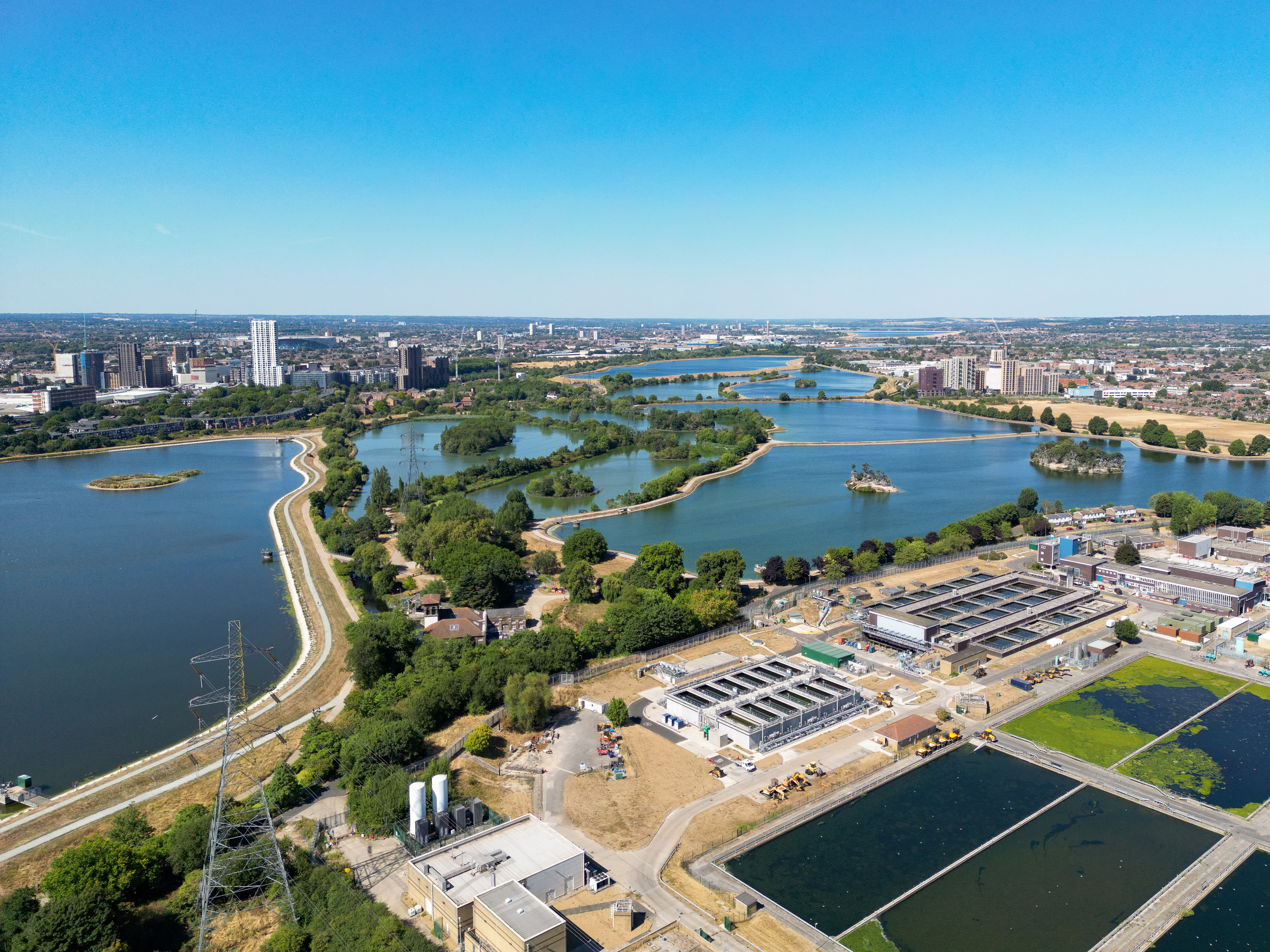
Aerial View of Walthamstow Reservoirs

Lee valley reservoirs (in downstream order)
Reservoir	Water source (see below)	Water supply	Depth (metres)	Capacity (megalitres)
Chingford Reservoirs (London Borough of Enfield)
King George V	River Lea, New River, Lea Diversion	Pumped	7.5	12,500
William Girling	Lea Diversion	Pumped	12.5	16,500
Walthamstow Reservoirs (London Borough of Waltham Forest)
Banbury	Lea Diversion & Thames-Lee tunnel	Pumped	8.5	2,950
Lockwood	Lea Diversion & Thames-Lee tunnel	Pumped	10.4	2,500
High Maynard	Lee Diversion, Walthamstow No. 4, East Warwick	Gravity-fed	5.8	680
Low Maynard	High Maynard	Gravity-fed	3.0	150
Walthamstow No. 4	High Maynard, Walthamstow No. 5	Gravity-fed	5.8	590
Walthamstow No. 5	Walthamstow No. 4	Gravity-fed	5.8	770
East Warwick	High Maynard, West Warwick	Gravity-fed	5.8	960
West Warwick	East Warwick	Gravity-fed	5.8	800

The Chingford Reservoirs are a Site of Special Scientific Interest (SSSI). The Walthamstow Reservoirs, with the exception of Banbury Reservoir, also form an SSSI.

== Water supply ==
The reservoirs are fed by the following waters:

- River Lee Diversion
- River Lee Flood Relief Channel
- New River
- The Thames-Lee Water Main

== Water treatment ==
After being stored in the above reservoirs the water is piped to the Coppermills Water Treatment Works to be treated. In 2006 a smaller water treatment works was also built at Chingford at the edge of the William Girling and King George V reservoirs.

== See also ==
- London water supply infrastructure
- Bomb Crater Pond (Walthamstow)
