= Thames Water Ring Main =

London water supply infrastructure

Coordinates: 51°24.75′N 0°27′W

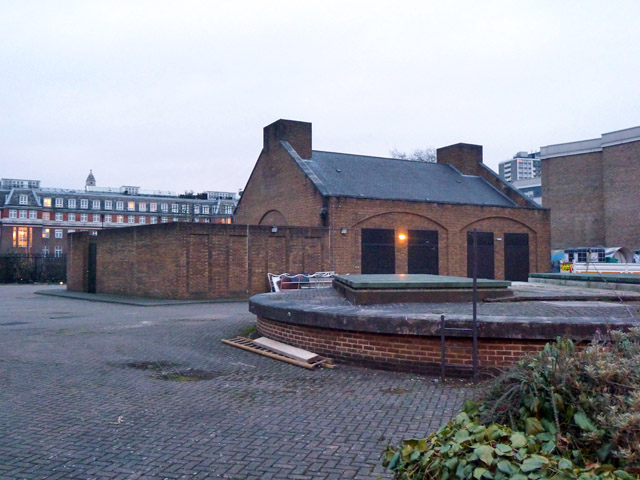
- Ring Main shaft and pump house at New River Head

Overview
- Type: Urban water infrastructure
- Status: Operational
- Locale: Greater London
- Construction Period: 1988 - 1993, 2007 - 2010
- Website: http://www.thameswater.co.uk
- Owner: Thames Water

Technical
- Tunnel length: 80 km (50 mi)
- Capacity: 1.8 Gl/d (gigalitre / day)
- Depth: 10–65 m (33–213 ft)
- Tunnel diameter: 2.54–2.91 m (8.3–9.5 ft)
- Cost of construction: £248m (initial construction)

The Thames Water Ring Main (TWRM, formerly the London Water Ring Main) is a system of approximately 80 km (50 mi) of concrete tunnels which transfer drinking water from water treatment works in the Thames and River Lea catchments for distribution within central London.

A major part of London's water supply infrastructure, the initial ring was constructed by Thames Water between 1988 and 1993 at a cost of £248 million (equivalent to £534 million in 2025), and when completed, it was the longest tunnel in the UK. Two extensions were constructed between 2007 and 2010.

== Overview ==
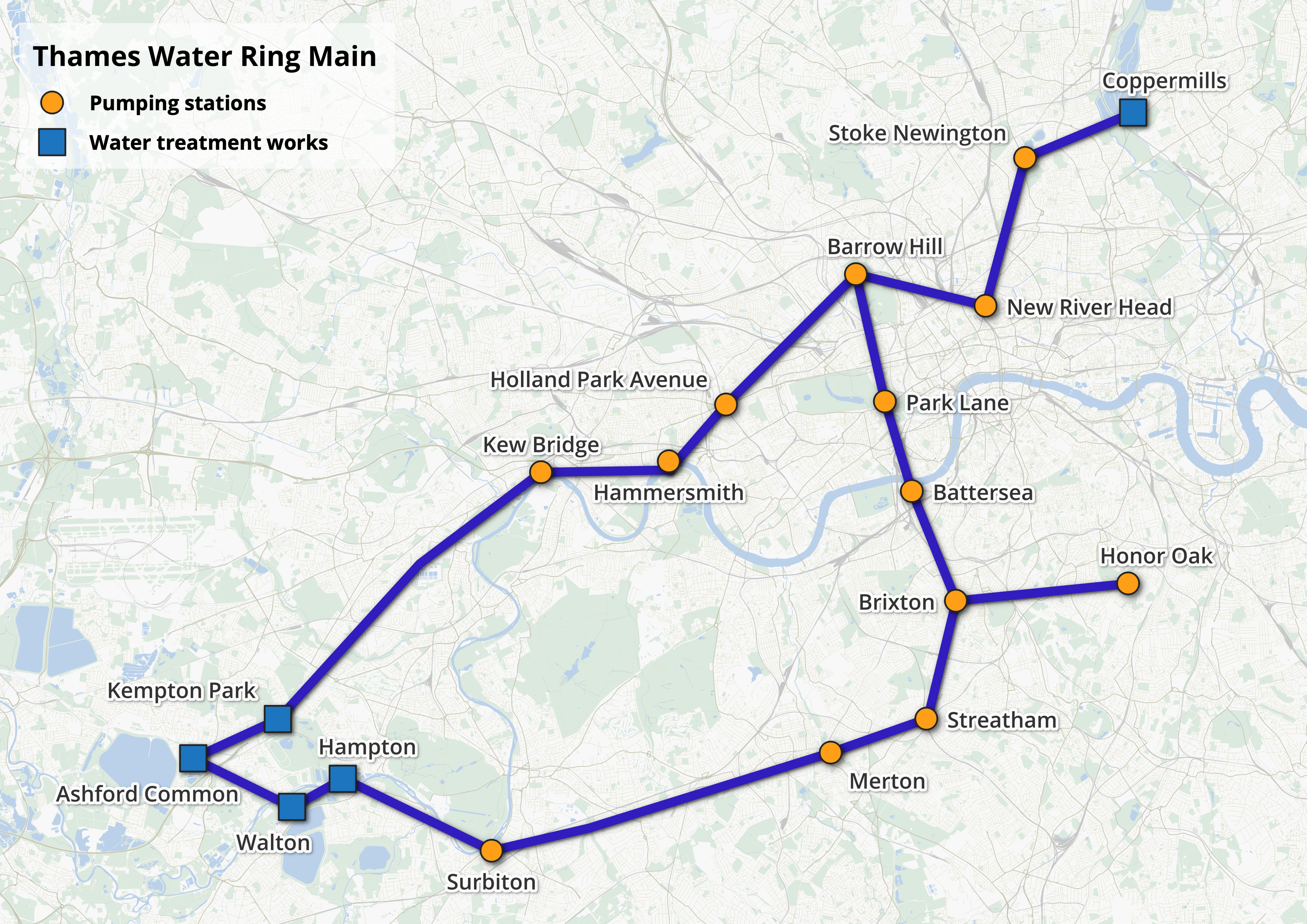
Map of the Thames Water Ring Main

The ring main comprises a major loop linking the Hampton, Walton, Ashford and Kempton water treatment works clustered in west London, to central London by a southern branch via Brixton and northern branch via Kew. Spurs run to Coppermills Water Treatment Works near Walthamstow, and to the reservoir and pumping station at Honor Oak. The total transfer capacity of the system is 1.8 billion litres per day.

The ring main is located well below most water mains, at a depth of 10 to 65 m (33 to 213 ft) below ground level and approximately 10 to 30 m (33 to 98 ft) below sea level. The tunnel is mostly of 2.54 m (100 in) internal diameter, except for the section between Ashford Common and Kew, where it is 2.91 m (115 in). It is connected to the surface by 21 vertical shafts that extend to ground level.

== Rationale ==
Before the ring main was built, water was transferred within London through a number of trunk mains, mostly located just below the surface. Some of the oldest operational pressure mains in the world — the oldest dating from 1838 — the trunks were weakened by corrosion. Additionally, there was an increased pressure requirement due to increasing water demand, as well as an increase in external stresses due to vehicle traffic. These problems were exacerbated by a lack of system redundancies which limited preventive maintenance, resulting in an increasing number of leaks. The ring main extended the operational life of the high-level trunks by reducing the demand placed on them, and, by providing an increased level of redundancy, enabled them to be more easily isolated and maintained.

== Construction ==
The main was constructed in two phases: the southern leg in 1988 to 1991, and the northern leg in 1991 to 1993. A tunnel was also built between Coppermills Water Treatment Works and Stoke Newington at the same time, although this was not connected to the rest of the ring until the later extension phase. The project was geographically split into stages, separately contracted and constructed largely simultaneously. Different contractors' work resulted in minor variations in tunnel details. The tunnels were constructed using tunnel boring machines, with interlocking wedgelock linings.

The southern leg of the project refurbished and reused the existing Southern Tunnel Main, completed in 1974 between Ashford Common and Merton, but otherwise the project consisted of brand new tunnels.

Eleven new pumping stations were constructed as part of the project, to extract water from the tunnel and send it to the water distribution network. These were positioned to deliver water to the areas of London with the greatest demand, which often meant they had to be constructed in locations where space was at a premium. In three locations — Barrow Hill, Holland Park Avenue, and Park Lane — the pumping stations were constructed entirely underground.

Once the ring main was completed, it was envisaged that four existing water treatment works at Barn Elms, Stoke Newington, Surbiton, and Hornsey would be decommissioned, although Hornsey ultimately remained open.

=== Geology ===
The main lies mostly within London Clay with sections within the overlying alluvium and underlying Lambeth Group and Thanet Sand. The predominance of the London Clay lengths is by design, as being easily excavated, largely impermeable and somewhat self-supporting for short periods it is a near-ideal tunnelling material. Where the design required entry into the Lambeth Group and Thanet Sand, tunnelling was considerably more difficult. In particular, the Thanet Sand requires a high boring torque, is highly abrasive and, most challengingly, sufficiently permeable to contain a water table continuous with the underlying Chalk and measured at pressures up to 4 bar (400 kPa). An unexpected entry into the Thanet Sand while excavating near Tooting Bec Common led to the flooding of the tunnel and the temporary abandonment of a tunnel boring machine. A further problem with Thanet Sand was the presence of glauconite, which oxidises on contact with air. The resulting de-oxygenated air resulted in two fatalities during the excavation of a pump-out shaft.

== Extension ==
Between 2007 and 2010, two extensions to the ring main were constructed. A 4.5 km (2.8 mi) tunnel was built between New River Head and Stoke Newington, connecting the ring main to the tunnel to Coppermills water treatment works, which was built in the initial construction phase. A 5 km (3.1 mi) tunnel was also constructed between Brixton and Honor Oak. These extensions increased the ring main's transfer capacity by 500 million litres per day.

== Hydraulics ==
Flow through the main is by gravity under the driving head of the service reservoirs. By virtue of its depth, the pipeline is under some pressure. The hydraulic grade line rarely exceeds ground level. To enter, supply water is pumped up into the distribution zones at the pump-out shafts. In some respects, the main can be considered as a reservoir, from which supply is drawn as required. An indication of this dynamic variation in demand is that the minimum hydraulic level moves between the Battersea and Park Lane pump-out shafts. The loop is closed to provide the redundancy that allows any segment on the ring to be isolated and drained for maintenance without interrupting the supply to any shaft, not for hydraulic reasons.

== Shafts ==
The 21 shafts connecting the main to the surface are divided into:

- 5 water treatment works (WTW), which supply clean water,
- 11 pumping stations (PS), which withdraw water from the main,
- 3 access shafts, where no water transfer occurs, and
- 2 storage locations, where water is supplied or withdrawn as demand fluctuates.

=== North leg ===
- Ashford Common — WTW
- Kempton Park — WTW
- Mogden, Isleworth — Access
- Kew — PS
- Barnes — balancing storage
- Holland Park Avenue — PS
- Barrow Hill, Primrose Hill — PS

=== South leg ===
- Ashford Common — WTW
- Walton — WTW
- Hampton — WTW
- Surbiton — PS
- Hogsmill — Access
- Raynes Park — Access
- Merton — PS
- Streatham — PS
- Brixton — PS
- Battersea — PS
- Park Lane — PS
- Barrow Hill — PS

=== North extension ===
- Barrow Hill — PS
- New River Head — PS
- Stoke Newington — PS
- Coppermills — WTW

=== South extension ===
- Brixton — PS
- Honor Oak — underground storage
