= Bomb Crater Pond (Walthamstow) =

Pond in London

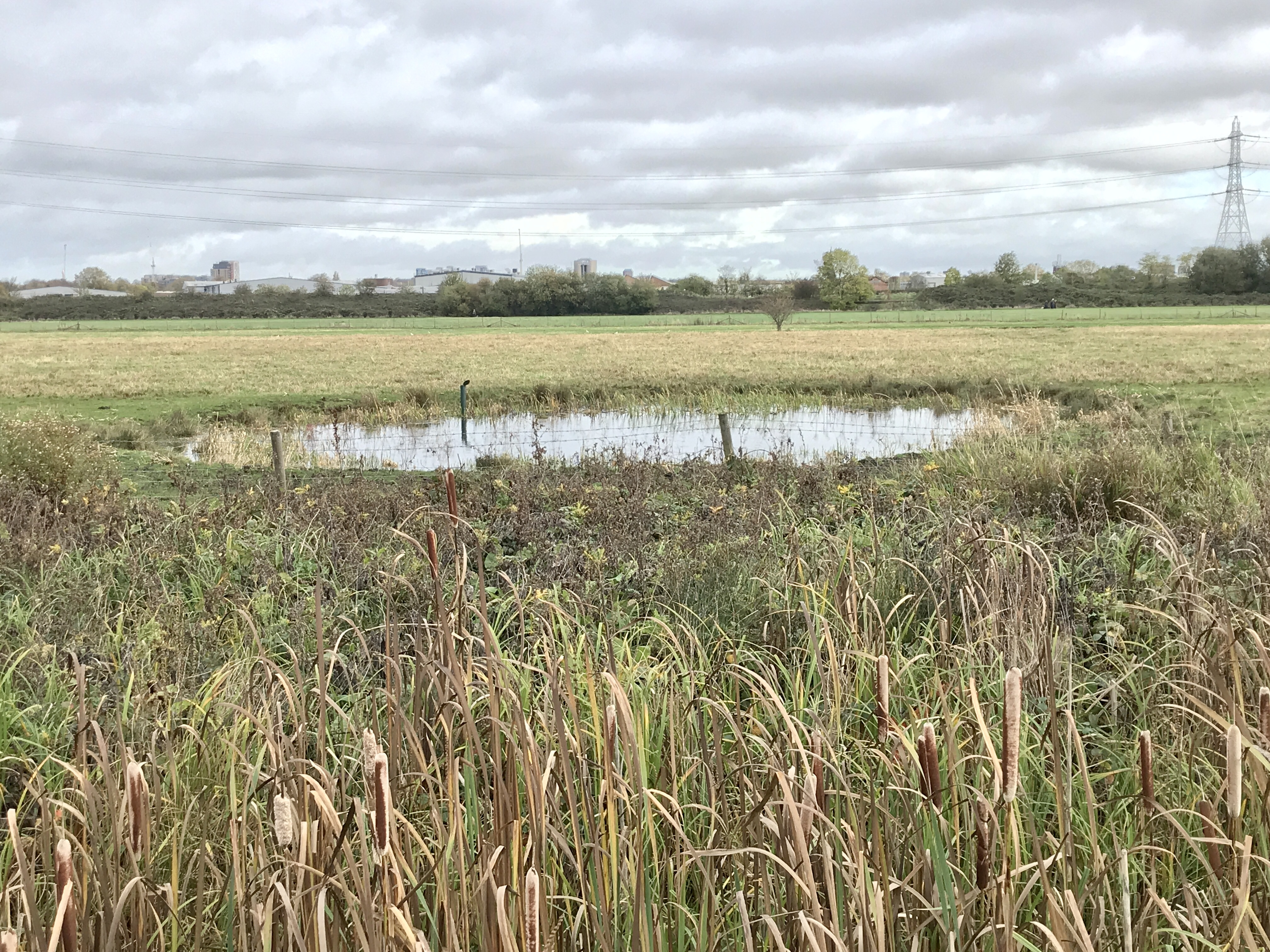
- Bomb Crater Pond, from the South West footpath by the River Lea.

- Location within England
- Location: Walthamstow, London
- Coordinates: 51.566948°N 0.048746°W
- Type: pond

Bomb Crater Pond is a pond in the Walthamstow Marshes in the London Borough of Waltham Forest, England. It formed in the crater left by the explosion of a German V-2 rocket on 11 February 1945, during World War II.

== History ==
In February 1945, near the end of World War II, the German 485th Artillery Regiment of the Wehrmacht was renamed 902nd Artillery Regiment and relocated to Holland. The regiment's special purpose (German "z.b.V." i.e. "zur besonderen Verwendung") was to launch V-2 rockets. On 11 February 1945, its 3rd Artillery Battery launched one of its many attacks against London. The V2 rocket, however, did not hit its target and ended up in the Walthamstow Marshes instead. Nobody was killed, but one person was injured, and the nearby Latham Timber Yard was covered in thick mud.

The crater was left untouched. Over the following years, it gradually filled up with water. Today, it can be seen in a cattle enclosure by the footpath following the River Lea on the south-west corner of the Walthamstow Marshes.
