= West Warwick Reservoir =

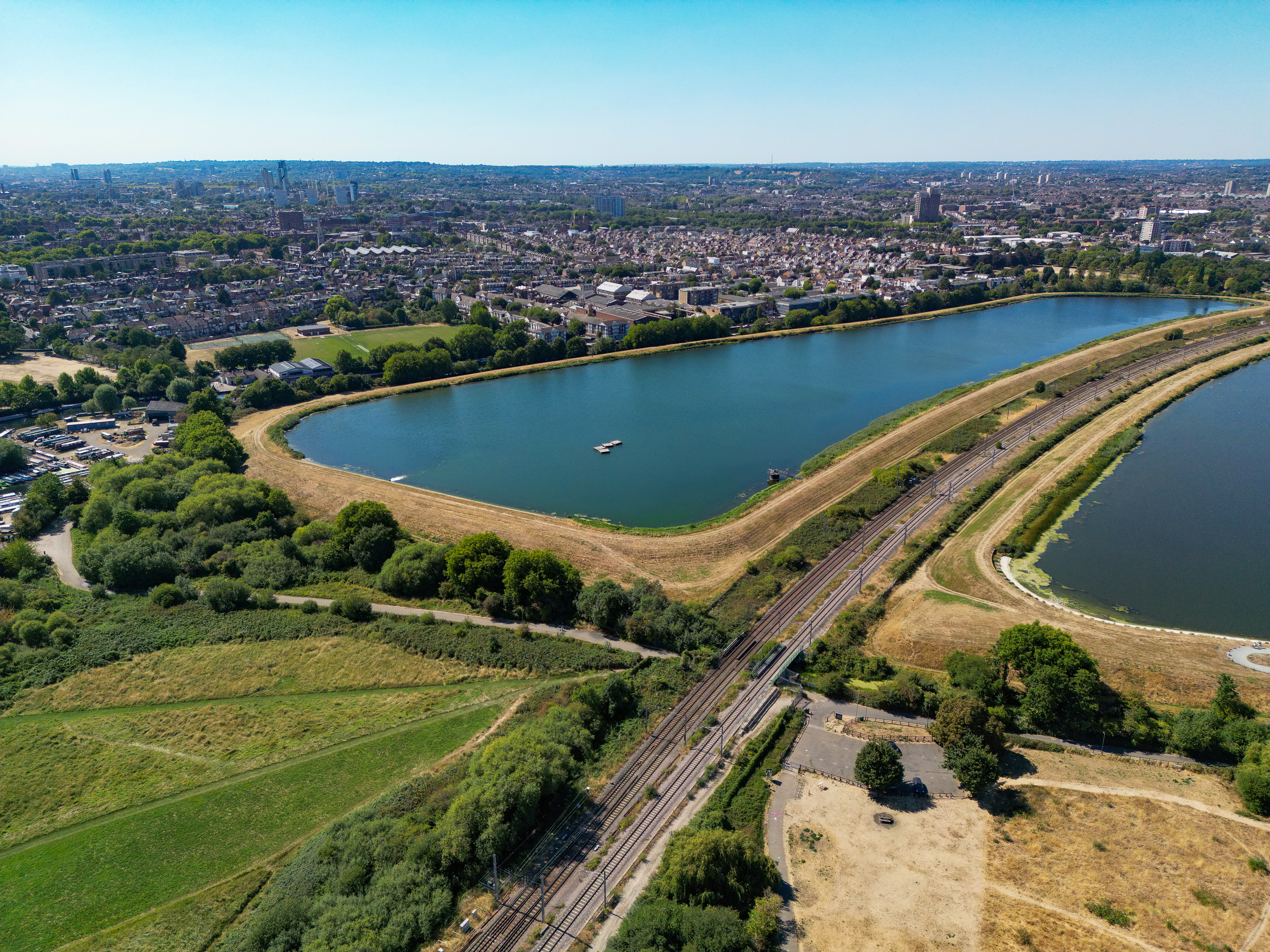

- Location within London Borough of Waltham Forest
- Location: London Borough of Waltham Forest
- Coordinates: 51.576456°N 0.058494°W
- Type: reservoir
- Basin countries: United Kingdom
- Max. depth: 5.8 m (19 ft)
- Water volume: 0.8 Gl (0.18×10^{9} imp gal)

West Warwick Reservoir is located in the London Borough of Waltham Forest at Walthamstow. The storage reservoir is part of the Lee Valley Reservoir Chain, which supplies drinking water to London. It is owned by Thames Water.

== History ==
In 1895, the East and West Warwick Reservoirs were completed and named after the Countess of Warwick, heiress of the local Maynard family, who sold the land to East London Waterworks Company which constructed a series of reservoirs in the mid-19th century on former marshland.

== Ecology ==
The reservoir is part of Walthamstow Reservoirs, which is a Site of Special Scientific Interest (SSSI).

== Recreation ==
The reservoir is popular with birdwatchers, anglers and naturalists, but access is by permit only.

== See also ==
- London water supply infrastructure
