= High Maynard Reservoir =

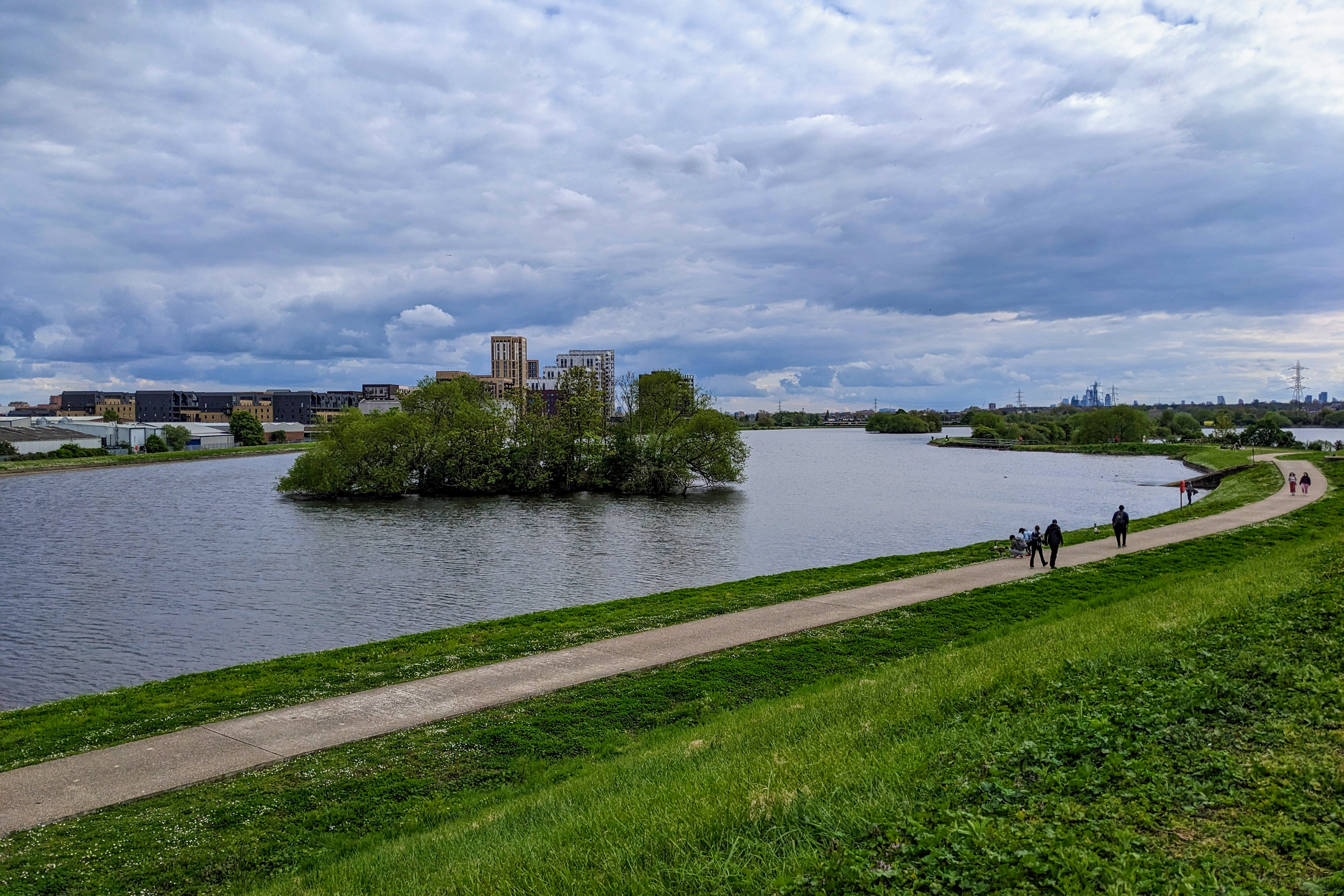

- Location within London Borough of Waltham Forest
- Location: London Borough of Waltham Forest
- Coordinates: 51.5889°N 0.0466°W
- Type: reservoir
- Basin countries: United Kingdom
- Max. depth: 5.8 m (19 ft)
- Water volume: 0.68 Gl (0.15×10^{9} imp gal; 550 acre⋅ft)

High Maynard Reservoir is located in Walthamstow in the London Borough of Waltham Forest. The storage reservoir is one of the Lee Valley Reservoir Chain and supplies drinking water to London.

== History ==
In 1852, the East London Waterworks Company was granted permission to develop land at Walthamstow for reservoirs and by 1863, the first stage of the reservoirs development was completed with the construction of Reservoir Nos. 1, 2 and 3. Construction of the High Maynard reservoir was completed in 1870 by the East London Waterworks Company on former marshland and is now owned and managed by Thames Water.

== Ecology ==
The water is a Site of Special Scientific Interest (SSSI). In winter, cormorants roost on the island with their numbers reaching nationally important levels. The fringes of the reservoir contain many plant species that are uncommon to Greater London.

== Recreation ==
The water is open to the public and is popular with birdwatchers, walkers and anglers.

== See also ==
- London water supply infrastructure
