= Low Maynard Reservoir =

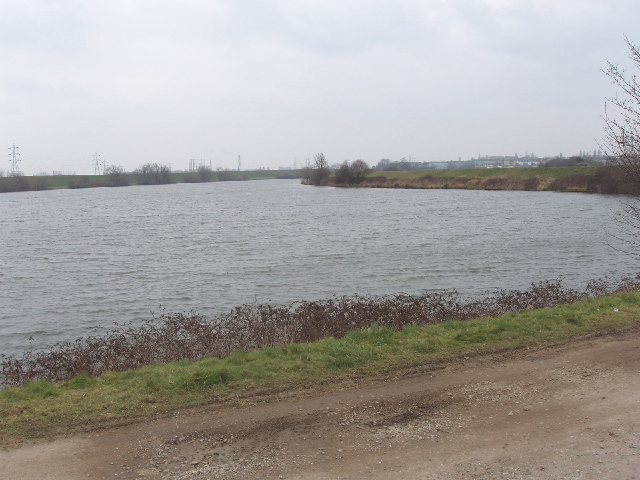
- Looking north from Ferry Lane

- Location within London Borough of Waltham Forest
- Location: London Borough of Waltham Forest
- Coordinates: 51.58848°N 0.049782°W
- Type: reservoir
- Basin countries: United Kingdom
- Max. depth: 3.0 m (9.8 ft)
- Water volume: 0.15 Gl (0.033×10^{9} imp gal)

Low Maynard Reservoir is located in Walthamstow in the London Borough of Waltham Forest. The storage reservoir is part of the Lee Valley Reservoir Chain and supplies drinking water to London.

== History ==
Construction of the reservoir was completed in 1870 by the East London Waterworks Company on former marshland. It is now owned and managed by Thames Water.

== Ecology ==
The reservoir is part of the Walthamstow Reservoirs Site of Special Scientific Interest, and it supports a large concentration of breeding wildfowl.

The fringes of the reservoir contain species of plants uncommon in Greater London, including:

- Caltha palustris Marsh-marigold
- Schoenaoplectus lacustris Common Club-rush
- Typha angustifolia Lesser bulrush
- Carex x subgracilis The 'graceful' sedge

== Recreation ==
Access to the water, which is by permit only, is popular with birdwatchers, walkers and anglers.

== See also ==
- London water supply infrastructure
