= East Warwick Reservoir =

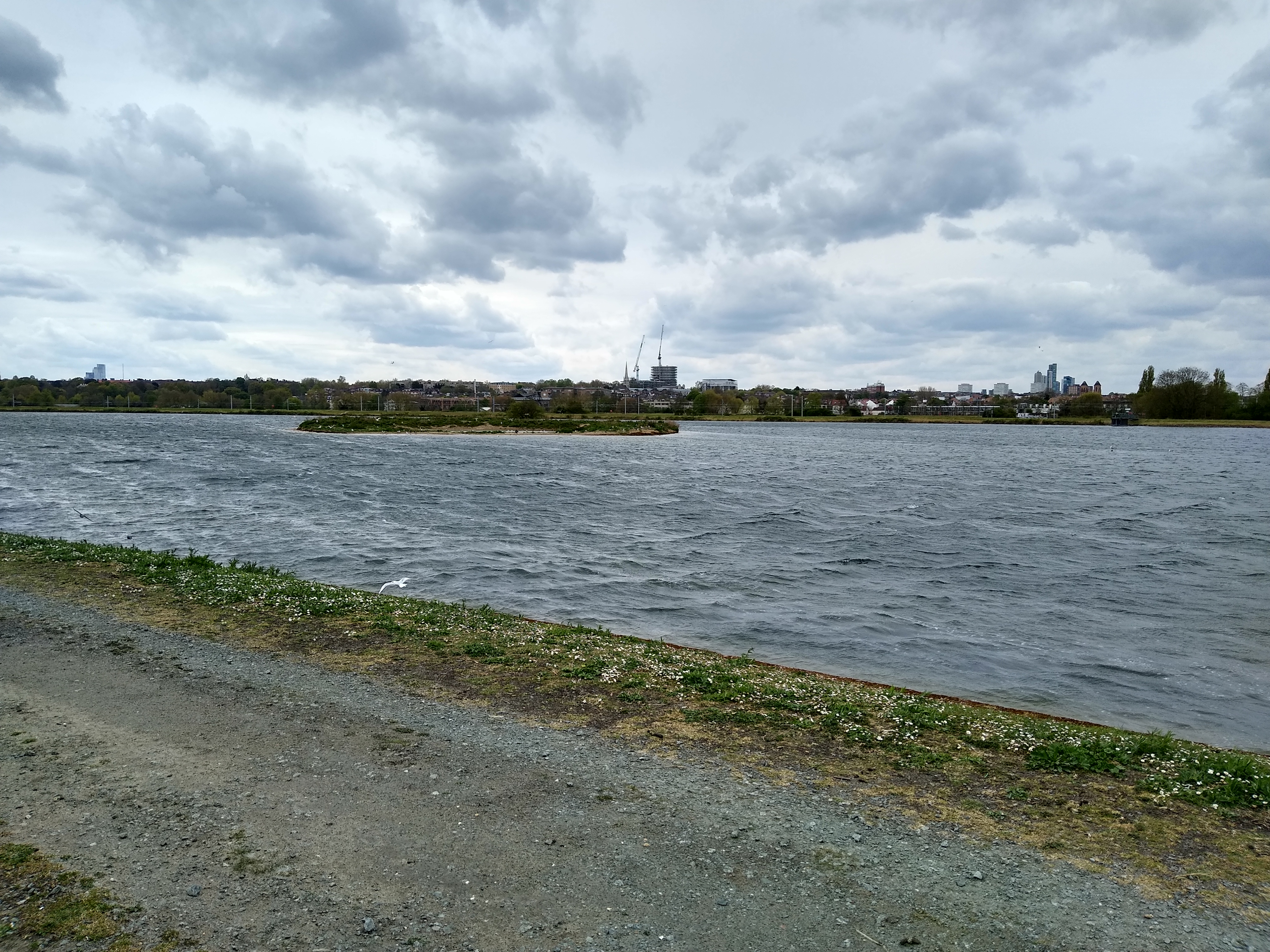

- Location within Greater London
- Location: London Borough of Waltham Forest
- Coordinates: 51.580457°N 0.056176°W
- Type: reservoir
- Basin countries: United Kingdom
- Max. depth: 5.8 m (19 ft)
- Water volume: 0.96 Gl (0.21×10^{9} imp gal)

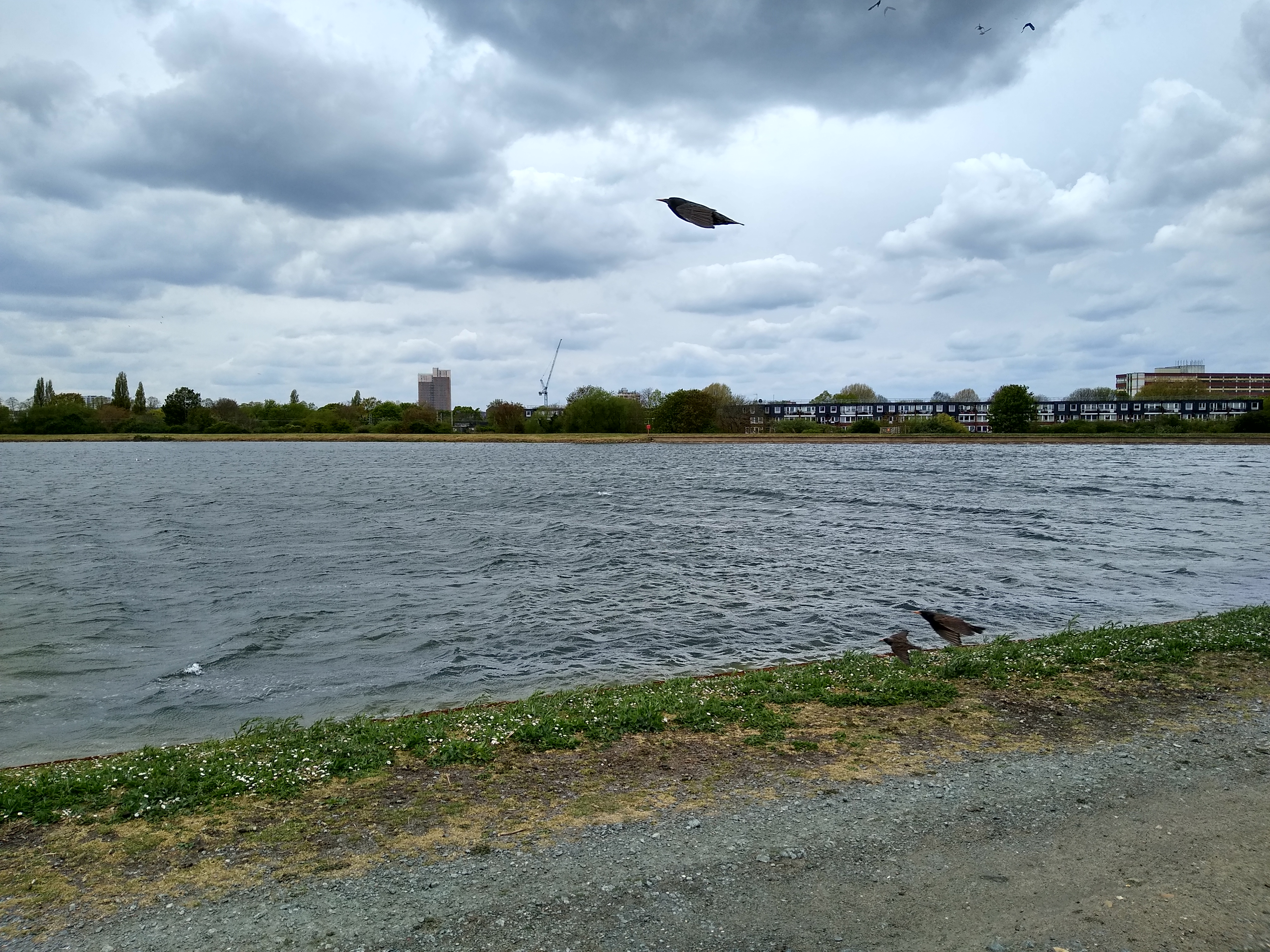
East Warwick Reservoir

East Warwick Reservoir is located in the London Borough of Waltham Forest at Walthamstow. The storage reservoir is part of the Lee Valley Reservoir Chain and supplies drinking water to London. The reservoir is owned by Thames Water.

== History ==
The reservoir was constructed on marshland in the mid–19th century by the East London Waterworks Company. ^{(Source?)}

== Ecology ==
The reservoir is part of the Walthamstow Reservoirs Site of Special Scientific Interest. It is particularly favoured by the tufted duck.

== Recreation ==
The reservoir is popular with birdwatchers, naturalists and anglers, but access is by permit only.

The water also functions as a trout fishery.

== See also ==
- London water supply infrastructure
