= Lockwood Reservoir =

Water storage reservoir in East London

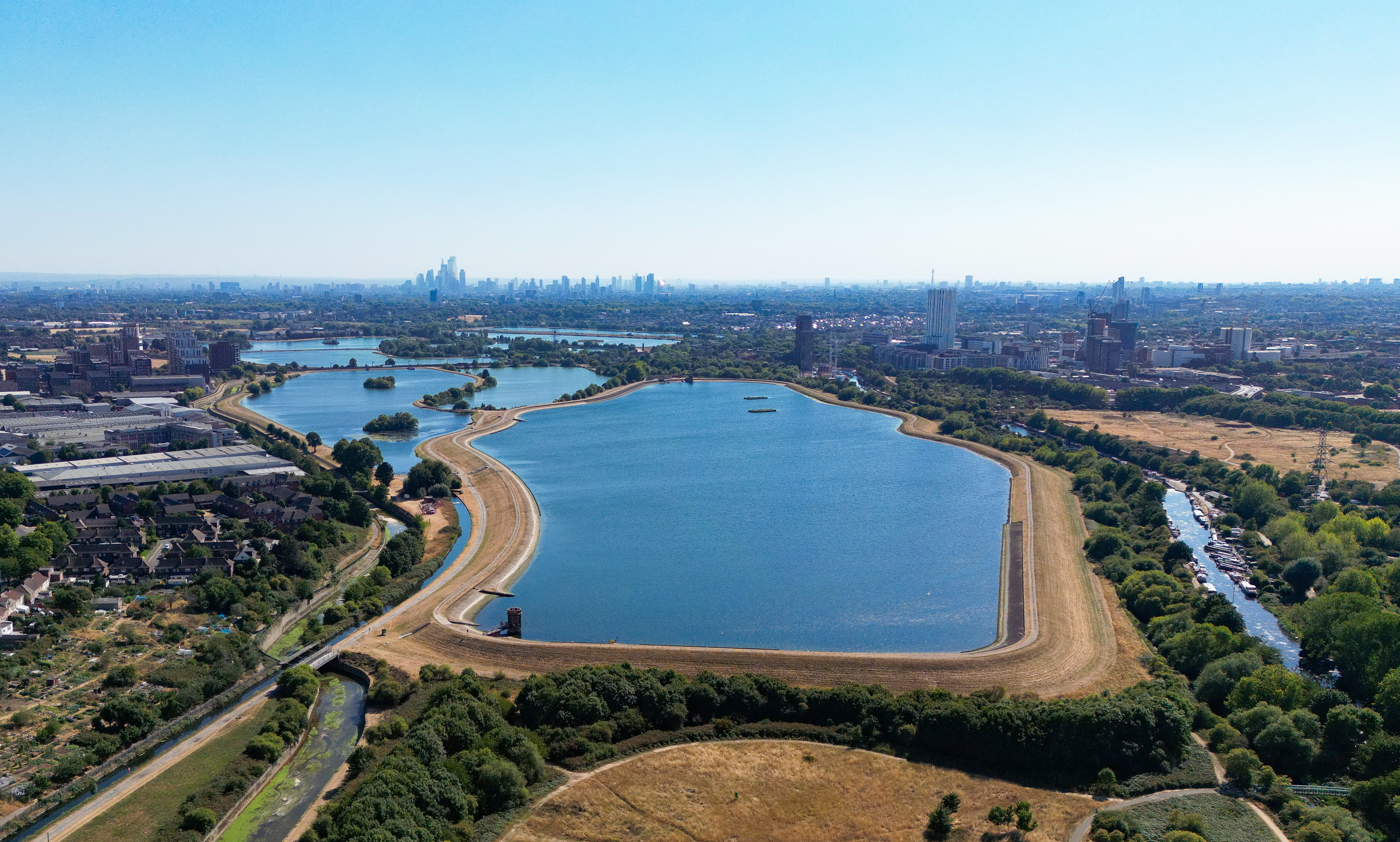
- Lockwood Reservoir with the rest of the Walthamstow Reservoirs in the distance

- Location within London Borough of Waltham Forest
- Location: London Borough of Waltham Forest
- Coordinates: 51.5950°N 0.0479°W
- Type: reservoir
- Basin countries: United Kingdom
- Surface area: 26.6 ha (66 acres)
- Max. depth: 10.4 m (34 ft)
- Water volume: 2.5 Gl (0.55×10^{9} imp gal)

Lockwood Reservoir is located in Walthamstow in the London Borough of Waltham Forest. It is one of the ten Walthamstow Reservoirs, which are part of the Lee Valley Reservoir Chain. The reservoirs supply drinking water to London and are owned by Thames Water.

== Ecology ==
The reservoir is a Site of Special Scientific Interest (SSSI).

== History ==
In 1852, the East London Waterworks Company (ELWC) was granted permission to develop land at Walthamstow for reservoirs and by 1863, the first stage of the reservoirs’ development was completed with the construction of Reservoir Nos. 1, 2 and 3. In 1897, Lockwood was the last reservoir to be created and also the largest – covering 30 hectares and excavated to a depth of around 8 metres. Named after one of the ELWC’s directors, it was a major engineering feat for its day - requiring a huge labour force of 1,250 men. Unlike the first reservoirs, which were dug mainly by hand, Lockwood was constructed with plenty of steam-powered pumps, engines and cranes - as well as a team of 50 horses! The ELWC was taken over by the Metropolitan Water Board in 1904.

== See also ==
- London water supply infrastructure
- List of Sites of Special Scientific Interest in London
