= Hampton Water Treatment Works =

Water-treatment works in London, England

Coordinates: 51.412569°N 0.371447°W

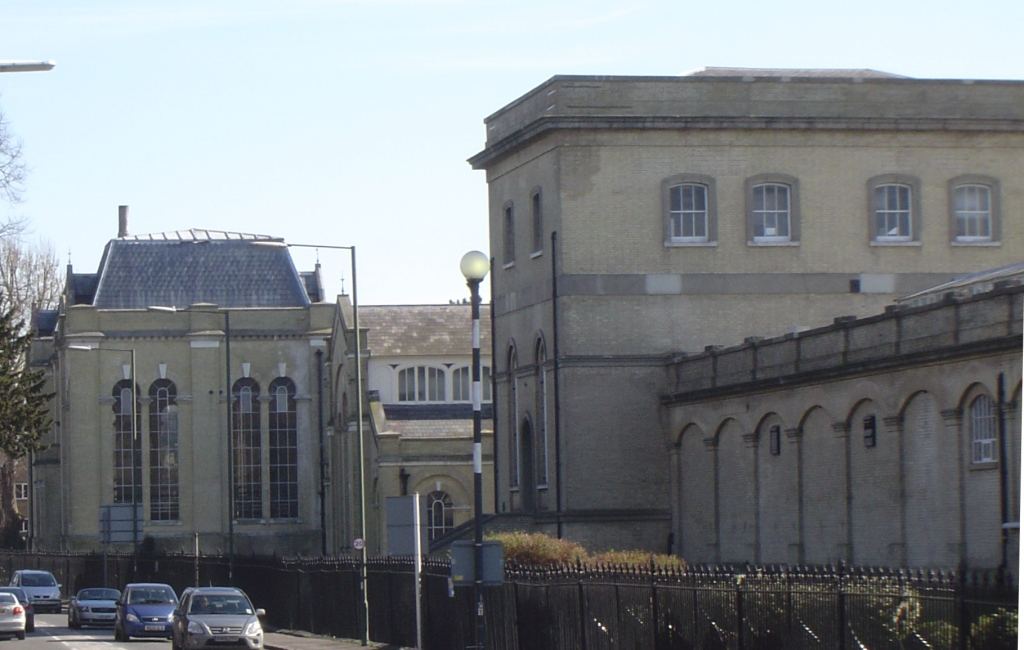
Hampton Water Treatment Works buildings alongside the A308

Hampton Water Treatment Works are water treatment works located on the River Thames in Hampton, London. Built in the second half of the 19th century to supply London with fresh water, the waterworks was in the past a significant local employer, and its brick Italianate pumphouses dominate the local landscape. The waterworks are currently owned and operated by Thames Water, occupying a 66 ha site located between the Upper Sunbury Road (A308) and the River Thames. The waterworks currently has a maximum output of 700 megalitres a day, and supplies ~30% of London's fresh water.

== History ==
=== Metropolis Water Act 1852 ===
The Metropolis Water Act 1852 (15 & 16 Vict. c. 84) first introduced regulation of the supply of water to London ("the Metropolis"), including minimum standards of water quality, transport and treatment, official oversight and approval of all new water sources, and the introduction of a complaints process. Passage of the act followed an outbreak of cholera in London in 1849, and official concern regarding the level of effluent discharged into the River Thames, the main source of domestic water for London's residents. The key provision of the Act was to make it unlawful to take domestic water from the tidal Thames and its tributaries below Teddington Lock. London's water companies moved their operations to sites above the lock during the late 1850s and early 1860s.

=== Construction (1853–55) ===
Construction of waterworks on the north bank of the River Thames near Hampton took place from 1853–55 as a joint venture of the Grand Junction Waterworks Company, the Southwark and Vauxhall Waterworks Company, and the West Middlesex Waterworks Company. The original works were designed by Joseph Quick and constructed by John Aird, comprising sand filter beds to remove suspended solids from the river water, and three pump houses, one for each water company. The massive pump houses were constructed in Gault brick to near-identical Italianate design, with large arched windows and decorative balustrades. Each pump house contained a pair of Cornish 'Bull' Engines installed by Harvey & Co.

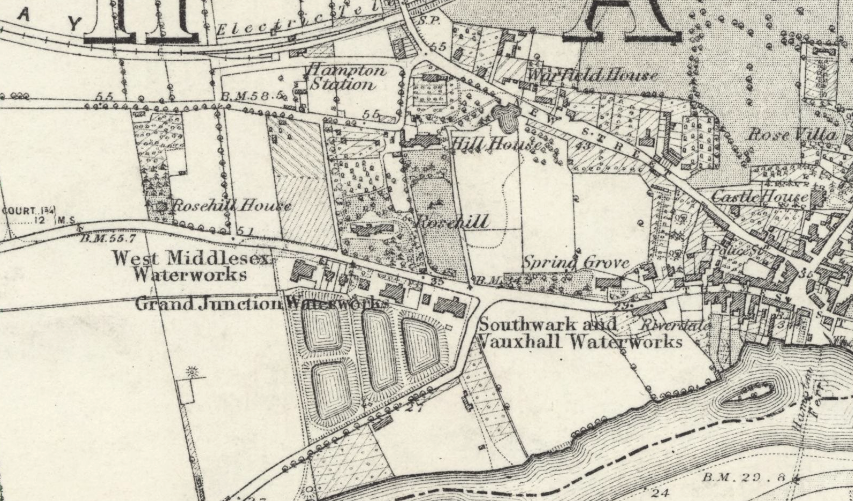
Ordnance Survey map (c1864) showing the original pumphouses and filter beds

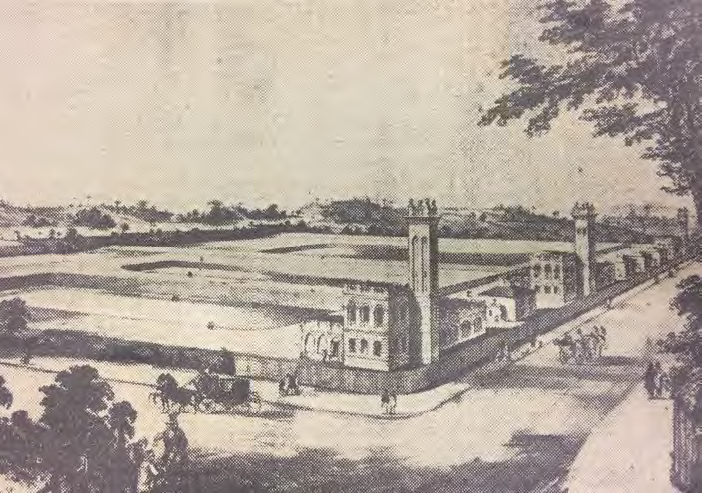
Hampton Water Treatment Works 1855

=== Expansion (1867–1900) ===
In 1867–70, Joseph Quick designed and constructed new works for the Southwark and Vauxhall company on the east side of Lower Sunbury Road. The building comprised two engine houses in the Italianate style linked by a blank-arcaded boiler house, and became known as the Morelands building after the two Moreland and Sons 80-inch beam engines housed in the western engine house. The building was further expanded by J.W. Restler in 1885–86.

The original Grand Junction pump house, known as the Karsdale building, was extended to install a beam engine in 1881–82 by Andrew Frazer. The original Southwark and Vauxhall pump house, which became known as the Ruston building, was also extended in 1881–82 by Restler.

The Riverdale building, constructed for the Southwark and Vauxhall company in 1898–1900 to the east of the Morelands building, comprises a quasi-Elizabethan engine house holding three triple expansion engines fronting Upper Sunbury Road, with a long boiler house with aisles and clerestory set behind to the west. In the parapet of the engine house balcony the barge of the Southwark and Vauxhall company is set in stone.

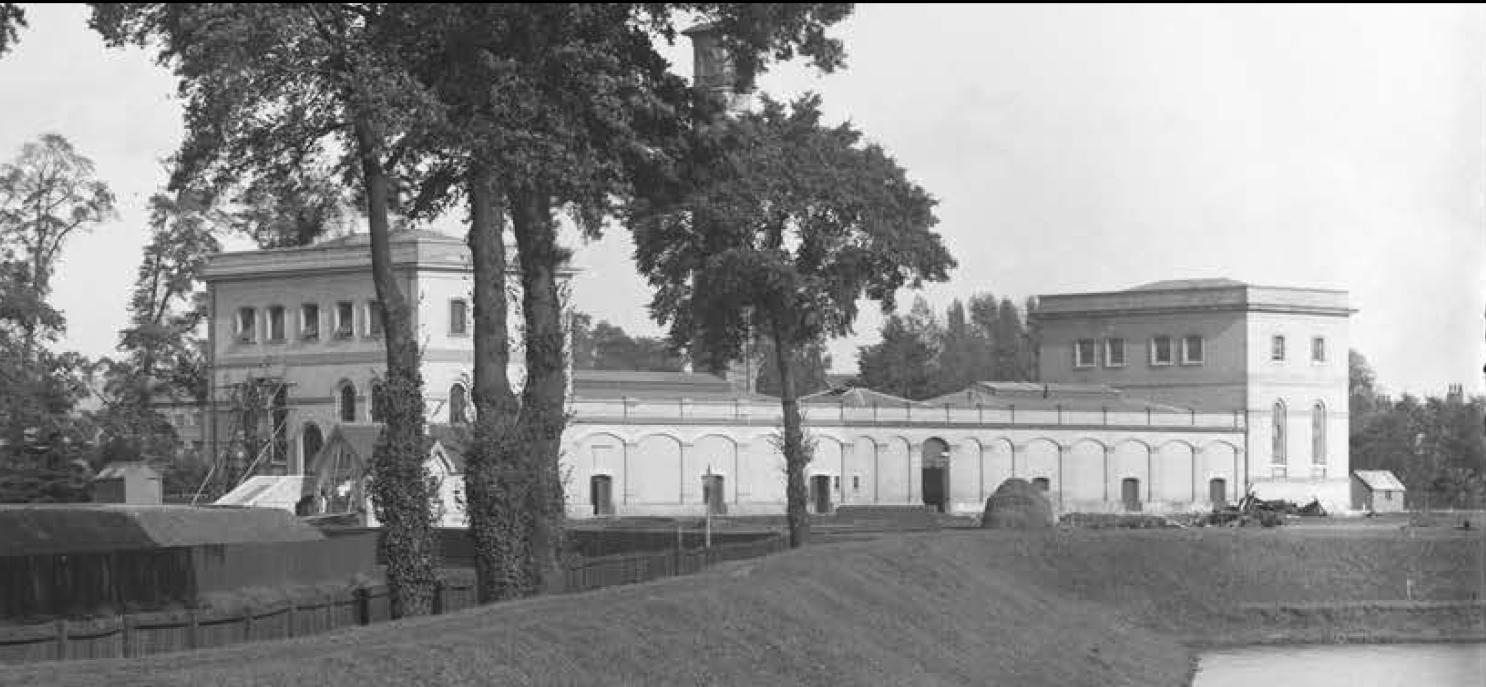
Moreland building c1886

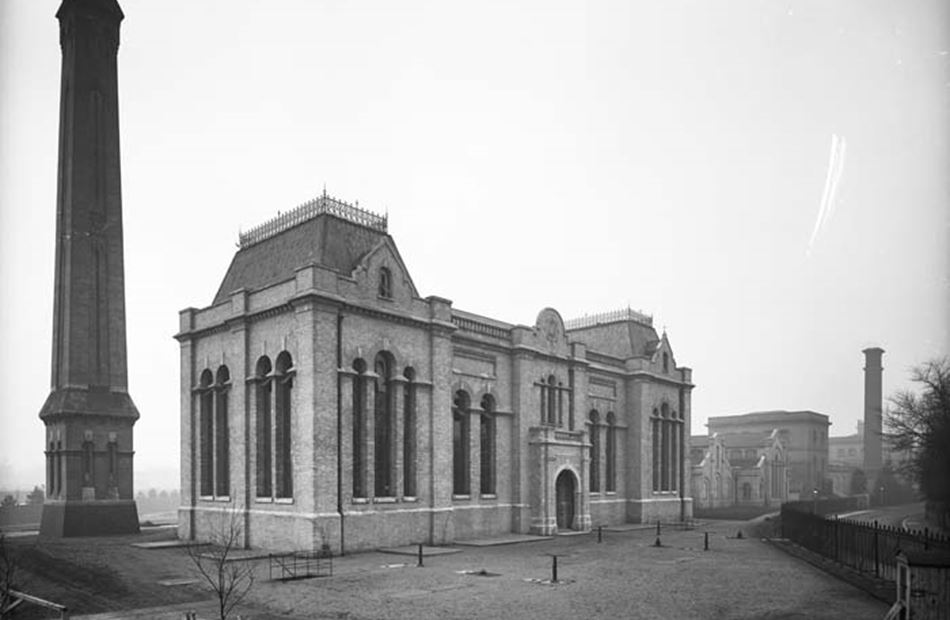
Riverdale building 1901

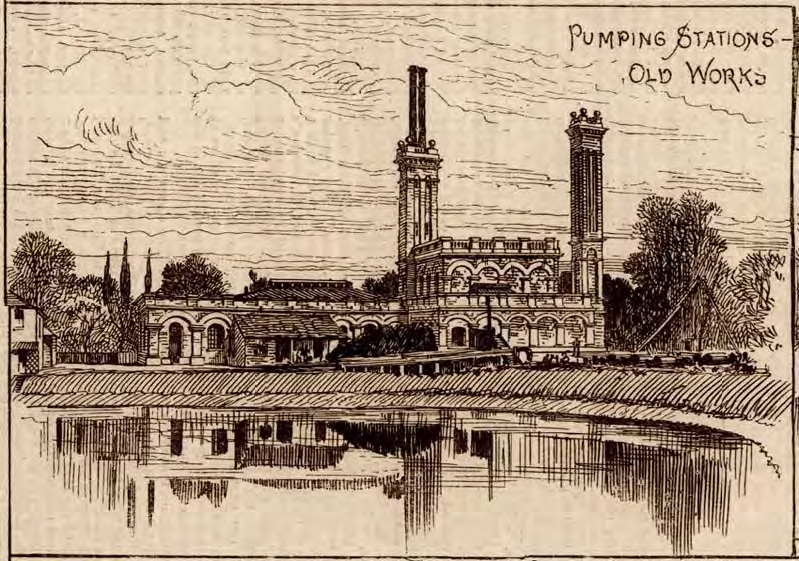
Ruston building 1884

The westernmost West Middlesex pump house ultimately became redundant and was demolished in 1948.

=== Twentieth century ===
The Stilgoe engine house, designed by A.J. Johnson, was constructed 1935-43 to the west of the site, housing eight steam turbine engines. The Davidson filter house and primary filter beds were constructed 1936-47.

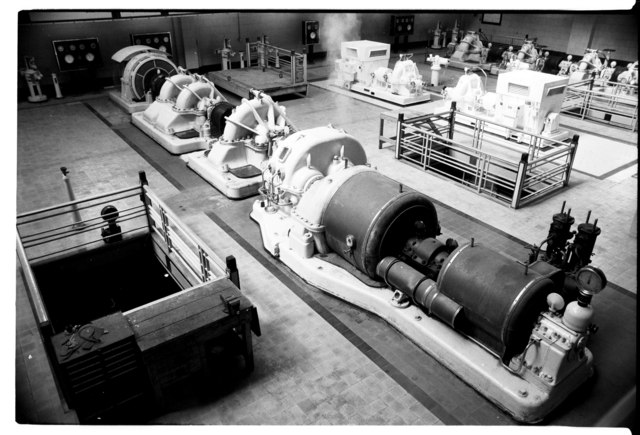
Turbine

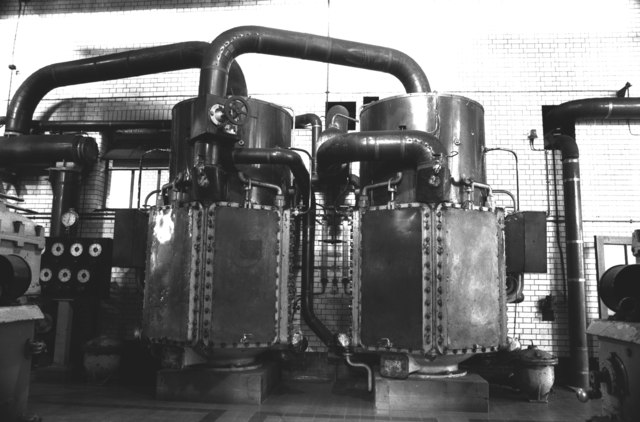
Evaporator

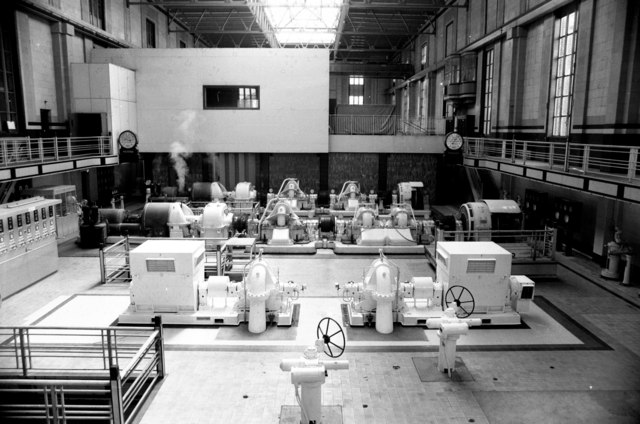
Machinery hall

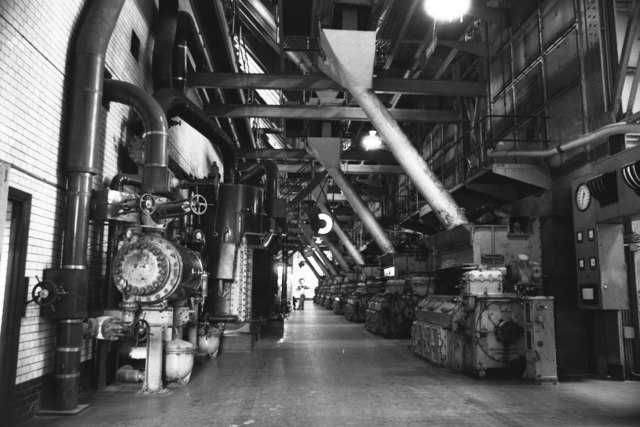
Boilerhouse

Interiors of the Stilgoe building pumphouse (1983)

With the establishment of filter beds between Belgrade Road and Rose Hill in the early 20th century (drained in the 1990s to become Hampton Green), the Waterworks came to dominate the southern and western sides of Hampton. The various water companies were amalgamated into the Metropolitan Water Board in 1902. The image below shows the Waterworks at its greatest extent in 1950.

==== Hampton Water Treatment Works and surrounding area 1950 ====
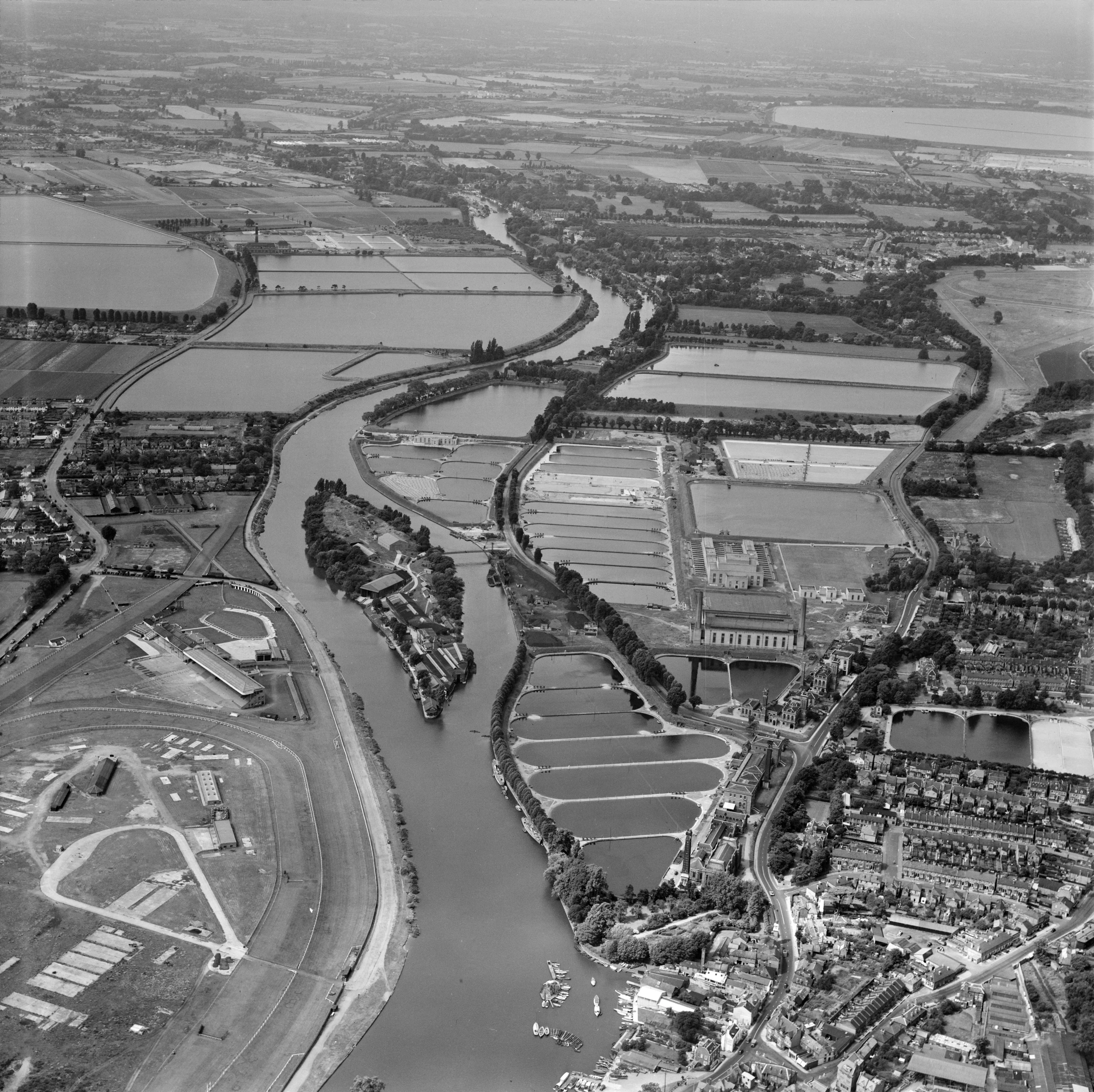
Hampton Water Treatment Works

1	Morelands and Riverdale buildings
2	Karslake and Ruston & Ward buildings
3	Stillgoe building
4	Davidson building

5	West Middlesex pumphouse demolition site
6	Grand Junction reservoir
7	Stain Hill reservoirs
8	Sunnyside reservoir

9	Filter beds
10	Filter beds
11	Filter beds
12	Filter beds

Other water infrastructure

13 / Walton Water Treatment Works; 14 / Knights reservoir	15 / Bessborough reservoir; 16 / Molesey (Chelsea) reservoirs	17 / Molesey (Lambeth) reservoirs; 18 / Queen Mary reservoir

Geographical features

19	Hampton
20	River Thames
21	Benn's Island
22	Platt's Eyot
23	Sunbury Court Island

24	Hurst Park Racecourse
25	Kempton Park Racecourse
26	Hurst Road
27	Lower Sunbury Road
28	Upper Sunbury Road (A308)

29	Station Road
30	Hampton Grammar School
31	Rosehill

Once complete the Waterworks were among the largest in the world at the time, supplying over 400 megalitres a day and requiring over 100 tons of coal for the pumphouses. Coal was supplied on barges unloaded at Hampton wharf and moved by cart to the Waterworks. Difficulties with this arrangement led to the construction of the Metropolitan Water Board Light Railway in 1915. The Railway connected the wharf to the Waterworks and Kempton Park pumping station. The Railway also continued to a standard gauge railway siding at Sunbury station, which allowed for coal to be delivered via the London and South Western Shepperton branch line when the river was in flood or operators were on strike.

== Heritage listing ==
The Karslake, Ruston and Morelands buildings received Grade II listing in 1968. The Waterworks gatehouse, and the cast iron gates and railings enclosing the Riverdale and Morelands buildings were listed Grade II in 1983.

== Operations ==
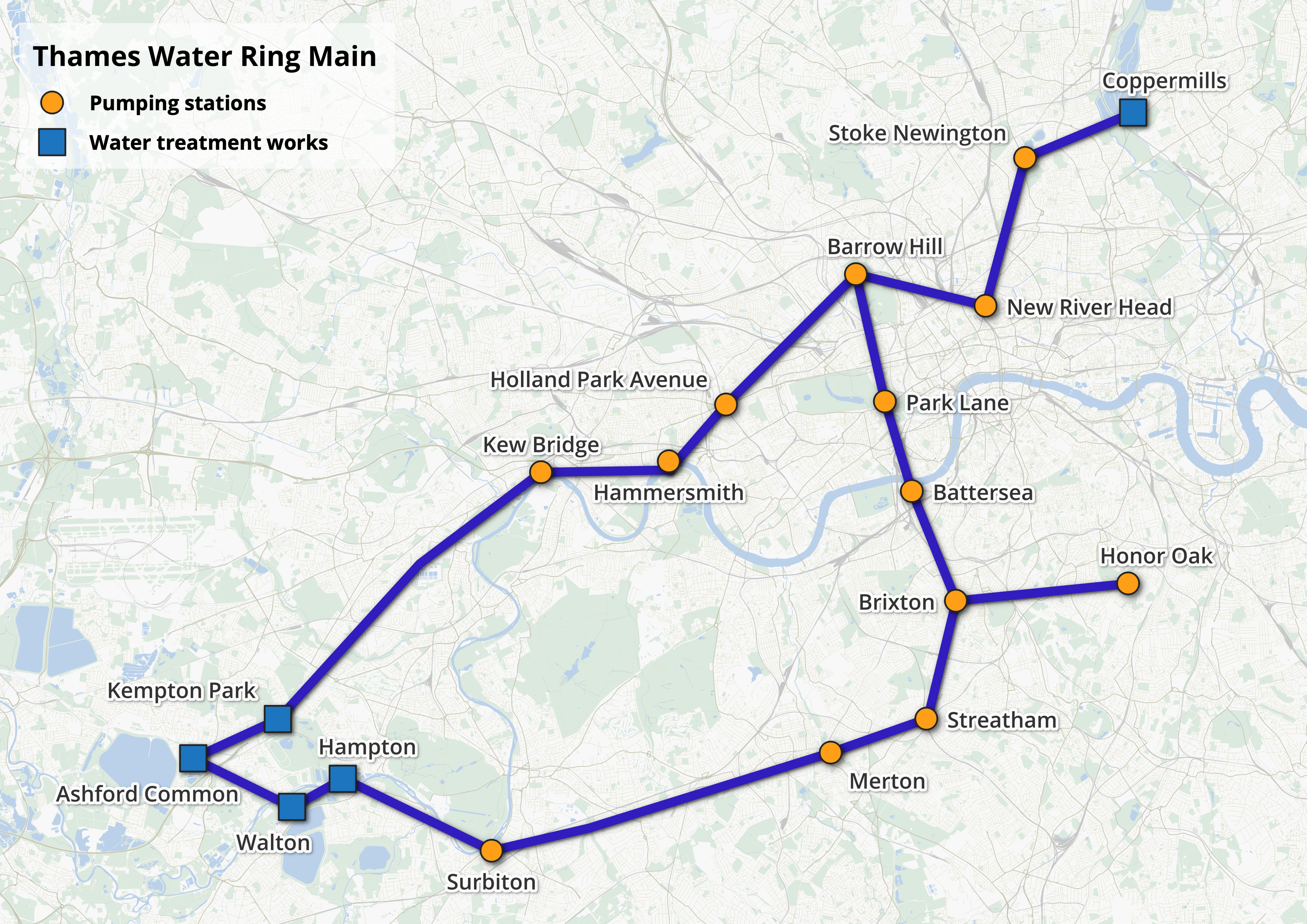
Map of the Thames Water Ring Main in London, showing connected water treatment works and pumping stations.

In addition to water abstracted locally from the Thames the waterworks also receives water from other sources. Water is supplied via the Staines Reservoirs Aqueduct (built 1902) from the King George VI Reservoir (1947) and Staines Reservoirs (1902) which receive their water from the River Thames at Hythe End, just above Bell Weir Lock. The aqueduct passes, and transports water from, the Queen Mary Reservoir (1924) and the Water Treatment Works at Kempton Park, which used to be connected to Hampton via the Metropolitan Water Board Railway. Water was also supplied from the Knight and Bessborough Reservoirs (1907) and the Queen Elizabeth II Reservoir (1962) on the opposite (south) side of the Thames. The Hampton works is also the starting point of the Thames-Lea tunnel (1960) which transfers water to the reservoirs in the Lea Valley.

The waterworks conducts a test of its warning siren (to be used in the event of an unauthorised or accidental release of chlorine or other hazardous material) every Tuesday at approximately 9 a.m. The siren is a former air raid siren dating from the Second World War, and is audible throughout Hampton and Molesey.

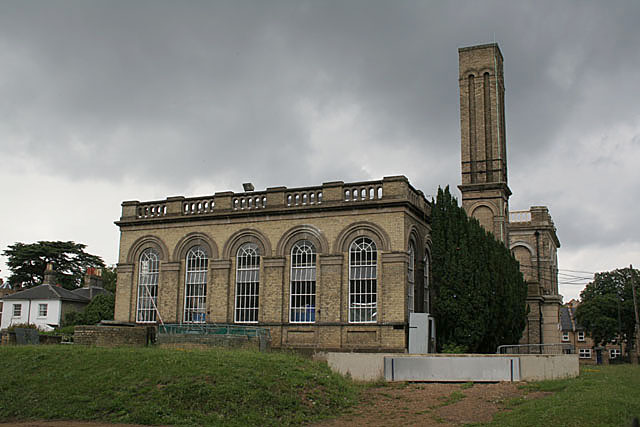
The Ruston pumphouse

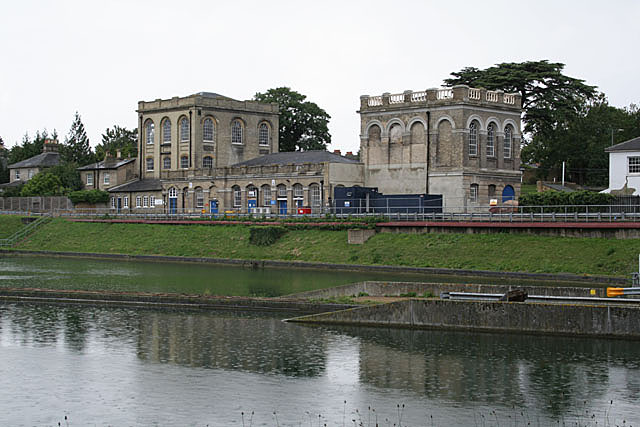
The Beam and Store buildings

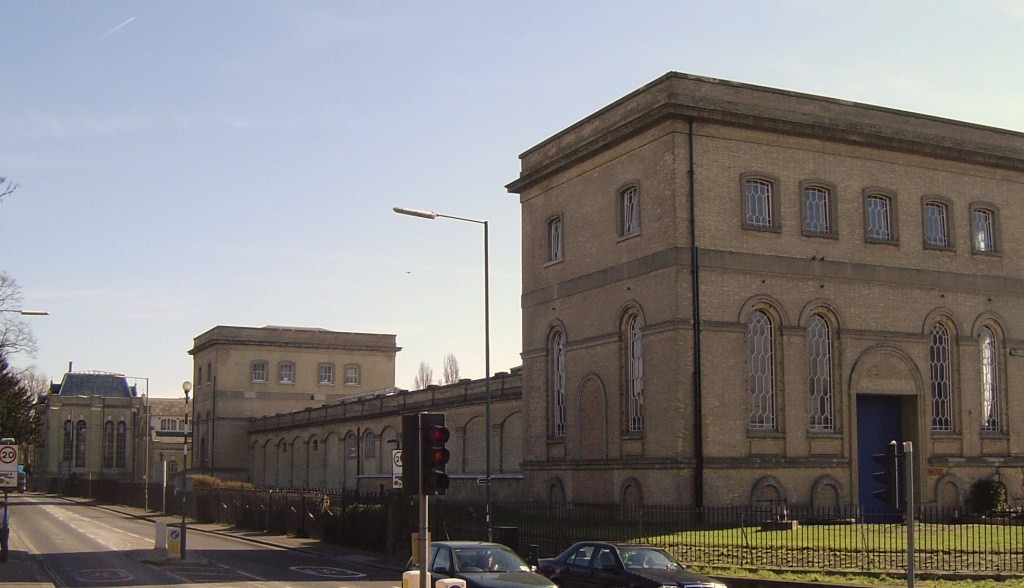
The Morelands building

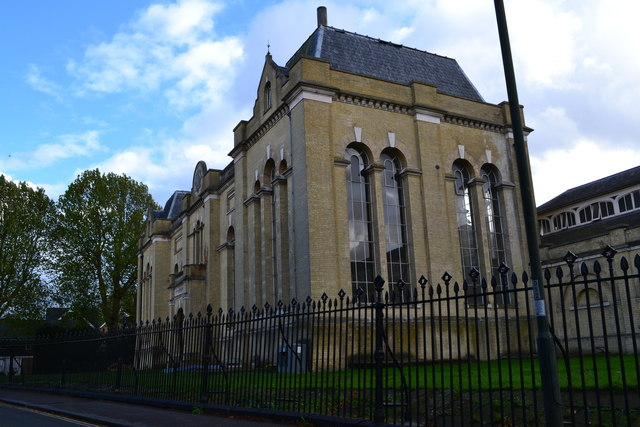
The Riverdale pumphouse

The main pumphouses of Hampton Waterworks (roughly west to east)

== See also ==
- London water supply infrastructure
- Thames Water Ring Main
