= James William Restler =

British engineer (1851–1918)

Sir James William Restler KBE
- Born: 30 August 1851; London
- Died: 4 November 1918 (aged 67); Queen's Gate, London
- Notable work: Honor Oak Reservoir; Hampton Water Treatment Works; Streatham Pumping Station; Walton on Thames Pumping Station and reservoirs
- Honours: Knight Commander of the Order of the British Empire

James William (J.W.) Restler (1851-1918) was an English civil and mechanical engineer. Restler served as Chief Engineer to the Southwark and Vauxhall Waterworks Company from 1883 to 1914, and the Metropolitan Water Board from 1914 until his death in 1918. Restler designed and oversaw the construction of water infrastructure supplying London, including the construction of the Honor Oak reservoir, completed in 1909 and the largest covered reservoir in the world at the time.

== Life ==
J.W. Restler was born in London in 1851, and educated at King's College, London. He began training as an engineer with John Aird & Sons in 1867, during which period he worked on St Katherine's Docks, the Thames Defence Works at Tilbury, and the Southwark and Vauxhall Waterworks Company works at Hampton. He later received training in mechanical work with Harvey and Beck. Restler was appointed assistant engineer at Southwark and Vauxhall in 1876, promoted to the new post of supply engineer in 1881, and in 1883 appointed as the company's chief engineer.

Restler died suddenly at his house in London on 4 November 1918, aged 67.

== Works ==
=== Southwark and Vauxhall Water Company ===
As chief engineer for the Southwark and Vauxhall Water Company, Restler designed and oversaw the construction of water infrastructure across London, including the Streatham pumping station, (Note: Built in 1898 to extract water from natural springs under Streatham Common.) extensions and additions to the Hampton Water Treatment Works, (Note: Restler designed the Riverdale building (1897-1900) and extensions to the Moreland building (1885-86).) and the Walton on Thames reservoirs and pumping station.

Streatham pumping station 1895

JW Restler supervising filter bed construction at Hampton Waterworks c1900

High-speed Multiple Expansion Engine 1898

In 1885 Restler designed and constructed the first large-scale direct-acting rotative pumping engines (pictured), superseding the beam engine in standard use. The pumps were installed in the Riverdale pumphouse at the Hampton Works in 1901 to raise 20 million gallons of water a day from the River Thames to the works' storage and holding reservoirs.

==== Honor Oak / Beechcroft reservoir ====
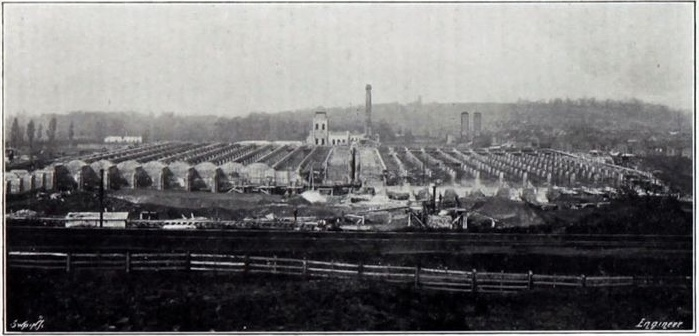
Honor Oak Reservoir under construction 1909

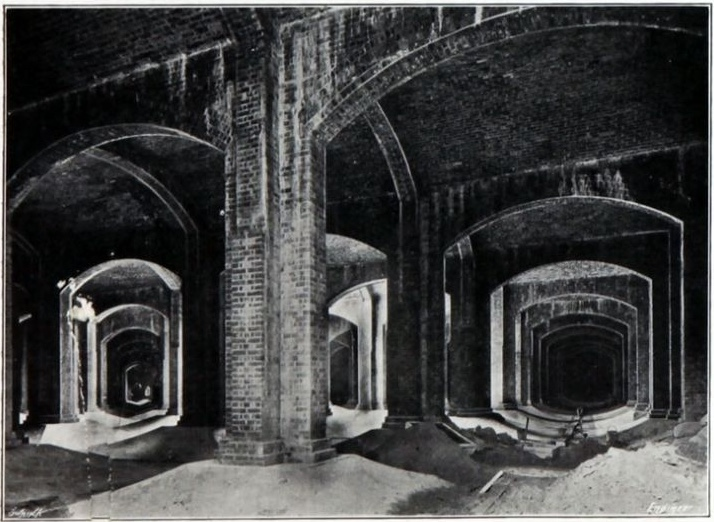
Honor Oak Reservoir interior view 1909

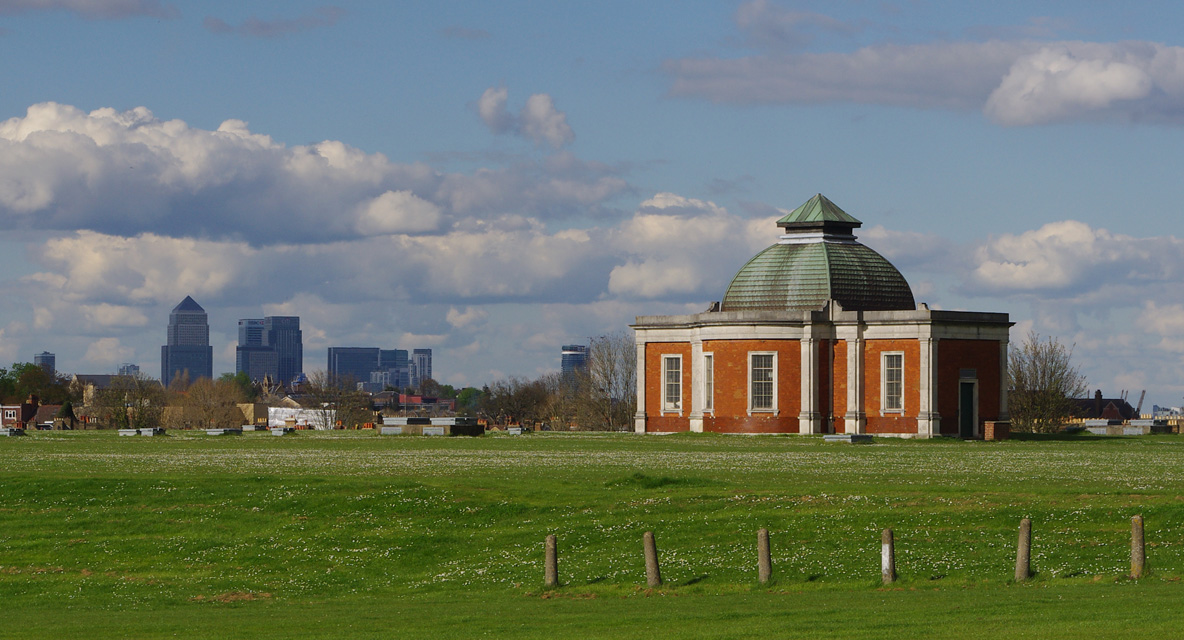
Honor Oak Reservoir pump house present day

Restler designed the Honor Oak reservoir (Note: Also known as the Beachcroft Reservoir, after the first Chairman of the Metropolitan Water Board, Sir Melvill Beachcroft.) constructed between 1898 and 1909 by J. Moran & Sons. A "cathedral built upside down", the reservoir was constructed in four sections, each capable of being filled or emptied independently, using 19 million bricks fired on site from the clay of the hillside into which the reservoir was built. The reservoir covered 14 acres, holding 56.3 million gallons of water piped by a 42 inch main from Hampton Water Treatment Works, making it the largest covered reservoir in the world at the time.

=== Metropolitan Water Board and other appointments ===
In 1914 Restler was appointed Chief Engineer to the Metropolitan Water Board, the municipal body formed in 1903 from London's private water companies to manage the city's water supply. Restler was elected Vice-Chairman of the Board of Management of the Metropolitan Munitions Committee on its formation in June 1915, later becoming its Chair. Restler also served as Chairman of the Rickmansworth and Uxbridge Valley Water Company and St Albans Water Company.

=== WWI service ===
In the early stages of World War I the Director of Works at the Admiralty applied to the Metropolitan Water Board for Restler's advice and oversight of the provision of water supply to Naval establishments. In June 1917 Restler was appointed Chairman of the Fire Brigades Coordination Committee coordinating the response of the fire brigades of London and surrounding areas to fires caused by air raids. (Note: Restler's obituary in The Engineer recording: "Not only did Sir James succeed in the difficult task devolving upon an undertaking of this character, but he took a very active and personal part in the actual work for the protection of the Metropolis during air raids, and on every occasion of a raid he personally proceeded, at considerable danger to himself, the Headquarters of the London Fire Brigade, and also to any of the large fires that occurred.") For his service during the War, Restler was awarded Knight Commander of the Order of the British Empire.

== See also ==
- London water supply infrastructure
- Metropolis Water Act 1852
