= Thames Conservancy Act 1911 =

Act of the Parliament of the United Kingdom

Thames Conservancy Act 1911 (Note: Section 1.)
- Act of Parliament
- Parliament of the United Kingdom
- Long title: An Act to amend and consolidate the enactments relating to the abstraction of water from the River Thames by the Metropolitan Water Board and the payments made by that board to the Conservators of the River Thames and for other purposes.
- Citation: 1 & 2 Geo. 5. c. lvii
- Territorial extent: United Kingdom

Dates
- Royal assent: 18 August 1911
- Commencement: 1 September 1911 (Note: Section 2.)
- Repealed: 16 June 1932
Other legislation
Amends	Woking Water and Gas Act 1899
Repeals/revokes	See § Repealed enactments
Repealed by	Thames Conservancy Act 1932

Status: Repealed

Text of statute as originally enacted

The Thames Conservancy Act 1911 (1 & 2 Geo. 5. c. lvii) was an act of the Parliament of the United Kingdom that amended and consolidated the enactments relating to the abstraction of water from the River Thames by the Metropolitan Water Board and the payments made by that board to the Conservators of the River Thames.

== Provisions ==
=== Repealed enactments ===
Section 21(1) of the act repealed 18 enactments, listed in part I of the schedule to the act, so far as they regulated the taking of water by the board or the payments to be made by the board.

Citation	Short title	Extent of repeal
46 Geo. 3. c. cxix	West Middlesex Waterworks Act 1806	Sections 73 and 74 (power to cut into the River Thames and take water therefrom).
5 & 6 Will. 4. c. xcv	Grand Junction Waterworks Company Act 1835	Section 3 (power to obtain water from a higher part of the river).
11 & 12 Vict. c. vii	Lambeth Waterworks Act 1848	Sections 31 and 41 (power to take water from the Thames at Long Ditton; no water to be taken from the Thames except at Long Ditton after completion of works).
15 & 16 Vict. c. clvi	Chelsea Waterworks Act 1852	Sections 43 and 67 (power to take water from the Thames; company may continue to draw water from the Thames).
15 & 16 Vict. c. clvii	Grand Junction Waterworks Act 1852	Section 36 (power to take water from the Thames).
15 & 16 Vict. c. clviii	Southwark and Vauxhall Water Act 1852	Section 9 (so far as it relates to the taking of water from the Thames), section 42 (power to take water from the Thames) and section 86 (certain sections of recited acts to remain in force).
15 & 16 Vict. c. clix	West Middlesex Waterworks Act 1852	Section 21 (power to take water from the Thames).
29 Vict. c. vi	West Middlesex Water Act 1866	Section 8 (limit of water to be taken from the Thames).
30 & 31 Vict. c. cxlviii	East London Waterworks (Thames Supply) Act 1867	Sections 21 to 25, 29 and 30 (power to take water from the Thames; power to erect flood gauge; payments to Conservators; contributions to be first charge on receipts; payments to be without deduction; access to works; provision for estimating supply of water to the company).
34 & 35 Vict. c. lxxxiii	Lambeth Waterworks Act 1871	Section 15 (power to take water from the Thames in West Molesey) and section 24 (saving agreement of 24 June 1851).
38 & 39 Vict. c. cviii	Chelsea Waterworks Act 1875	Section 25 (power to take water from the Thames) and section 26 (saving rights of the Conservators under an agreement dated 17 June 1852).
49 & 50 Vict. c. lxxxv	Southwark and Vauxhall Water Act 1886	Subsection 6 of section 12 (for the protection of the Conservators).
57 & 58 Vict. c. clxxxvii	Thames Conservancy Act 1894	Sections 292 to 297 (contributions by companies; contributions to be first charge on receipts; payments of companies to be without deduction and free from taxes; power of intersale by metropolitan water companies; restriction on quantity of water which may be taken by companies; ascertaining quantities of water taken from the Thames), each except so far as it relates to the West Surrey Water Company and the South West Suburban Water Company.
59 & 60 Vict. c. ccxli	Staines Reservoirs, &c. Act 1896	Sections 55, 58, 59, 61 and 62 (power to take waters of the Thames; ascertaining quantities of water taken from the Thames; water taken not to be supplied to other companies; payments to Conservators by joint committee; ascertaining flow of water at Penton Hook).
61 & 62 Vict. c. cxv	Southwark and Vauxhall Water Act 1898	Sections 15 to 19 and 21 (increase of company's power to take water from the Thames; limit of amount of water which may be delivered to consumers; ascertaining quantities of water taken from the Thames and delivered to consumers; ascertaining flow of water over Penton Hook Weir; water taken not to be supplied to other companies; payments to Conservators).
62 & 63 Vict. c. xci	West Middlesex Waterworks Act 1899	Sections 21, 22, 23, 25 and 27 (increase of company's power to take water from the Thames; ascertaining quantities of water taken from the Thames and delivered to consumers; ascertaining flow of water over Molesey Weir; penalty as to taking excess water; payments to Conservators).
63 & 64 Vict. c. cxli	Lambeth Waterworks Act 1900	Sections 20 to 26 and 28 (supply of water to new works; provisions as to gravel water; power to take water in excess of quantity authorised; payments to Conservators; payment for water for filling reservoirs; moneys paid to Conservators to be carried to the upper navigation fund; ascertaining flow of water over Molesey Weir; penalties for taking water contrary to notice or in larger quantity than authorised).
63 & 64 Vict. c. ccxii	East London Waterworks Act 1900	Sections 26 to 31 and 34 (increase of company's power to take water from the Thames; ascertaining quantities of water taken from the Thames and delivered to consumers; ascertaining flow of water over Molesey Weir; payment to Conservators in respect of Molesey Weir; payments to Conservators in respect of excess water; penalty as to taking excess water; powers to be exercised only with the sanction of the Local Government Board).

Section 21(2) of the act also cancelled, as from the commencement of the act, ten agreements listed in part II of the schedule to the act: agreements dated between 24 June 1851 and 23 June 1852 between each of the Chelsea Waterworks, Lambeth Waterworks, Grand Junction Waterworks, Southwark and Vauxhall Water, and West Middlesex Waterworks companies and the mayor and commonalty and citizens of the City of London, together with a confirmatory agreement dated 23 December 1886 between each of those companies and the Conservators.

== Subsequent developments ==
The whole act was repealed by section 6 of, and the first schedule to, the Thames Conservancy Act 1932 (22 & 23 Geo. 5. c. xxxvii), which came into force on 16 June 1932.
