= Metropolis Water Act =

The name Metropolis Water Act was given to five Acts of the United Kingdom Parliament:

- Metropolis Water Act 1852 (15 & 16 Vict. c. 84)
- Metropolis Water Act 1871 (34 & 35 Vict. c. 113)
- Metropolis Water Act 1897 (60 & 61 Vict. c. 56)
- Metropolis Water Act 1899 (62 & 63 Vict. c. 7)
- Metropolis Water Act 1902 (2 Edw. 7. c. 41)
