= Municipal (disambiguation) =

Municipal is the adjective of municipality.

Municipal may also refer to:

- Municipal bond, or "muni", a financial bond issued in the United States and in other countries
- Municipalization, the transfer of non-municipal assets to municipal ownership
- Municipal law, the law governing the internal affairs of a country, as opposed to international law

== Sports ==
- C.S.D. Municipal, a football club from Guatemala City
- Deportivo Municipal, a football club from Lima, Peru
- Once Municipal, a football club from Ahuachapán, El Salvador
