= West Middlesex Waterworks Act 1806 =

Act of the Parliament of the United Kingdom

West Middlesex Waterworks Act 1806 (Note: Section 2 of the West Middlesex Waterworks Act 1852 (15 & 16 Vict. c. clix).)
- Act of Parliament
- Parliament of the United Kingdom
- Long title: An Act for supplying with Water the Inhabitants of Kensington, Hammersmith, Brentford, Battersey, Putney, Richmond and several other Parishes and Places in the Counties of Middlesex and Surrey.
- Citation: 46 Geo. 3. c. cxix
- Territorial extent: United Kingdom

Dates
- Royal assent: 12 July 1806
- Commencement: 12 July 1806 (Note: The Acts of Parliament (Commencement) Act 1793.)
Other legislation
Amended by	West Middlesex Waterworks Act 1810; West Middlesex Waterworks Act 1813; South London Water Works Act 1813; West Middlesex Waterworks Act 1852; Thames Conservancy Act 1911
Relates to	Richmond (Surrey) Water Act 1835

Status: Amended

Text of statute as originally enacted

The West Middlesex Waterworks Act 1806 (46 Geo. 3. c. cxix) is an act of the Parliament of the United Kingdom of Great Britain and Ireland that incorporated and established the West Middlesex Waterworks Company for the purposes of supplying various parishes and townships in the counties of Middlesex and Surrey from the River Thames.

The act authorised the proprietors of the West Middlesex Waterworks Company to raise £30,000, divided into shares of £100 each, with power to raise a further sum of £50,000.

== Background ==
The population of various parishes and townships in the counties of Middlesex (Chelsea, Westminster, Kensington, Hammersmith, Fulham, Chiswick, Ealing, Old Brentford, New Brentford, Heston, Hounslow and Isleworth) and Surrey (Battersea, Wandsworth, Putney, Barnes, Mortlake, Richmond and Kew) had grown in the late 17th and early 18th centuries, increasing demand for water.

Entrepreneur Ralph Dodd and other proprietors sought to supply water to parts of West London, including Marylebone and Paddington, in the counties of Middlesex and Surrey

== Provisions ==
The act enacted that:

- Reservoirs be made near Bull Lane, Fulham, Poole's Creek and Honey Lane, Kensington, with cuts, channels and aqueducts to supply the parishes and townships.
- Proprietors be united and incorporated into a body politick and corporate, The Company of Proprietors of the West Middlesex Waterworks.
- The Company may raise among themselves a sum of money not exceeding £30,000, divided into shares of £100 each, not usually exceeding 5 per owner.
- Shares to be personal estate, not real property.
- Subscribers to have a vote for every share, not exceeding 5 in whole, that may be given by proxy in the form specified
- Proprietors not entitled to vote unless they have possessed their shares for two calendar months.
- If the authorised sum of £30,000 is not enough, then proprietors can raise an additional sum amongst themselves, not exceeding £50,000.
- Proprietors can raise the additional £50,000 by a mortgage in the form specified that may be assigned in the form specified.
- Mortgage interest shall be paid half-yearly.
- Mortgagees are not to be considered as proprietors of shares.
- Notice to be given on paying off the money.
- First general meeting of the company shall be held at the Freemasons' Tavern on Great Queen Street, Lincoln's inn Fields at 11:00am on the first Tuesday fourth weeks after the passing of the act. All future general meetings shall be held at 11:00am on the first Tuesday of May and November every year.
- At the first general meeting, 12 directors should be elected to serve until the next May general meeting.
- Chairman to be appointed with the casting vote.
- Officers to be appointed, including treasurer(s), engineers, clerks and collectors.
- Shares may be sold in the form specified.
- The company has the power to make and maintain waterworks, reservoirs, aqueducts, water wheels, fire engines etc. for the supply of the specified parishes and townships with water from the River Thames.
- The company be refrained from making use of certain lands belonging to William Edwardes, 2nd Baron Kensington, Lord of the Manor of Earl's Court.
