= Joseph Quick (engineer) =

British civil engineer (1809–1894)

- Born: 6 November 1809; Chelsea, London, England, UK
- Died: 30 March 1894 (aged 84); Clapham Park, London, England, UK
- Resting place: Norwood Cemetery, London, England, UK
- Spouses: Elizabeth; Mary Ann
- Children: Joseph Quick
- Parent(s): Joseph Quick (father); Mary Ann Quick (mother)
- Engineering career
- Discipline: Civil engineering
- Projects: London Water infrastructure

Joseph Quick (6 November 1809 in Chelsea, London – 30 March 1894 in Clapham Park) was an English civil engineer who was closely involved in improvements to supply piped water in the great industrial cities of the nineteenth century. Both his father and his son (author of The Water Supply of the Metropolis. London and New York: 1880) were also waterworks engineers by the name Joseph Quick.

On 28 March 1844, as engineer to the Southwark Waterworks, Quick was called to give evidence before the Health and Towns Commissioners of the British Parliament. Again after the 1848/49 outbreak of cholera in London, he was one of the advisors to the government to improve the London water supply infrastructure. One proposal was to have all intake of water from the Thames moved from the tidal Thames to up-river of Teddington Lock. The expert evidence heard by parliament led to the Metropolis Water Act (1852), as a result of which Quick was entrusted with the building of the new Hampton Waterworks,which he designed in an Italianate style.

Even before work at Hampton was complete, contamination of the water supply of the Southwark and Vauxhall Waterworks Company, providing water to the borough of Southwark, Battersea, and other locations in the vicinity, led to the 1853 cholera outbreak. A further cholera outbreak in Soho in 1854 added to the urgency. Both outbreaks were famously studied by Dr John Snow. The company's new facilities up-river at Hampton (shared with two other water companies) only came into operation in 1855.

By 1851, Quick was also consulting engineer to the Grand Junction Waterworks Company. As such he bore responsibility for the water tower constructed in 1857–58 on Campden Hill, of which there is a well-known contemporary print, although he himself was not the designer.

In 1857, together with Alexander Fraser, he was granted a patent for "improvements in apparatus for regulating the drawing off and supply of water and other fluids".

Quick's expertise as a waterworks engineer was such that together with his son he set up an international consultancy, and in the 1860s became involved in projects for the provision of modern water supplies in Amsterdam, Berlin, Saint Petersburg, Antwerp and Beirut. In St Petersburg the open filter method that proved highly successful in Amsterdam turned out to be entirely unsuitable to local climatic conditions.

== Family ==
He was born on 6 November 1809 to Joseph and Mary Ann Quick in Chelsea, and baptised on 6 December 1809 at St Luke's Church.

He married at least twice:

1. about 1830, to Elizabeth (died early 1843), with children: Ann, Elizabeth, Joseph, John, Henry
2. on 24 May 1843, as a widower, he married Mary Ann Glover at St Matthew's Church, Brixton, with children: Mary Ann.

He died on 30 March 1894 at his home Winstone, Clapham Park, London, and was buried on 3 April 1894 at Norwood Cemetery.
