= Sunnyside Reservoir =

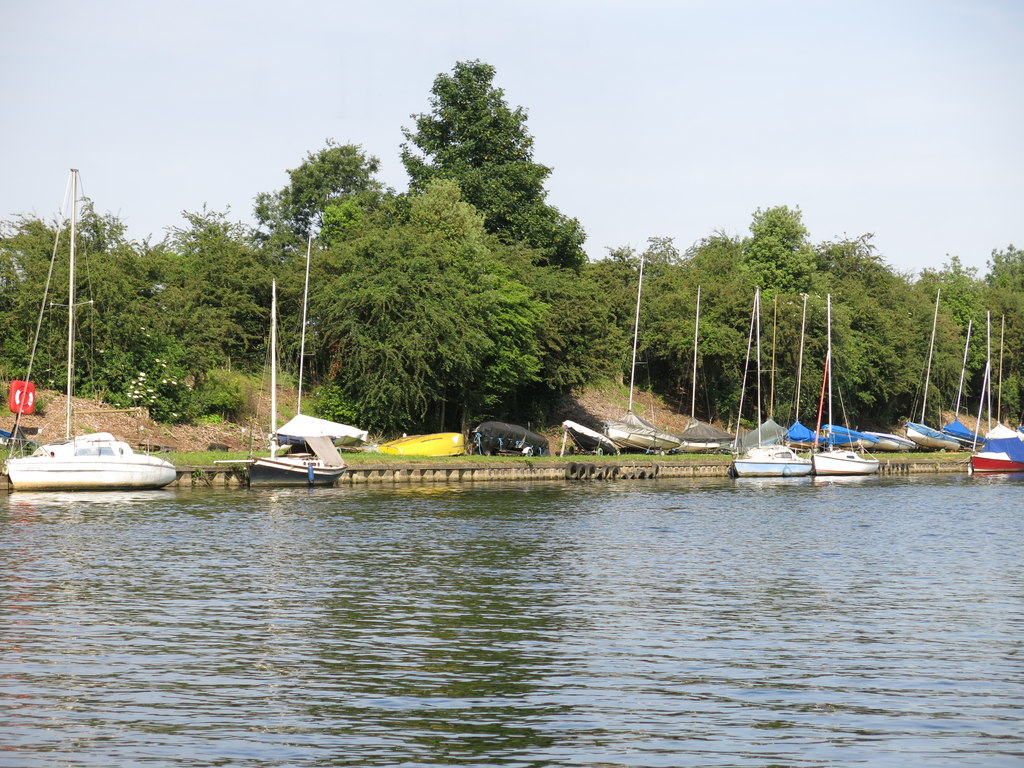
- The River Thames by the western end of Sunnyside Reservoir, June 2018

- Location within London Borough of Richmond upon Thames
- Location: Richmond-upon-Thames
- Coordinates: 51°24′33″N 0°22′52″W
- Type: reservoir
- Basin countries: United Kingdom
- Built: 1896
- Islands: None

Sunnyside Reservoir is a reservoir forming part of the Hampton Water Treatment Works within the London Borough of Richmond-upon-Thames.

== History ==
The reservoir was originally built by the Southwark and Vauxhall Waterworks Company in 1896 for pre-treatment water storage. It has an area of 6.8 acres (2.74 ha), is 35 ft (11 m) deep and has a capacity of 292 Megalitres. The walls of the reservoir are made from 3 ft (1 m) of puddle clay.

The reservoir is now used as a settlement lagoon for washwater from the adjacent treatment works before the water is discharged back to the River Thames. The reservoir is now owned and managed by Thames Water.

There was an idea to build a bridge for cyclists and pedestrians over the river adjacent to the reservoir in 2002, but this was very expensive and was not progressed.
