= West Middlesex Waterworks Company =

Utility company supplying west London 1806–1903

The Company of Proprietors of the West Middlesex Water Works Company
- Company type: Public
- Traded as: West Middlesex Waterworks Company
- Industry: Water supply
- Founded: 1806 in London, UK
- Founder: Ralph Dodd
- Defunct: June 24, 1904
- Fate: Municipalised
- Successor: Metropolitan Water Board

West Middlesex Waterworks Act 1810 (Note: Section 2 of the West Middlesex Waterworks Act 1852 (15 & 16 Vict. c. clix).)
- Act of Parliament
- Parliament of the United Kingdom
- Long title: An Act to enable the Company of Proprietors of the West Middlesex Waterworks to raise a further Sum of Money; and to alter, vary, amend and enlarge the Powers of the Act passed in the Forty sixth Year of His present Majesty, for making the said Waterworks; and for extending the same.
- Citation: 50 Geo. 3. c. cxxxii
- Territorial extent: United Kingdom

Dates
- Royal assent: 24 May 1810
- Commencement: 24 May 1810 (Note: The Acts of Parliament (Commencement) Act 1793.)

Other legislation
- Amends: West Middlesex Waterworks Act 1806
- Amended by: West Middlesex Waterworks Act 1813; West Middlesex Waterworks Act 1852; Metropolitan Water Board (Charges) Act 1907
- Relates to: Richmond (Surrey) Water Act 1835

Status: Amended

Text of statute as originally enacted

West Middlesex Waterworks Act 1813
- Act of Parliament
- Parliament of the United Kingdom
- Long title: An Act to authorize the Company of Proprietors of the West Middlesex Waterworks to raise a further Sum of Money, for enabling them more effectually to carry on their Works.
- Citation: 53 Geo. 3. c. xxxvi
- Territorial extent: United Kingdom

Dates
- Royal assent: 15 April 1813
- Commencement: 15 April 1813

Other legislation
- Amends: West Middlesex Waterworks Act 1806; West Middlesex Waterworks Act 1810
- Amended by: West Middlesex Waterworks Act 1852
- Relates to: Richmond (Surrey) Water Act 1835

Status: Amended

Text of statute as originally enacted

West Middlesex Waterworks Act 1852 (Note: Section 2.)
- Act of Parliament
- Parliament of the United Kingdom
- Long title: An Act for enabling the Company of Proprietors of the West Middlesex Waterworks to obtain by Agreement a Supply of Water from the Thames above the Reach of the Tide, and to raise further Capital, and for other Purposes.
- Citation: 15 & 16 Vict. c. clix
- Territorial extent: United Kingdom

Dates
- Royal assent: 30 June 1852
- Commencement: 22 July 1852 (Note: Section 1.)

Other legislation
- Amends: West Middlesex Waterworks Act 1806; West Middlesex Waterworks Act 1810; West Middlesex Waterworks Act 1813
- Amended by: New River Company's Act 1857; West Middlesex Water Act 1866; Metropolitan Water Board (Charges) Act 1907; Thames Conservancy Act 1911

Status: Amended

Text of statute as originally enacted

West Middlesex Waterworks Act 1860
- Act of Parliament
- Parliament of the United Kingdom
- Long title: An Act to enable the Company of Proprietors of the West Middlesex Waterworks to raise a further Sum of Money; and for other Purposes.
- Citation: 23 & 24 Vict. c. i
- Territorial extent: United Kingdom

Dates
- Royal assent: 23 March 1860
- Commencement: 23 March 1860

Status: Current legislation

Text of statute as originally enacted

West Middlesex Water Act 1866
- Act of Parliament
- Parliament of the United Kingdom
- Long title: An Act for extending the Limits within which the West Middlesex Waterworks Company may supply Water, and for other Purposes.
- Citation: 29 & 30 Vict. c. vi
- Territorial extent: United Kingdom

Dates
- Royal assent: 30 April 1866
- Commencement: 30 April 1866

Other legislation
- Amends: West Middlesex Waterworks Act 1852
- Amended by: Metropolitan Water Board (Charges) Act 1907; Thames Conservancy Act 1911

Status: Amended

West Middlesex Waterworks Act 1869
- Act of Parliament
- Parliament of the United Kingdom
- Long title: An Act to enable the Company of Proprietors of the West Middlesex Waterworks to raise a further sum of money; and for other purposes.
- Citation: 32 & 33 Vict. c. i
- Territorial extent: United Kingdom

Dates
- Royal assent: 13 May 1869
- Commencement: 13 May 1869

Status: Current legislation

Text of statute as originally enacted

West Middlesex Waterworks Act 1894
- Act of Parliament
- Parliament of the United Kingdom
- Long title: An Act to authorise the Company of Proprietors of the West Middlesex Waterworks to raise additional capital and for other purposes.
- Citation: 57 & 58 Vict. c. clxv
- Territorial extent: United Kingdom

Dates
- Royal assent: 17 August 1894
- Commencement: 17 August 1894

Status: Current legislation

Text of statute as originally enacted

West Middlesex Waterworks Act 1899
- Act of Parliament
- Parliament of the United Kingdom
- Long title: An Act to confer further powers upon the Company of Proprietors of the West Middlesex Waterworks with respect to the construction of works the taking of water from the River Thames and the raising of capital and for other purposes.
- Citation: 62 & 63 Vict. c. xci
- Territorial extent: United Kingdom

Dates
- Royal assent: 13 July 1899
- Commencement: 13 July 1899

Other legislation
- Amended by: Thames Conservancy Act 1911

Status: Amended

Text of statute as originally enacted

The West Middlesex Waterworks Company (also known as The Company of Proprietors of the West Middlesex Water Works Company) was a utility company supplying water to parts of West London in England. The company was established in 1806 with works at Hammersmith and became part of the publicly owned Metropolitan Water Board in 1904.

== Origins ==
The West Middlesex Waterworks Company was founded by serial entrepreneur Ralph Dodd in 1806 to supply water to parts of West London, including Marylebone and Paddington, in the counties of Middlesex and Surrey from the River Thames.

On 12 July 1806, the Company of Proprietors of the West Middlesex Water Works was incorporated by the West Middlesex Waterworks Act 1806 (46 Geo. 3. c. cxix). The act authorised the proprietors of the West Middlesex Waterworks Company to raise £30,000, divided into shares of £100 each, with power to raise a further sum of £50,000.

In 1808 the company installed cast iron pipes to supply water from its intakes at Hammersmith.

== Infrastructure ==
The water company established a 3.5 million gallon reservoir at Campden Hill near Notting Hill just west of Central London. Soon after, in 1825 the company built a new reservoir at Barrow Hill next to Primrose Hill just north of Central London. In the 1850s the quality of drinking water in London was connected to poor public health. John Snow examined the state of waters in 1849 and noted that the West Middlesex was less subject to cholera because its intakes were upstream and it had large reservoirs. The Metropolis Water Act 1852 (15 & 16 Vict. c. 84) was enacted under the conclusions of a report of the Metropolitan Water Board "to make provision for securing the supply to the Metropolis of pure and wholesome water". Under the act it became unlawful for any water company to extract water for domestic use from the tidal reaches of the Thames after 31 August 1855, and from 31 December 1855 all such water was required to be "effectually filtered". The company closed the Hammersmith site and new pumping works were established between Sunbury and Molesey Locks at Hampton. The Hampton facility was completed in 1855 and was shared with the Southwark and Vauxhall Waterworks Company and the Grand Junction Waterworks Company.

== See also ==
- London water supply infrastructure
