= National Union of Water Works Employees =

The National Union of Water Works Employees (NUWWE) was a trade union representing staff at water works in the United Kingdom.

The union was founded in 1906 as the Metropolitan Water Board Employees' Association. Initially, it had close links with the Metropolitan Water Board, the board's chair acting as its president, but this changed in 1914 when, for the first time, it put in a claim for a pay increase for its members, and it affiliated to the London Labour Party.

In 1920, the union changed its name to the "National Union of Water Works Employees", in the hope of attracting members from outside London. This proved successful, once it was part of winning a pay increase in 1923.

The union long remained outside the mainstream of the British trade union movement, but it affiliated to the Trades Union Congress in 1964. In 1972, it merged into the General and Municipal Workers' Union.
