= Stain Hill Reservoirs =

Coordinates: 51.4113°N 0.3849°W

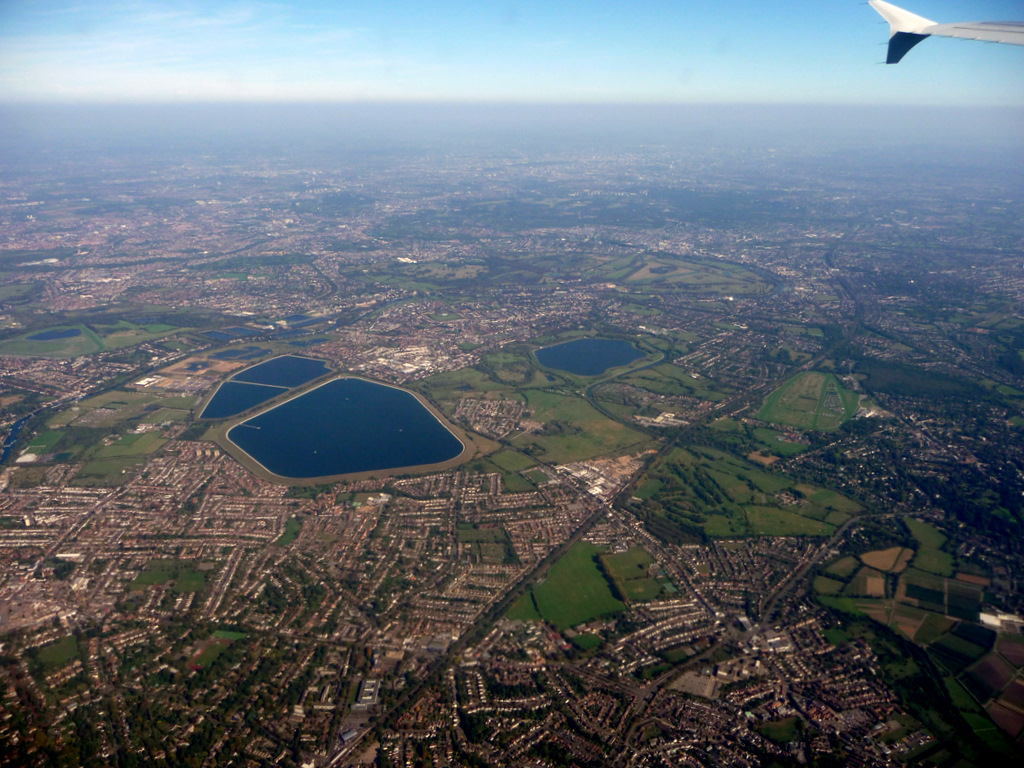
The pair of wood and grass-lined reservoirs. The Thames and adjoining trees can be traced across the foreground.

The Stain Hill Reservoirs in London, England with embankments occupy 0.175 square kilometres (43 acres). They are a pair which sit high between others; Kempton Nature Reserve; riverside houses in Sunbury-on-Thames; and a low area of flood meadow to the west alongside the closing stretch of the Port Lane (or Felthamhill) Brook. Other nearby settlements are Molesey, Hampton and Hanworth.

== History and use ==
Fifteen large Victorian houses with gardens stood on the site, including Brook House, which were demolished c. 1910. These storage lakes were built by the Southwark and Vauxhall Waterworks Company and – in use – are managed by Thames Water.

Use has changed from pre-treatment water storage to first-stage run-off settling of suspended solids from the water filter beds at the adjacent works. This unused water flows in pipes to Sunnyside Reservoir for further settlement from which pipes discharge it to a lower reach of the river Thames than from which it was taken.

== Species ==
The lakes narrowly exceed the embankments in size and have significant populations of moulting and wintering waterfowl, particularly where the water is shallow and marginal vegetation has developed. There are nationally significant numbers of shoveler and gadwall in late winter. Dry concrete upper banks support nationally-scarce "tower mustard" (arabis glabra), a UK Biodiversity Action Plan Priority species. The site's other regionally uncommon plants include:

- field mouse-ear (cerastium arvense)
- vervain (verbena officinalis)
- wild clary (salvia verbenaca).
