= Chelsea Waterworks Company =

Water company supplying London, 1723–1902

- Industry: Water supply
- Founded: 1723 in London, UK
- Defunct: June 24, 1904
- Fate: Municipalised
- Successor: Metropolitan Water Board

Chelsea Waterworks Act 1721
- Act of Parliament
- Parliament of Great Britain
- Long title: An Act for better supplying the City and Liberties of Westminster, and Parts adjacent, with Water.
- Citation: 8 Geo. 1. c. 26
- Territorial extent: Great Britain

Dates
- Royal assent: 7 March 1722
- Commencement: 19 October 1721 (Note: Start of session.)
- Repealed: 30 June 1852
Other legislation
Amended by	Chelsea Waterworks Act 1809
Repealed by	Chelsea Waterworks Act 1852

Status: Repealed

Text of statute as originally enacted

Chelsea Waterworks Act 1809
- Act of Parliament
- Parliament of the United Kingdom
- Long title: An Act for amending an Act, for better supplying the City and Liberties of Westminster, and Parts adjacent, with Water, and for enlarging the Powers thereof.
- Citation: 49 Geo. 3. c. clvii
- Territorial extent: United Kingdom

Dates
- Royal assent: 10 June 1809
- Commencement: 10 June 1809 (Note: The Acts of Parliament (Commencement) Act 1793.)
- Repealed: 30 June 1852
Other legislation
Amends	Chelsea Waterworks Act 1721
Repealed by	Chelsea Waterworks Act 1852

Status: Repealed

Text of statute as originally enacted

Chelsea Waterworks Act 1852 (Note: Section 2.)
- Act of Parliament
- Parliament of the United Kingdom
- Long title: An Act for extending the Chelsea Waterworks, and for better supplying the City of Westminster and Parts adjacent with Water.
- Citation: 15 & 16 Vict. c. clvi
- Territorial extent: United Kingdom

Dates
- Royal assent: 30 June 1852
- Commencement: 30 June 1852
Other legislation
Repeals/revokes	Chelsea Waterworks Act 1721; Chelsea Waterworks Act 1809
Amended by	Chelsea Waterworks Act 1875; Metropolitan Water Board (Charges) Act 1907; Thames Conservancy Act 1911

Status: Amended

Text of statute as originally enacted

Chelsea Waterworks Act 1864
- Act of Parliament
- Parliament of the United Kingdom
- Long title: An Act for authorizing the Governor and Company of Chelsea Waterworks to raise further Monies; and for other Purposes.
- Citation: 27 & 28 Vict. c. xxxix
- Territorial extent: United Kingdom

Dates
- Royal assent: 23 June 1864
- Commencement: 23 June 1864
Other legislation
Amended by	Chelsea Waterworks Act 1875

Status: Amended

Chelsea Waterworks Act 1875 (Note: Section 1.)
- Act of Parliament
- Parliament of the United Kingdom
- Long title: An Act for authorising the Governor and Company of Chelsea Waterworks to take water from the River Thames, in the parish of West Moulsey, in the county of Surrey, and to construct additional Works, and to raise further Moneys; and for other purposes.
- Citation: 38 & 39 Vict. c. cviii
- Territorial extent: United Kingdom

Dates
- Royal assent: 29 June 1875
- Commencement: 29 June 1875
Other legislation
Amends	Chelsea Waterworks Act 1864
Amended by	Thames Conservancy Act 1911

Status: Amended

Text of statute as originally enacted

Chelsea Waterworks Act 1887
- Act of Parliament
- Parliament of the United Kingdom
- Long title: An Act to enable the Governor and Company of Chelsea Waterworks to dispose of certain lands and for other purposes.
- Citation: 50 & 51 Vict. c. xciv
- Territorial extent: United Kingdom

Dates
- Royal assent: 5 July 1887
- Commencement: 5 July 1887

Status: Current legislation

Text of statute as originally enacted

Chelsea Waterworks Act 1896
- Act of Parliament
- Parliament of the United Kingdom
- Long title: An Act to authorise the Governor and Company of Chelsea Waterworks to lay down a New Main from West Molesey to Surbiton to construct an additional Filter Bed and other Works at Surbiton and to raise further money by debenture stock and to confer further powers upon them.
- Citation: 59 & 60 Vict. c. lxxiii
- Territorial extent: United Kingdom

Dates
- Royal assent: 2 July 1896
- Commencement: 2 July 1896

Status: Current legislation

Text of statute as originally enacted

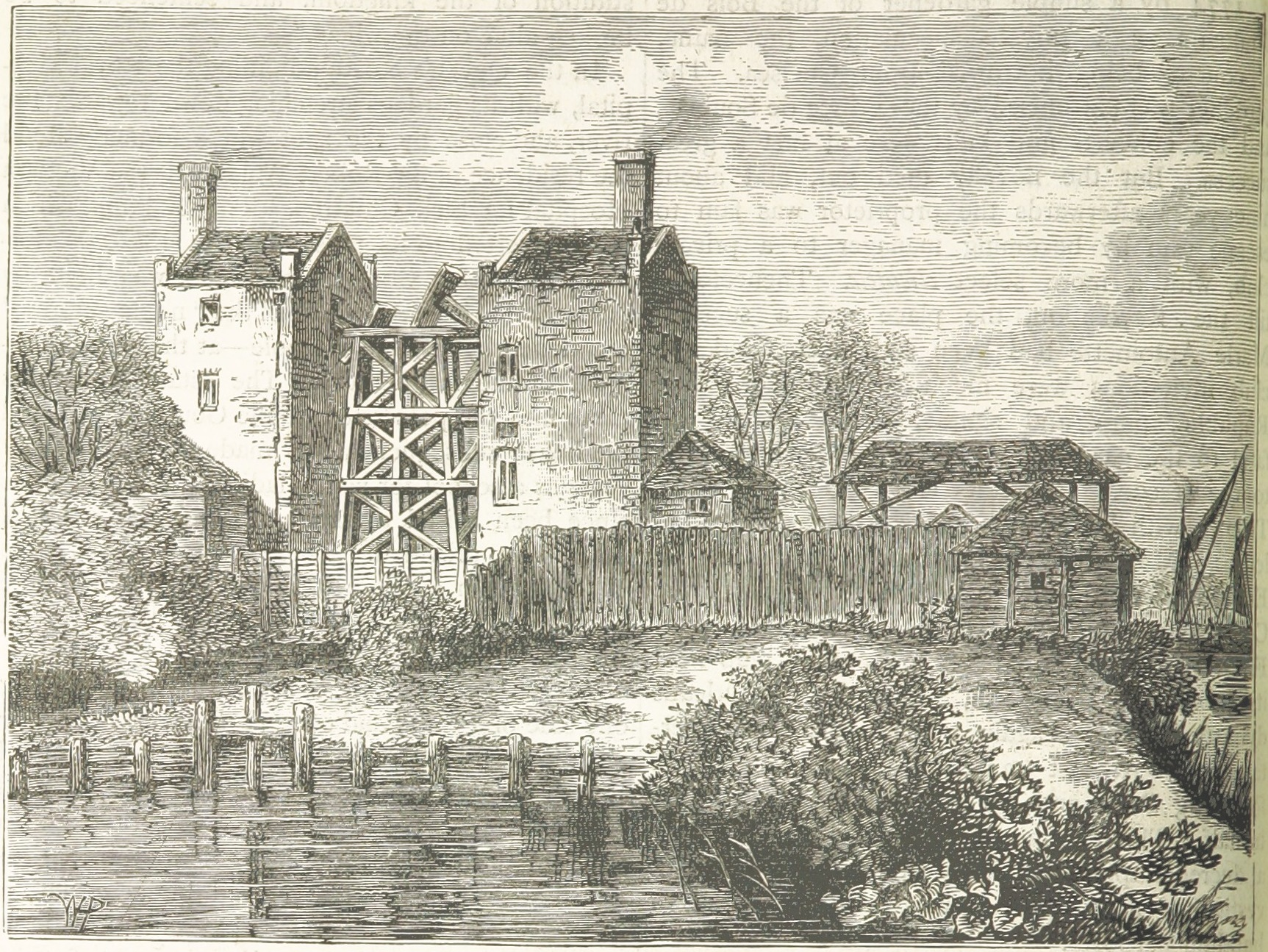
Chelsea Waterworks, 1750

The Chelsea Waterworks Company was a London waterworks company founded in 1723 which supplied water to many central London locations throughout the 18th and 19th centuries until its functions were taken over by the Metropolitan Water Board in 1904.

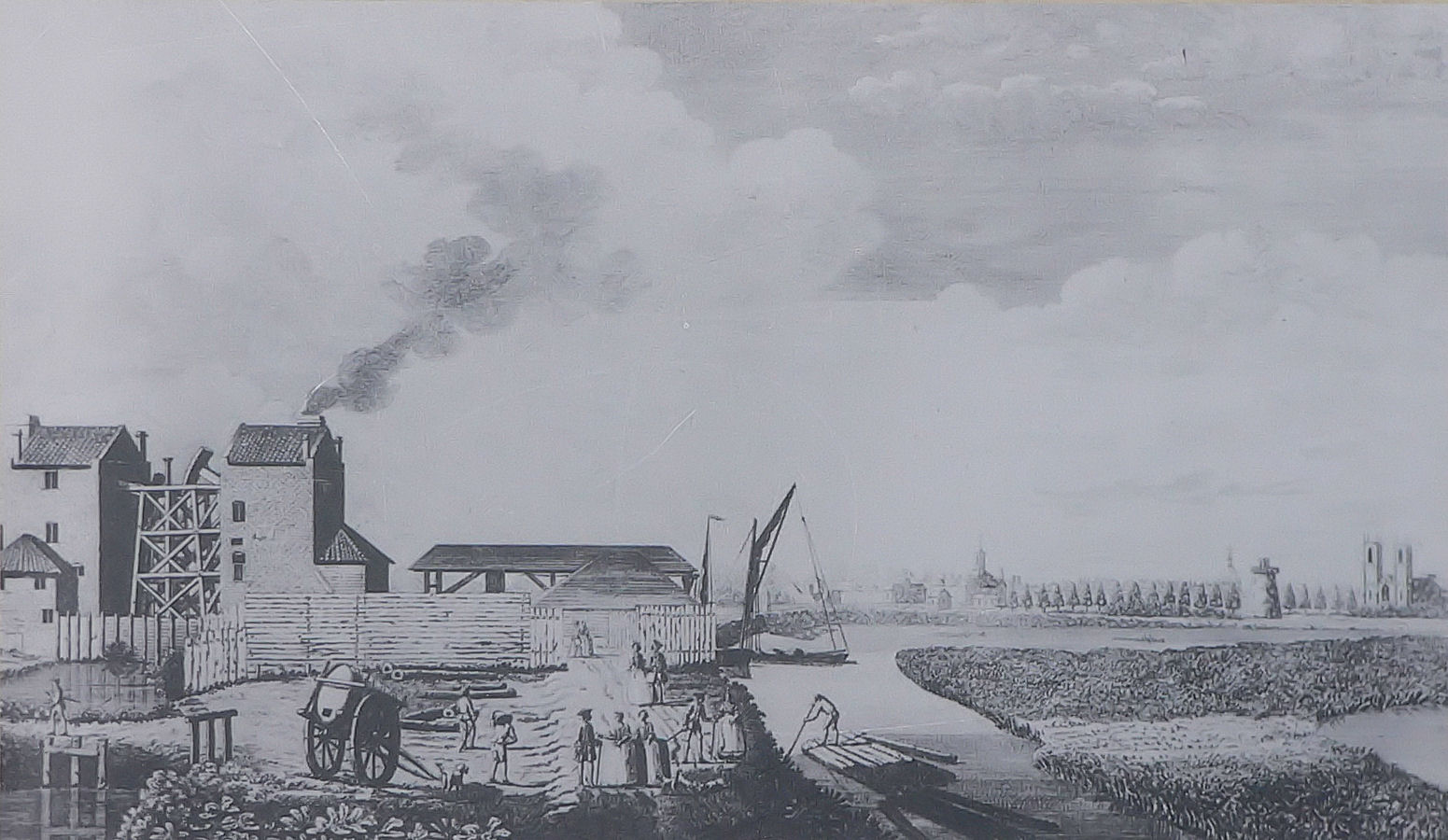
Chelsea Waterworks, 1752

The company was established "for the better supplying the City and Liberties of Westminster and parts adjacent with water" and received a royal charter on 8 March 1723. The company created extensive ponds in the area bordering Chelsea and Pimlico using water from the tidal Thames. These were to form the basis of the Grosvenor Canal which was opened to traffic in 1825. By the 19th century there were complaints about the quality of the water they were drawing from the River Thames, and in 1829, under engineer James Simpson the company became the first in the country to install a slow sand filtration system to purify the water.

The Metropolis Water Act 1852 (15 & 16 Vict. c. 84) prohibited the extraction of water for household purposes from the River Thames below Teddington Lock. The company moved to Seething Wells above the lock at Surbiton in 1856 becoming the last water company to move their inlets above the polluted tidal water zone. The site was adjacent to the Lambeth Waterworks Company, who had already moved there and who also employed Simpson. The vacated site at Pimlico was used by the railway companies to build lines into west London and London Victoria Station was built on the site of much of the Grosvenor Canal basin.

The inlets at Seething Wells sucked up too much mud with the water because of turbulence caused by the River Mole, River Ember and The Rythe. The Chelsea Waterworks Company attempted to build works opposite Hampton Court but followed the Lambeth Waterworks Company to a new installation at Molesey in 1875 where the Molesey Reservoirs were built. Both companies were incorporated into the Metropolitan Water Board in 1902.
