= Lambeth Waterworks Company =

Water supply company in London, 1785–1903

- Industry: Water supply
- Founded: 1785 in London, UK
- Defunct: June 24, 1904
- Fate: Municipalised
- Successor: Metropolitan Water Board

The Lambeth Waterworks Company was a utility company supplying water to parts of south London in England. The company was established in 1785 with works in north Lambeth and became part of the publicly owned Metropolitan Water Board in 1904.

== Origins ==
Lambeth Waterworks Act 1785
- Act of Parliament
- Parliament of Great Britain
- Long title: An Act for supplying the Inhabitants of the Parish of Lambeth, and Parts adjacent in the County of Surrey, with Water.
- Citation: 25 Geo. 3. c. 89
- Territorial extent: Great Britain

Dates
- Royal assent: 4 July 1785
- Commencement: 25 January 1785 (Note: Start of session.)
- Repealed: 9 June 1848
Other legislation
Amended by	Lambeth Waterworks Act 1834
Repealed by	Lambeth Waterworks Act 1848

Status: Repealed

Text of statute as originally enacted

The Lambeth Waterworks Company, founded by the Lambeth Waterworks Act 1785 (25 Geo. 3. c. 89) to supply water to south and west London, established premises on the south bank of the River Thames close to the present site of Hungerford Bridge where the Royal Festival Hall now stands. The company's first water-intake lay on the south side of the river, supplied directly from the river. After complaints that the water was foul, the intake was moved to the middle of the river. The Company expanded to supply Kennington in 1802 and about this time replaced its wooden pipes with iron ones.

== Infrastructure ==
Lambeth Waterworks Act 1834
- Act of Parliament
- Parliament of the United Kingdom
- Long title: An Act to alter, amend, enlarge, and extend the Powers and Provisions of an Act for enabling the Company of Proprietors of Lambeth Waterworks to supply the Inhabitants of the Parish of Lambeth and Parts adjacent in the County of Surrey with Water.
- Citation: 4 & 5 Will. 4. c. vii
- Territorial extent: United Kingdom

Dates
- Royal assent: 26 March 1834
- Commencement: 26 March 1834 (Note: The Acts of Parliament (Commencement) Act 1793.)
- Repealed: 9 June 1848
Other legislation
Amends	Lambeth Waterworks Act 1785
Repealed by	Lambeth Waterworks Act 1848

Status: Repealed

Text of statute as originally enacted

Lambeth Waterworks Act 1848
- Act of Parliament
- Parliament of the United Kingdom
- Long title: An Act to enable the Company of Proprietors of Lambeth Waterworks to construct additional Works, and for better supplying the Inhabitants of the Parish of Lambeth in the County of Surrey and other Parishes and Places with Water.
- Citation: 11 & 12 Vict. c. vii
- Territorial extent: United Kingdom

Dates
- Royal assent: 9 June 1848
- Commencement: 9 June 1848
Other legislation
Repeals/revokes	Lambeth Waterworks Act 1785; Lambeth Waterworks Act 1834
Amended by	Metropolitan Water Board (Charges) Act 1907; Thames Conservancy Act 1911
Relates to	Lambeth Waterworks Act 1871

Status: Amended

Text of statute as originally enacted

Lambeth Waterworks Act 1871 (Note: Section 1.)
- Act of Parliament
- Parliament of the United Kingdom
- Long title: An Act for empowering the Company of Proprietors of Lambeth Waterworks to execute further works, and for extending the limits within which they are authorised to supply water; and for other purposes.
- Citation: 34 & 35 Vict. c. lxxxiii
- Territorial extent: United Kingdom

Dates
- Royal assent: 29 June 1871
- Commencement: 29 June 1871
Other legislation
Amended by	Thames Conservancy Act 1911
Relates to	Lambeth Waterworks Act 1848

Status: Amended

Text of statute as originally enacted

In 1832 the company built a reservoir at Streatham Hill, and then obtained the Lambeth Waterworks Act 1834 (4 & 5 Will. 4. c. vii) to extend its area of supply. In the same year the company purchased 16 acres (65,000 m^{2}) of land in Brixton and built a reservoir and works on Brixton Hill adjacent to Brixton Prison.

Around the 1850s the quality of drinking water became a matter of public concern, and John Snow examined the state of waters in 1849. Parliament passed the Metropolis Water Act 1852 to "make provision for securing the supply to the Metropolis of pure and wholesome water". Under the act, it became unlawful for any water company to extract water for domestic use from the tidal reaches of the Thames after 31 August 1855, and from 31 December 1855 all such water was required to be "effectually filtered". The directors had already decided in 1847 to move the intake for their reservoirs to Seething Wells. The facilities were completed in 1852, and the Lambeth was joined there taking advantage of its pipes to the city by the Chelsea Waterworks Company. The facilities played a role in John Snow's statistical investigations during a cholera outbreak, the facility was further upriver than many other waterworks and hence had cleaner water, leading to fewer cholera deaths.

However the inlets pumped in too much silt with the water because of turbulence caused by the discharge (confluence) of the River Mole/Ember and The Rythe into the Thames immediately upstream. The Lambeth Waterworks Company thus moved upstream to Molesey between Sunbury and Molesey Locks, where they built the Molesey Reservoirs in 1872 and the Chelsea Waterworks Company followed them there three years later.

== See also ==
- London water supply infrastructure
