= Southwark and Vauxhall Waterworks Company =

Former water supply company in south London

- Industry: Water supply
- Predecessors: Southwark Waterworks Company; Vauxhall Waterworks Company
- Founded: 1845 in London, UK
- Defunct: June 24, 1904
- Fate: Municipalised
- Successor: Metropolitan Water Board

The Southwark and Vauxhall Waterworks Company was a utility company supplying water to parts of south London in England. The company was formed by the merger of the Southwark and Vauxhall water companies in 1845 and became part of the publicly owned Metropolitan Water Board in 1904.

== Origins ==
=== Southwark Water Company ===
Southwark Water Act 1834
- Act of Parliament
- Parliament of the United Kingdom
- Long title: An Act for belter supplying with Water the Borough of Southwark, and Parishes and Places in the County of Surrey near thereto.
- Citation: 4 & 5 Will. 4. c. lxxix
- Territorial extent: United Kingdom

Dates
- Royal assent: 25 July 1834
- Commencement: 25 July 1834 (Note: The Acts of Parliament (Commencement) Act 1793.)
- Repealed: 22 July 1852
Other legislation
| Repealed by | Southwark and Vauxhall Water Act 1852 |

Status: Repealed

Text of statute as originally enacted

The Borough Waterworks Company ("Borough" being an alternative name for Southwark) was formed in 1770, originally supplying water to a brewery and to the surrounding area which spanned the distance between London and Southwark Bridges. The adjacent area was supplied by the London Bridge Waterworks Company; but that company was dissolved in 1822, and its water supply licence was purchased by the New River Company. The Borough Waterworks Company purchased the licence from the New River Company later that same year, and it was renamed the Southwark Water Company by the Southwark Water Act 1834 (4 & 5 Will. 4. c. lxxix). The company extracted water from the River Thames using steam engines to pump it to a cistern at the top of a 60-foot-high (18 m) tower.

=== Vauxhall Water Company ===
South London Waterworks Act 1805
- Act of Parliament
- Parliament of the United Kingdom
- Long title: An Act for supplying the Inhabitants of the Parish of Saint Giles Camberwell, and Parts of the Parish of Saint Mary's Lambeth, and several other Parishes and Places in the County of Surrey, with Water.
- Citation: 45 Geo. 3. c. cxix
- Territorial extent: Great Britain

Dates
- Royal assent: 12 July 1805
- Commencement: 12 July 1805
Other legislation
| Amended by | South London Water Works Act 1813; South London Water Works Act 1834 |
| Repealed by | Southwark and Vauxhall Water Company Act 1845 |

Status: Repealed

Text of statute as originally enacted

South London Water Works Act 1834
- Act of Parliament
- Parliament of the United Kingdom
- Long title: An Act to alter, amend, enlarge, and extend the Powers and Provisions of several Acts for enabling the Company of Proprietors of the South London Waterworks to supply the Inhabitants of the Parish of Saint Giles Camberwell and Parts of the Parish of Saint Marys Lambeth, and several other Parishes and Places in the County of Surrey, with Water; and to enable the said Company to supply the Inhabitants of the several Parishes of Saint Mary Lambeth, Saint Mary Newington, Saint George the Martyr, Saint Saviour, Saint John, Saint Thomas, Saint Olave, and Christchurch, all in the said County, with Water.
- Citation: 4 & 5 Will. 4. c. lxxviii
- Territorial extent: United Kingdom

Dates
- Royal assent: 25 July 1834
- Repealed: 30 June 1845
Other legislation
| Amends | South London Waterworks Act 1805; South London Water Works Act 1813 |
| Repealed by | Southwark and Vauxhall Water Company Act 1845 |

Status: Repealed

Text of statute as originally enacted

The South London Waterworks Company (formally, The Company of Proprietors of the South London Waterworks) was established by local act of Parliament, the South London Waterworks Act 1805 (45 Geo. 3. c. cxix). The company extracted water from the Thames beside Vauxhall Bridge. In 1833 the company supplied 12,046 houses with approximately 12,000 gallons of water. In 1834, the company was renamed the Vauxhall Water Company (formally, The Vauxhall Water Works Company) by the South London Water Works Act 1834 (4 & 5 Will. 4. c. lxxviii).

== Amalgamation ==
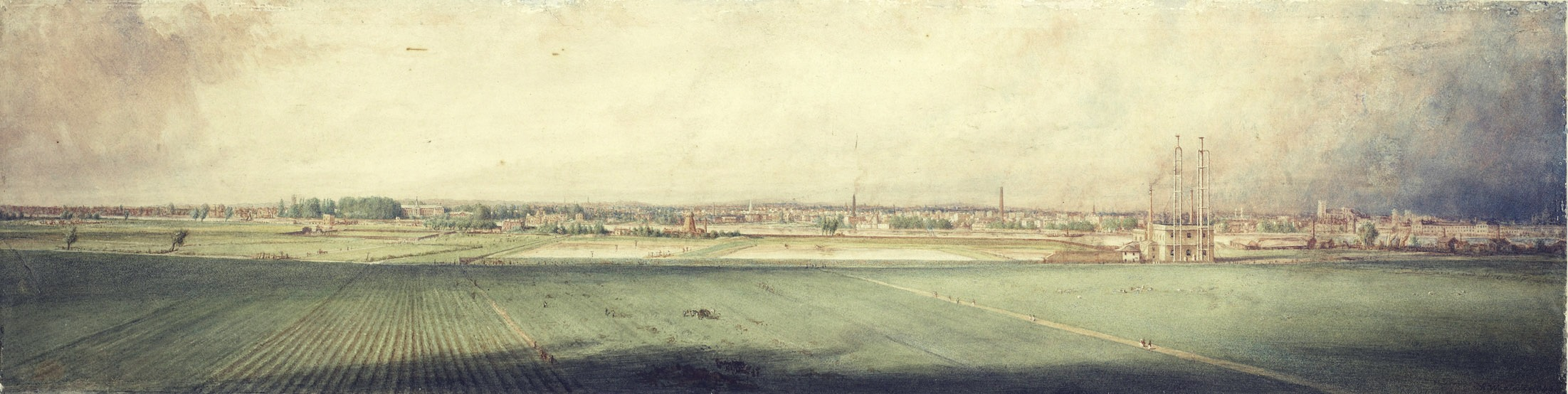
An 1848 view of the reservoirs and pumping station, seen from Battersea New Town

On 10 January 1845 the two companies submitted a memorial to the Health of Towns Commissioners proposing amalgamation. The memorial noted that since 1834 competition had increased between Southwark, Vauxhall, and Lambeth Water Companies and that the "results of that competition were as inconvenient to the public as they were disastrous to the companies, and afforded the very strongest illustration of the truth of the doctrine... that the principle of competition cannot with advantage be applied to the operations of water companies." The effect of competition on the companies was described as "an immense expenditure of capital in utter waste - double or treble sets of mains and pipes being laid down in districts where one set would better have served the inhabitants. An enormous annual outlay, equally in utter waste, in the salaries of canvassers and commission to agents, who procured tenants; in the bills of plumbers, who changed the service pipes of the tenants from one set of mains to another; in the charges of taking up and relaying roads and pavements on the like occasions; in double and treble sets of turncocks and pipe-layers; and, as the climax of absurdity, a payment of all parochial and district rates in every parish on all the pipes of all the companies, in proportion to the capital expended on assumed profits or interest, which it is needless to say had no existence."

Southwark and Vauxhall Water Company Act 1845
- Act of Parliament
- Parliament of the United Kingdom
- Long title: An Act for uniting the Vauxhall and Southwark Water Companies into One Company, to be called The Southwark and Vauxhall Water Company, and for extending the Works of the said Company.
- Citation: 8 & 9 Vict. c. lxix
- Territorial extent: United Kingdom

Dates
- Royal assent: 30 June 1845
- Commencement: 30 June 1845
- Repealed: 22 July 1852
Other legislation
| Repeals/revokes | South London Waterworks Act 1805; South London Water Works Act 1834 |
| Repealed by | Southwark and Vauxhall Water Act 1852 |

Status: Repealed

The bill promoted by the two companies successfully passed through Parliament, becoming the Southwark and Vauxhall Water Company Act 1845 (8 & 9 Vict. c. lxix) and the Southwark and Vauxhall Water Company formed later that year. The area supplied by the SVWC was centred on the Borough of Southwark, reaching east to Rotherhithe, south to Camberwell and in the west including Battersea and parts of Clapham and Lambeth.

== Infrastructure ==
Southwark and Vauxhall Water Works Reservoirs, Vauxhall, 1897.

The amalgamated company established waterworks at Battersea Fields with two depositing reservoirs with a capacity of 32 million gallons; and two filtering reservoirs holding 11 million gallons. In 1850 the company's water was described by the microbiologist Arthur Hassall as "the most disgusting which I have ever examined".

The Metropolis Water Act 1852 (15 & 16 Vict. c. 84) was enacted "to make provision for securing the supply to the Metropolis of pure and wholesome water". Under the act, it became unlawful for any water company to extract water for domestic use from the tidal reaches of the Thames after 31 August 1855, and from 31 December 1855 all such water was required to be "effectually filtered". In the meantime, an outbreak of cholera in 1854 led to the deaths of an estimated 4,267 people supplied by the company.

Southwark and Vauxhall Water Act 1852 (Note: Section 1.)
- Act of Parliament
- Parliament of the United Kingdom
- Long title: An Act for making divers Provisions with respect to the Southwark and Vauxhall Water Company, for empowering that Company to execute additional Works, and for other Purposes.
- Citation: 15 & 16 Vict. c. clviii
- Territorial extent: United Kingdom

Dates
- Royal assent: 30 June 1852
- Commencement: 22 July 1852 (Note: Section 2.)
Other legislation
| Repeals/revokes | Southwark Water Act 1834; Southwark and Vauxhall Water Company Act 1845 |
| Amended by | Southwark and Vauxhall Water Act 1855; Southwark and Vauxhall Water Act 1884; Metropolitan Water Board (Charges) Act 1907; Thames Conservancy Act 1911 |

Status: Amended

Text of statute as originally enacted

To comply with the legislation, the Southwark and Vauxhall Company built new waterworks in Hampton between Molesey and Sunbury Locks in 1855. The site was shared in a joint venture with the Grand Junction Waterworks Company and the West Middlesex Waterworks Company. The company also constructed the Stain Hill Reservoirs and a 36-inch-diameter (910 mm) direct water main to Battersea, its main network of smaller mains spreading out along the route. A third reservoir was opened later in the year between Nunhead Cemetery and Peckham Rye.

Notwithstanding this, in 1878 from contamination or low-quality filtration, this water company had substantially the worst quality of water. This may in part have been due to less used, uncovered filter beds in Battersea which were soon after 1900 made defunct. Dr. Frankland's analysis of water supplied to London during the month of October 1876 gave a relative degree of organic impurity compared to a given volume of the Kent Company's water. He also compared the samples from those of August and September. Organic impurity was measured relative to the Kent Water Company's benchmark, who supplied part of London (in areas, in direct competition with the others). The figures were:

| Competing company | Relative impurity |
|---|---|
| New River | 0.9 |
| Kent | 1 |
| East London | 2.4 |
| West Middlesex | 2.8 |
| Grand Junction | 3.3 |
| Lambeth | 4.1 |
| Chelsea | 4.2 |
| Southwark | 4.5 |

The water delivered by the latter five companies, drawing their supply exclusively from the Thames, when compared with that supplied in August and September, showed a marked deterioration in quality. It had a higher proportion of contamination with organic matter. The sample of the Southwark Company's water was poorest: "slightly turbid from insufficient filtration, and contained moving organisms".

By 1903 the SVWC supplied a population of 860,173 in 128,871 houses of which 122,728 (95.3%) had a constant supply.

== See also ==
- London water supply infrastructure
