= Metropolis Water Act 1852 =

Act of the Parliament of the United Kingdom

Metropolis Water Act 1852 (Note: Section 28.)
- Act of Parliament
- Parliament of the United Kingdom
- Long title: An Act to make better Provision respecting the Supply of Water to the Metropolis.
- Citation: 15 & 16 Vict. c. 84
- Territorial extent: United Kingdom

Dates
- Royal assent: 1 July 1852
- Commencement: 31 August 1852 (Note: Section 1.)
Other legislation
Amended by	Metropolis Water Act 1871; Statute Law Revision Act 1875; Statute Law Revision Act 1892; Metropolis Water Act 1897; Metropolis Water Act 1902; Public Health Act 1936; Water Act 2003

Status: Amended

Text of statute as originally enacted

The Metropolis Water Act 1852 (15 & 16 Vict. c. 84) is an act of the Parliament of the United Kingdom which first introduced regulation of the supply of water to London ("the Metropolis"), including minimum standards of water quality, transport and treatment, official oversight and approval of all new water sources, and the introduction of a complaints process.

Passage of the act followed an outbreak of cholera in London in 1849, and official concern regarding the level of effluent discharged into the River Thames, the main source of domestic water for London's residents.

== Provisions ==
The act sought to "make provision for securing the supply to the Metropolis of pure and wholesome water." The act provided that from 31 August 1855:

- it would be unlawful for any water company to extract water for domestic use from the River Thames below Teddington Lock, or from the tidal waters of any of the Thames' tributary streams (s.1), and
- all reservoirs and aqueducts with 5 miles of St Paul's Cathedral were to be 'roofed in or covered over', unless the water was subsequently filtered (s.2).

From 31 December 1855:

- all water for domestic use should be transported through pipes or covered aqueducts, or otherwise filtered before distribution (s.3), and
- water companies should "effectually filter" all water supplied for domestic use, unless pumped direct from wells into a covered reservoir or aqueducts 'without Exposure to the Atmosphere' or mixing with unfiltered water (s.4).

Water companies would be required to give three months' notice to the Board of Trade for approval of any new source of water supply (ss.5-8). The Board would also oversee a formal complaints process, including the appointment of investigators, the commissioning of reports, and issuing of notices. (ss.9-12).

By 1857 the water companies were required to provide 'a constant supply of pure and wholesome water sufficient for domestic use' at high pressure to at least four-fifths of the inhabitants serviced in each district (s.15).

== Response ==
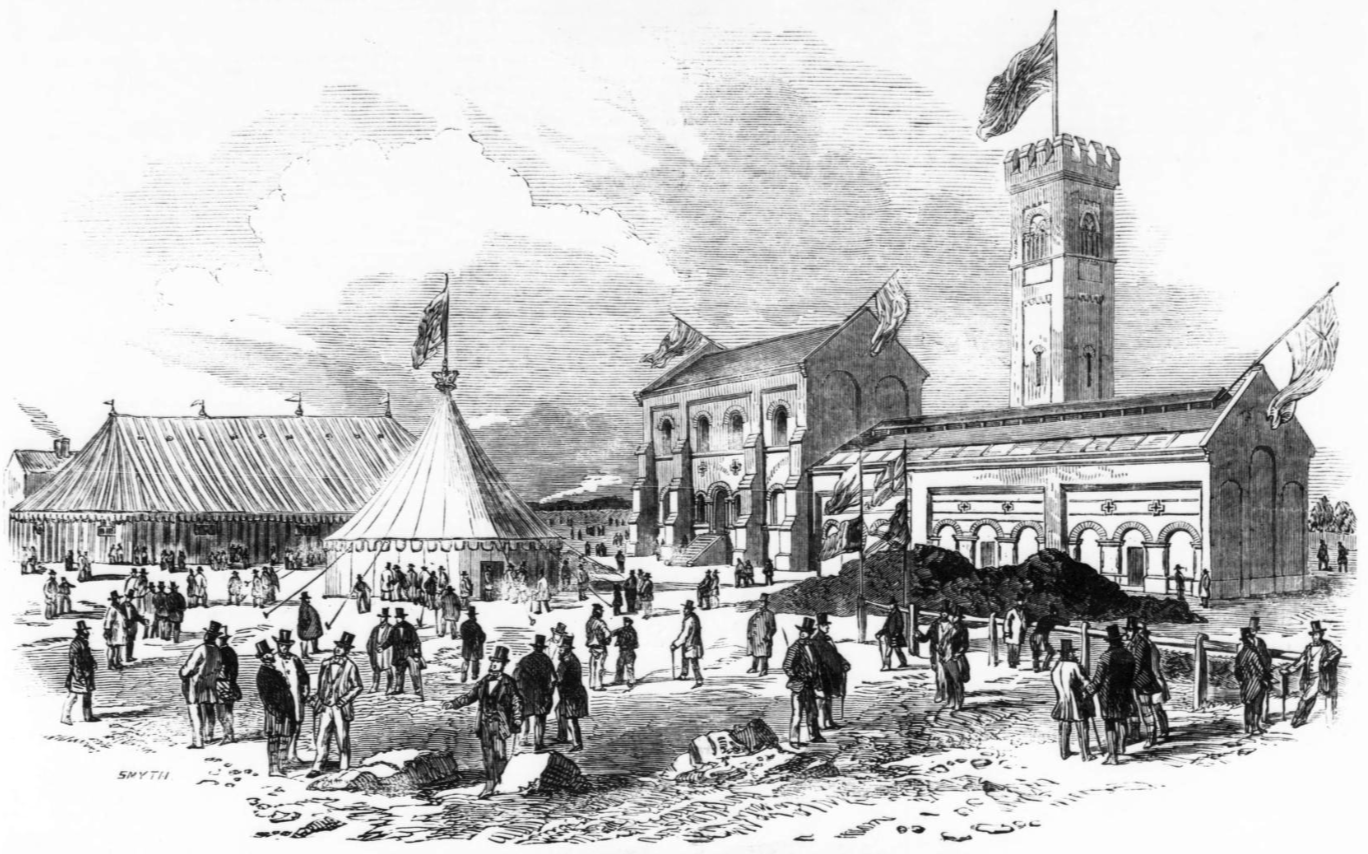
Engraving 'Opening of the New Works of the Lambeth Water Company', The Illustrated London News, 3 April 1852

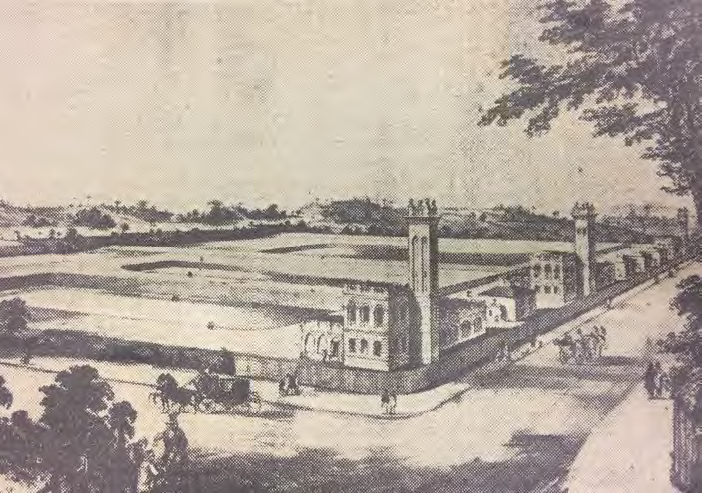
Hampton Water Treatment Works 1855

The immediate consequence of the act was the removal of all water company intakes from the Thames below Teddington Lock. The Lambeth Waterworks Company had already made the decision to move their waterworks to Seething Wells in 1847 (completed 1852), and the Chelsea Waterworks Company relocated in 1856. The West Middlesex, Grand Junction and Southwark and Vauxhall waterworks companies each constructed pump houses, intakes and reservoirs on the north bank of the Thames near Hampton in 1853–55. The East London Company removed its intake on the River Lee to Ponders End. The Kent Company abandoned its waterworks on the River Ravensbourne in 1862.

== Further acts ==
The Metropolis Water Act 1852 was followed by the Metropolis Water Act 1871 (34 & 35 Vict. c. 113), the Metropolis Water Act 1897 (60 & 61 Vict. c. 56), the Metropolis Water Act 1899, and the Metropolis Water Act 1902 (2 Edw. 7. c. 41).

Section 1 of the Metropolis Water Act 1852 was repealed by the Water Act 2003.

== See also ==
- London water supply infrastructure
