= Grand Junction Waterworks Company =

Water supply company in London 1811–1903

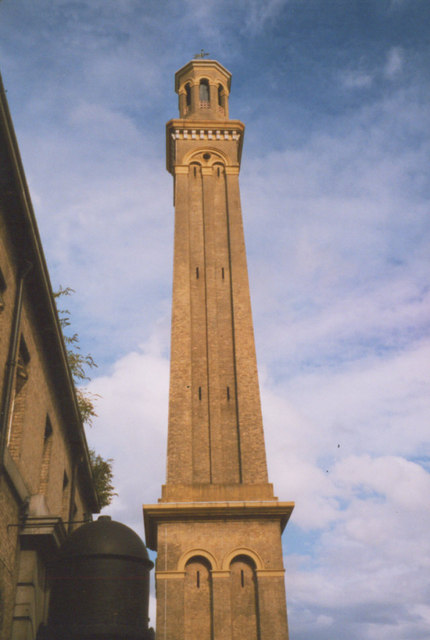
- Standpipe Tower at Brentford
- Industry: Water supply
- Founded: 1811 in London, UK
- Defunct: June 24, 1904
- Fate: Municipalised
- Successor: Metropolitan Water Board
- Headquarters: London
- Area served: England

The Grand Junction Waterworks Company was a utility company supplying water to parts of west London in England. The company was formed as an offshoot of the Grand Junction Canal Company in 1811 and became part of the publicly owned Metropolitan Water Board in 1904.

== Origins ==
The company was created in 1811 to take advantage of a clause in the Grand Junction Canal Act 1798 (38 Geo. 3. c. xxxiii) which allowed them to supply water brought by the canal from the River Colne and River Brent, and from a reservoir (now Ruislip Lido) in north-west Middlesex supplied by land drainage. It was thought that these waters would be better than those of the Thames, but in fact they were found to be of poor quality and insufficient to meet demand. After failing to mitigate these problems the company resolved to take its supply instead from the River Thames at a point near Chelsea Hospital.

to provide and ſupply with good and wholeſome Water, from and out of The Grand Junction Canal, Cuts, and Reſervoirs, or any or either of them, as ſhall be found meet and convenient for that Purpoſe ... it ſhall and may be lawful to and for the ſaid Company of Proprietors, their Succeſſors or Aſſigns, by ſuch like Ways and Means to provide and ſupply with good and wholeſome Water the Inhabitants of any other Buildings now erected or to be erected within the ſaid Pariſh of Paddington, or the Pariſhes and Streets adjacent — Section 3, Grand Junction Canal Act 1798

== Infrastructure ==
Grand Junction Waterworks Act 1878
- Act of Parliament
- Parliament of the United Kingdom
- Long title: An Act to enable the Grand Junction Waterworks Company to raise further moneys, and to amend in certain respects the Acts relating to that Company.
- Citation: 41 & 42 Vict. c. cxxxiv

Dates
- Royal assent: 4 July 1878

Text of statute as originally enacted

In 1820 the company purchased four acres of land on the river bank at Chelsea, just upriver from the intake and works of its rival, the Chelsea Waterworks Company. A pair of beam engines, installed by Boulton, Watt and Company, were used to pump water from the Thames to the company's reservoirs at Paddington (where the water was allowed to settle before being pumped onwards to the company's customers). The water quality, however, again proved unsatisfactory, being adjacent to the outfall of the Ranelagh Sewer, and in 1835 the company received parliamentary approval to move its intake further upriver to Brentford, just above Kew Bridge.

In 1838 the Grand Junction Waterworks Company built a new pumping station at Kew Bridge, which contained a new beam engine by Maudslay, Sons and Field. In 1842-3 it was joined by the two former Chelsea engines, which were removed and rebuilt there. All three engines then pumped water from the river by way of a six-and-a-half mile water main to Paddington.

In the mid-1840s a settling reservoir and two filter beds were added to the site, along with additional engines. A new storage reservoir was also built around this time, on Campden Hill near Notting Hill, capable of containing 6 million gallons.

In the 1850s, the quality of drinking water was of public concern. Charles Dickens took an interest in the topic and, in carrying out research, he visited the Kew Bridge Pumping Station in March 1850. He recorded details of his visit in his campaigning journal Household Words, in an article published in April 1850 entitled "The Troubled Water Question". The report of the epidemiologist John Snow on an outbreak of cholera pinpointed a workhouse in Soho which escaped the contagion because it was supplied by Grand Junction rather than the other local supply. The Metropolis Water Act 1852 (15 & 16 Vict. c. 84) was enacted "to make provision for securing the supply to the Metropolis of pure and wholesome water". Under the act, it became unlawful for any water company to extract water for domestic use from the tidal reaches of the Thames after 31 August 1855, and from 31 December 1855 all such water was required to be "effectually filtered". Accordingly, new waterworks had to be constructed further up river and the Grand Junction Waterworks Company was one of three companies that opened new facilities at Hampton between Molesey and Sunbury Locks in the 1850s. The company took its water from an island in the Thames that thereby acquired its present name, Grand Junction Isle.

== See also ==
- London water supply infrastructure
- London Museum of Water & Steam (the former Kew Bridge Pumping Station)
