= Metropolitan Water Board =

Public utility supplying water to London 1903–1974

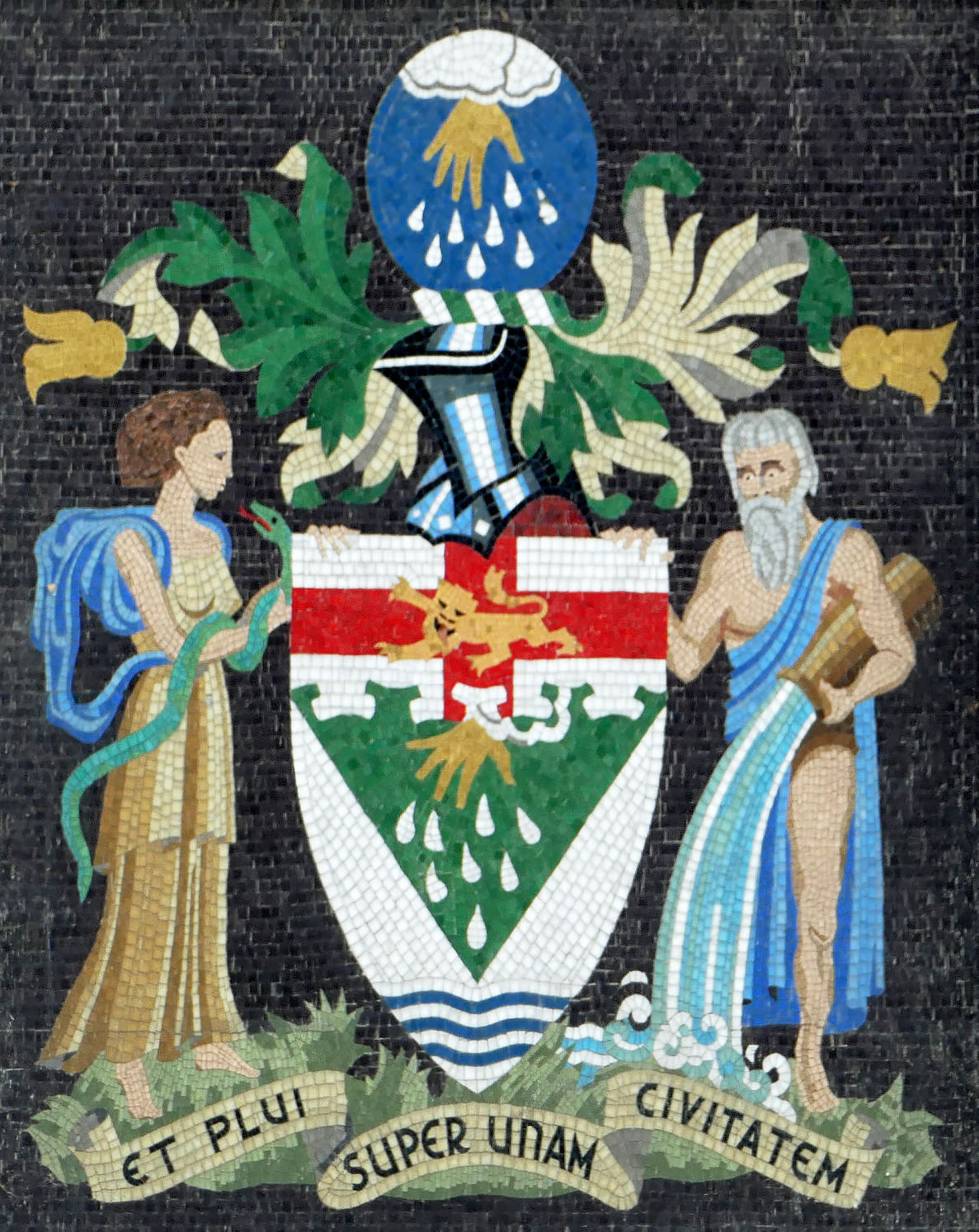
- Arms of the Metropolitan Water Board

Board overview
- Formed: 1903
- Dissolved: 1 April 1974
- Superseding board: Thames Water Authority

The Metropolitan Water Board was a municipal body formed in 1903 to manage the water supply in London, UK. The members of the board were nominated by the local authorities within its area of supply. In 1904 it took over the water supply functions from the eight private water companies which had previously supplied water to residents of London. The board oversaw a significant expansion of London's water supply infrastructure, building several new reservoirs and water treatment works.

The Metropolitan Water Board was abolished in 1974 when control was transferred to the Thames Water Authority, which was subsequently re-privatised as Thames Water.

== Background ==
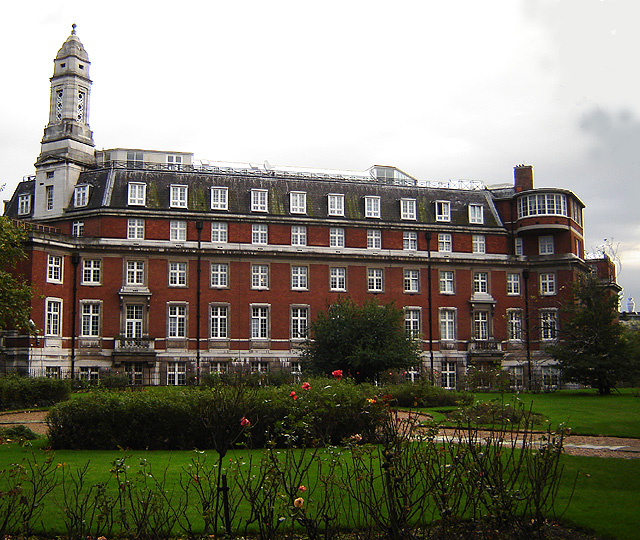
The Metropolitan Water Board's former headquarters at New River Head. Now residential (2005).

Water supply in the London area was regulated by local acts and royal charters on a piecemeal basis from 1543.

Through amalgamation, by 1830 there were six companies supplying water north of the Thames:

1. The New River Company incorporated in 1619
2. The Hampstead Water Company, incorporated around 1730
3. The Chelsea Waterworks Company, incorporated 1723
4. The West Middlesex Waterworks Company, incorporated 1806
5. The East London Waterworks Company, incorporated 1807
6. The Grand Junction Waterworks Company, incorporated 1811

and four to the south of the river

1. The Lambeth Waterworks Company, incorporated 1785
2. The Kent Waterworks Company, incorporated 1809
3. The Southwark Water Company, incorporated around 1760
4. The Vauxhall Water Company, incorporated 1805

Following complaints, a royal commission was set up in 1827 to investigate the quality of supply. The commission found that the water was of poor quality and cleanliness, and was in need of improvement. A select committee endorsed this view in 1828 and recommended that a scheme should be devised by Thomas Telford, to supply the whole metropolis with clean water. Telford reported in 1834, and despite several outbreaks of cholera, little action was taken until the Metropolis Water Act 1852 (15 & 16 Vict. c. 84) introduced regulation of the supply companies; including minimum standards of water quality for the first time. A further royal commission reported in 1869 and recommended that the supply should be taken into public management. The Metropolis Water Act 1871 (34 & 35 Vict. c. 113) introduced further regulation, but fell short of taking the supply into public control. In the meantime the corporations of major provincial towns such as Liverpool, Manchester and Leeds began operating their own municipal supplies. The Metropolitan Board of Works promoted several unsuccessful bills between 1878 and 1886 which would have allowed them to offer a municipal water supply; with a further eight bills promoted by the London County Council in 1895. During the course of a further series of commissions, set against the backdrop of continuing supply problems, the county councils of Middlesex, Essex, Kent and Surrey indicated they would not accept any scheme which allowed the London County Council authority over their areas in respect of water supply. It was therefore decided that the Metropolitan Water Bill would create an entirely new body to supply water to the greater London area.

== Formation ==
Metropolis Water Act 1902 (Note: Section 39.)
- Act of Parliament
- Parliament of the United Kingdom
- Long title: An Act for establishing a Water Board to manage the supply of Water within London and certain adjoining Districts, for transferring to the Water Board the undertakings of the Metropolitan Water Companies, and for other purposes connected therewith.
- Citation: 2 Edw. 7. c. 41
- Territorial extent: United Kingdom

Dates
- Royal assent: 18 December 1902
- Commencement: 18 December 1902 (Note: The Acts of Parliament (Commencement) Act 1793.)
Other legislation
Amends	Metropolis Water Act 1852; Metropolis Water Act 1871; Croydon Corporation Act 1884
Amended by	Local Government Act 1933; Charities Act 1960; Statute Law (Repeals) Act 1976; Statute Law (Repeals) Act 1986

Status: Partially repealed

Text of statute as originally enacted

The board was created by the provisions of the Metropolis Water Act 1902 (2 Edw. 7. c. 41). The board, which first met on 2 April 1903, had 67 members; 65 of these were nominated by local authorities, who appointed a paid chairman and vice-chairman. The nominating bodies were:

- In the County of London: 14 members nominated by the London County Council, 2 members by the City of London, 2 by the City of Westminster and 1 member by each of the remaining 27 metropolitan boroughs.
- In Essex: 1 member nominated by Essex County Council, 1 member by West Ham County Borough and 4 members nominated by 9 urban district councils.
- In Kent: 1 member nominated by Kent County Council, and 1 member jointly nominated by 8 urban district councils.
- In Middlesex: 1 member nominated by Middlesex County Council, and 6 members nominated by the borough of Ealing and 17 urban district councils.
- In Surrey: 1 member nominated by the Surrey County Council, and one nominated jointly by the Borough of Richmond and 7 urban district councils.
- In Hertfordshire: 1 member nominated by Hertfordshire County Council.
- 1 member of the Conservators of the River Thames.
- 1 member of the Lee Conservancy Board.

The first Metropolitan Water Board retired on 1 June 1907, with a new board being nominated every three years thereafter. As local government changes took place, the nominating bodies changed.

== Companies acquired ==
The board compulsorily acquired the eight major London water companies:

- The New River Company
- The East London Waterworks Company
- The Southwark and Vauxhall Waterworks Company
- The West Middlesex Waterworks Company
- The Lambeth Waterworks Company
- The Chelsea Waterworks Company
- The Grand Junction Waterworks Company
- The Kent Waterworks Company

Also acquired were the water undertakings of Tottenham and Enfield urban district councils, and the Staines Reservoirs Joint Committee. Starting in October 1903 a series of arbitration hearings was convened to determine the amount of compensation payable to the water companies. The eventual amount paid to the shareholders of the water companies was £46,939,258 (equivalent to £4.93 billion in 2025) in "water stock", which paid a 3% annual dividend for 80 years.

The Metropolitan Water Board officially took over from the private water companies on 24 June 1904, except for the New River Company which was transferred on 25 July.

== Area of the board ==
At 559 square miles (1,450 km^{2}), the board's area, or "limits of supply", was considerably larger than the 116-square-mile (300 km^{2}) administrative County of London. The limits were to be the same as the area supplied by the various undertakings acquired with the addition of the parishes of Sunbury, Middlesex and Chessington, Surrey. It comprised the entire county of London and much of Middlesex, with outer boundaries at Cheshunt in Hertfordshire, Loughton and East Ham in Essex, Dartford and Foots Cray in Kent, and Malden, Surbiton, Esher and Kingston upon Thames in Surrey. The 1911 Encyclopædia Britannica described "Water London" as "an irregular area extending from Ware in Hertfordshire to Sevenoaks in Kent, and westward as far as Ealing and Sunbury."

== Water sources and supplies ==
The Metropolitan Water Board abstracted water from the River Thames; the River Lea; from springs and wells in the Lea valley, Kent, and in the southern district; from the Hanworth gravel beds; and from Hampstead and Highgate ponds. The daily and total volume of water supplied by the MWB in 1912–13 and 1920–21 was as follows:

MWB water sources and supplies 1912–13, 1920–21 and 1934–35
Source	River Thames	River Lea	Springs and wells			Hanworth gravel beds	Hampstead and Highgate Ponds	Total
Source	River Thames	River Lea	Lea Valley	Kent	Southern district	Hanworth gravel beds	Hampstead and Highgate Ponds	Total
Year 1912–13 (million gallons)
Total volume supplied	51,366	20,607	6,738	7,538	294	299	47	86,889
Average daily supply	140.7	56.4	18.4	20.6	0.81	0.82	0.13	238.1
Per cent from each source	59.1	23.7	7.8	8.7	0.3	0.3	0.1	100.0
Year 1920–21 (million gallons)
Total volume supplied	59,458	22,335	7,195	9,754	395.3	107.5	46.5	100,292
Average daily supply	162.9	63.9	19.7	26.7	1.1	0.3	0.1	274.7
Per cent from each source	59.28	23.27	7.17	9.73	0.39	0.11	0.05	100.00
Years 1934–35 (million gallons)
Total volume supplied	64,318	12,559	7,410	9,011	507	887	18.3	94,773
Average daily supply	176.4	34.4	20.3	24.7	1.39	2.43	0.05	259.6
Per cent from each source	67.87	13.25	7.82	9.51	0.53	0.94	0.02	100.0

Note: 1 million gallons is 4546.1 m^{3}.

The Thames Conservancy placed limits on the abstraction of water. The average daily abstraction was limited to 300 million gallons per day (15.785 m^{3}/s). When the flow of the Thames over Teddington Weir was less than 170 million gallons a day (8.945 m^{3}/s) no abstraction was authorised except with the permission of the Local Government Board. If the flow was less than 140 million gallons (7.366 m^{3}/s) no abstraction was allowed. If the flow over Penton Hook weir was less than 285 million gallons a day (14.996 m^{3}/s) no abstraction above Penton Hook was allowed. The maximum abstraction from the river in any one day was limited to 1,200 million gallons (63.140 m^{3}/s).

The MWB gave a water supply to the Croydon Corporation, Richmond Corporation, Cheshunt Urban District Council, and the Hertfordshire and Essex Water Company.

MWB supplies to water undertakings outside the Board's area
Year	Croydon Corporation	Richmond Corporation	Cheshunt Urban District Council	Hertfordshire and Essex Water Company
Year	Million gallons per year			
1911–12	431.5	182.6	30.9	0.117
1912–13	426.2	187.9	26.3	0.065
1919–20	437.6	204.6	56.6	0.429
1920–21	469.1	200.7	46.5	0.515

== Final years (1965–1974) ==
Upon the reorganization of local government in Greater London in 1965, the board’s constitution was amended by the London Government Order 1965 (SI 1965/654) and from 1 November 1965 until its abolition on 1 April 1974, the board had 39 members, appointed by the constituent authorities:

The Greater London Council appointed six members, while the Common Council of the City of London, 26 of the London borough councils, the county councils of Essex, Kent, Surrey and Hertfordshire, the Thames Conservancy and the Lee Conservancy Catchment Board all appointed one member each.

While there were a number of local authorities wholly or partly within the board’s area which were not directly represented on the board, they were indirectly represented through either the Greater London Council or appropriate county council.

The term of office of members of the board was three years. The chairman and vice-chairman were elected by the board on an annual basis.

== Abolition ==
The various public water boards and local authority water undertakings in England and Wales were reorganised by the Water Act 1973. Ten large water authorities were established based on river basins and catchment areas. Accordingly, in 1974, the assets of the Metropolitan Water Board passed to the Thames Water Authority governed by a 60-person board, and covering the area from the source of the Thames in Wiltshire to the Thames Estuary.

== See also ==
- London water supply infrastructure
- National Union of Water Works Employees
