= Municipalization =

Process of transferring private assets to municipal ownership

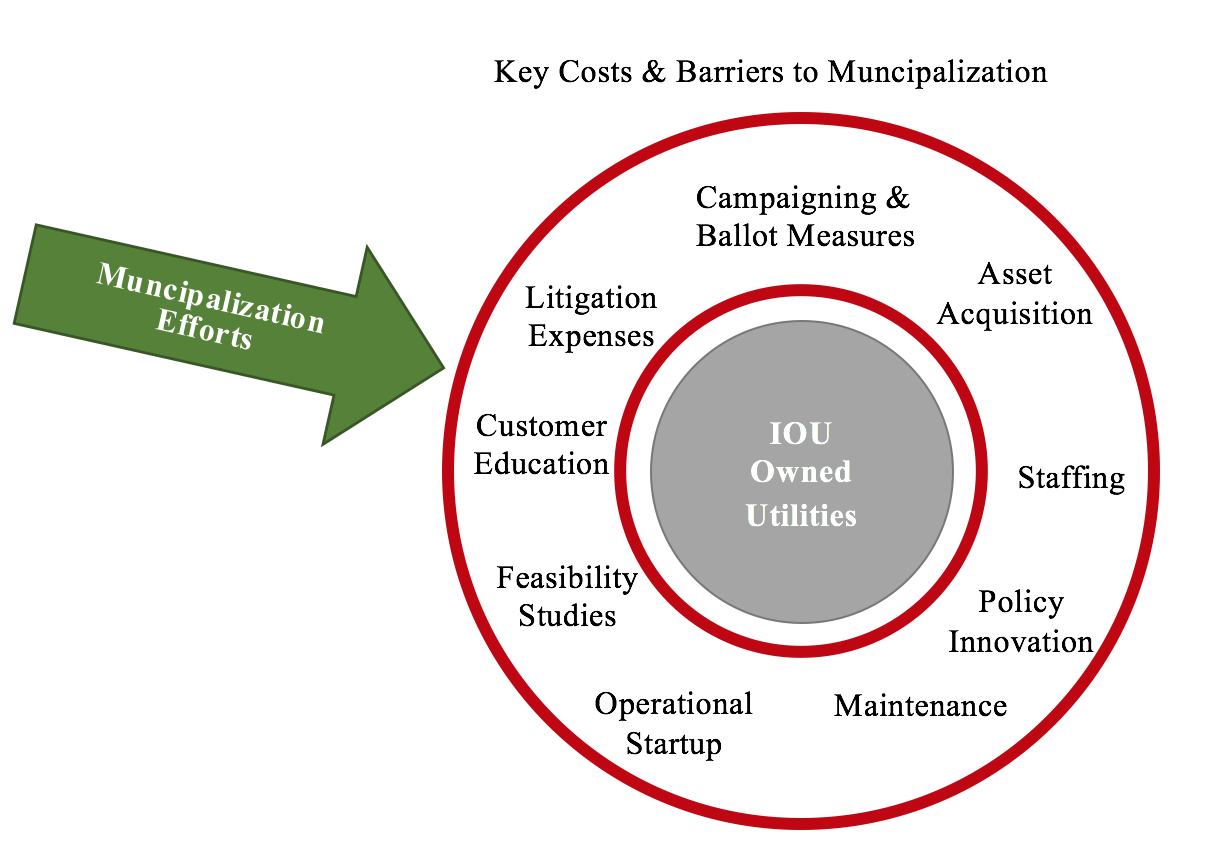
Primary barriers to municipalization

Municipalization is the transfer of private entities, assets, service providers, or corporations to public ownership by a municipality, including (but not limited to) a city, county, or public utility district ownership. The transfer may be from private ownership (usually by purchase) or from other levels of government. It is the opposite of privatization and is different from nationalization. The term municipalization largely refers to the transfer of ownership of utilities from Investor Owned Utilities (IOUs) to public ownership, and operation, by local government whether that be at the city, county or state level. While this is most often applied to electricity it can also refer to solar energy, water, sewer, trash, natural gas or other services.

Between 2006 and 2016, there have been 13 different communities in the United States that have successfully switched from an IOU to a municipal utility. Most of these communities consisted of 10,000 people or less. Although proponents of municipalization have attempted to municipalize via ballot initiatives, many have failed.

== Motivations ==
The key motivation for municipalization stems from a difference in priorities and goals of the community members and the incumbent utility. While incumbent IOUs have the objective of reliable and safe electricity that can provide a competitive profit for the investors, municipalized utilities are free from the need to provide for private profits and can focus on the pursuit of other policy goals, especially sustainability measures and experimentation with alternative energy policy. Efforts to municipalize often begin with the sentiment that the IOU is not managed primarily for the benefit of the citizens and that by undertaking municipalization of electricity services, a city government can exercise greater control over electricity generation and distribution (also often tying this process to sustainability measures). There is also a neoliberal argument stemming from the historical formation of utility conglomerates. The transition from direct current (DC) systems to alternating current (AC) systems in the early twentieth century allowed for greater access to electricity for Americans and enabled the electricity industry to shift to a larger scale. The economies of scale associated with providing a utility created natural monopolies and the associated consolidation of different types of electrical service in urban areas: street lighting, building lighting, industrial machinery, and streetcars. The recent efforts to municipalize electricity represent a return to municipalization as a mechanism to curb monopoly power and corruption. It is also important to acknowledge that the monopoly power of many incumbent utility providers means that they have strong financial and political resources to resist municipalization. Additionally there is always a legal factor with municipalization and state laws governing municipalization vary widely across the country sometimes making the process impossible.

== Services ==
There have been two main waves of municipalization in developed countries. The first took place in the late nineteenth and early twentieth century, when municipalities in many developed countries acquired local private providers of a range of public services. The driving reason in most cases was the failure of private providers to sufficiently expand service provision outside wealthy parts of urban areas.

The second wave took place in the early 1990s, when after the end of the communist states in eastern Europe state-owned companies in many public service sectors were broken up and transferred to municipal control. This was typical in sectors such as water, waste management, and public transport, although not in electricity and natural gas.

Such regional companies either remained under municipal control, or were privatized. Privatization was done variously: by selling them to investors, by giving a concession or a management contract. Examples include the water sector in the Czech Republic, over half of which has been privatized.

== Governments ==
In the United States, municipalization often refers to incorporation of an entire county into its municipalities, leaving no unincorporated areas. This generally ends de facto the county's own home rule, which in most states allows it to act as the municipal service provider in those unincorporated areas. The county is left offering only those services mandated of it by the state constitution, which are generally only extensions of state government like courts and sheriff departments. As with utilities, the county's assets usually end up being distributed among the cities, though this is less likely if the process is gradual rather than all at once.

One example of municipalization is the Sacramento Municipal Utilities District, or SMUD, of Sacramento, California. In another, larger example, Fulton County, Georgia, which includes the city of Atlanta, is currently undergoing full municipalization. For a more complete discussion of this process in the Fulton County context, see the "Politics" section of the Fulton County article.

== Examples ==
Municipalization has become quite rare in the United States over the past few decades. Of these 900 municipal-owned utility firms, only 2 percent have completed municipalization since 1990.

=== Long Island, New York ===
The Long Island Power Authority territory consists of New York's Nassau and Suffolk counties and part of Queens, New York City, including the JFK International Airport. The effort to municipalize Long Island's electricity was primarily motivated by rising prices and poor reliability.

Investor-owned Long Island Lighting Company (LILCO) was on the verge of bankruptcy catalyzing the effort to municipalize led by then Governor Mario Cuomo. Despite public support for municipalization, the effort faced strong opposition from LILCO. In 1985, the Long Island Power Authority Act passed, establishing Long Island Power Authority (LIPA). LIPA was charged with taking over the Shoreham plant and its debts, as well as controlling electricity costs. In 1998, Governor George Pataki led the effort to take over LILCO's entire system due to customers still facing high utility prices. The takeover was financed through public bond offerings and over the next few years customers experienced reduced rate. On October 29, 2012, Hurricane Sandy hit Long Island, significantly damaging the power system and causing extensive outages. LIPA faced intense criticism for its response. On July 29, 2013, in an effort led by Governor Andrew Cuomo, the LIPA Reform Act of 2013 which reorganized LIPA, placing the day-to‐day operations under PSEG was approved by the state legislature. The effort has been largely successful given that customer approval has improved to over 90 percent satisfaction level and LIPA's rates are no longer the highest in the New York Metro Area, reflecting that the key motivating factors were addressed.

=== Boulder, Colorado ===
Boulder was motivated by having greater autonomy and customer choice so that the city could more directly meet its clean energy goals. This effort was primarily motivated by sustainability concerns. In 2002, the Boulder City Council passed Resolution 906, committing the community to reducing its greenhouse gas emissions to the target established by the Kyoto Protocol. In 2005, in response to having difficulty meeting the goals of Resolution 906 and wanting more energy decision-making control, the city created a task force to explore municipalization as an option for faster innovation capacity. The feasibility study found that municipalization would increase renewable energy, reduce greenhouse gases, maintain reliability, and reduce rates for customers. The study also found that this would make the utilities more aligned with the needs of the community and would allow any excess energy revenue to be reinvested in Boulder. The study was, however, all predictive and acknowledged many uncertainties. In 2017, the City of Boulder, along with 14 other parties, signed a stipulation filed with the Public Utilities Commission, which gave the commission the opportunity to evaluate a Colorado Energy Plan Portfolio during the pending Electric Resource Plan proceeding.

The municipalization effort's most significant expenses have been from delays and regulatory roadblocks. In the last four years, Boulder has been involved in legal proceedings with Xcel at the local and state levels, and courts have ruled both in favor of and against municipalization.

=== San Francisco ===
The California energy crisis spiked public support for publicly owned and controlled municipal utilities. In the 1990s, angered by power outages and rate hikes, residents engaged in various attempts to municipalize their electricity. In 2001, two ballot propositions which would have enabled the city to municipalize its electricity faced strong opposition from the incumbent utilities. Both ballot propositions were defeated, one by a narrow margin of 500 votes. The following year, advocates tried ballot measures once more but were outspent by the incumbent utilities, which spent over $2 million.

== Cost-benefit analysis ==
=== Political/transaction costs ===
The costs of municipalization tend to be both front loaded and high. The largest costs come from the process of passing a ballot measure and acquiring the utility company. Although these many seem simple at face value these steps are often extremely costly and difficult because of the financial and political power that incumbent utilities possess. Still it is much more cost effective to purchase existing infrastructure in fact all processes of municipalization since the 1980s have purchased the incumbent utility assets. And the cost to the acquisitions has not been cheap, "most public power takeovers are in the vicinity of 140% of book value." Once the utilities have been acquired, local governments face the steep costs of financing the transition and developing the expertise to run a comprehensive system of electricity distribution as well as, in some cases, generation and transmission. The transaction costs are high, because cities must borrow to pay the IOUs for the power lines, they must develop the expertise and ability to manage a LTS, and they often face years of battles in courts and in elections due to challenges from the IOU. A study done by the Bay Area Economic Forum found that the key cost components that determine whether a new MU's rates will be higher or lower than the incumbent IOU's rates are: 1) "the combination of the income tax exemption and debt-only capital structure, both of which lower MU rates relative to IOU rates;" 2) "the premium over book paid for the distribution assets, which will increase MU rates relative to IOU rates;" and 3) "the MU's cost of generating or purchasing power, which is a wild card that could increase or decrease relative MU/IOU rates."

=== Potential benefits ===
There are, however, benefits to this process as discussed in the motivation section above. Municipal bonds "typically have lower interest rates than investor‐owned utility bonds, resulting in lower costs." Municipal utilities also do not pay dividends to investors which can help reduce costs. Additionally, "municipal utilities are exempt from federal taxes." There is also potential for Economic development benefits to occur when municipalized utilities "promote economic development in their community by offering special rates or discounted connection fees for large customers or new businesses." There are also flexibility options in complementary policies such as offer" rebates, feed-in tariffs, and other programs to support increased" distributed solar energy programs. Since "Electricity rates not only recover costs, but also provide customers with price signals that influence how customers use electricity and whether to make investments in distributed energy resources, electric vehicles, or other technologies," there are potential sustainability benefits to having increased control over electricity pricing. One example of such pricing is the introduction of time varying rates which are designed to reduce peak demand they are a type of demand response policy. Time‐varying rates can have considerable impact by "encouraging many customers to make small adjustments to the timing of their energy consumption, resulting in a flatter load curve for the entire system."

=== Potential downfalls ===
According to a report on municipalization prepared for the District of Columbia:

On the other hand, municipal utilities face challenges that can result in higher costs. The acquisition cost for the municipalized infrastructure was in some cases significantly higher than what was being recovered by the IOU, putting immediate and long‐lasting upward pressure on rates. Operationally, IOUs often have economies of scale that can lead to lower legal, management, and purchasing costs per unit of energy. Municipal utilities are not typically monitored closely by a public service commission, and inadequate auditing can allow poor utility practices to continue unchecked. Finally, the incumbent IOUs had a single, focused objective: safe, reliable power at least cost. Municipal utilities, on the other hand, also focused on the pursuit of other policy goals, which can result in higher electricity costs.

== Alternatives to municipalization ==
Collective Private Ownership: This refers to communities coming together to take collective ownership of a utility. One example is the community shares program used in Ellensburg, Washington. In this case electricity customers may buy shares in a solar field which was initially financed through the public utility and in turn receive a proportional rebate applied through their electricity billing. Customers also have the option of selling or giving away their shares to non profits or other customers.

Privatization: A process by which the for-profit private sector supplants the public sector's provision of goods and/or services. There are a number of methods of privatization including the transfer of ownership from public to private entities, the displacement of public spending by private financing, or private entities assuming management and operational responsibilities of public services.

Nationalization: Nationalization is a similar process to municipalization but shifts ownership and operational control towards the government at a national or federal level. There is often an assumed tradeoff between the promised equality under nationalization and the promised efficiency of privatization.
