= Walton water treatment works =

- Industrial sector(s): Utilities (water supply)
- Main technologies or sub-processes: Rapid and slow sand filters, flocculation, dissolved air flotation, chlorination, ozonation, activated carbon filtration
- Feedstock: Raw water
- Product(s): Potable water
- Leading companies: Metropolitan Water Board (1902-1974), Thames Water Authority (1974-89), Thames Water (1989-date)
- Main facilities: Water purification
- Inventor: Henry Stilgoe (engineering)
- Year of invention: 1907-date

The Walton water treatment works are an advanced purification works supplied with raw water and producing and delivering potable water to the locality and into the Thames Water ring main. The Walton water treatment works were initially built in 1907 north of the Bessborough and Knight reservoirs which supply the water works.

== History ==
Walton water works (51°24′20″N 0°23′58″W) were built in conjunction with the Knight and Bessborough reservoirs, and was commissioned in 1907. The treatment in 1907 comprised slow sand filters. Workers laying sand in a sand filter bed in 1909 are shown in an image in the Thames Water Archives.

=== Treatment plant 1925 ===
To meet growing demand a large self-contained double filtration plant was built at the Walton works in 1925. This was designed by the Metropolitan Water Board’s Chief Engineer Henry E. Stilgoe (1867-1943). The Walton plant followed a smaller plant constructed at Barn Elms water works in 1922. Raw water from the Knight and Bessborough reservoirs was passed rapidly through the primary filter beds containing coarse sand to remove suspended solids. Filtered water then flowed to the main filters. The main filters consisted of a tank about a 0.5 ha in area, with a depth of about 3 m. They were constructed of concrete and brick with a floor of perforated tiles forming a network of under-drains leading to the main collecting drains. Above the tiles was a 30 cm layer of gravel, with the coarser material at the bottom, and above that a 60 cm layer of fine sand. The water percolates through the sand at a rate of 10 cm an hour, gradually leaving a fine film of sediment.

The rapid primary filters were cleaned by an upward passage of compressed air and clean water. The compressed air broke up the surface deposit, and the water carried it away. To clean the main filter beds all the water was drained out, and the layer of sediment, with some 2 cm of sand under it, was scraped off manually. This is passed to a sand washer, where a flow of running water breaks up and separates the material, leaving the sand clean and ready for further use.

Following successful operation at Walton, similar two stage filtration plants were built at Kempton Park and Stoke Newington.

The layout of the works in 1926 are shown in a series of ‘Britain from Above’ aerial images.

=== Other facilities ===
A riverside wharf was located at Walton water works for unloading coal and sand from barges. There was an electric crane with a capacity of 2 tonnes and a radius of 13.6 m.

By 1933 the works comprised six slow sand filters each 220 ft by 170 ft (67 m by 52 m) located west of the reservoir intake channel, and rapid gravity to the east of the channel.

Further plant was built as the demand for water grew. More filter beds were added in 1950 west of the pump house. When the Queen Elizabeth II reservoir was commissioned in 1962 it also supplied raw water to the Walton treatment works.

By the 1980s the treatment facilities still comprised rapid gravity filters followed by slow sand filters. The plant had a maximum treatment capacity of 135 Ml/day.

== New water treatments ==
Seasonal algal growth in the reservoirs led to problems with the primary filters at the water treatment works. Algae reduced the run time of the filters to just a few hours before backwashing was required. One technique to deal with the problem was to use Co-current Dissolved Air Flotation. This entailed the addition of ferric sulphate to the water stream to create a floc in a reaction with the moderately hard water which captured suspended solids such as algae. This was followed by dissolved air flotation which caused the floc/algae to rise and which was removed mechanically. The disadvantages of the process were the 20-30 minutes of flocculation time required which increase the footprint of the plant and the energy cost of mechanical flocculation and sludge scraping.

In 1990 a pilot plant was installed to improve the water treatment at times of high algal growth. The plant used a combination of ozoflotation with filtration. It proved to be successful in treating algal growth which causes taste and odour problems. The success led to the construction of a larger scale plant at Kempton Park water treatment works.

In 1992 Thames Water installed a 1.4 Ml/day pilot plant at Kempton Water Treatment Centre. This comprised a system based on Counter Current Dissolved Air Flotation and Filtration (CoCo-DAFF). After ferric sulphate dosing the water entered a baffled hydraulic flocculator with 7 – 17 passes and a contact time of about 15 minutes. The water then entered the top of the filter vessel and flowed down through an upwards flow of fine bubbles forming a deep air blanket to capture suspended solids. Water flowed down through a dual media filter at the base of the vessel. The air blanket was formed by recycling water saturated with compressed air injected through a ‘Thames DAF nozzle’ located at about half of the vessels height.

== Current plant ==
The pilot plant was successful and a full scale 200 Ml/day plant was constructed in the late 1990s at the Walton advanced water treatment works using the CoCoDAFF system. This comprised two flocculators each providing a nominal 15 minutes of hydraulic flocculation. Water is then fed to 12 CoCoDAFF units with a capacity of 10 m/h. The filters are dual media units with 600 mm of sand (0.6–1.18 mm) upon 600 mm of (No.2) anthracite. The filters are washed with an air/water mixture. After treatment in the CoCoDAFF water passes through post-ozone and granular activated carbon (GAC) contactors then through slow sand filters before disinfection where sodium hypochlorite is introduced to contact tanks. The water processing stages are summarised in the following table.

Walton advanced water treatment plant – processes
Plant	Material addition	Residence time (minutes)
Pre-ozone contactor	Ozone	30–60
Static flocculation	Coagulants	5
CoCoDAFF	Air	30
Main ozone contactors	Ozone	15–20
Granular Activated Carbon	–	20
Screens	–	–
Disinfectant contact tank	Sodium hypochlorite	30

When the feed water quality is good the flocculators are bypassed and the CoCoDAFF units are operated in contact filtration mode.

After the disinfectant contact tank water is then pumped to the distribution system. Walton it is one of five water treatment works that supply the Thames Water Ring Main.

== Other developments ==
The reservoirs to the east of the works were abandoned and used for gravel extractions. They are now the Molesey Reservoirs Nature Reserve.

The Eels (England and Wales) Regulations 2009 (SI 2009/3344) aims to protect and conserve the population of eels in the rivers of England and Wales. The abstraction point for Walton Advanced Water Treatment Works removed a maximum of 900 Ml/d of water from the Thames. Thames Water was required to undertake the Walton Eel Screens Project to prevent eels and elvers being drawn into the abstraction works. The screens were installed in 2016–17.

The former filter beds were decommissioned. The site currently has an array of solar panels.

== See also ==
- London water supply infrastructure
- Coppermill stream
