= Molesey Reservoirs =

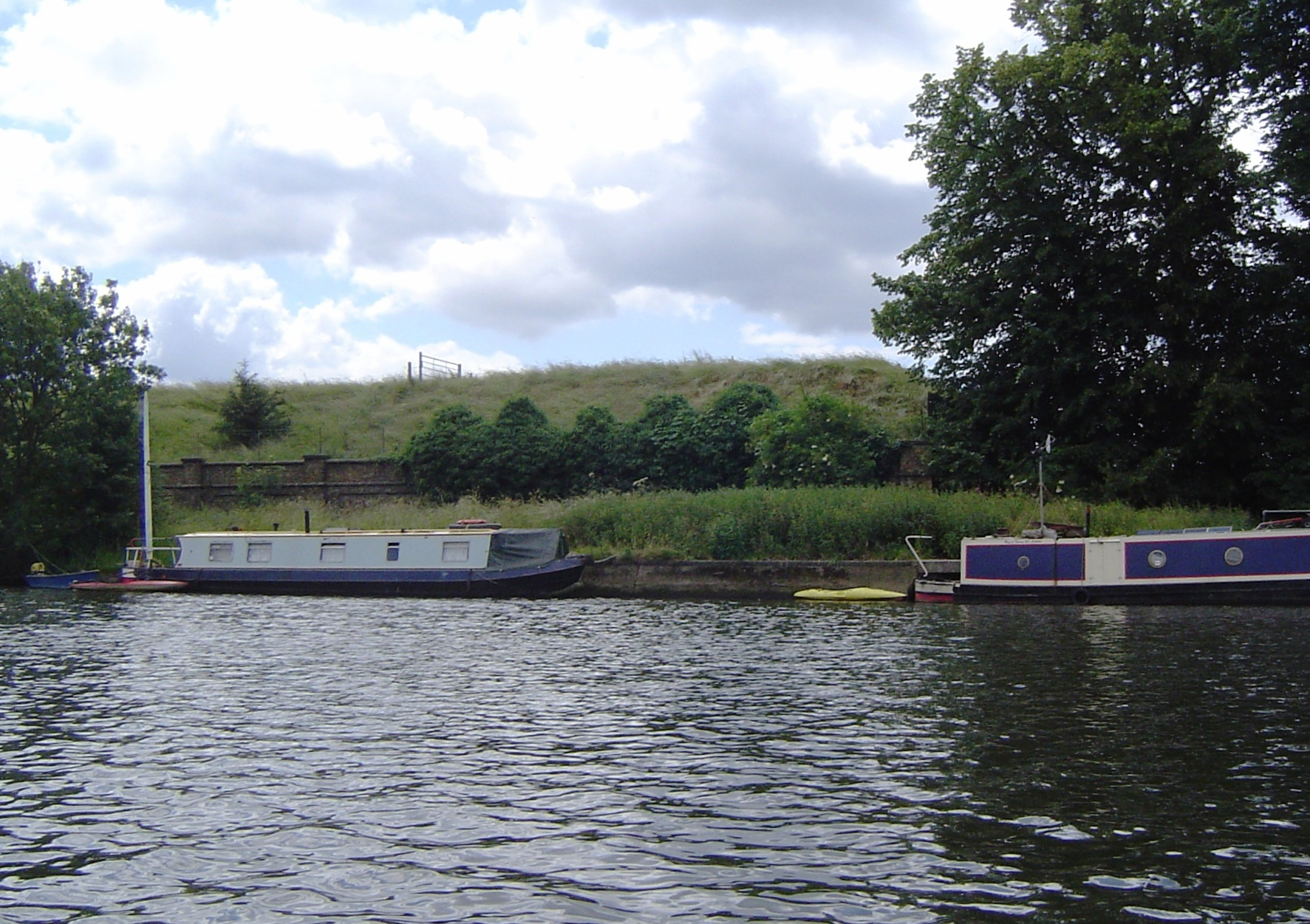
- Interactive map of Molesey Reservoirs
- Location: Molesey, Surrey, England
- Coordinates: 51°24′25″N 0°23′19″W
- Type: Reservoirs
- Primary inflows: River Thames
- Basin countries: England

The Molesey Reservoirs were a group of reservoirs in England near Molesey, Surrey, in the western suburbs of London. There was an adjacent water treatment works.

The reservoirs were adjacent to the River Thames on the south side on the reach above Molesey Lock. They are between the river and the A3050 (Hurst Road). On the other side of this road are the neighbouring Bessborough Reservoir and Knight Reservoir, and beyond these the Queen Elizabeth II Reservoir.

The reservoirs were established in 1872 (154 years ago), by the Lambeth Waterworks Company and three years later by the Chelsea Waterworks Company. Both companies had previously built their reservoirs nearby at Seething Wells in Surbiton, but they sucked up too much mud with the water because of turbulence caused by the River Mole, River Ember and The Rythe. They had pumping stations at Molesey to lift the water from the Thames into the reservoirs and there were concrete wharves on the river bank at which to unload coal to power the steam engines. Only the wharves remain by the riverside, being used for overnight mooring of pleasure cruisers.

The reservoirs were taken out of use in 1999 (27 years ago). The land was then used for the extraction of aggregates, and after the work is complete, it will be converted into a wetland reserve.

== See also ==
- London water supply infrastructure
