= Ashford Common water treatment works =

Ashford Common water treatment works is located in Ashford Surrey and supplies potable water to west London via the local distribution network and the Thames Water ring main. The works were constructed in the 1950s, and were modernised in the 1990s to increase the output.

== History ==
In the immediate post second world war period it was envisaged the demand for water in London would increase significantly. In 1947 the Metropolitan Water Board proposed to construct a new water treatment works between Ashford and Sunbury-on-Thames, Surrey, (51.41772°N 0.43802°W). The works would draw water from the adjacent Queen Mary Reservoir through a tunnel 100-inches (2.54 metres) diameter or from the Staines Reservoir Aqueduct. Water is transferred through the Ashford Common tunnel. The tunnel is 1,882.6 feet (573.8 metres) long and 8 foot 4 inches (2.53 metres) in diameter. It is at depth of 46-48 feet (14.02-14.63 m) below datum and is driven through in London clay. The tunnel is fed with water through the West shaft adjacent to the reservoir and water is supplied via the tunnel’s East shaft to the inlet of the treatment works. The hydraulic gradient is 70-74 feet (21.34-22.55 m). The tunnel was designed to carry 200 million gallons per day (909,218 m^{3} per day). Tunneling began in January 1952 and was completed in May 1952. The first fill of the tunnel was in March 1953.

The plant and treatment processes would comprise: aeration of the feed water, fine screen filtration to remove algae, slow sand filtration, granular carbon treatment, sterilization and contact tanks. Rotating screens were identified as the most effective primary filtration for algal removal.

By 1953 the Ashford Common works were under construction. There were 24 micro-strainers and 32 slow sand filter beds each of about ¾ of an acre (3345 m^{2}). The slow sand filters were cleaned on a 25 to 30 day cycle. This entailed skimming off the top 25 to 40 mm of sand which was cleaned and returned. The plan also comprised two aeration basins, a chemical treatment plan, two contact and balancing tanks and high and low lifting pumps. The plant was designed as two parallel plants so the one half could be closed for maintenance while maintaining the majority of the demand in the other side. The works were fully commissioned in 1958. The total treatment capacity was 108 million US gallons per day (409 Ml/d). The peak output was 480 Ml/d, higher flows up to 550 Ml/d were possible but significantly increased the frequency of filter cleaning.

== Modernisation ==
The Ashford Common water works operated effectively for four decades. In the early 1990s the projected increase in demand for water was met by increasing the hydraulic capacity of Coppermills, Hampton and Ashford Common water treatment works.

The facilities at Ashford Common comprised:

- Stored water pumps from Queen Mary and Wraysbury reservoirs, 730 Ml/d
- Pre Ozonisation (5 minutes contact)
- Rapid gravity primary filters, dual media, air scour and water backwash
- Main Ozonisation (16 minutes contact)
- Slow sand filters with granular activated carbon sandwich (300 mm lower sand, 135 mm GAC, 420 upper sand)
- Low lift pumps
- Hypochlorite dosing
- Contact tank screens 400 μm mesh
- Chlorine contact tank
- Hypochlorite, Sodium bisulfite and Ammonia dosing
- High lift pumps
- Water distribution and supply

Subsidiary plant included Ozone generation, washwater treatment plant, and SCADA to monitor and control the flow of water.

With all these facilities operational the peak supply increased from 480 Ml/d to 690 Ml/d.

== See also ==
- London water supply infrastructure
