= Island Barn Reservoir =

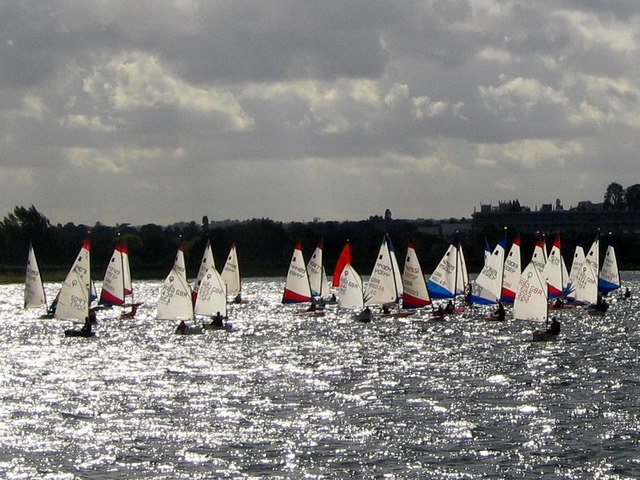
- Sailing on Island Barn Reservoir

- Location within Surrey
- Location: Elmbridge, Surrey
- Coordinates: 51°23′26″N 0°21′48″W
- Type: reservoir
- Basin countries: United Kingdom
- Surface area: 0.49 km^{2} (122 acres)
- Average depth: 25 m (80 ft)
- Water volume: 4.5 Gl (0.99×10^{9} imp gal)

The Island Barn Reservoir lies south of the River Thames in England at West Molesey and north of Lower Green, Esher. The reservoir has a surface area of 122 acres (0.49 km^{2}) and a capacity of 922 million gallons. Managed by Thames Water, it is in the Borough of Elmbridge and is surrounded by the River Mole to the west and the River Ember to the east. Queen Elizabeth II Reservoir is a larger reservoir to the West.

== History ==
Island Barn Reservoir was authorized by the Lambeth Water Act 1900 (63 & 64 Vict. c. cxli). It was built by Sir Robert McAlpine for the Metropolitan Water Board, and opened in 1911. The contract was valued at £152,727.

The reservoir was named after Island Barn Farm, which previously existed on the site, and was completely surrounded by the rivers Ember and Mole.

=== Construction ===
The embankment walls have a puddle clay core extending down through a gravel layer to the underlying blue London clay. The outside face of the embankment is grassed, the inner face is lined with concrete slabs.

The key dimensions of the Island Barn reservoir are as follows. (Note: There are differences in the data from the various sources)

Parameter	Value
Capacity	922 million gallons (4,091 Ml)
Surface area	121 acres (49 ha)
Perimeter	1 mile 1,200 yards (2,707 m)
Base to top of bank	35 ft (10.7 m)
Base to top water level	30 ft (9.1 m)
Height of bank	24 ft to 34 ft (7.3 to 10.4 m)
Depth of puddle core	15 ft to 25 ft (4.57 to 7.62 m)
Embankment volume	1.27 million tonnes
Maximum height of water	17.59 m AOD

== Operation ==
Raw water, from the River Thames, is pumped 2.7 km through a 54 inch (1.34 m) diameter pipeline from the pump house at Walton Water Works adjacent to the Knight reservoir. The reservoir can also be filled by gravity from the Bessborough and Knight reservoirs.

The reservoir allows some settlement of suspended solids; biological cleaning through exposure to sunlight; and provides a buffer storage volume to maintain capacity at times of low flow in the river.

Water is supplied to the Surbiton water treatment works.

For several years leakage through the embankment had been observed. A survey identified three areas of leakage. In 2017 interlocking sheet piling 18.5 m long was driven vertically through the centre of the embankment into the London clay to stop the leakage.

Between 1992 and 1998 1.3 million tonnes of gravel were removed from the base of the reservoir.

== Sailing Club ==
Island Barn Reservoir Sailing Club hosts dinghy sailing races and training at the reservoir. Among many successful current and past members has been Fireball world champion and ISO designer John Caig and British Olympic, European Champion and World Cup sailor Nicola Groves.

The reservoir is a bird watching site and Black-necked grebes have been sighted here.

== Gallery ==
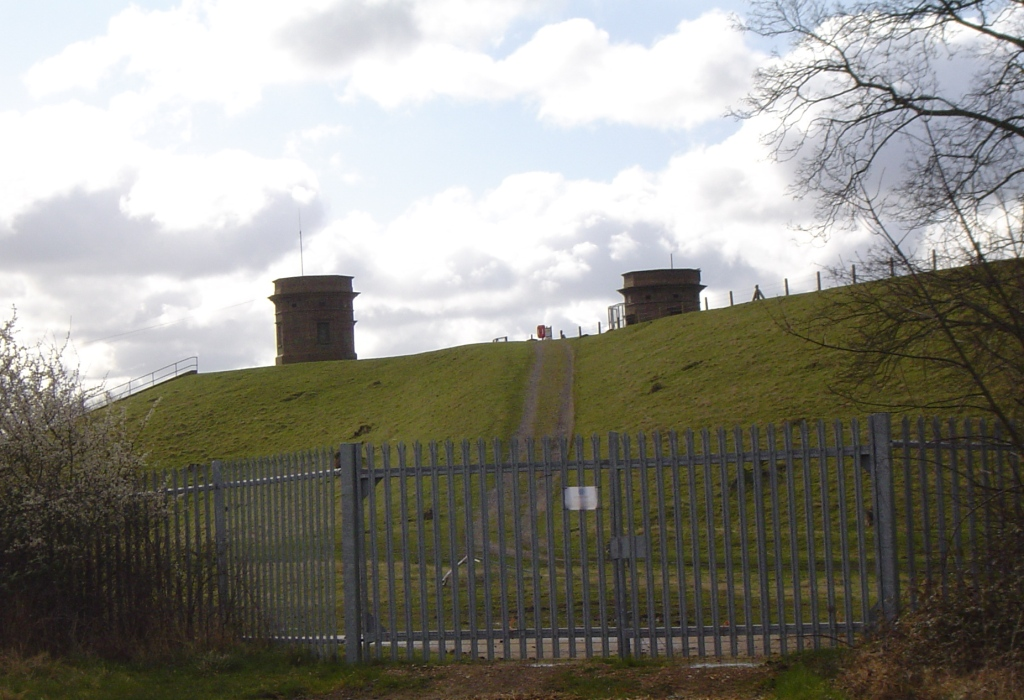
Outlet towers at Island Barn Reservoir

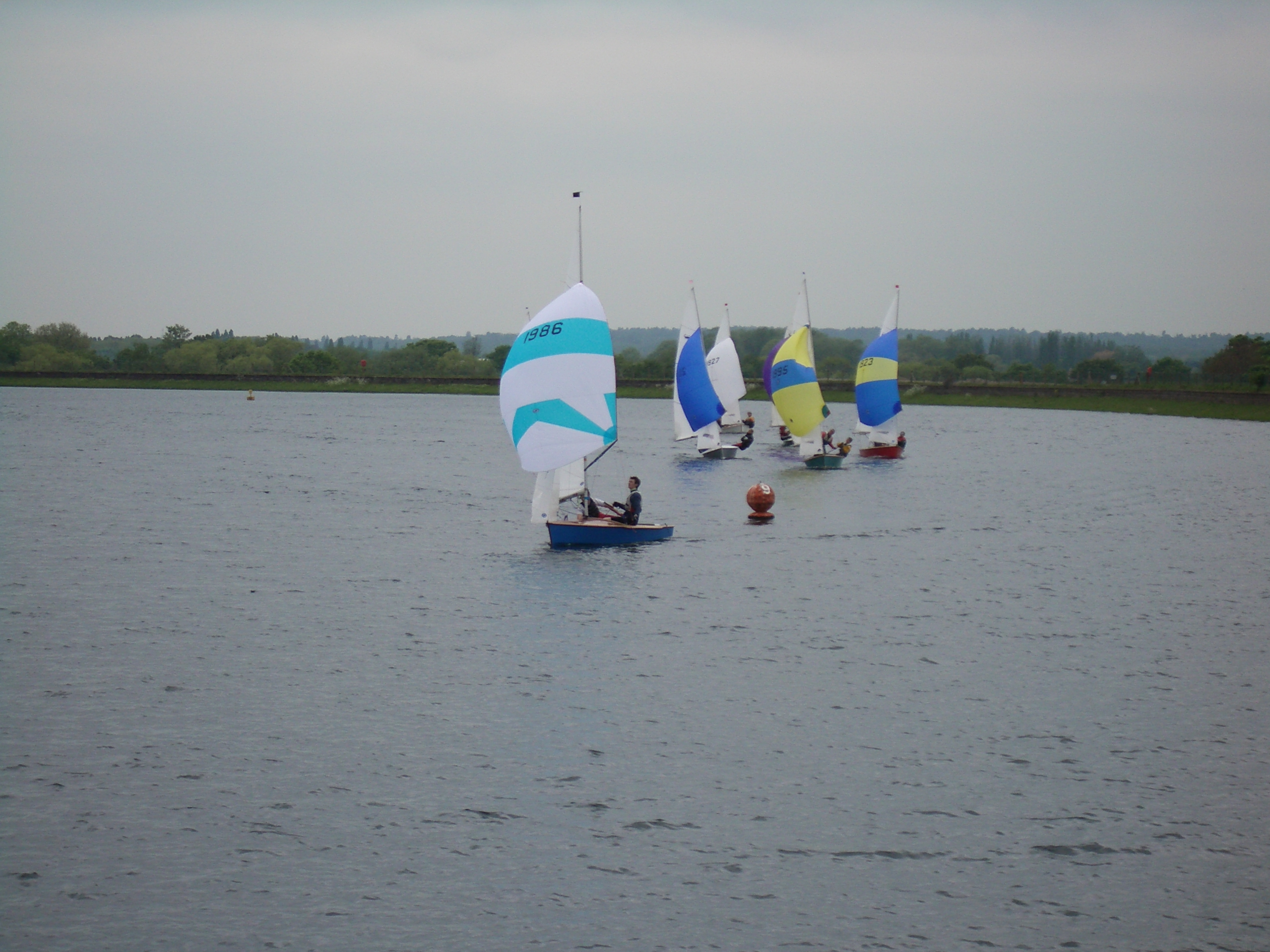
Interior from the Sailing Club

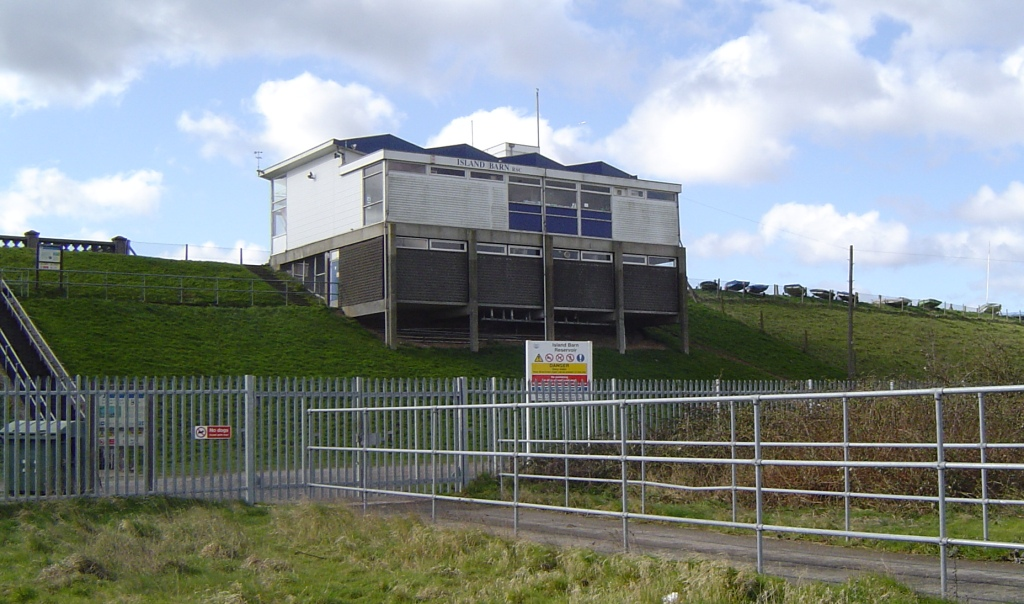
Island Barn Sailing Club building

== See also ==
- London water supply infrastructure
