= London water supply infrastructure =

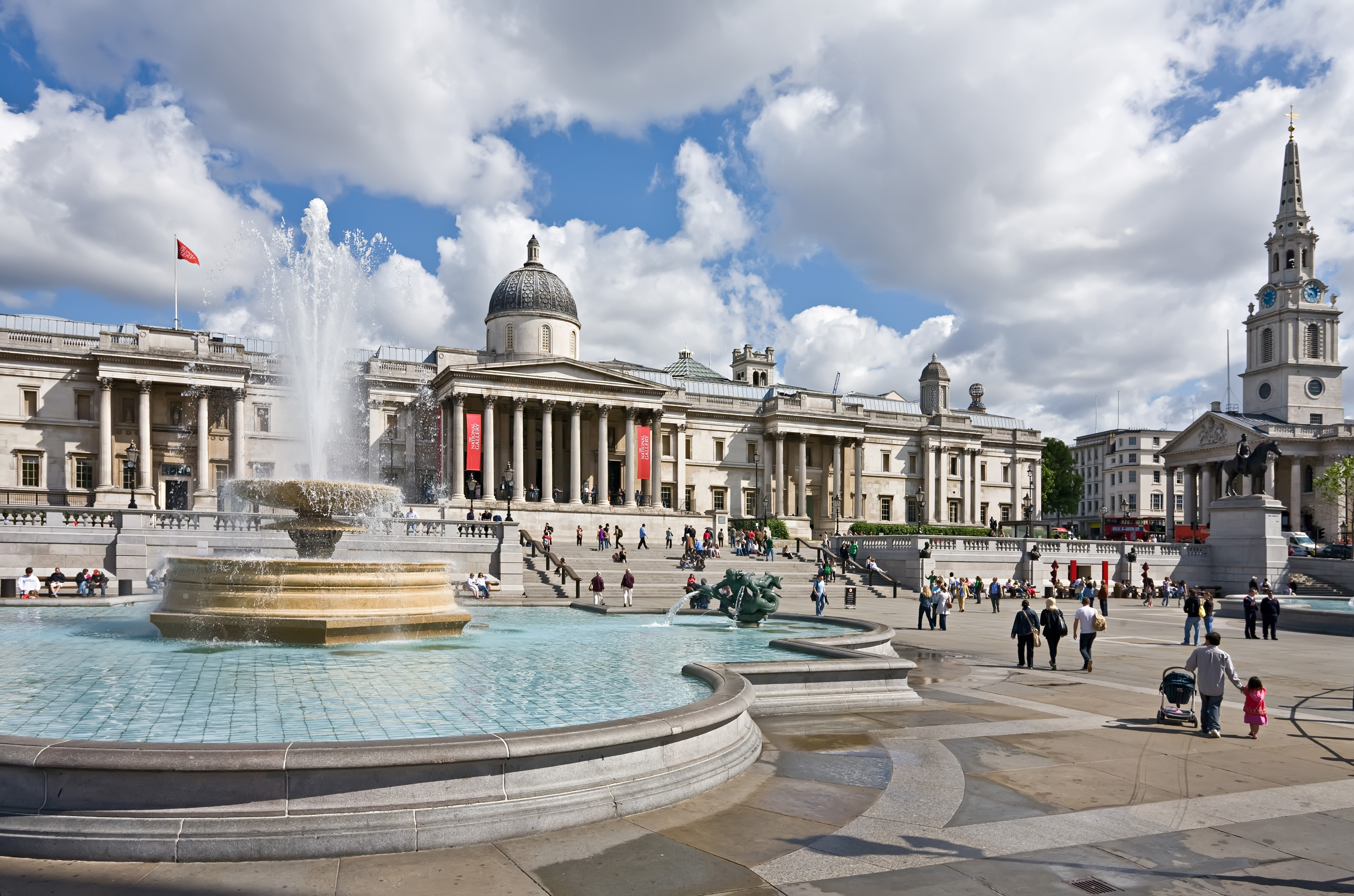
Fountain in Trafalgar Square

London's water supply infrastructure has developed over the centuries in line with the expansion of London.

Beginning in the 16th century, private companies supplied fresh water to parts of London from wells and the River Thames. The New River Company pioneered the commercial supply of drinking water, extracting from the River Lea and distributing to customers' homes. Further demand prompted new sources, particularly when the Agricultural and Industrial Revolution caused a boom in London's population and industry.

A crisis point was reached in the mid 19th century with the discovery that cholera arose from the extraction of water from the increasingly polluted Thames. The Metropolis Water Act 1852 banned this practice, allowing water companies three years to find other sources, but issues with contaminated water persisted. In 1904, London's water suppliers were taken into municipal ownership as the Metropolitan Water Board, which substantially upgraded the water infrastructure, building many new reservoirs. Ownership subsequently passed to the Thames Water Authority, before being re-privatised in the 1980s.

Today, the population of Greater London is supplied by four private companies: Thames Water (76% of population), Affinity Water (14%), Essex and Suffolk Water (6.6%) and SES Water (3.7%). The London area is classified as "seriously water stressed", receiving less rain than Rome, Dallas, or Sydney, and continued investment will be required to counteract the effects of climate change and a growing population in the 21st century.

Most of London's water is now supplied from five large water treatment works fed from the Thames and Lea, and to a lesser extent from aquifers and a desalination plant at Beckton. As of 2020, Thames Water's London zone, which serves the majority of London's water users, has the capacity to supply 2.3 gigalitres (510 million imperial gallons) of water per day.

== Early London water supply ==
Through to the late 16th century, London citizens turned to the tidal Thames for much of their non-drinking water. For drinking, due to the brackish and perceptibly poor taste of the Thames, they tended to rely on wells and tributaries rising in around a dozen natural springs on the north side of the Thames, restricting the city's expansion south of the river.

In 1247 work began on the Great Conduit from the spring at Tyburn. This was a lead pipe which led via Charing Cross, Strand, Fleet Street and Ludgate to a large cistern or tank in Cheapside. The city authorities appointed "keepers of the conduits" who controlled access so that users such as brewers, cooks and fishmongers would pay for the water they used. Wealthy Londoners living near the conduits could obtain permission for a connection to their homes, but this did not prevent their unauthorised tapping. Otherwise – particularly for homes which could not take a gravity feed – water from the conduits was taken to homes by water carriers, often called cobs, a term seen as dated by the 18th century. Records of frequent drownings prove many poorer citizens needed or desired water from the Thames and the larger tributaries; quite large quantities were needed for iron-smithery, cooking and brewing for instance. The Great Conduit system was extended over time, and in the 15th century sources were increased, firstly by a conduit from Westbourne springs at Paddington, and secondly by another from the upper Fleet at Highgate which supplied Cripplegate.

== Sixteenth century ==
In 1582, Dutchman Peter Morice, supported by the City of London, developed one of the first pumped water supply systems for the city, powered by undershot waterwheels housed in the northernmost arches of London Bridge, which eventually came to be known as the London Bridge Waterworks. A series of pipes and cisterns distributed the water across the city. The supply from the waterwheels was not constant, so the water mains were switched on periodically, on a weekly schedule.

Around 1593, another pumping station was built, again with the backing of the city, at Broken Wharf on Upper Thames Street by Bevis Bulmer. Powered by four horses, the Broken Wharf Waterworks supplied Cheapside and a number of private households. While not a financial success, the waterworks continued to operate as a small independent company until it was purchased by the London Bridge Waterworks in the early 18th century.

== Seventeenth century ==
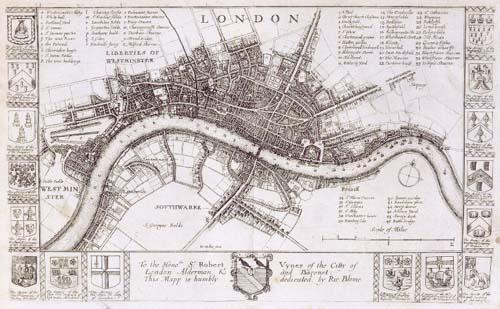
Richard Blome's map of London (1673). The development of the West End had recently begun to accelerate.

=== The New River ===
The early seventeenth century brought the construction of the New River, a 42-mile (68 km) artificial waterway which still carries water into London from Hertford, where it is fed from the River Lea and several nearby springs.

Initially proposed in 1602 by Edmund Colthurst, who had obtained a patent from King James I granting him the water rights, approximately 3 miles (5 km) of channel were dug before the project ran into financial difficulties. In 1606, the City of London petitioned Parliament, which passed a series of acts overriding Colthurst's patent and transferred the water rights to Hugh Myddelton, who helped fund the project. Construction of the New River resumed in 1609 and it was officially opened in 1613.

The New River cost Myddelton a lot of money, but in 1612 he was successful in securing investment and assistance from the king. At completion, the New River had cost around £19,000 (equivalent to £4.06 million in 2025), and by 1620, the total expenses for the first fifteen years had reached £32,000 (equivalent to £7.97 million in 2025).

The New River Company, incorporated in 1619 as one of England's first joint-stock companies, took over the New River and became an important force in London's water supply until the company was absorbed by the Metropolitan Water Board nearly 300 years later.

=== The Great Fire ===
The construction of much of London's current water distribution infrastructure dates to after the Great Fire of London in 1666, which destroyed much of the city's previous wooden and lead water piping. The London Bridge Waterworks machinery was largely destroyed, but replacements engineered by Peter Morice's grandson remained under the bridge until the early 19th century, before the New London Bridge was erected in the 1830s.

=== New companies ===
In the second half of the century, several new water works were established:

- In 1669, the Shadwell Water Works were established by Thomas Neale as part of a larger project to develop the land at Shadwell. The works drew water from the Thames using a pump powered by four horses, and later by steam engines. It was incorporated by the Shadwell Waterworks Act 1691 (3 Will. & Mar. c. 37 Pr.) in 1692.
- In 1673, the Millbank Waterworks was established by Michael Arnold, a brewer in Westminster, along with two co-owners.
- In 1675, a royal patent was granted to Ralph Bucknall and Ralph Wayne of the York Buildings Company to construct a horse-powered water works on the site of the York House estate, by the Thames south of the Strand.
- In 1692, the Hampstead Waterworks were incorporated as a joint-stock company, which was granted the rights to water from Hampstead.

== Eighteenth century ==
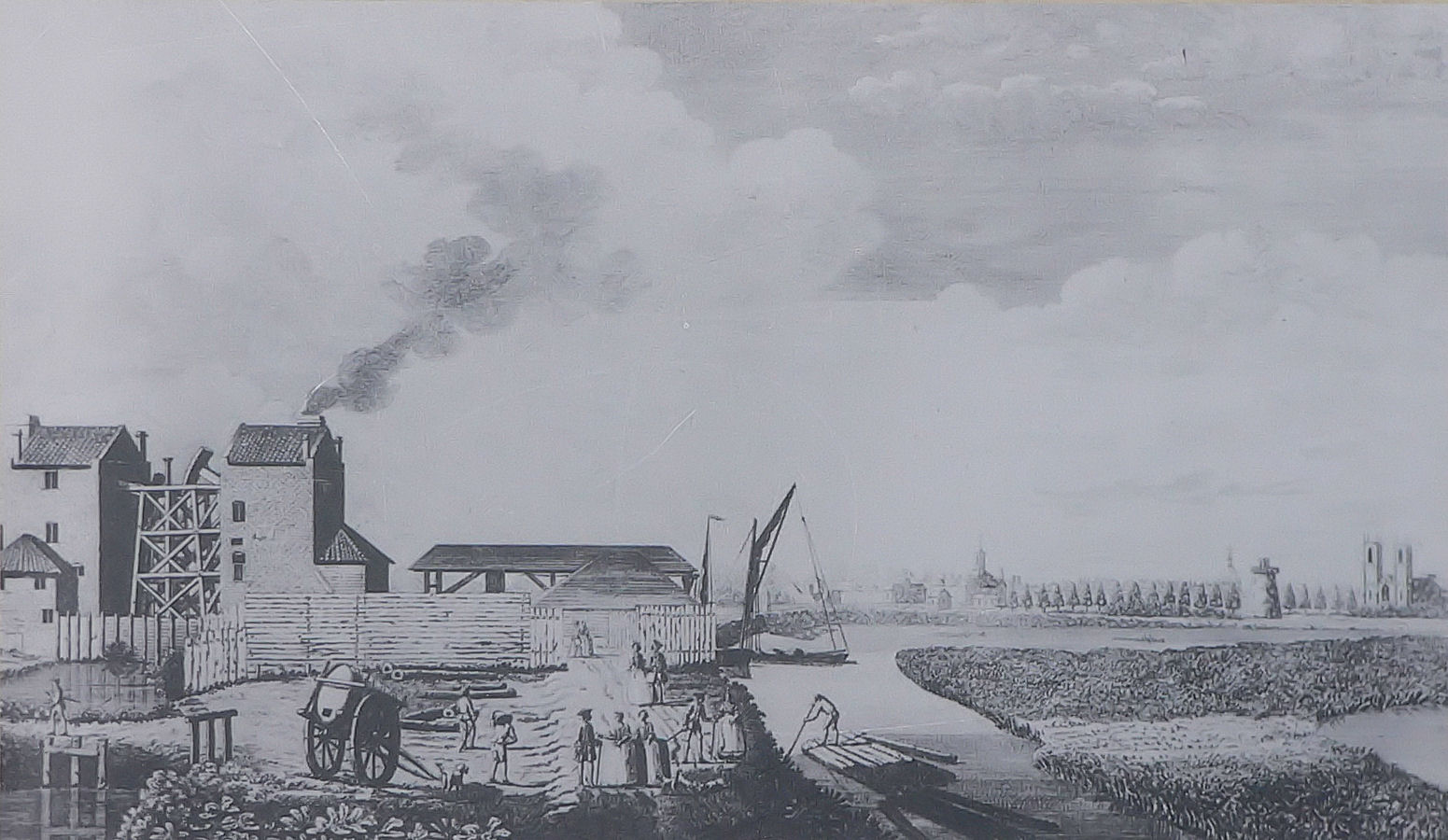
Chelsea Waterworks, 1752. Two Newcomen beam engines pumped Thames water from a canal to reservoirs at Green Park and Hyde Park.

The Chelsea Waterworks Company was established in 1723 "for the better supplying the City and Liberties of Westminster and parts adjacent with water". The company received a royal charter on 8 March 1723. The company dug large water beds in borderlands of Chelsea with south-west Westminster (Pimlico) using water from the tidal Thames. In 1727 they purchased the Millbank Waterworks. Two Newcomen engine houses were erected in 1742 and 1746, and the first Boulton and Watt engine for water supply was installed on the same site in 1778.

Waterworks were established in East London, at West Ham in 1743 and at Lea Bridge before 1767.

The Borough Waterworks Company was formed in 1770, originally supplying water to a brewery and the surrounds: between London and Southwark Bridges. An adjacent zone was supplied by the London Bridge Waterworks Company.

The Lambeth Waterworks Company was founded in 1785 to supply water to south and west London. It was established on the south bank of the River Thames close to the present site of Hungerford Bridge where the Royal Festival Hall now stands. The first water intake of the company was on the south side of the river drawing on it around high tide. After complaints that the water was foul, the intake was moved to the middle of the river.

== Nineteenth century ==
=== New companies ===
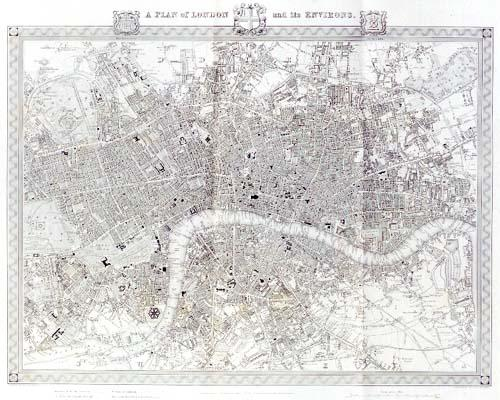
London as engraved by J. & C. Walker in 1845 from a map by R Creighton

As the metropolis grew in the 19th century, London became the laboratory for water supply, and later waste removal. Several new water supply companies were established leading to a total of nine private water companies:

- The South London Waterworks Company was established by a local act of Parliament, the South London Waterworks Act 1805 (45 Geo. 3. c. cxix). The company extracted water from the Thames beside Vauxhall Bridge.
- The West Middlesex Waterworks Company was founded in 1806 to supply water for Marylebone and Paddington. In 1808 the company installed cast iron pipes to supply water from its intakes at Hammersmith.
- The East London Waterworks Company, also founded in 1806, acquired the Shadwell Water Works, as well as works at Lea Bridge and West Ham on the Lea.
- The Kent Waterworks Company was incorporated in 1809 to supply Deptford, Lee, Greenwich, Lewisham, and Rotherhithe with water from the River Ravensbourne.
- The Grand Junction Waterworks Company was formed in 1811 to exploit a clause in the Grand Junction Canal Company's Act which allowed them to supply water via the canal from the Colne and the River Brent. It was thought these sources would be better than those of the Tideway, but they proved to be of poor quality and insufficient to meet demand, so the company resorted to taking from the Tideway south of Chelsea Hospital.

The Lambeth Waterworks Company expanded in 1802 to supply Kennington and about this time replaced its wooden pipes with iron ones.

Although the acts of Parliament which created the water companies encouraged them to compete for customers, the companies quickly realised that this would not be profitable. In 1815 the East London company agreed with the New River Company to set a boundary between the two companies' areas. In 1817, a similar agreement was reached between the New River, Chelsea, West Middlesex, and Grand Junction companies.

The London Bridge Waterworks Company was dissolved in 1822, and its water supply licence was purchased by the New River Company. Later that year, the Borough Waterworks Company purchased the London Bridge licence from the New River Company, and it was renamed the Southwark Water Company. The company extracted water from the Tideway using steam engines to pump it to a cistern at the top of a 60-foot (18 m) tower.

=== Slow sand filtration ===
In January 1829, amongst increasing complaints about the quality of water supplied by the water companies, the Chelsea Waterworks began using a pioneering new technology to purify its water. Originally developed by John Gibb of Paisley, Scotland, and deployed for the Chelsea Waterworks by James Simpson, the slow sand filter harnesses a complex biological film formed on the sand to provide excellent filtration of water with very little energy use. Filtration of water would eventually be mandated by the Metropolis Water Act 1852, and to this day a large amount of London's water is still purified using slow sand filtration.

=== Expansion ===
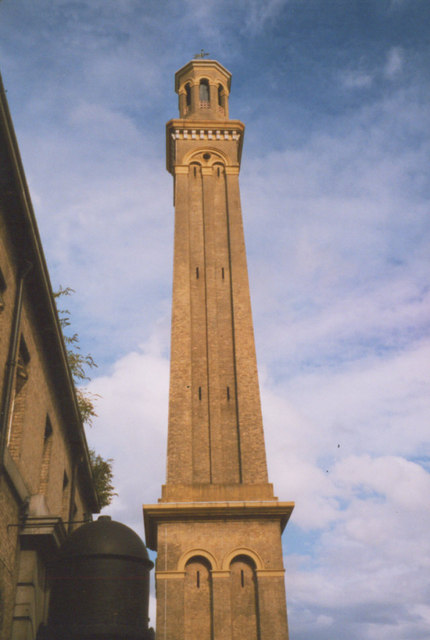
Standpipe Tower at Brentford

The West Middlesex Waterworks Company established a 3.5-million-imperial-gallon (16 Ml) reservoir at Campden Hill near Notting Hill. In 1825 the company built a new reservoir at Barrow Hill next to Primrose Hill in North London.

In 1832 the Lambeth Waterworks Company built a reservoir at Streatham Hill, and in 1834 obtained an Act of Parliament to extend its supplied zone. In the same year, the Company brought 16 acres (6.5 ha) of land in Brixton where it built a reservoir and works on Brixton Hill, by Brixton Prison.

In 1833 the South London Waterworks Company was supplying 12,046 houses with approximately 12,000 imperial gallons (55,000 L) of water per day. In 1834, the company was renamed the Vauxhall Water Company.

The Grand Junction Waterworks Company built a pumping station near Kew Bridge at Brentford in 1838 to house its new steam pump and two similar pumps bought from Boulton, Watt and Company in 1820. The water was taken from the middle of the river and pumped into filtering reservoirs and to a 200 ft (61 m) tower to provide gravity-fed water. A 6-to-7-mile (9.7 to 11 km) main took the water to a reservoir on Campden Hill near Notting Hill with a capacity of 6 million imperial gallons (27 Ml).

In 1829, the East London Waterworks Company moved their source of water further up river to Lea Bridge as a result of pollution caused by population growth. Clean water was now abstracted from the natural channel which had been by-passed by the Hackney Cut, to a new reservoir at Old Ford. In 1830 the company gained a lease on the existing reservoir at Clapton. In 1841 the East London Waterworks Company was supplying 36,916 houses. In 1845 the limits of supply of the company were "all those portions of the Metropolis, and its suburbs, which lie to the east of the city, Shoreditch, the Kingsland Road, and Dalston; extending their mains even across the river Lea into Essex, as far as West Ham." The water supplied by the company was taken from the Lea, with waterworks on 30 acres (12 ha) of land at Old Ford.

The Lonsdale Road Reservoir (also the Leg of Mutton Reservoir or Leg o' Mutton Reservoir) was built in 1838 and decommissioned in 1960, it is now a local nature reserve.

On 10 January 1845 the Southwark and Vauxhall waterworks companies submitted a memorandum to the Health of Towns Commissioners proposing amalgamation. A consequent bill was passed by parliament, and the Southwark and Vauxhall Waterworks Company was formed later that year. The area supplied by the SVWC was centred on the Borough of Southwark. Thus it spread east to Rotherhithe, south to Camberwell. It also spread west including Battersea and parts of Clapham and Lambeth. The amalgamated company established waterworks at Battersea Fields with two depositing reservoirs with a capacity of 32 million imperial gallons (150 Ml); and two filtering reservoirs holding 11 million imperial gallons (50 Ml). In 1850 the company's "treated" water was described by microbiologist Arthur Hassall as "the most disgusting which I have ever examined". His tests and those of others precipitated the law of two years later.

=== Metropolis Water Act ===
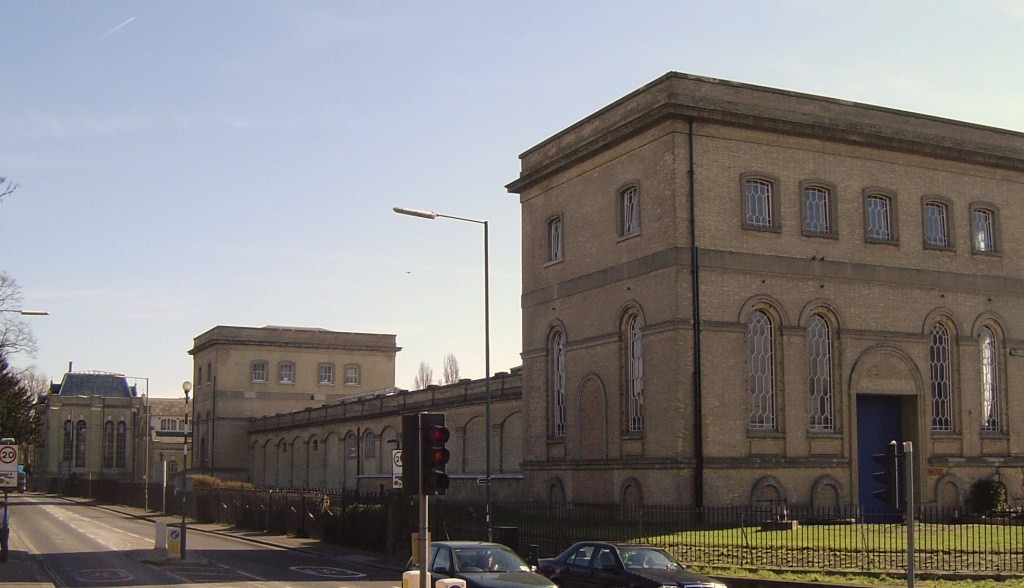
The waterworks buildings at Hampton

The companies often supplied too little water. It was often contaminated. The extent of contamination was confirmed by John Snow during the 1854 cholera epidemic. Population growth in London had been very rapid (more than doubling between 1800 and 1850), with little increase in infrastructure. The Metropolis Water Act 1852 was passed to "make provision for securing the supply to the Metropolis of pure and wholesome water." Under it, it became unlawful for any water company to extract water for domestic use from the tidal reaches of the Thames after 31 August 1855, and from the end of that year all such water was required to be "effectually filtered". The Metropolitan Commission of Sewers was formed. New water intakes, plants and pumps would have to be west of where the river became tidal (Teddington Lock) and along the Lea.

The Chelsea Waterworks and the Lambeth Waterworks companies, who shared the services of James Simpson, established the reservoirs and filtration plants at Seething Wells on the riverside, spanning Long Ditton and Surbiton. The Chelsea's former central site was taken over by railway companies for Victoria Station and its goods sidings and yards. The Grand Junction, West Middlesex and Southwark and Vauxhall Waterworks Companies established the Hampton Water Treatment Works as a joint venture above Molesey Lock, designed by Joseph Quick. Though small, the Grand Junction and Sunnyside Reservoirs there were supplemented by filter beds – all by the SVWC in 1855. These served a 36-inch (910 mm) diameter main ending at Battersea. A third reservoir was opened later that year between Nunhead Cemetery and Peckham Rye.

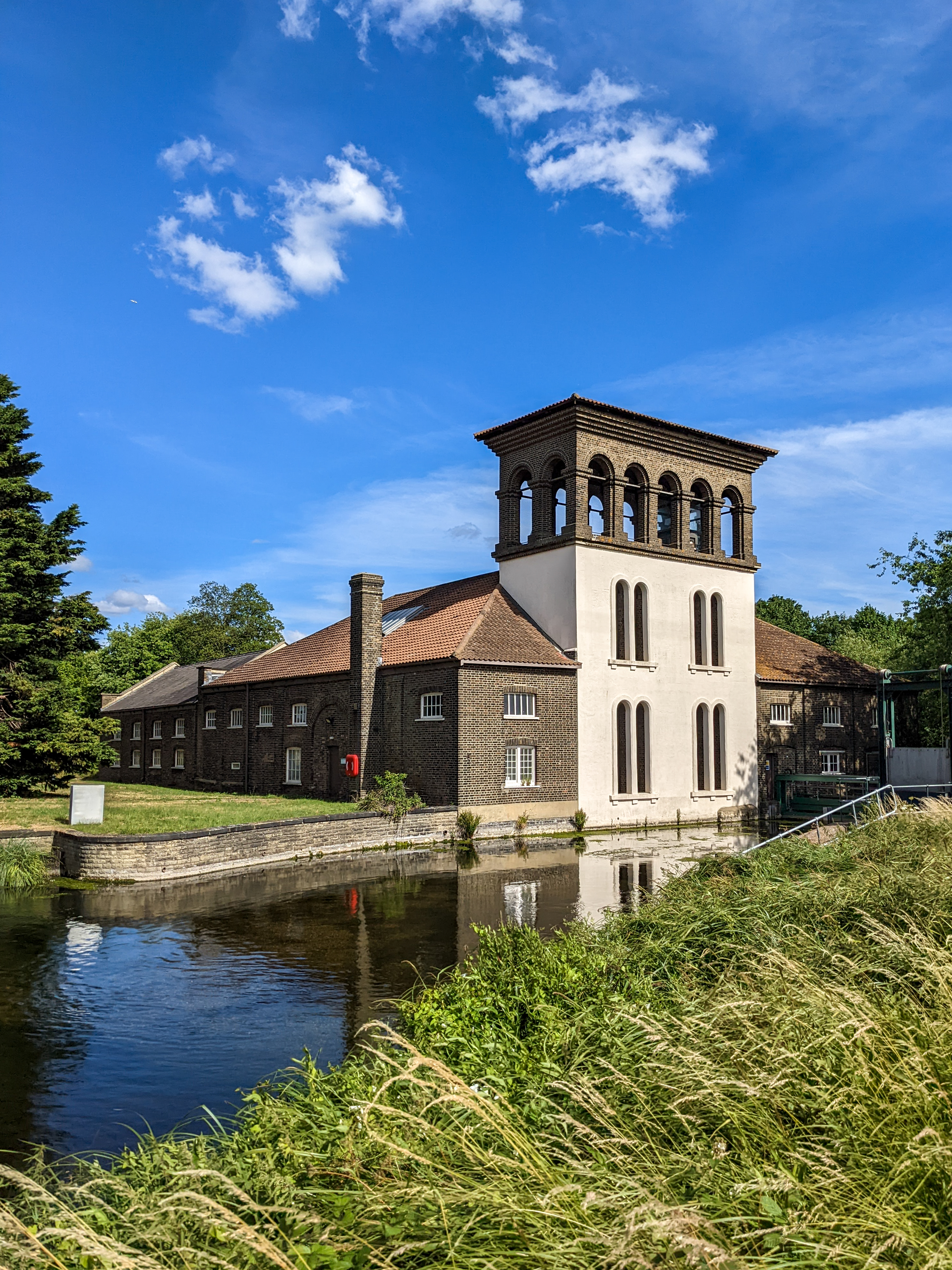
The Coppermill, Walthamstow

In the mid 19th century the East London Waterworks Company purchased the Coppermill at Walthamstow and modified it to drive a water pump to assist in the building of reservoirs on nearby marshland in the Lea Valley . The company built a series of reservoirs which were High Maynard Reservoir, Low Maynard Reservoir, five linked numbered reservoirs making the Walthamstow Reservoirs, the East Warwick Reservoir and the West Warwick Reservoir.

In 1872 the Lambeth Waterworks Company moved upstream on the Thames to Molesey, followed by the Chelsea Waterworks Company. They built the Molesey Reservoirs there in 1872.

The East London Waterworks Company replaced their reservoir at Clapton with one at Stamford Hill in 1891; places which adjoin in today's London Borough of Hackney.

In 1897 the New River Company started developing the Kempton Park works (today all in Hanworth). This would supply more water than the plant at Cricklewood that drew on the River Brent.

In 1898 the SVWC started work on the Bessborough and Knight Reservoirs across the Thames from Hampton at Molesey. By 1903 the SVWC supplied a population of 860,173 in 128,871 houses of which 122,728 (95.3%) had a constant supply. The Lambeth Waterworks company started work on Island Barn Reservoir at Molesey in 1900.

== Twentieth century ==
=== Nationalisation: the Metropolitan Water Board ===
The private water companies were nationalised, by compulsory purchase, from 1902–03. The Metropolis Water Act 1902 created the Metropolitan Water Board (MWB), which was formed by with 67 members; 65 of these nominees of local authorities, who then appointed the paid chairman and vice-chairman. A series of arbitration hearings was held to determine the amount that the shareholders of the nine private water companies were paid, which resulted in a total payout of £47 million (equivalent to £4.94 billion in 2025). This payment was made in "water stock", which carried a guaranteed dividend of 3%, payable by the MWB.

Over the next 70 years, the MWB significantly invested in London's water supply, constructing many large reservoirs in the Thames and Lea valley areas.

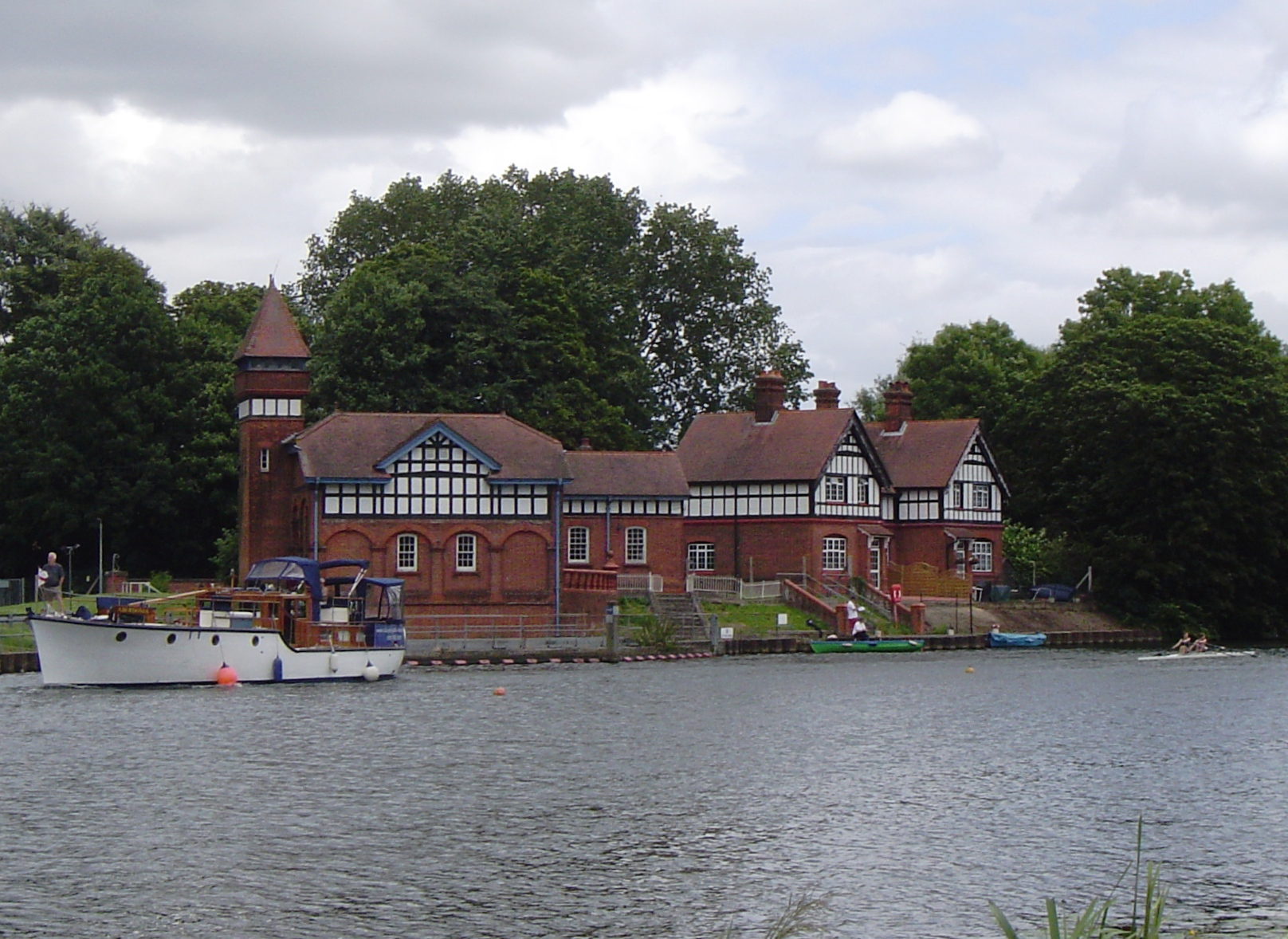
Water extract plant buildings at Hythe End

In 1902, the extraction pumphouse opened at Hythe End for the Staines Reservoirs and Staines Reservoir Aqueduct. These supply water to the East London Waterworks within the north-east limits of Sunbury (returned to a field), "Kempton Park" Waterworks (north-east) and Hampton Advanced Water Treatment Works (south). The Thames Conservancy limited such taking (abstraction) especially in drought. Thus the large reservoirs ensured a few weeks' supply or longer with water restrictions.

The Metropolitan Water Board Railway was opened in 1916 to carry coal from the river at Hampton to Kempton Park. An engine house with powerful steam engines was opened at Kempton Park in 1929, which has now become Kempton Park Steam Engines museum.

=== Thames–Lee Water Main ===
By the 1950s, the flow of the River Lee was insufficient to supply the demand in eastern areas of London, and treated water had to be piped from west London to compensate. In drought periods, almost the entire flow of the Lee was extracted, at times affecting navigation on the river.

To resolve this, the Thames–Lee water main was conceived to transport raw water from the River Thames to East London to be treated. Designed by consulting engineers Sir William Halcrow & Partners, and constructed between 1955 and 1959, it is a 19-mile (31 km), 102-inch (2.6 m) diameter concrete-lined tunnel running from the non-tidal Thames at Hampton Water Treatment Works to Lockwood pumping station at the Lee Valley Reservoir Chain. The tunnel runs at a depth of 68 to 190 feet (21 to 58 m) and passes through 24 access shafts of 12 feet (3.7 m) diameter. Constructed of bolted reinforced concrete and cast iron segmental rings using a new form of rotary tunnelling shield, the tunnel was believed to be the longest in Europe at the time of its completion. The tunnel was designed to transfer 120 million imperial gallons (550 megalitres) of water per day.

Water flows through the tunnel by gravity as far as Lockwood, where pumping plant lifts the water into a further section of conventional cast-iron main which delivers the water to the King George V and William Girling reservoirs. Another pump was originally installed at the Stoke Newington shaft to supply up to 12.5 million imperial gallons (57 megalitres) per day to the reservoirs there.

The cost of the project was £4 million (equivalent to £80.2 million in 2025).

=== Consolidation and privatisation ===
On 1 April 1974, the Metropolitan Water Board and other local water boards (the Thames Conservancy, the Lee Conservancy Catchment Board and parts of the Essex and Kent river authorities) were combined into the Thames Water Authority under the provisions of the Water Act 1973 — another step towards an integrated policy of water management.

In 1989, the Thames Water Authority was privatised as Thames Water, under the provisions of the Water Act 1989, as a state-regulated company that provides most of London's supply.

=== Thames Water Ring Main ===
By the 1980s, the ageing system of surface-level trunk mains, which transported treated water in bulk around London, was becoming overloaded and suffering an increasing number of leaks. The Thames Water Ring Main was a major project, constructed between 1988 and 1993 at a cost of £248 million (equivalent to £534 million in 2025), to reduce the reliance on these trunk mains and allow them to be more easily maintained. A deep-level system of 80 kilometres (50 mi) of concrete tunnels, the Ring Main connected the large water works in the west of London with pumping stations in the centre, close to the areas of highest demand. It also allowed a number of smaller treatment works to be closed.

=== Aquifer Recharge ===
Following the investment in London's water infrastructure over the 20th century, and the decline in industrial use of wells and boreholes, the groundwater levels in the aquifer beneath London began to rebound from their 1967 low of 100 metres (330 ft) below ground level. This rising groundwater raised the risk of damage to tunnels and structures with deep foundations, but also the opportunity to use the aquifer itself as a reservoir.

The North London Artificial Recharge (NLAR) scheme, licensed by the Environment Agency in 1995, consists of a network of boreholes in the Enfield, Haringey, and Lee Valley areas. During times of drought, these boreholes can be used to extract water to supplement low river flows. The nearly 400-year-old New River took on a new role as a convenient method of transporting raw water from the Enfield and Haringey boreholes to the treatment works at Hornsey and Coppermills (via the Amhurst Main running from Stoke Newington to the Lee Valley). When water supply is plentiful, the aquifer is artificially recharged through the same boreholes, using treated water from the water distribution network. The confined nature of the aquifer ensures that abstraction has no impact on the overlying river system.

Total yields of the scheme were estimated in 1999 at 90 megalitres per day from the Enfield and Haringey sources, and 60 megalitres per day for the Lee Valley sources, for a total scheme yield of around 150 megalitres per day. Recharge rates of 40 megalitres per day have been achieved, without impact on customer supply. In 1997, low river and reservoir levels meant that 14,600 megalitres of water were withdrawn from the aquifer, an amount equivalent to 30% of the usable capacity of the Lee Valley Reservoir Chain.

== Present day ==
=== Leakage ===
London's water suppliers have come under significant criticism for the amount of leakage in the water network, with the total leakage reported at around 500 megalitres per day in 2019. Many of London's water pipes are more than 60 years old, with the oldest being over 150 years old. Thames Water in particular has been criticised for distributing substantial profits to shareholders while almost a quarter of the water they supply is lost through leaks.

In 2018, Ofwat, the regulator, found that Thames Water had breached its legal obligations in reducing leakage, and imposed a £120 million penalty, £65 million of which was returned to customers as a rebate on their bills.

=== Desalination Plant ===
In 2010, a desalination plant was opened at Beckton at a cost of £250 million (equivalent to £386 million in 2025) to provide an additional 150 megalitres per day from the tidal Thames in times of drought. This facility, the Thames Gateway Water Treatment Works, is rarely used due to the high cost of operation, and in 2022 the capacity was downgraded to 100 Ml/day. It came under criticism during construction as a waste of money which could be spent on fixing leaks.

=== Expansion ===
The Thames Water Ring Main was extended between 2007 and 2010, with the construction of two new tunnels: a northern leg from New River Head to Stoke Newington, connecting the treatment plant at Coppermills to the ring main, and a southern leg from Brixton to the pumping station and reservoirs at Honor Oak.

Following the success of the aquifer recharge scheme in North London, trials were conducted in the early 2000s on the possibility of a corresponding South London Artificial Recharge Scheme (SLARS), initially in the Streatham area.

The construction of High Speed 1 presented a number of novel possibilities to increase groundwater extraction at low cost. The "Elred" (East London resource development) scheme reuses ten boreholes and a number of pipelines, located between Stratford and East Ham, which were originally built for temporary dewatering during construction of the High Speed 1 tunnels. Thames Water negotiated with the project to enhance the specification of these boreholes, and a new treatment plant was built at East Ham. The system started operation in May 2005, and can treat up to 23.7 megalitres per day, with an expected sustainable capacity of 15 Ml/d. The "Stratford Box" pumping station, required to dewater the sub-surface Stratford International station, also feeds the extracted groundwater into the Lea Valley reservoirs.

== Notable infrastructure ==
Raw Water Reservoirs
Group	Reservoir	Location	Opened	Capacity gigalitres	Major sources
Lea	Banbury Reservoir	51.6047°N 0.0350°W	1903	2.95	Lea, Thames via Thames–Lea Tunnel
Thames South	Bessborough Reservoir	51°24′5.9″N 0°23′10.1″W	1907	5.45	Thames
Lea	East Warwick Reservoir	51.580457°N 0.056176°W	1869–93	0.96	Lea
Lea	High Maynard Reservoir	51.5889°N 0.0466°W	1869–93	0.68	Lea
Thames South	Island Barn Reservoir	51°23′26″N 0°21′48″W	1911	4.5	Thames
Lea	King George's or King George V Reservoir	51.6499°N 0.0161°W	1912	12.45	Lea, New River via Northern Transfer Tunnel
Thames North	King George VI Reservoir	51.449075°N 0.502482°W	1947	15.88	Thames
Thames South	Knight Reservoir	51°23′56.6″N 0°23′36.2″W	1907	5.46	Thames
Lea	Lockwood Reservoir	51.5950°N 0.0479°W	1903	2.5	Lea, Thames via Thames–Lea Tunnel, New River via Amhurst Main
Lea	Low Maynard Reservoir	51.58848°N 0.049782°W	1869–93	0.15	Lea
Thames South	Queen Elizabeth II Reservoir	51°23′27″N 0°23′32″W	1962	19.5	Thames
Thames North	Queen Mary Reservoir	51°25′N 0°27′W	1925	30.6	Thames
Thames North	Queen Mother Reservoir	51°28′55″N 0°32′56″W	1976	38.0	Thames
Thames North	Staines Reservoirs	51°26′49″N 0°29′12″W	1902	15.2	Thames
Lea	Walthamstow Reservoirs No.1 to No.5	51°34′55.3″N 0°02′58.0″W	1863-66		Lea
Lea	William Girling Reservoir	51.6316°N 0.0244°W	1951	16.5	Lea
Lea	West Warwick Reservoir	51.576456°N 0.058494°W	1869–93	0.8	Lea
Thames North	Wraysbury Reservoir	51°27′39.7″N 0°31′25.2″W	1970	34.0	Thames

Water Treatment Works
Name	Location	Opened	Capacity (megalitres per day)		Source
Name	Location	Opened	Maximum	Usable	Source
Ashford Common water treatment works	51.41772°N 0.43802°W	1958		685	Staines Reservoirs and Queen Mary Reservoir
Hampton water treatment works	51.41214°N 0.37452°W	1850s	700	587	Thames Reservoirs
Coppermills	51.57660°N 0.04692°W	1969	680	539	Lea Valley Reservoirs
Kempton Park water treatment works	51.42710°N 0.40275°W	1906		179	Staines Reservoirs and Queen Mary Reservoir
Walton	51.40434°N 0.39799°W	1907		125	Thames Reservoirs
Thames Gateway (desalination)	51.51654°N 0.09216°E	2010	150	100	Thames Tideway
Chingford South water treatment works	51.63629°N 0.01582°W	2006		58	William Girling and King George V Reservoirs
Hornsey water treatment works	51.59293°N 0.11805°W	1861		39	New River
Stoke Newington water treatment works		1856			New River (decommissioned 1991)
Lea Bridge water treatment works					River Lea
East Ham	51.53872°N 0.07145°E	2005	23.7	15	Aquifer

== See also ==
- History of London
- List of reservoirs and dams in the United Kingdom
- Metropolitan Drinking Fountain and Cattle Trough Association
- Kew Bridge Steam Museum
- London sewer system
- History of water supply and sanitation
