= Knight and Bessborough Reservoirs =

Protected area in Surrey, England

Coordinates: 51.400°N 0.393°W

- Site of Special Scientific Interest
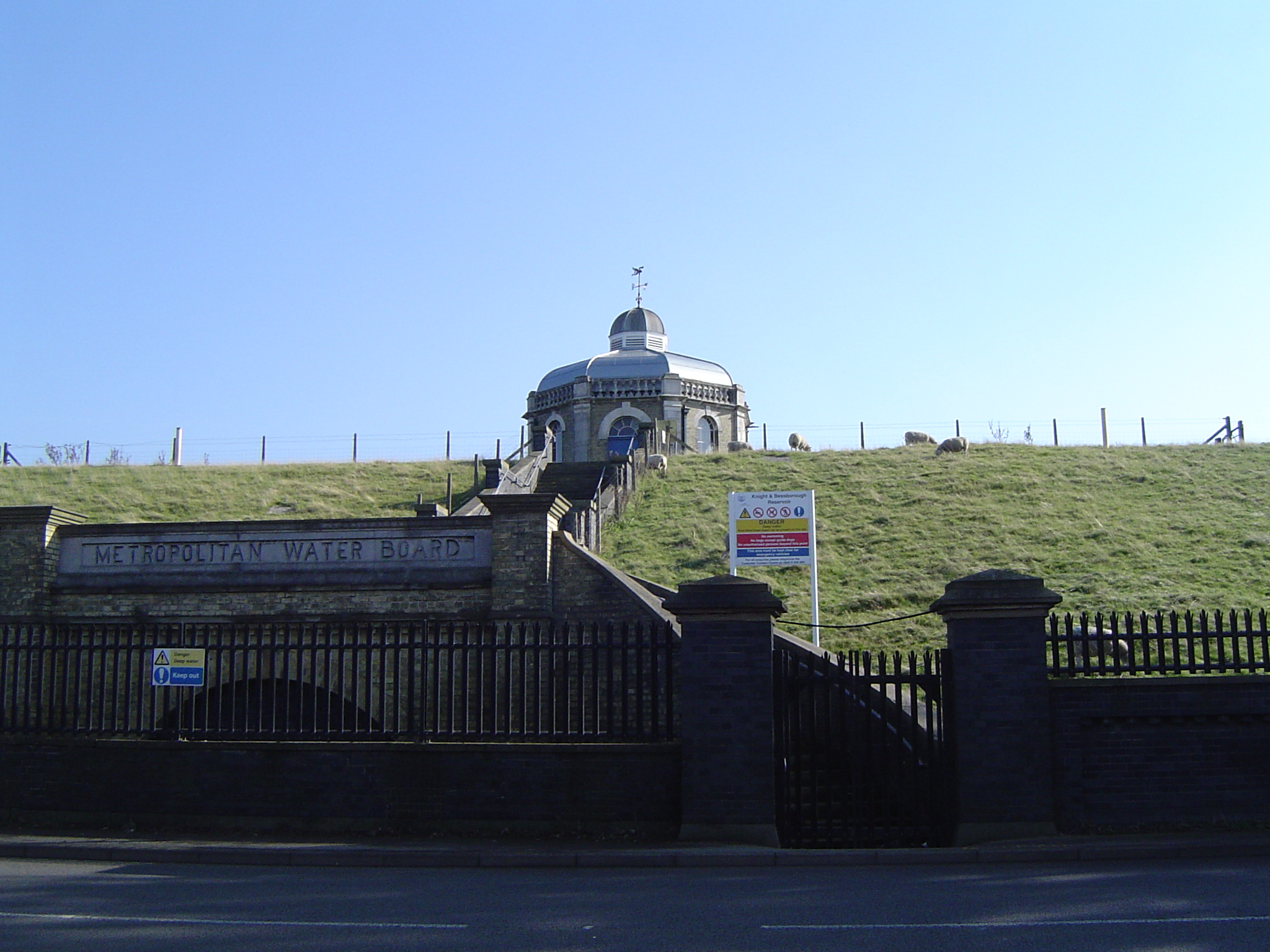
- Location of Knight and Bessborough Reservoirs.
- Area of search: Surrey
- Grid reference: TQ 119 680
- Interest: Biological
- Area: 63.4 hectares (157 acres)
- Notification date: 1999
- Location map: Magic Map

Knight and Bessborough Reservoirs is a 63.4-hectare (157-acre) biological Site of Special Scientific Interest in Walton-on-Thames in Surrey. It is part of South West London Waterbodies Ramsar site and Special Protection Area

Knight Reservoir and Bessborough Reservoir support many wildfowl, including nationally important numbers of wintering shovelers and substantial populations of gadwalls, cormorants and goldeneyes.

The site is private land with no public access.
