= Banbury Reservoir =

Reservoir in London, United Kingdom

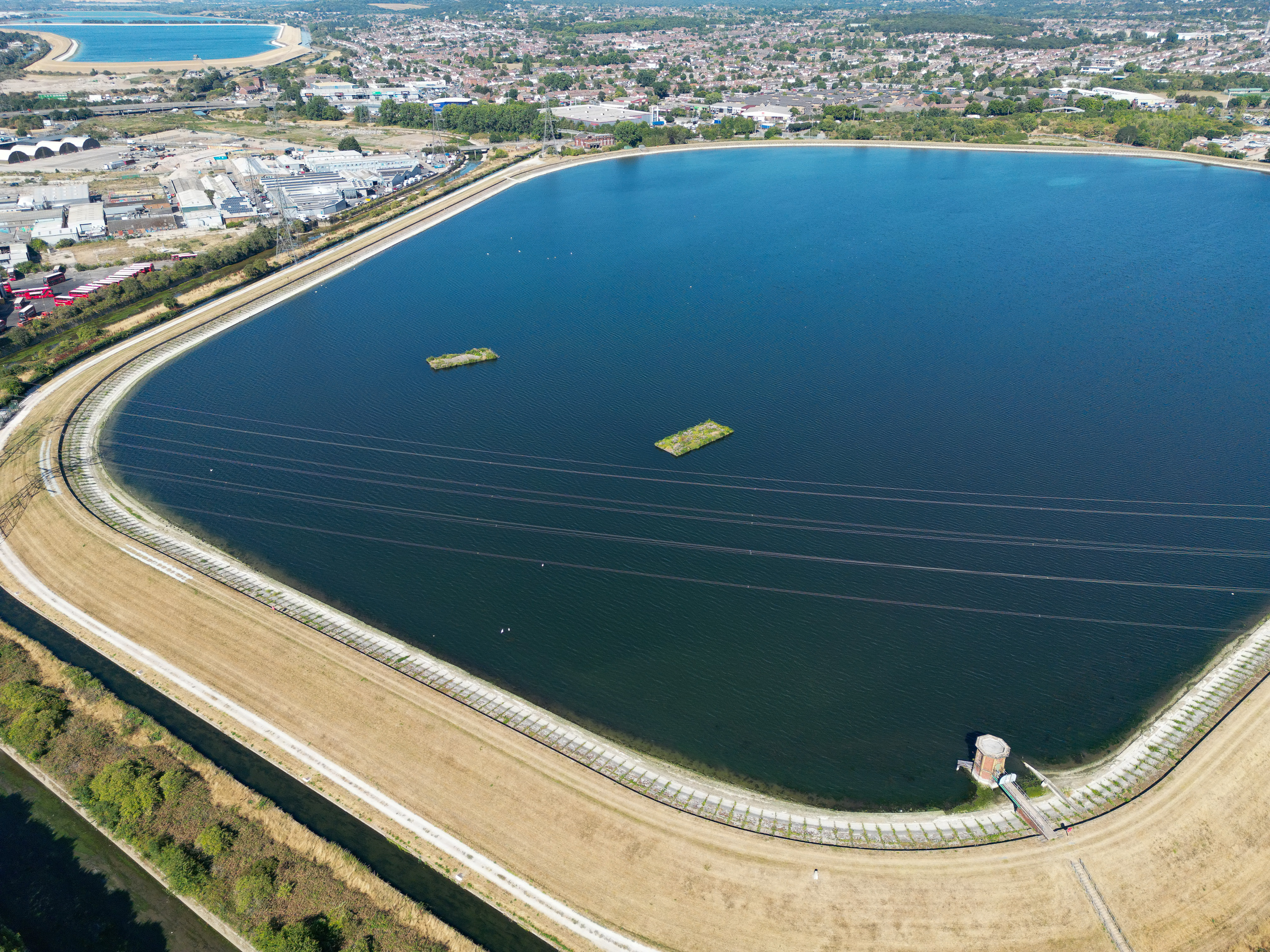
- Aerial view of Banbury Reservoir

- Location within Greater London
- Location: London Borough of Waltham Forest
- Coordinates: 51.6047°N 0.0350°W
- Type: reservoir
- Basin countries: United Kingdom
- Surface area: 46 hectares (0.18 sq mi)
- Max. depth: 8.5 metres (28 ft)
- Water volume: 2.95 Gl (0.65×10^{9} imp gal)

Banbury Reservoir is located at Walthamstow in the London Borough of Waltham Forest. It is one of the storage reservoirs of the Lee Valley Reservoir Chain in the Middle Lea Valley.

== History ==
The reservoir was completed by and for the East London Waterworks Company in 1903, and was subsequently taken over by the newly formed Metropolitan Water Board in 1904. The reservoir is now owned by Thames Water.

== See also ==
- London water supply infrastructure
