= Chingford South water treatment works =

The Chingford South water treatment works is a 58 million litre per day water processing facility commissioned in 2005 and located adjacent to the William Girling reservoir in north east London.

== Background ==
In March 2003 Thames Water identified that by 2005 there would be a deficit in water treatment and supply capacity in North London. To address this deficit a new water treatment facility was constructed on 1.5 ha site adjacent to the William Girling reservoir and the A110 road (51.63629°N 0.01582°W).

== Facilities ==
The Chingford South works abstracts water from the surface waters of the William Girling and King George V reservoirs at up to 40 million litre per day (Ml/d) available throughout the year, and up to 18 Ml/d from the North London Abstraction and Recharge scheme boreholes for up to six months of the year.

The plant is housed in five major buildings:

- Low lift pumping station
- Main process plant (70m by 40m)
- Lamella clarifier plant
- Ozone generation and contactor
- High lift pumping station

The main process units are dissolved air flotation (DAF) and rapid gravity filters (RGF).

Steel tanks were used instead of conventional concrete tanks. Although their design life of 25 years is shorter than concrete tanks (60 years), construction time was faster.

The works were constructed over the period April 2004 to September 2005. The completed plant was handed over to Thames Water in November 2005. The cost was £43 million.

== See also ==
- London water supply infrastructure
