= Hornsey water treatment works =

The Hornsey water treatment works in north London abstracts raw water from the New River and supplies treated potable water to Hornsey and surrounding districts. The treatment works were first constructed in 1862 and have been modernized and remodeled several times and still provide clean water to consumers in north London.

== History ==
The New River supplied water to Islington, but water was also abstracted by settlements along its route. Hornsey was supplied with water from such an offtake. In 1862 a treatment works was established. This comprised a reception basin with an area of about one acre (0.4 ha), from which water was transferred to a reservoir which allowed solids to settle out. The main water treatment was sand filter beds. Water was introduced above a thick layer of sand, and flowed down by gravity through the sand bed. Solids were trapped in the upper layer of sand. Clarified water from the bottom of the filter was pumped to local consumers. Hornsey works initially comprised three filter beds. Gradually the beds became clogged with matter and had to be drained down and the contaminated layers of sand were scaped off and removed.

== Development ==
By 1876 a further filter bed had been constructed, and by 1900 there were nine filter beds in operation. Water was transferred by new pumps at 2.5 million gallons per day (11.4 Ml/d) to Crouch Hill reservoir and to Hornsey Lane reservoir. The two reservoirs were capable of storing 12 million gallons (55.0 Ml) and supplied Islington, Hornsey and part of the City.

In 1887 a 215 feet (65.5 m) deep well was sunk into the chalk aquifer and supplemented the water supply.

A 1.25 million gallon (5.7 Ml) contact tank was constructed on the site. Water was dosed with chlorine as a bactericide, the contact tank allowed the chlorine to take effect before water was distributed to consumers.

By the 1990s the plant comprised six slow sand filters with a granular activated carbon (GAC) sandwich. Comprising typically 300 mm lower sand, 135 mm GAC, 450 mm upper sand. This was followed by disinfection using super-chlorination and de-chlorination.

In addition to the New River water was abstracted from four boreholes. By 1990 both Hornsey and Stoke Newington water works were recognised as being old and inefficient. Stoke Newington closed in 1991 and Hornsey was scheduled to close in 1996. However, with increasing demand for water the decision was made to retain and upgrade Hornsey water works. By 2000 Thames Water wished to decommission the slow sand filters, using modern technology to increase capacity.

== Hornsey water works today ==
The treatment plant comprises:

- Raw water abstraction
- Coagulant and pH correction (acid dosing)
- Coagulation/flocculation
- Three dissolved air flotation (DAF) units
- pH correction (caustic dosing)
- Five Rapid gravity filter (RGF) units
- Eight catalytic granular activated carbon (cGAC) units
- Disinfection
- High lift pumping

The capacity of the plant is 50 Ml/day. This is sufficient to supply a population of about 350,000.

== See also ==
- London water supply infrastructure
