= Queen Mary Reservoir =

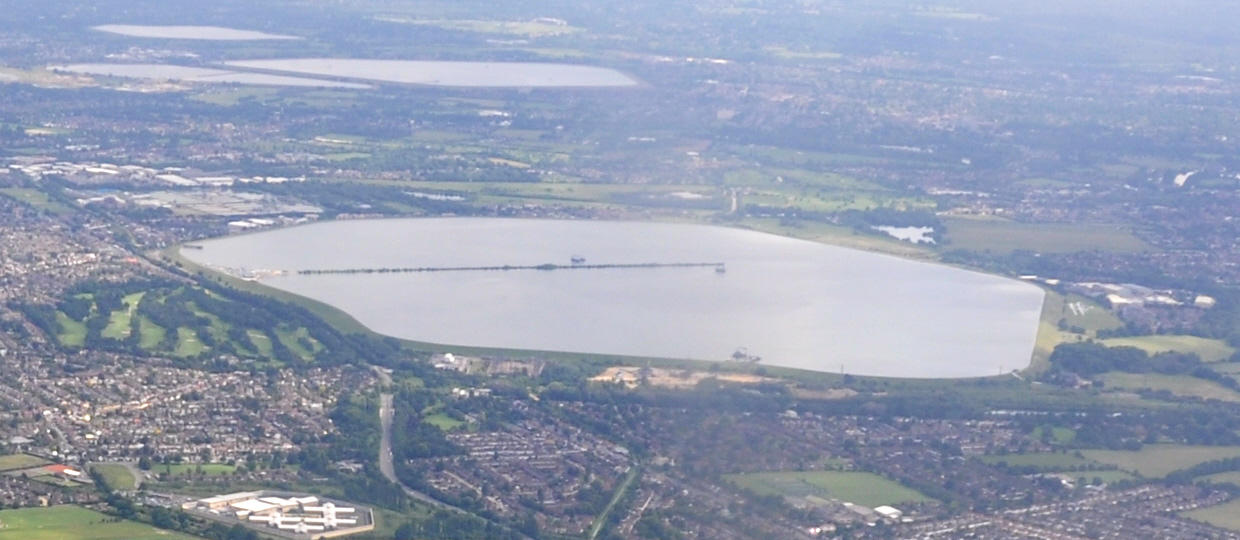

- Location within Surrey
- Location: Surrey
- Coordinates: 51°25′N 0°27′W
- Type: reservoir
- Basin countries: United Kingdom
- Surface area: 2.8 km^{2} (1.1 sq mi)
- Water volume: 30.6 Gl (6.7×10^{9} imp gal)

The Queen Mary Reservoir is one of the largest of London's reservoirs supplying fresh water to London and parts of surrounding counties, and is located in the Borough of Spelthorne in Surrey. The reservoir covers 707 acres (2.86 km^{2}) and is 45 ft (14 m) above the surrounding area.

== Location ==
Queen Mary Reservoir is located south of Ashford and east of Laleham. It lies south of the A308 and at its closest point 0.25 miles (0.40 km) northwest of the M3 motorway. Heathrow airport is 3.7 miles north of the reservoir.

The reservoir was formerly designated as being in the county of Middlesex. In 1965 Staines and Sunbury-on-Thames Urban Districts were transferred to the county of Surrey. The Borough of Spelthorne was formed in 1974 incorporating Staines and Sunbury-on-Thames Urban Districts. The reservoir is now designated as part of the county of Surrey.

== History ==
Construction of the Littleton Reservoir was authorised under the provisions of the Metropolitan Water Board (Various Powers) Act 1921 (11 & 12 Geo. 5, c.cxv). It was designed by the Board’s Chief Engineer Henry Stilgoe (1867-1943) and was completed in December 1924. Some sources state that the reservoir was designed by John Watson Gibson for the Metropolitan Water Board. It was formally opened by King George V in June 1925 as the Queen Mary Reservoir, renamed for the Queen Consort, Mary of Teck; a plaque commemorates the event. It was the largest reservoir in the world at that time.

In 1943, during World War II, the reservoir was used for testing submersibles. The submersible was nicknamed "Sleeping Beauty". In 2010 Prince Philip visited the reservoir to unveil a modern replica of the submersibles tested here. The model is on display at the Eden Camp museum near Malton, North Yorkshire.

== Structure ==
The reservoir embankment has a puddle clay core extending down into the underlying London Clay and gravel/earth shoulders at a slope of 1 in 3. The top of the embankment is 12 m above the surrounding land. The key engineering parameters are:

Queen Mary Reservoir
Parameter	Value
Maximum embankment height	12 m
Length of Embankment	6,324 m
Total capacity	30.4 million m^{3} 30,400 megalitres
Surface area	2.863 km^{2}
Inflow capacity	770 Ml/d
Emergency drawdown	0.75 metres within 24hrs

The reservoir has a 1 km central gravel/earth embankment breakwater running north–south and designed to reduce wave action.

== Operation ==
Water is abstracted from the River Thames downstream of Penton Hook Weir at up to 200,000,000 imp gal (910,000,000 L; 240,000,000 US gal) and flows via the 1.26 km Laleham Aqueduct to a pumping station (51°24'56.0"N 0°28'36.9"W) at the western embankment of the reservoir. The pumping station lifts water into the reservoir. An outlet tower is located adjacent to the north-east embankment (51°25'17.4"N 0°26'57.1"W). Water is discharged into the Staines Reservoirs Aqueduct which runs round the north of the reservoir to the Kempton Park and Hampton water treatment works.

The water quality changes which took place during reservoir storage are as follows.

Water quality before and after storage in Queen Mary reservoir
Quarter	Source	Ammoniacal Nitrogen mg/l	Albumin Nitrogen mg/l	Nitrate mg/l	Phosphate mg/l	Turbidity units	Agar colony count per ml.	E. Coli number per 100 ml.
March to May	River Thames before storage	0.25	0.23	4.7	1.8	18	5387	5298
March to May	Queen Mary reservoir outlet	0.09	0.16	4.1	1.7	4	212	50
June to August	River Thames before storage	0.12	0.25	3.9	2.3	19	1880	2576
June to August	Queen Mary reservoir outlet	0.06	0.16	3.5	1.9	10	137	5
Sept. to Nov.	River Thames before storage	0.27	0.24	4.0	2.4	17	6520	4850
Sept. to Nov.	Queen Mary reservoir outlet	0.18	0.15	2.8	2.1	2	197	104
Dec. to February	River Thames before storage	0.31	0.26	4.6	2.1	31	9737	5288
Dec. to February	Queen Mary reservoir outlet	0.12	0.15	4.0	1.8	1	126	136

The Metropolitan Water Board operated the reservoir until the Board was abolished in 1974 under the provisions of the Water Act 1973 (c. 37) ownership and control transferred to the Thames Water Authority. Under the provisions of the Water Act 1989 (c. 15) the Thames Water Authority was privatised as Thames Water.

Sand and gravel were formerly dredged from the reservoir, making the bottom uneven and affecting water circulation. In 2008 Thames Water digitally modelled the bottom to identify high points where aggregates could be removed. Planning approval was given to remove 1.25 million tonnes of aggregate and two-thirds of the breakwater. This increased the reservoir capacity by 1.26 percent. A jetty and aggregate processing facility was constructed on the west side of the reservoir just north of the intake.

The emergency drawdown rate (the rate at which the water level in the reservoir can be reduced) was about 0.25 metres/day. Inspections in 2005-07 identified that this was inadequate, and proposed that the drawdown should be 0.75 m/d as defined in the provisions of the Reservoirs Act 1975. This was achieved by installing twin 1.6 m diameter siphon pipes over the embankment. The valves controlling the outflow are 13 m high and have a flow capacity of 13 m^{3}/s. The discharge pipes are 250 m long and discharge into the Laleham Aqueduct, returning water to the Thames.

The reservoir and the land to the west are designated Sites of Nature Conservation Importance, covering some 360 ha and noted for their varied bird life.

The Queen Mary Sailing Club is a members sailing club on the reservoir. It owns a subsidiary company Queen Mary Sailsports, bringing all training operations "in house".

== See also ==
- London water supply infrastructure
