= Peter Morice =

Peter Morice (died 1588; - also sometimes spelt Morrys, Morris or Maurice) was a Dutch-born (some accounts describe him as a German) engineer who developed one of the first pumped water supply systems for the City of London. In London, his first pumps were powered by an undershot waterwheel housed in the northernmost arches of London Bridge, spanning the tidal River Thames.

== Early London water supply ==
Until the late 16th century, London citizens were reliant for their water supplies on water from either the River Thames, its tributaries, or one of around a dozen natural springs, including the spring at Tyburn which was connected by lead pipe to a large cistern or tank (then known as a Conduit): the Great Conduit in Cheapside. So that water was not removed for unauthorised commercial or industrial purposes, the city authorities appointed keepers of the conduits who would ensure that users such as brewers, cooks and fishmongers would pay for the water they used. Wealthy Londoners living near the a conduit pipe could obtain permission for a connection to their homes, but this did not prevent unauthorised tapping of conduits. Otherwise - particularly for households which could not take a gravity-feed - water from the conduits was provided to individual households by water carriers, or "cobs", or was taken directly from the Thames or from its tributary streams.

== The Morice Waterwheels ==
In 1580, Morice applied to city officials for permission to construct a waterwheel and pumps - also known as a forcier - under an arch of London Bridge to supply culinary water to the city. After an impressive demonstration of the power of his pump (he forced a jet of water over the spire of the Church of St Magnus near London Bridge), he was granted a 500-year lease, at an annual rent of just 10 shillings, on one arch, despite opposition from the city's water carriers. This lease was later (c.1584 and 1701) extended to include additional arches. Initially, water was lifted to the conduit house in Leadenhall, but was later extended to other areas of the city. Waterwheels were also constructed under London Bridge to grind corn.

Morice's waterwheels and associated machinery were destroyed in the Great Fire of London of 1666 (no description remains), but replacements engineered by his grandson remained under the bridge until the early 19th century. In 1731, a description of the machinery was published in the Philosophical Transactions of the Royal Society. The three waterwheels worked a total of 52 water pumps; the wheels could turn in either direction and so be driven by the flowing and ebbing tide; and the pumps were designed to force 132,120 gallons an hour to a height of 120 feet. "These water-works, a cumbrous-looking structure of wood, stood on the Middlesex side of the Thames, adjoining the bridge, and near the site of Fishmongers' Hall steam-boat pier."

However, the London Bridge Waterworks alone could not supply the growing City of London with all its water supply, and while it continued in use until 1822, its importance soon dwindled in comparison with Sir Hugh Myddleton's New River water supply project. The waterworks was eventually demolished in 1822, being taken over by the New River Company, to allow the construction of the New London Bridge. Just prior to the demolition, the waterworks, supplied 10,417 houses with 26,322,705 hogsheads per annum, at a rental cost of £12,266. The New River Company purchased all London Bridge Waterworks rights and leases for an annuity of £3750, to continue 200 years.
