= Staines Reservoirs =

Storage reservoirs in the United Kingdom

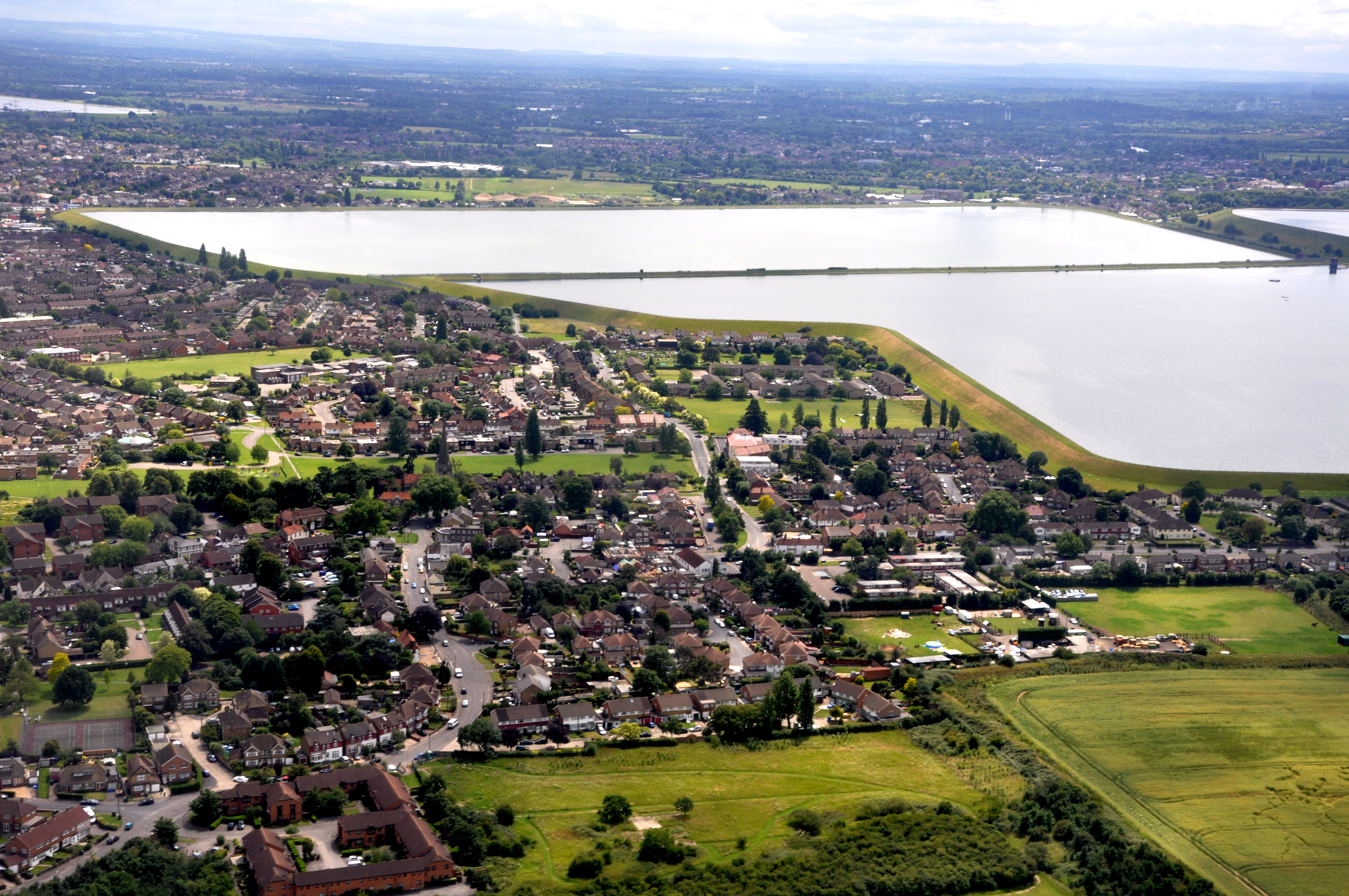
- Stanwell and the Staines Reservoirs in 2011

- Location within Surrey
- Location: Surrey
- Coordinates: 51°26′49″N 0°29′12″W
- Type: reservoir puddle clay embankment
- Primary inflows: 295,496 cubic metres/day
- Primary outflows: 364,000 cubic metres/day
- Catchment area: River Thames
- Basin countries: United Kingdom
- Built: 1902; 124 years ago
- Surface area: 172 ha (430 acres)
- Average depth: Dam walls 6.4–10.67 m (21.0–35.0 ft) high
- Water volume: 15,175,000 m^{3} (535,900,000 cu ft)

The Staines Reservoirs are two large pumped storage reservoirs sitting to the east of the King George VI Reservoir near Heathrow Airport in Surrey within the Colne Valley regional park. The village of Stanwell is mainly to the north east, and the town of Staines is to the south.

Both adjoin, west, the A3044. The south one adjoins the A30 where the road is bypassed by the intra-M25 motorway network but is a trunk road, maintained by National Highways. They were completed in 1902.

== History ==
For reliable and plentiful water supplies, three London water companies resolved to construct and operate two large reservoirs at seasonally waterlogged land partly in the parish of Staines, otherwise in Stanwell. These would be pumped storage reservoirs to hold water abstracted from the Thames receiving it from an aqueduct, then delivering it by another to treatment works for their supply pipes. The three were the New River Company, the Grand Junction Water Company and the West Middlesex Water Company.

Staines Reservoirs, &c. Act 1896
- Act of Parliament
- Parliament of the United Kingdom
- Long title: An Act to authorise the construction of new reservoirs at Staines and other works for affording an additional supply of Water for certain districts north of the River Thames and for other purposes.
- Citation: 59 & 60 Vict. c.ccxli
- Territorial extent: United Kingdom

Dates
- Royal assent: 14 August 1896
- Commencement: 14 August 1896 (Note: The Acts of Parliament (Commencement) Act 1793.)

Other legislation
- Amended by: Staines Reservoirs Act 1898; Staines Reservoirs (Amendment) Act 1901; Thames Conservancy Act 1911

Status: Amended

Staines Reservoirs Act 1898 (Note: Section 1.)
- Act of Parliament
- Parliament of the United Kingdom
- Long title: An Act to authorise the Staines Reservoirs Joint Committee to execute further Works to amend in certain respects the Staines Reservoirs &c. Act 1896 and for other purposes.
- Citation: 61 & 62 Vict. c. civ
- Territorial extent: United Kingdom

Dates
- Royal assent: 25 July 1898
- Commencement: 25 July 1898

Other legislation
- Amends: Staines Reservoirs, &c. Act 1896
- Amended by: Staines Reservoirs (Amendment) Act 1901

Status: Amended

Text of statute as originally enacted

Staines Reservoirs (Amendment) Act 1901
- Act of Parliament
- Parliament of the United Kingdom
- Long title: An Act to extend the provisions of the Staines Reservoirs Acts of 1896 and 1898 relating to the purchase of the undertakings of certain Metropolitan Water Companies by any public body or trustees.
- Citation: 1 Edw. 7. c. cxxxii
- Territorial extent: United Kingdom

Dates
- Royal assent: 26 July 1901
- Commencement: 26 July 1901

Other legislation
- Amends: Staines Reservoirs, &c. Act 1896; Staines Reservoirs Act 1898

Status: Current legislation

To obtain full indemnity and a compulsory purchase mechanism they promoted the Staines Reservoir Bill of 1896. The bill was opposed by some landowners, as well as London County Council and Middlesex County Council. Nevertheless, the bill was enacted, with amendments, as the Staines Reservoirs, &c. Act 1896 (59 & 60 Vict. c.ccxli). The companies formed a joint committee to oversee the construction. The two reservoirs, North and South, are separated by a 1,030-metre embankment dam. The embankments of the two have a 6- to 8-metre-deep puddle clay core having scoured out the surface gravel to the underlying London Clay. They have total capacity of 3,338 million gallons (15.175 million m^{3}) and were completed in 1902. The valve towers are to the west.

Later in the same year of building the three companies, and seven others, dissolved into the Metropolitan Water Board – under the Metropolis Water Act 1902.

== Operation ==
The reservoirs are filled from the Staines Reservoirs Aqueduct, built as part of the works. Water was originally lifted from the aqueduct to the reservoirs by five steam driven engines, each with a capacity of 16 million gallons per day (72,737 m^{3}/day). The engines were housed in Staines pumping station south-west of the south reservoir. Under the original legal provisions, when the flow of the river at Bell Weir exceeded 265 million gallons a day (1.205 million m^{3}/d) the joint company could abstract any surplus up to 100 million gallons (454,609 m^{3}) of which 35 million gallons (159,113 m^{3}) could be run directly to the filter beds at Hampton and the surplus (295,496 m^{3}/day) pumped into the reservoirs. The top water level in the North Reservoir is 3 m higher than the South reservoir. Water for treatment and use is drawn from the reservoirs through the valve towers and delivered to the aqueduct to flow south-east to several water treatment works.

The Metropolitan Water Board operated the reservoirs until the board was abolished in 1974 under the provisions of the Water Act 1973 and ownership and control transferred to the Thames Water Authority, now Thames Water.

In 1992, there was a proposal to increase the capacity of the reservoirs by raising the height of the dam walls and removing the dividing embankment. The work was estimated to take up to six years to complete.

From April 2020, a sheet pile cut-off wall was installed in two places to prevent leakage of water through the core of the south reservoir's embankment.

The area has been designated a Site of Special Scientific Interest (SSSI) as it carries important wintering populations of tufted ducks, pochard, goosander and goldeneye.

== Staines Reservoirs Aqueduct ==
The Staines Reservoirs Aqueduct is a 13 km (8.1 mi) aqueduct that runs from the River Thames at Hythe End in Buckinghamshire (51°26′24.4″N 0°32′28.8″W) to the Red House distribution reservoir (51°25′11.6″N 0°23′20.4″W) near Kempton Park. It was built by the Staines Reservoirs Joint Committee and originally completed in 1902. The maximum flow capacity of the aqueduct is 364 million litres per day (364,000 m^{3}/day).

Water is drawn from the north side of the Thames about 300 yards above Bell Weir, at a decorative sluice house. This is provided with sluices to control the flow and screens to prevent debris entering the aqueduct. The water runs underground for about 350 yards in a north-east direction, it then flows in two steel siphons under the Colne Brook. It continues in a concrete lined open conduit, before going under the Wraysbury river in steel siphons, then east across Staines Moor and another siphon under the River Colne to Staines pumping station. From here water is lifted into the Staines and King George VI reservoirs by pumps.

Water for treatment and use is drawn from the Staines and King George VI Reservoirs and flows along the Staines Reservoirs Aqueduct in an east-south-east direction to Ashford, then around the north side of Queen Mary Reservoir, water discharged from the reservoir enters the aqueduct at this point. The aqueduct continues across Ashford Common with a connection to Ashford Common water treatment works and then across Sunbury Common. From Sunbury Common the aqueduct changes direction to the north-east, it curves around the north side of Kempton Park race course with connections to Sunbury and Kempton Park water treatment works, and flows in a south-east direction into the Red House distribution reservoir (51°25'11.6"N 0°23'20.4"W). From here a pipeline and an open aqueduct takes water south to the reservoirs at the west end of Hampton waterworks. From 1916 experiments were undertaken to pre-treat the water in the aqueduct with chlorine added to the water from the Staines reservoirs.

To increase the supply of water the aqueduct was paralleled underground in the 1960s by the Staines–Kempton aqueduct tunnel. This was built by the Metropolitan Water Board between 1960–63 and runs from Little Hythe on the Thames to the water treatment works at Kempton Park. It is 7.64 kilometres (4.75 mi) long and 2.4 metres (7 ft 10 in) in diameter. The tunnel is lined with 150,000 expanded concrete wedge blocks. The contractors for the project were Edmund Nuttall, Sons and Company Limited.

In February 2014, after a sustained period of heavy rain, the River Thames was at a high level that caused water to back up in the River Colne. This then spilt into the Staines Reservoirs Aqueduct, which channelled the water to Staines. The aqueduct spilt over into the River Ash, which overtopped its banks and flooded about 80 houses in the Leacroft and Priory Green areas and damaged the aqueduct.

== See also ==
- London water supply infrastructure
