= Queen Elizabeth II Reservoir =

Reservoir in South East England

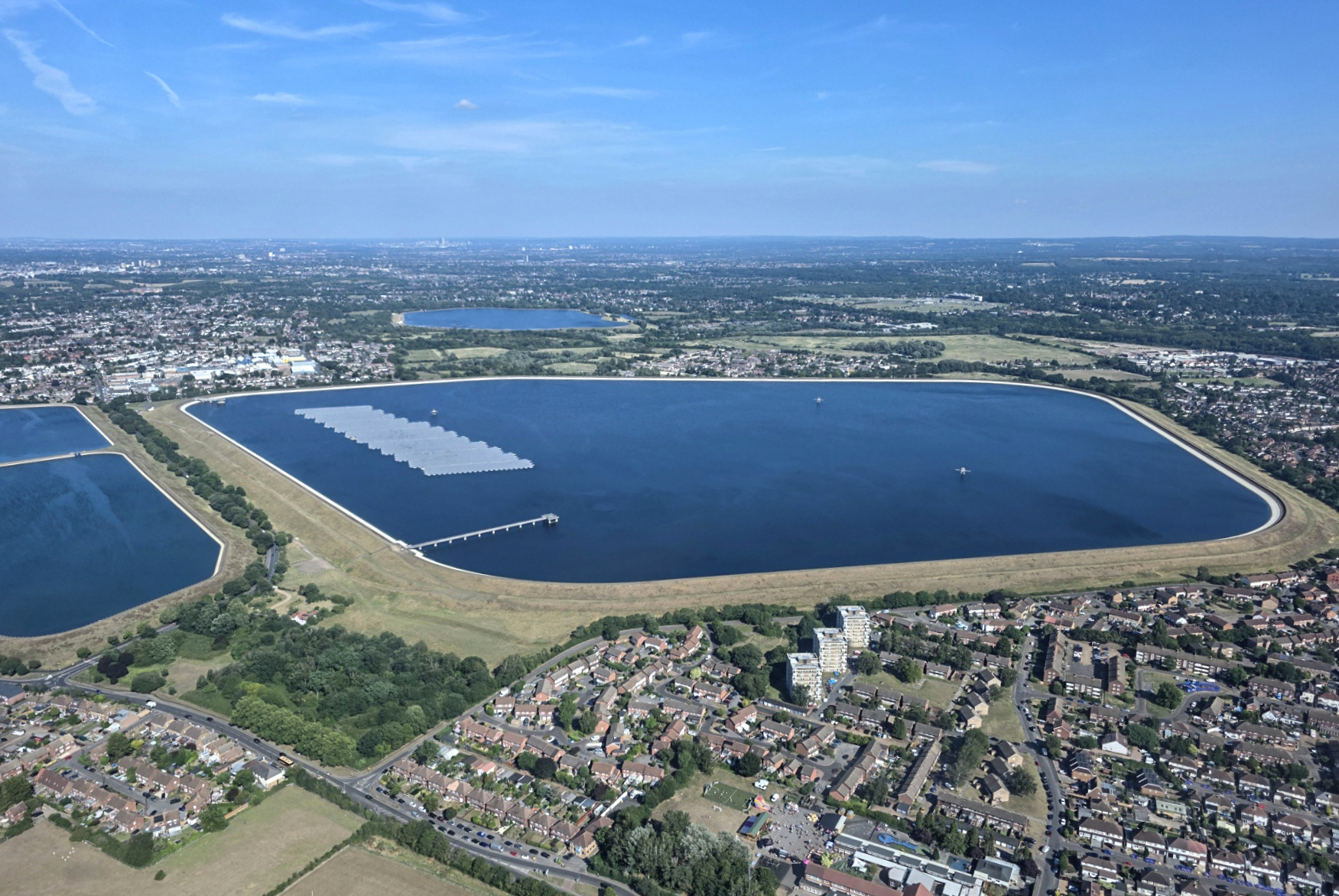
- The reservoir from the north-west

- Location within Surrey
- Location: Surrey
- Coordinates: 51°23′27″N 0°23′32″W
- Type: reservoir
- Basin countries: United Kingdom
- Surface area: 127.9 ha (316 acres)
- Average depth: 15.3 m (50 ft)
- Max. depth: 17.8 m (58 ft)
- Water volume: 19.5 Gl (4.3×10^{9} imp gal)

The Queen Elizabeth II Reservoir lies to the south of the River Thames and to the west of the Island Barn Reservoir. To the north are the Bessborough and Knight reservoirs. The reservoir is in Walton on Thames and is managed by Thames Water.

== History ==
The Queen Elizabeth II Reservoir was authorised by the Metropolitan Water Board Act 1935 (25 & 26 Geo. 5. c. lxxxiv). Excavation work on the reservoir started in 1936 under the supervision of the board's chief engineer, Jonathan Davidson, but was suspended at the start of the Second World War in 1939. Work only recommenced in 1957 and was undertaken by W. & C. French. The reservoir was completed in 1962 and was formally opened by the Queen on 30 March 1962.

=== Construction ===
The reservoir embankment has a rolled clay core which extends down into the under-lying blue London clay. The core wall is 3.6 metres (12 ft) wide at the base and tapers above ground level to 3 metres (9.8 ft) wide at the top of the wall. The clay was taken from three borrow pits. On both sides of the core is a fill of mixed clay and gravel 0.9 metres (2 ft 11 in) wide. The reservoir walls were constructed by dragging gravel from the floor of the reservoir but which was not compacted other than compaction by the construction machinery. The top of the embankment is 15 metres (49 ft) above ground level. Over the London clay is about 6 metres (20 ft) of sandy gravel. A study in 2009 identified that about 750,000 tonnes of sand and gravel could be excavated from the bottom of the reservoir.

The inlet and outlet valve towers are located at the north east and north west corners of the reservoir. The inlet and outlet tunnels are 2.5 metres (8.2 ft) in diameter and run beneath the Knight and Bessborough reservoirs, nearby roads and houses to the Walton Water Treatment Works. The inlet tunnel is 1,035 metres (3,396 ft) long and the outlet tunnel is 795 metres (2,608 ft) long.

=== Operation ===
The water quality changes which took place during reservoir storage are as follows. (Note: this data is nearly 50 years old, is it relevant any more?)

Water quality before and after storage in Queen Elizabeth II reservoir (as published in 1977)
| Quarter | Source | Ammoniacal nitrogen mg/l | Albumin nitrogen mg/l | Nitrate mg/l | Phosphate mg/l | Turbidity units | Agar colony count per ml | E. coli number per 100 ml |
|---|---|---|---|---|---|---|---|---|
| March to May | River Thames before storage | 0.25 | 0.23 | 4.7 | 1.8 | 18 | 5387 | 5298 |
| March to May | Queen Elizabeth II reservoir outlet | 0.1 | 0.14 | 4.8 | 1.9 | 2 | 97 | 28 |
| June to August | River Thames before storage | 0.12 | 0.25 | 3.9 | 2.3 | 19 | 1880 | 2576 |
| June to August | Queen Elizabeth II reservoir outlet | 0.09 | 0.16 | 4.5 | 1.79 | 2 | 2198 | 5 |
| Sept. to Nov. | River Thames before storage | 0.27 | 0.24 | 4.0 | 2.4 | 17 | 6520 | 4850 |
| Sept. to Nov. | Queen Elizabeth II reservoir outlet | 0.04 | 0.15 | 3.5 | 1.9 | 1 | 580 | 382 |
| Dec. to February | River Thames before storage | 0.31 | 0.26 | 4.6 | 2.1 | 31 | 9737 | 5288 |
| Dec. to February | Queen Elizabeth II reservoir outlet | 0.08 | 0.14 | 4.5 | 1.9 | 2 | 170 | 160 |

=== Ownership ===
The Metropolitan Water Board operated the reservoir until the Board was abolished in 1974 under the provisions of the Water Act 1973 (c. 37) ownership and control was transferred to the Thames Water Authority. Under the provisions of the Water Act 1989 (c. 15) the Thames Water Authority was privatised as Thames Water.

=== Dimensions ===
The reservoir covers 128 ha (317 acres), has a mean depth of 15.3 metres (50 ft), a maximum depth of 17.8 metres (58 ft) and holds 4,300 million gallons (20,000 million litres). The height of the embankment walls above ground level is 15 metres (49 ft), and the perimeter is 4,400 m (14,400 ft).

== Environment ==
Bewick's swans have been spotted on this reservoir. In the winter of 1963 100,000 gulls were counted roosting at the reservoir. Little auks, red-necked phalarope, Bonaparte's gulls, roseate terns, pomarine skuas and shore larks have also been spotted at this reservoir. As of 2020 Thames Water are reviewing the access arrangements for all three of the Walton reservoirs, The design of the reservoir has an effect on the fish population that can live in the reservoir, the concrete shores means that only European perch and ruffe can breed, except for where there are empty fish cages constructed with netting, which support some plant growth and this allows small numbers of cyprinid fish to breed. The low numbers of fish in the reservoir have led to the zooplankton being dominated by large-sized water fleas and Daphnia and to high growth rates in the few fish that live there. No fishing is permitted at the reservoir.

== Solar panels ==
In March 2016 Thames Water commissioned a farm of solar panels on the reservoir which at the time was the world's largest floating solar farm. It consists of over 23,000 panels covering one tenth of the reservoir's surface. generating 6.3 MW of power, enough to power approximately 1,800 homes. The solar farm is expected to offset Thames Water's energy expenses used to power their nearby water treatment and pumping stations.

== See also ==
Media related to Queen Elizabeth II Reservoir at Wikimedia Commons

- London water supply infrastructure
