= Bessborough Reservoir =

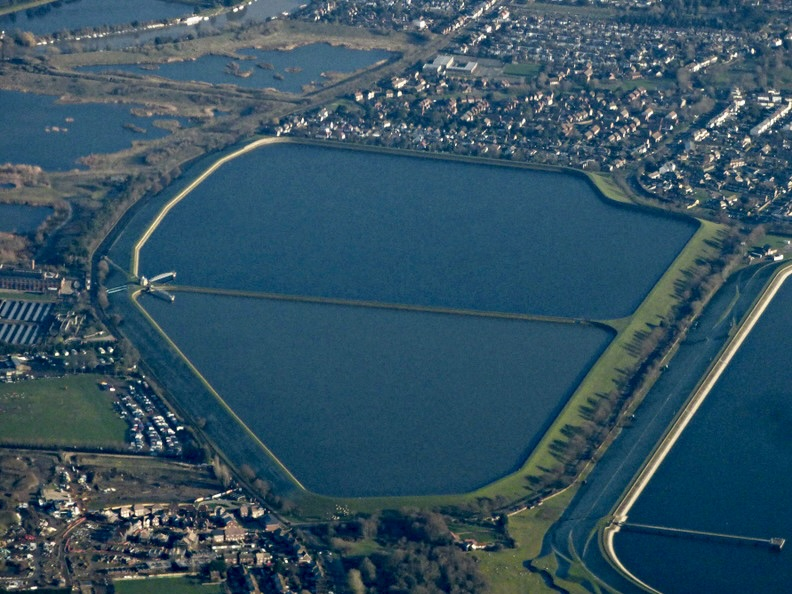
- Bessborough Reservoir (furthest from the camera) and Knight Reservoir from the west

- Location within Surrey
- Location: Surrey
- Coordinates: 51°24′5.9″N 0°23′10.1″W
- Type: reservoir
- Basin countries: United Kingdom
- Water volume: 5.45 Gl (1.20×10^{9} imp gal)

The Bessborough Reservoir is an embanked storage reservoir south of the River Thames in Surrey adjacent to the Knight Reservoir. To the south lies Queen Elizabeth II Reservoir and to the north the now disused Molesey Reservoirs. The A3050 runs to the north of the reservoir and the neighbouring town is Molesey to the east. It forms part the green buffer between Molesey and Walton on Thames. The reservoir is in the borough of Elmbridge.

== History ==
The Bessborough and Knight Reservoirs were initially built by the Southwark and Vauxhall Waterworks Company, whose works were across the river at Hampton. Construction began in 1898 replacing an old mansion and its farmed or landscaped estate, a manor, named Apps Court. The reservoirs were finished by the Metropolitan Water Board which had assumed responsibility for water supplies in London from 1902. The reservoirs were opened in 1907, and have a combined area of 125.5 acres (0.508 km^{2}) and hold 1,198 million imperial gallons (5,450,000 m^{3}).

The key details of the Knight and Bessborough reservoirs are as follows.

Parameter	Knight Reservoir	Bessborough Reservoir
Capacity	2,180 Mega litres	3,260 Ml
Surface area	20.8 ha	30 ha
Perimeter	1,800 m	2,000 m
Total excavation	1.15 million cubic metres	
Puddle clay used	153,000 cubic metres	
Concrete	57,000 cubic metres	

The embankment walls have a puddle clay core extending down to the underlying blue London clay.

For details of construction and operation see Knight reservoir.

== Apps Court ==
The last noble owner was John, Duke of Montagu, from 1709 until 1749 who died without surviving male issue in that year.

Either the son or the grandson of late 18th-century landowner Jeremiah Hodges, Colonel Hodges sold the manor in 1802 to Edmund Hill who finally bequeathed it on his death to John Hamborough, after whose death it was sold by the trustees of his estate to Richard Sharpe. Robert Gill bought it before 1867 and his widow took it after his death.

It was sold in 1898–1899 to the Southwark and Vauxhall Water Company, who pulled down the house, and "excavated [what is described in the Victoria County History of 1912 as] the whole estate for a reservoir". A barrel of ale, and a quarter of corn made into bread, were still in the 19th century distributed annually to the poor by the owners of the property on All Souls' Day in respect of their customary tenure. The water company tried to evade the tenure, but on petition of the tenant farmers, the Charity Commissioners sanctioned a scheme in 1903, by which the interest of £200 equivalent to £21,025 in 2025 paid by the Water Board was vested in trustees for the use of the poor of Walton and Molesey.

== Present use of the Apps Court Estate ==
The site is managed and operated by Thames Water.

Much of the farm of the estate remains by the road running parallel to and closest to the River Thames, and is used as a car boot sale location, the owners host the August fireworks event that coincides with Sunbury regatta.

Knight and Bessborough Reservoirs are a Site of Special Scientific Interest.

== See also ==
- London water supply infrastructure
