= Knight Reservoir =

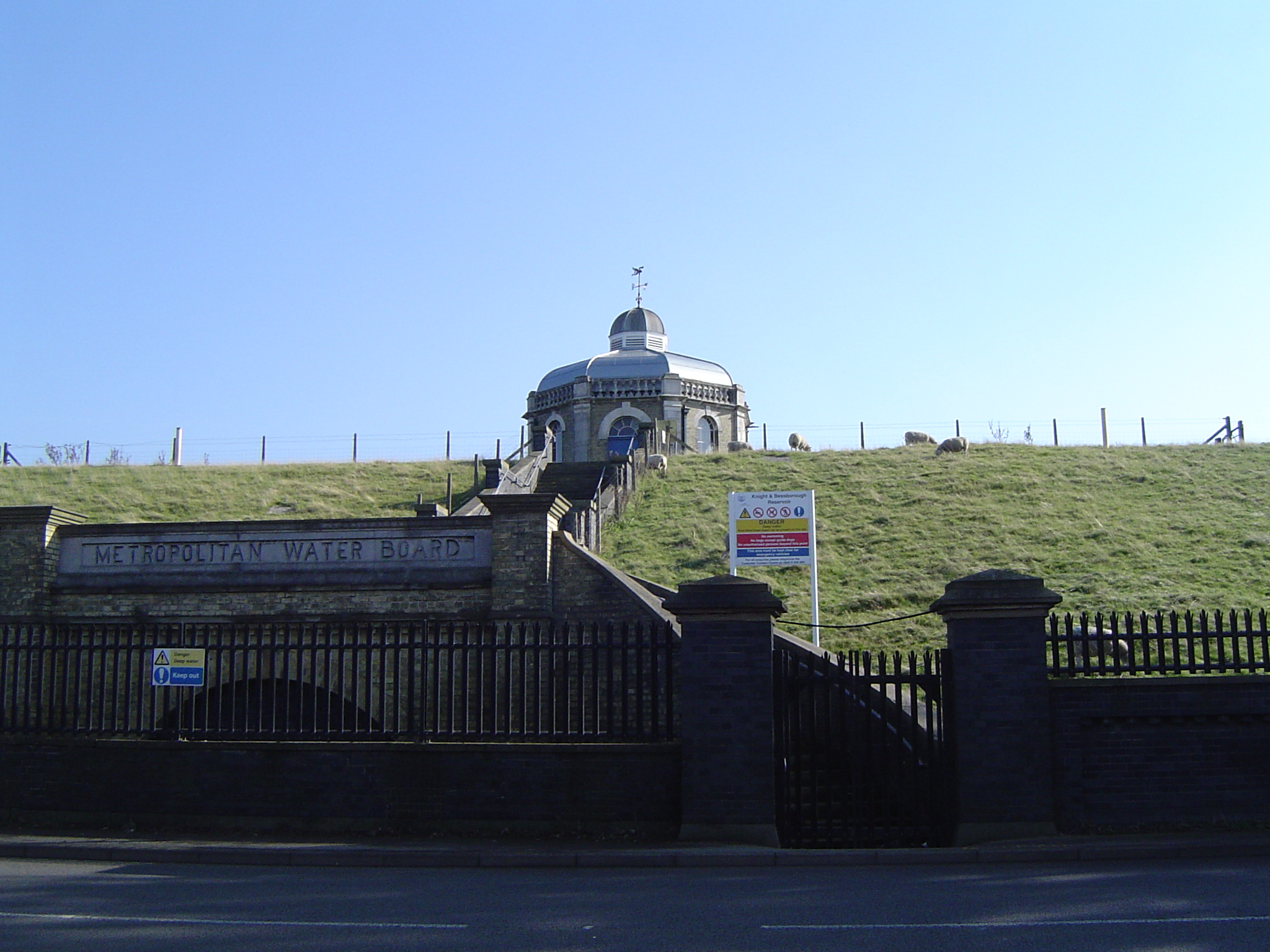
- Input station for Knight and Bessborough Reservoirs

- Location within Surrey
- Location: Surrey
- Coordinates: 51°23′56.6″N 0°23′36.2″W
- Type: reservoir
- Basin countries: United Kingdom
- Surface area: 50.5 ha (125 acres)
- Water volume: 5.46 Gl (1.20×10^{9} imp gal)

The Knight Reservoir is a large pumped storage reservoir located in the Borough of Elmbridge in Surrey. It was inaugurated in 1907 and stores up to 2,180 million litres of raw water abstracted from the River Thames prior to its treatment and supply to London and north Surrey. It is located south of the River Thames, west of West Molesey, and between Hurst Road (A3050) and Walton Road (B369). It is adjacent to, and west of, its twin Bessborough Reservoir.

== History ==
In 1898 the Southwark and Vauxhall Waterworks Company operated a water works at Hampton, Middlesex. To increase the raw water storage capacity the company sought legal powers to construct two reservoirs across the river from the Hampton works. This was achieved through the provisions of the Southwark and Vauxhall Water Act 1898 (61 & 62 Vict. c. cxv) which empowered the company to build two storage reservoirs; an intake from the river Thames; a pump house, and filter beds. Work began in 1898 on the site of an old mansion called Apps Court.

Construction was incomplete when, in 1902, the Metropolitan Water Board (MWB) was formed under the terms of the Metropolitan Water Act 1902 (2 Edw. 7. c.41). The MWB took over the assets of several companies including the Southwark and Vauxhall Waterworks Company and the partly built reservoirs at Walton.

The MWB continued the construction and the reservoirs were inaugurated in 1907.

== Specification ==
The Knight and Bessborough reservoirs have a combined area of 125.5 acres (0.508 km^{2}) and hold 1,198 million gallons. Other key details of the reservoirs are as follows.

Parameter	Knight Reservoir	Bessborough Reservoir
Capacity	2,180 Mega litres	3,260 Ml
Surface area	20.8 ha	30 ha
Perimeter	1,800 m	2,000 m
Total excavation	1.15 million cubic metres	
Puddle clay used	153,000 cubic metres	
Concrete	57,000 cubic metres	

The embankment walls of the reservoirs have a puddle clay core extending down to the underlying blue London clay.

The inlet pipes and water discharge tower are adjacent to the north embankment.

Water from the reservoirs was piped under the river and flowed by gravity to the filter beds at Hampton Water Works.

The Metropolitan Water Board operated the reservoirs until the Board was abolished in 1974 under the provisions of the Water Act 1973 (c. 37). Ownership and control was transferred to the Thames Water Authority (TWA). The water supply industry was privatised in 1989, and the TWA became Thames Water.

Knight and Bessborough Reservoirs are a Site of Special Scientific Interest.

== Operations ==
Water was abstracted from the river Thames through an open intake channel (139 m long, 6.7 m wide, with a water depth of 2.4 m) and pumped into the reservoirs. There were four lift pumps which were originally driven by triple-expansion steam engines each rated at 373 kW at 135 rpm. Each engine was coupled to a two-stage centrifugal pump capable of delivering 114 million litres/day. The reservoirs allowed some settlement of suspended solids, biological cleaning through exposure to sunlight, and provided a buffer storage volume to maintain capacity at times of low flow in the river.

The water quality changes which took place during reservoir storage are as follows.

Water quality before and after storage in Walton reservoirs
Quarter	Source	Ammoniacal Nitrogen mg/l	Albumin Nitrogen mg/l	Nitrate mg/l	Phosphate mg/l	Turbidity units	Agar colony number per ml.	E. Coli number per 100 ml.
March to May	River Thames before storage	0.25	0.23	4.7	1.8	18	5387	5298
March to May	Walton reservoir outlet	0.26	0.16	4.8	1.6	5	236	55
June to August	River Thames before storage	0.12	0.25	3.9	2.3	19	1880	2576
June to August	Walton reservoir outlet	0.21	0.17	3.8	2.1	3	68	7
Sept. to Nov.	River Thames before storage	0.27	0.24	4.0	2.4	17	6520	4850
Sept. to Nov.	Walton reservoir outlet	0.24	0.17	3.8	2.3	3	226	87
Dec. to February	River Thames before storage	0.31	0.26	4.6	2.1	31	9737	5288
Dec. to February	Walton reservoir outlet	0.23	0.14	4.6	1.8	4	324	108

As originally conceived water from the reservoirs was piped under the river and flowed by gravity to the filter beds at Hampton Water Works. The difference in level between the reservoirs and the filter beds was 9.7 m. The flow of water drove three hydraulic turbines coupled to centrifugal pumps which were used to lift river water into the reservoirs. In addition to the Knight and Bessborough reservoirs there were four smaller rectangular reservoirs (each 750 ft by 550 ft, 229 m by 167 m) located east of the intake channel.

In the 1920s a water treatment works was constructed to the north of the reservoirs. By 1933 this comprised six slow sand filters (each 220 ft by 170 ft, 67 m by 52 m) located west of the intake channel.

In 1926 the steam engines were converted to single cylinder triple expansion steam pumps and steam turbines. Further filter beds were added in 1950 west of the pump house.

Further plant was added as the demand for water grew, and when the Queen Elizabeth II reservoir was commissioned in 1962. The steam engines were replaced with electric motors in 1964.

=== See also ===
- London water supply infrastructure
- Walton water treatment works
