= Brimsdown Industrial Estate =

Coordinates: 51.655665°N 0.024526°W

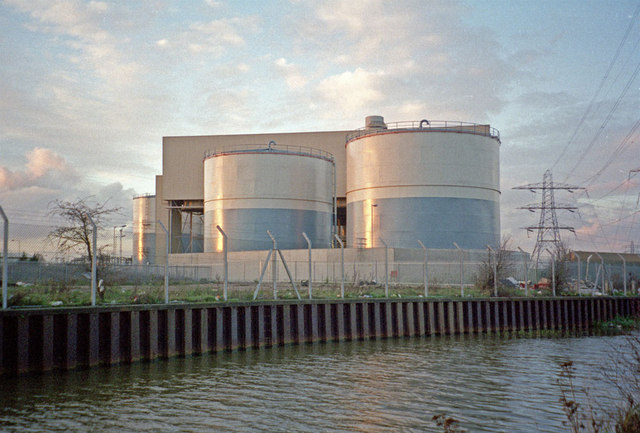
View from the River Lee Navigation

Brimsdown Industrial Estate is located to the east of the residential part of Brimsdown in the London Borough of Enfield. The estate, which lies in the Lea Valley, is bordered to the west by the West Anglia Main Line portion of the Lea Valley Lines and to the east by the River Lea and King George V Reservoir. A number of businesses are located here including Warburtons Enfield bakery, warehousing and retail, and heavier industry such as Johnson Matthey, UOP and the Enfield Power Station.

== History ==
The original, coal-fired Brimsdown Power Station was built by the North Metropolitan Electric Power Supply Company (Northmet) in 1907. By the time of its closure in the 1970s this had grown to be a major plant, visible from a wide area due to its seven large cooling towers. Manufacturers attracted to Brimsdown by electricity supply and flat sites included non-ferrous metals producers Enfield Rolling Mills (ERM) and Enfield Cables Ltd (both later part of Detal Metals). Other firms included Brimsdown Castings (manufacturing in brass, copper, phosphor bronze, zinc and aluminium), Johnson Matthey (precious metals), Brimsdown Lead Works, Ruberoid roofing materials, and Imperial Lampworks (later Thorn A.E.I. Radio Valves & Tubes).

In 1965 the ERM plant consisted of a copper refinery, copper and brass sheet and strip mills, copper rodmill, and copper drawing mill. Copper and copper-base alloys produced are cast and fabricated into refinery and mill shapes.
