= Robert Wynne-Edwards =

British civil engineer and army officer

- Born: 1 May 1897; Cheltenham, Gloucestershire
- Died: 22 June 1974 (aged 77); Southport, Lancashire
- Education: Christ Church, Oxford
- Spouse: Hope Elizabeth Day Fletcher
- Children: One son, three daughters
- Engineering career
- Discipline: Civil
- Institutions: Institution of Civil Engineers (president), Institution of Structural Engineers (hon member), American Society of Civil Engineers (hon member)
- Projects: Detroit-Windsor Tunnel, William Girling Reservoir

Sir Robert Meredydd Wynne-Edwards CBE, DSO, MC and bar (1 May 1897 – 22 June 1974) was a British civil engineer and army officer. Wynne-Edwards was born in Cheltenham and educated at Giggleswick School and Leeds Grammar School before being commissioned into the Royal Welch Fusiliers at the outbreak of the First World War. He served on the Western Front in France where he received a Mention in Despatches, Distinguished Service Order and a Military Cross and bar for his gallantry and leadership. Following the war he studied engineering at Christ Church, Oxford from which he graduated with second class honours in 1921.

Wynne-Edwards emigrated to Canada working on several contracts in Vancouver including the Detroit–Windsor Tunnel. He returned to Britain in 1935 following a slump in the Canadian building industry and joined John Mowlem & Co. where he was given the task of constructing the William Girling Reservoir. The newly constructed dam later collapsed and Wynne-Edwards enlisted the expertise of the Building Research Station and Karl von Terzaghi to prove that he was not at fault. During the Second World War Wynne-Edwards was seconded to the Ministry of Works where he became their director of plant.

After the war Wynne-Edwards was managing director of Richard Costain Ltd, specialising in pipelaying and also served on several boards and committees for the British Government. For this latter role he was appointed Commander of the Order of the British Empire. Wynne-Edwards was also involved with the Institution of Civil Engineers serving on many committees and being elected their one hundredth president in 1964. He was knighted in the Queen's Birthday Honours of 1965.

== Early life ==
Wynne-Edwards was born on 1 May 1897 in Cheltenham to Reverend John Rosindale Wynne-Edwards, canon of Ripon Cathedral and schoolmaster (later headmaster) of Leeds Grammar School, and his wife Lilian Agnes Streatfield Welbank. Robert was the eldest of their four sons and two daughters. Robert was educated at Giggleswick School and Leeds Grammar School.

== First World War ==
At the start of the First World War in July 1914 Wynne-Edwards joined the Royal Army Medical Corps, obtaining a commission in the Royal Welch Fusiliers in October 1914. From December 1915 he served on active duty in France and was Mentioned in Despatches. Wynn-Edwards was awarded the Military Cross on 1 January 1917. He received the Distinguished Service Order on 11 January 1919 for conspicuous gallantry and devotion during an assault in which a neighbouring company was in some difficulty. He reorganised it and captured its objective before returning to his own company of just 35 men and retaking a fortified position from the enemy which had been lost that morning.

Wynne-Edwards was awarded a bar to his Military Cross on 15 February 1919. The award was made for gallantry on the night of 7 October 1918 at Northo Wood. Having located two gaps in the German barbed wire he led his company through them and three belts of uncut wire. The company forced back the enemy and took over a position 400 yards ahead of any other troops on the front. Wynne-Edwards held the position for three hours, though being attacked from all sides. He then single-handedly crawled to an enemy howitzer and removed the sights before returning with some of his men and capturing the gunners.

Wynne-Edwards was seconded from his regiment on 21 December 1918 and attained the rank of temporary major before his demobilisation in January 1919.

== In Canada ==
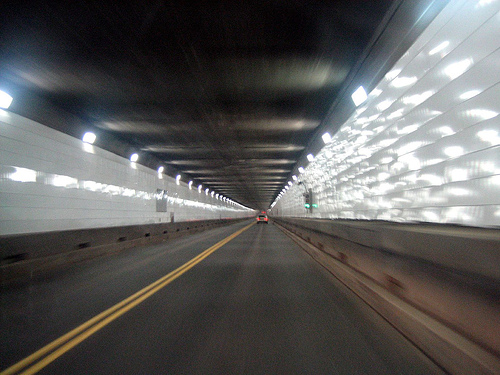
The Detroit-Windsor Tunnel

Upon leaving the army Wynne-Edwards became a student of engineering science at Christ Church, Oxford from which he graduated in 1921 with second class honours. In July of that year he moved to Canada where he was apprenticed to Andrew Don Swan, the consulting engineer to Vancouver Harbour Board. In 1923 he joined Sydney E. Junkins Ltd, a contracting firm in Vancouver, where he assisted in the construction of a reinforced concrete wharf for the Canadian Pacific Railway. Whilst working there Wynne-Edwards trained as a diver so that he could undertake underwater inspections of work.

In 1924 he married Hope Elizabeth Day Fletcher the daughter of Francis Fletcher, a surveyor from Nelson, British Columbia. They had one son and three daughters. He became a member of the American Society of Civil Engineers whilst in Canada and an associate member of the Institution of Civil Engineers (ICE) in 1926. In 1928 he submitted a paper on the wharf at Vancouver to the ICE and was awarded a Telford Medal. From 1929 he maintained his position at Junkins whilst working with the Northern Construction Company on the shield-driven sections of the Detroit–Windsor Tunnel and a water tunnel in Vancouver.

== Return to UK ==
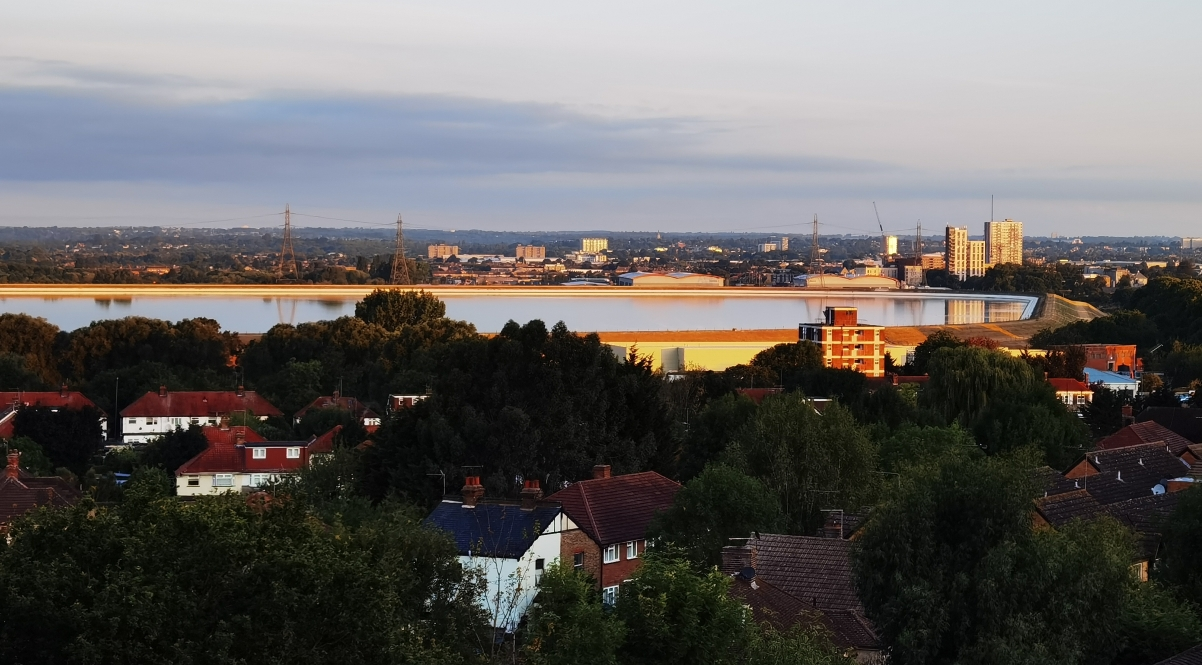
The William Girling Reservoir

Following a downturn in building during a 1934 economic slump in Canada Wynne-Edwards returned to the UK in 1935 where he joined John Mowlem & Co. He was given the task of building the William Girling Reservoir near Chingford in Essex, this was constructed using the first fleet of newly developed American earth moving equipment to reach Britain. In 1937 a recently constructed part of the dam embankment collapsed and it was shown by the Building Research Station (BRS) that the fault was due to a patch of soft clay which Wynne-Edwards had asked to be allowed to remove but was overruled. When this theory was ignored by more senior consultants Wynne-Edwards traced Karl von Terzaghi, the famous geologist and soil mechanics expert, and persuaded him to represent Mowlem. Terzaghi supported the BRS's theory and redesigned the bank to accommodate his findings. The publicity surrounding this event and Wynne-Edwards lectures at universities led to the popularisation and acceptance of the relatively new science of soil-mechanics in the UK.

== Second World War ==
After the outbreak of the Second World War Wynne-Edwards worked as a deputy agent for Mowlem in the construction of a shell factory in Swynnerton, Staffordshire. This so impressed the Ministry of Works that he was seconded to it as the director of plant for the remainder of the war. In this role he excelled as a chairman, especially during several difficult Anglo-American committees. In recognition of this fact he was appointed as an officer of the Order of the British Empire on 2 June 1943.

== Post-War ==
Following the war's end in 1945 Wynne-Edwards joined Richard Costain Ltd as a director and became managing director in 1948. Here he concentrated on the oil and chemical industries, in particular pipelaying. This included the laying of a pipeline for the Anglo-Iranian Oil Company from their Abadan Refinery to Tehran at the rate of three miles per day. In 1957 he was elected a first class member of the Smeatonian Society of Civil Engineers Wynne-Edwards served chairman of both the Building Research Board and the Road Research Board from 1960 to 1965, a role for which he was rewarded with his appointment as a Commander of the Order of the British Empire on 1 January 1962. In 1965 he served as a member of the advisory committee to Harold Wilson for the Queen's Award to Industry.

== Institutions and honours ==
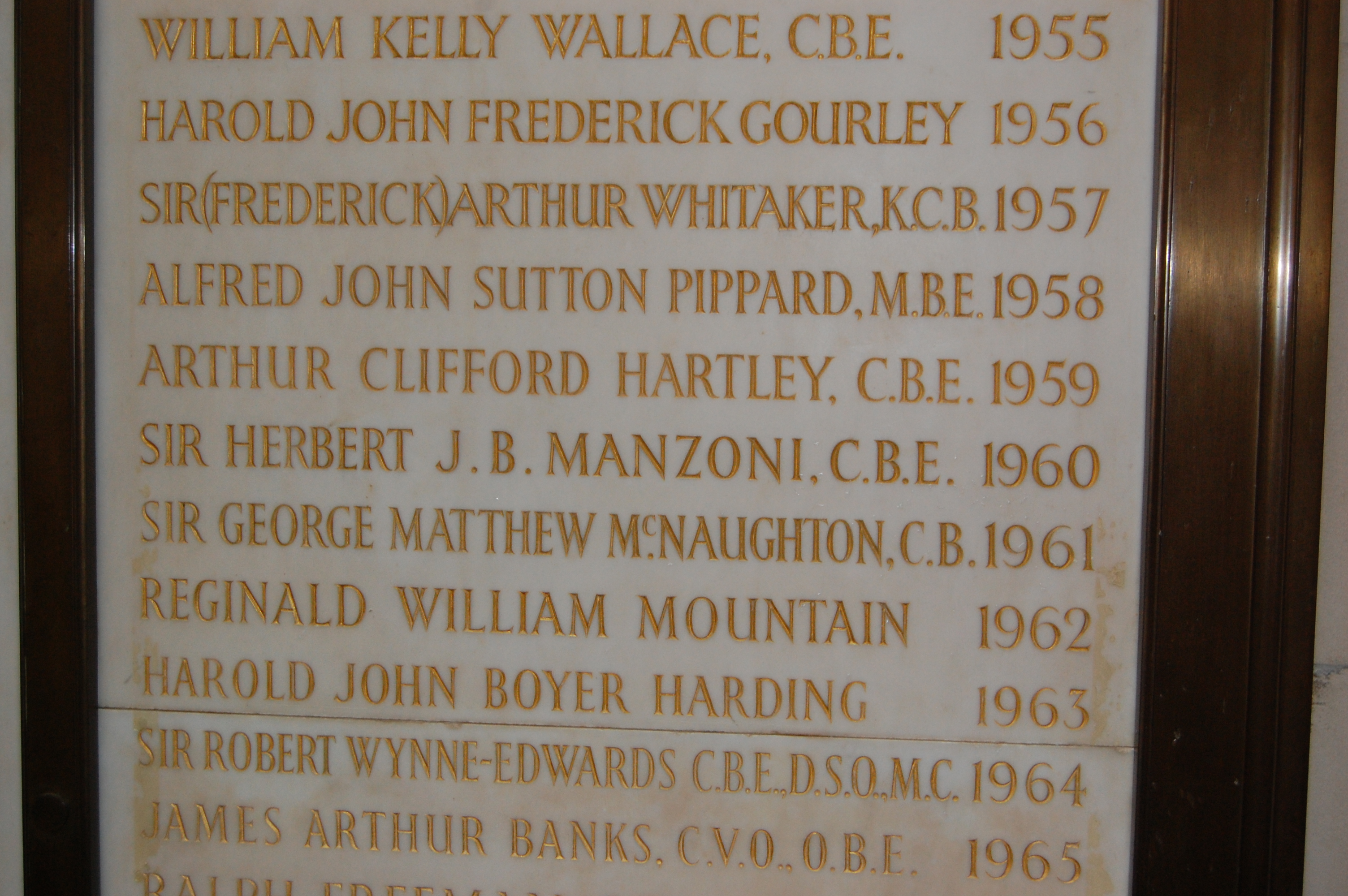
Wynne-Edwards's name on the list of Institution of Civil Engineers presidents, at their One Great George Street headquarters

Wynne-Edwards was a keen supporter of the Institution of Civil Engineers and served on many of its committees and being elected to its governing council in 1950. He was elected as president of the Institution in 1964, the 100th president and the first to be elected whilst still working as a contractor. He became the founder-chairman of the Council of Engineering Institutions for 1964–6 a role he was rewarded for with a knighthood in the Queen's Birthday Honours on 12 June 1965. Wynne-Edwards was also an honorary member of both the Institution of Structural Engineers and the American Society of Civil Engineers and was made an honorary fellow of the University of Manchester Institute of Science and Technology in 1965. He received an honorary Doctor of Science degree from Salford University in 1966 and was elected president of the Manchester Technology Association for 1969.

== Personal life ==
Wynne-Edwards found time to hold an interest in natural history, bee-keeping, gardening and reading. He also kept horses which he occasionally used for fox-hunting with the Old Surrey and Burstow hunt. He retired to Blandford Forum, Dorset and died at the Promenade Hospital in Southport, Lancashire on 22 June 1974.

Professional and academic associations
Preceded by Harold Harding	President of the Institution of Civil Engineers; November 1964 – November 1965	Succeeded by James Arthur Banks
