= Ponders End =

Area in Enfield, north London, England

Coordinates: 51.646°N 0.046°W

- Ponders End High Street

- Location within Greater London
- Population: 15,664 (2011 Census)
- OS grid reference: TQ 353 959
- London borough: Enfield
- Ceremonial county: Greater London
- Region: London
- Country: England
- Sovereign state: United Kingdom
- Post town: ENFIELD
- Postcode district: EN1, EN3
- Dialling code: 020
- Police: Metropolitan
- Fire: London
- Ambulance: London
- UK Parliament: Enfield North
- London Assembly: Enfield and Haringey

Ponders End is the southeasternmost part of Enfield, north London, England, around Hertford Road west of the River Lee Navigation. It became industrialised through the 19th century, similarly to the Lea Valley in neighbouring Edmonton and Brimsdown, with manufacturing giving way to warehousing in the late 20th century. The area features much social housing, with streets also lined with suburban terraced housing from the 19th and early 20th centuries.

As a result of immigration, the area has become the most ethnically diverse part of Enfield: the majority of the population had an ethnic minority background at the 2011 census. As of 2021 the area was undergoing large-scale regeneration, and the high-rise Alma Road Estate was being demolished and redeveloped, and the new Electric Quarter development was being completed. Ponders End had a population of 14,101 as of 2024.

== Etymology ==
Ponders End is marked on the Ordnance Survey map of 1822. It was recorded in 1593 as Ponders ende meaning the "end or quarter of the parish associated with the Ponder family" from the Middle English ende. John Ponder is mentioned in a document of 1373; the surname is believed to mean a "keeper of, or dweller by, a fish-pond or mill-pond".

== History ==
Ponders End once was rural Middlesex, but in 1840 the Northern and Eastern Railway (now part of Greater Anglia National Rail) station opened, which slowly attracted development to the area.

All but a southern belt of the district was in Enfield, as the south lay in Edmonton. These parishes diverged into civil and ecclesiastical parishes at a split of functions in the 1860s, which saw the final secularisation of government, the disestablishment of the vestries following the increase in Poor Law Unions in the hundred years before.

Through the 19th century the area became industrialised, due to its straight road and waterway network up and down the Lea Valley, including the 17th century River Lee Navigation. The first major firm to arrive was Grout, Baylis & Co, who were established in Norwich in 1807 as crape manufacturers, the material being used for widows' weeds. They opened a dyeing and finishing plant in Ponders End two years later. Crape went out of fashion by late Victorian times, and the factory closed in 1894. The buildings were taken over by the United Flexible Tubing Company.

Two Brewers Memorial Garden was opened in 2014 on the site of the pub where 20 people were killed during the Blitz

In 1866 the London Jute Works Company established a factory on the Navigation in a desolate area known locally as Spike Island. Many of the new employees came from Dundee, the traditional centre of the jute industry in Scotland. The jute works closed in 1882, to be replaced by the Ediswan factory. Over the years the factory was enlarged, eventually covering 11.50 acres (4.65 ha), and employing many people, notably girls, from the area. Ediswan produced electric lamps, and the factory was colloquially known as The Lamp. They also manufactured appliances for the shipping and aviation industries, mechanical pianos and butter makers.

On 30th September 1940, during the Blitz, German Luftwaffe bombers were flying over the Lea Valley, possibly for a raid on the Royal Small Arms Factory at Enfield Lock. Instead, however, several bombs were dropped on Ponders End two miles to the south. One of these was a direct hit on the Two Brewers Pub at the corner of High Street and South Street. The detonation killed 20 people who were sheltering in the basement. The pub was never rebuilt and, 74 years later, a memorial garden was opened on the site where it once stood.

Ponders End Lock

To the south of Ponders End Lock a factory making white lead was built in 1893. Further south of that factory, the Cortecine works produced floor-cloth and carpet backing. By 1906 over 2000 people were employed in local factories. Another major industry in the late 19th century was horticulture. Tomatoes and cucumbers were the principal produce, but flowers and fruit were also grown in the many orchards and greenhouses to the north of the locality. During World War I, a huge munitions factory, the Ponders End Shell Works, was built in Wharf Road. The factory building was sold after the war. Further factories were built in the 1930s alongside the newly-built Great Cambridge Road.

As of 2009 little remains of manufacturing, and much of the area has given way to warehousing and residential developments. Aesica pharmaceutical manufacturers (formerly Thomas Morson Ltd) closed its plant in 2011. Wright's Flour Mill, the oldest working industrial building in the borough remains, some of its buildings having been constructed in the 18th century.

The new Ponders End Library building opened in 2022 as part of the new 'Electric Quarter' development

On 7 August 2011 Ponders End was the scene of copy-cat riots which spread from Tottenham to neighbouring districts.

In spring 2017, Camden Town Brewery completed a new facility in Ponders End on the western bank of the Lee Navigation.

In August 2020, Beavertown Brewery opened "Beaverworld", a new brewery on a six-acre plot on the western bank of the Lee Navigation, creating up to 150 jobs.

In 2021 the new Electric Quarter development, comprising 167 homes, was completed. The homes were built on the site of the former police station which closed in 2011. A new library and medical centre were also opened in new buildings facing Ponders End High Street.

== Historic buildings ==
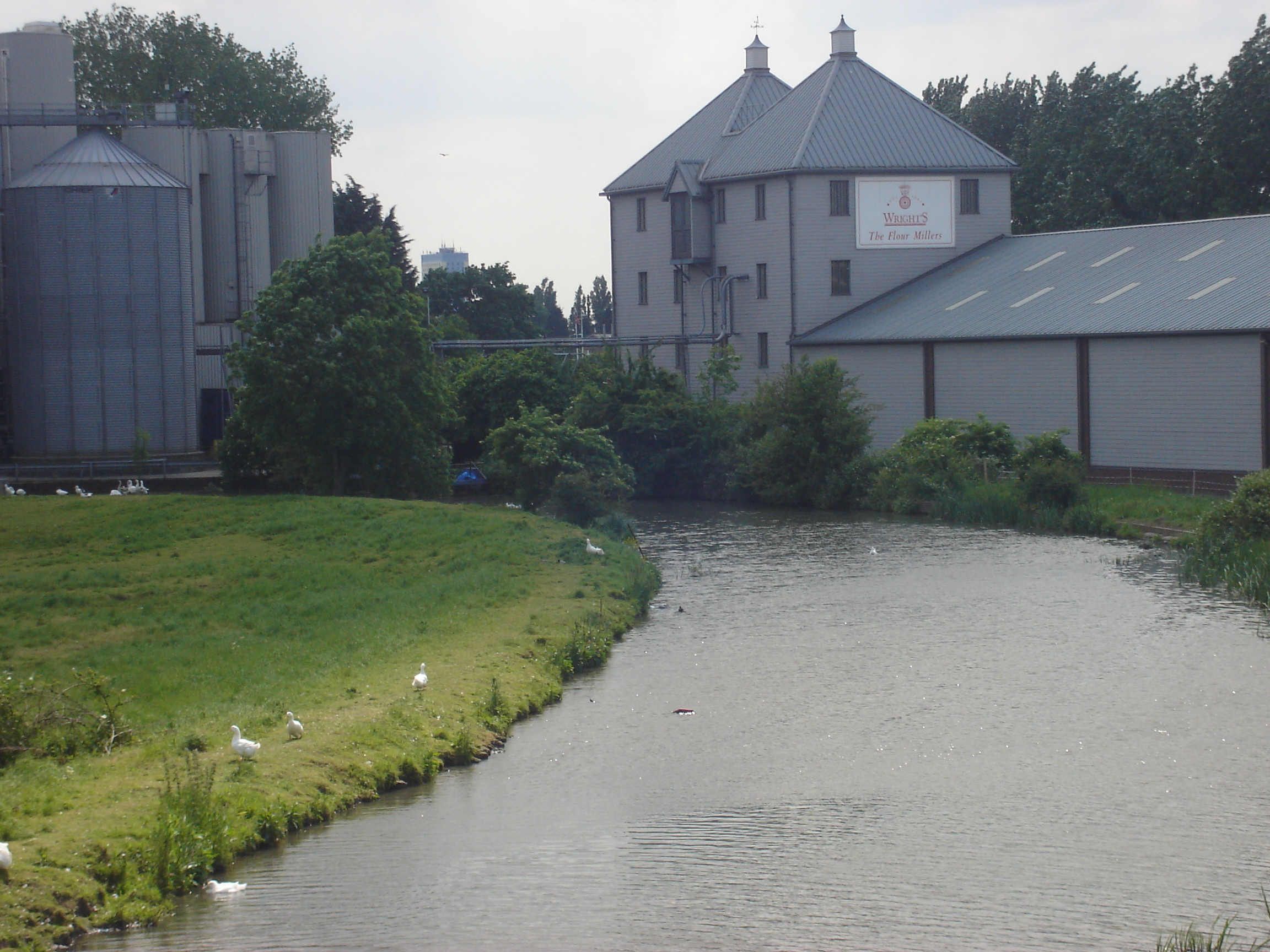
Wright's Flour Mill and the mill stream

- Wright's Flour Mill: The oldest working industrial building in Enfield. Milling is said to have taken place on the same part of the river at Ponders End for around 1,000 years.
- Ponders End Pumping Station: Built in 1899 by the East London Waterworks Company. In 1995 the half-timbered building was converted into a public house called the Harvester Navigation Inn, a Harvester restaurant. Located on the west bank of the Lee Navigation, with views towards the grassed embankment of the King George V Reservoir and close to Ponders End Lock.

== Geography ==
Elevations range from 21 metres (69 ft) to 13 metres (43 ft) above sea level, uniformly dropping from west to east. Two north-south railway lines enclose the residential parts of the area, bounded east and west by estates of warehousing, industrial and commercial use

Its northern and southern limits are along Hertford Road at The Ride and The Boundary pubs (north to south). Its loosely defined east and west limits coalesce around Wharf Road in the east and the Southbury station or Kingsway in the west.

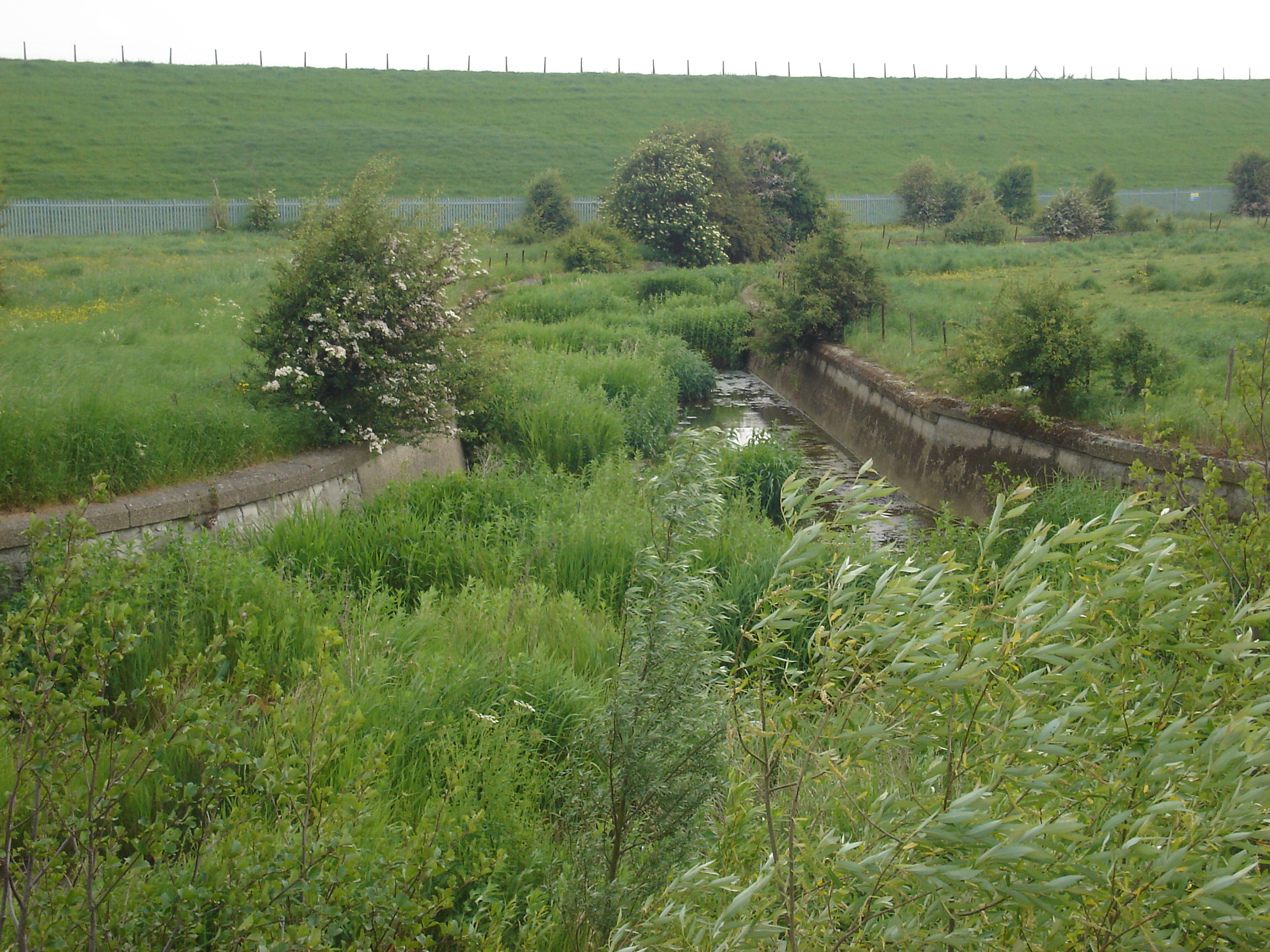
South Marsh, Overflow Channel and the grassed embankment of the King George V Reservoir

=== Nearest places ===
- Brimsdown
- Enfield Highway
- Edmonton, London
- Enfield Town
- Bush Hill Park
- Chingford

=== Watercourses ===
- River Lee Navigation
- The Overflow Channel is approximately 2 miles (3.2 km) long. Flowing from the River Lee Navigation above Ponders End Lock across South Marsh close to the King George V Reservoir and following the western perimeter of the William Girling Reservoir to merge with the River Lee Diversion at Edmonton.

== Sport ==
- Angling is allowed on the River Lee Navigation upstream and downstream of Ponders End Lock. Information from the River Lea Anglers Club.

== Transport ==
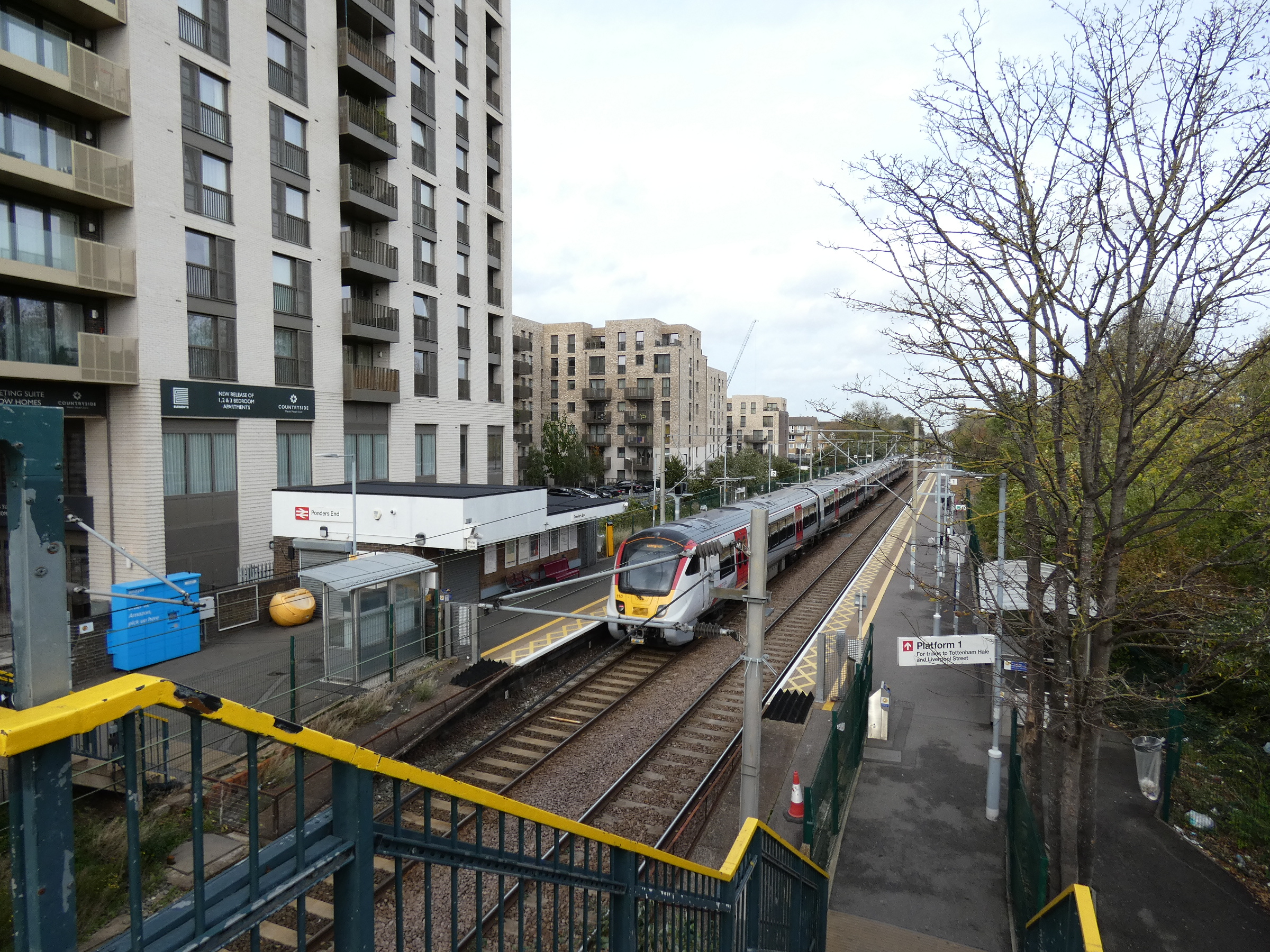
Ponders End Station offers trains into central London

- Ponders End railway station
- Southbury railway station

London Buses routes 121, 191, 259, 279, 307, 313, 377, 491 and N279 serve the area.

=== Local rail services ===
- London Overground's Weaver Line services from Southbury, north to Cheshunt and south to Liverpool Street
- West Anglia Main Line stopping services from Ponders End, north to Hertford East and Bishop's Stortford, south to Liverpool Street and Stratford

== Demography ==
The 2021 census showed that 40.7% of the Ponders End ward population was white (31.3% British, 7.5% other, 1.9% Irish), 18.5% black (10.8% African, 5.1% Caribbean, 1.8% British, 0.8 other) and 7.6% Turkish or Turkish Cypriot.

== Notable people ==
- James and John Chambers, pioneers in South Australia in Stuart expeditions.
- John Hollowbread, footballer
- Christopher Hughes, former Mastermind and International Mastermind winner, both in 1983
- Stephen Mangan, actor
- Dave Peacock, musician
- Norman Tebbit, politician
- Chijindu Ujah, Olympic sprinter
- Louie Spence, Dancer, Choreographer and television presenter

== Local newspapers ==
The local newspapers are, as of 2026:

- Enfield Dispatch
- Enfield Independent

== Politics ==
Ponders End is part of the Enfield North parliamentary constituency, represented by Feryal Clark (Labour). At Enfield's last local election in 2026, the Ponders End ward elected one Labour councillor and one Green councillor in a narrowly-contest vote. Prior to 2022 it was a three-member ward which had elected Labour councillors by wide margins going back to 2002.

== Education ==
=== Schools ===
- Secondary schools: Oasis Academy Hadley and Heron Hall Academy
- Primary schools: Kingfisher Hall Primary Academy, St Mary's RC Primary School, Alma Primary School, Southbury Primary School, St Matthew's CoE Primary School, Oasis Academy Hadley
- Special schools: Waverley School

=== Higher education ===
- The College of Haringey, Enfield and North East London

== Places of worship ==
- Church of St Matthew, Church of England
- Church of Mary, Mother of God, Roman Catholic church
- Jalalia Jamme Mosque
- At the 28th Enfield Scouts Group, on Friday, there is exclusively Jumu'ah congregation, Alma Road
- Lincoln Road Chapel, Lincoln Road.
- Ponders End Methodist Church, High Street.
- United Reformed Church, College Close, High Street.

Ponders End Park

== Open spaces ==
- Ponders End Park, formerly Ponders End Recreation Ground and Ryan's Park.

== In popular culture ==
Critchley & Simmons released an album titled Ponders End in 2017, inspired by the area where they first met.

Musician Jah Wobble was inspired to write his (2005) album Mu by his experiences in the Lea Valley and Ponders End.

It's as close as London gets to New Jersey. But it's one of my favourite places for walking, through the Lee Valley. It gets beautiful in that urban way, but then you go through soap factories up near Ponders End. It's got a wonderful, dislocated, alienated feeling

— Jah Wobble

"Ponders End Allotments Club" is a track from the (1975) Chas and Dave album One Fing 'n' Annuver.

In "The Fall and Rise of Reggie Perrin", Uncle Percy Spillinger informs us that his six previous wives have all died and been buried at Ponders End.
