= Wright's Flour Mill =

Industrial building in Enfield, London

Coordinates: 51.642491°N 0.032895°W

Wright's Flour Mill is located in Wharf Road, Ponders End, Enfield. It is Enfield's oldest working industrial building.

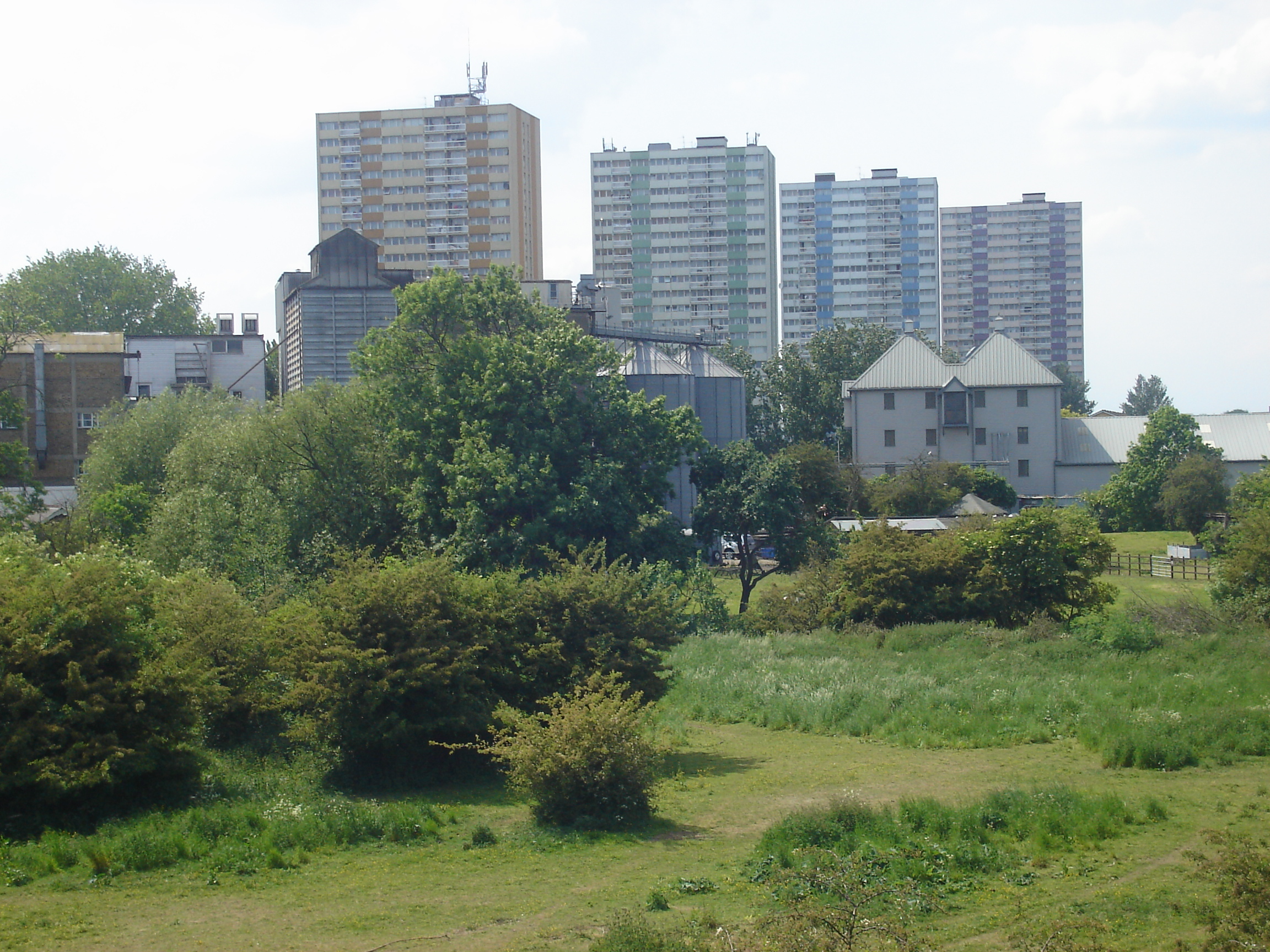
The mill and the water-meadows viewed from the A121 road bridge

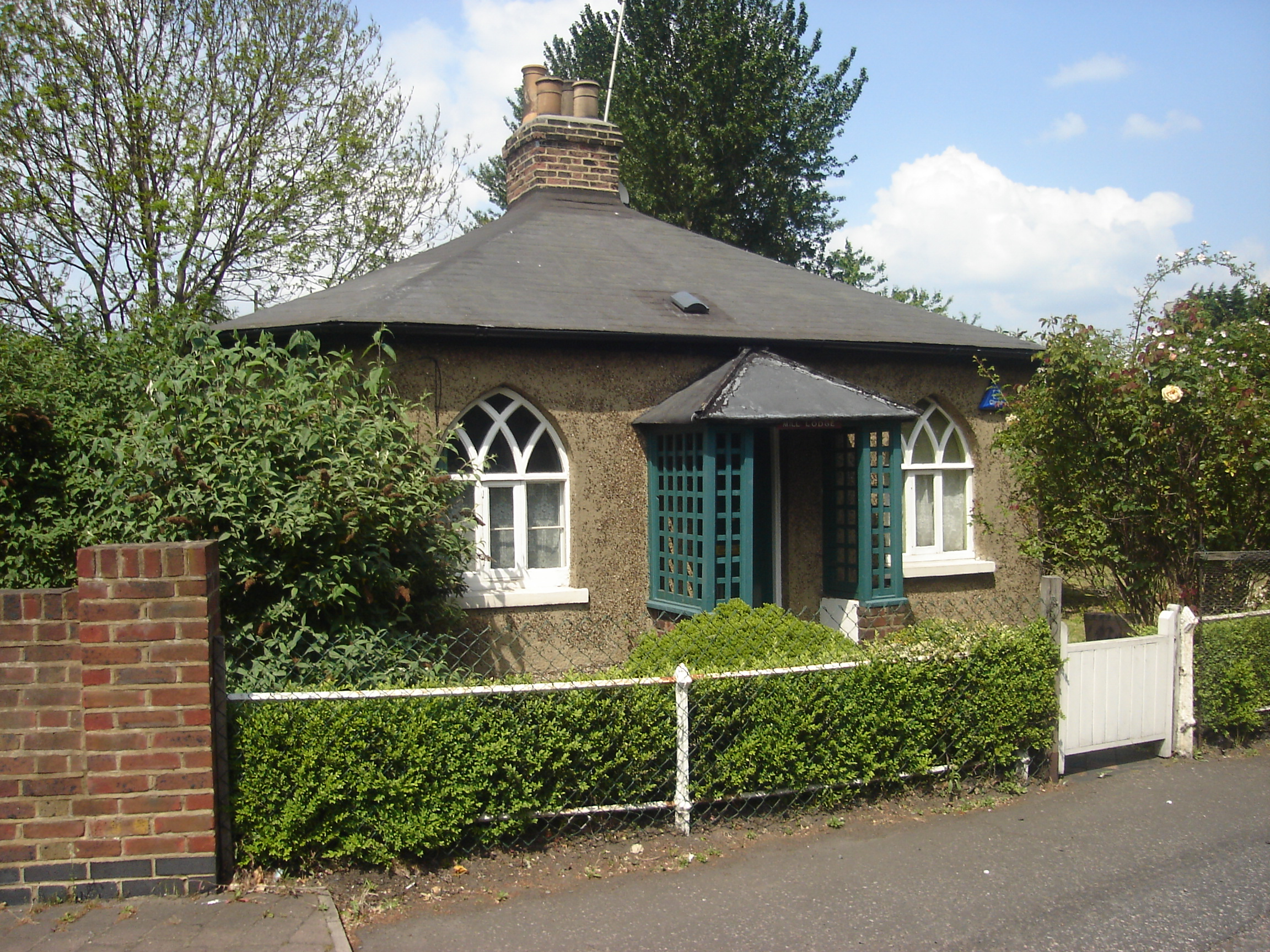
Early 19th century lodge at entrance to mill

== History ==
Some of the present buildings date back to 1789 and include the brick Georgian miller's house and offices flanking a 3½-storey watermill of brick and white weatherboarding. There has been a mill here since at least the late 16th century and possibly Domesday. George Reynolds Wright took full control of the mill in 1870. The mill was originally powered by a backwater of the River Lea, but in 1913, owing to construction work at the nearby King George V Reservoir, the water supply powering the millstones was cut off. The machinery was then converted to electricity.

== Today ==
The business is still owned by the Wright family; making it London's only family owned flour mill. The company mills flour for several family-owned bakeries in the locality.
