= Heron Hall Academy =

School in Ponders End, London, England

Location
- Queensway, Ponders End, Enfield, Middlesex, EN3 4SA; 51.646365°N 0.05097°W

Information
- Established: September 2, 2013
- Department for Education URN: 139599 Tables
- Ofsted: Reports
- Head teacher: Mr David Maytham
- Age range: 11-19
- Website: www.heronhallacademy.org.uk

Heron Hall Academy is a secondary free school in Ponders End, Enfield, London. It was founded as part of the Cuckoo Hall Academy Trust (CHAT), which also ran local primary schools Cuckoo Hall, Woodpecker Hall, Kingfisher Hall and Enfield Heights Academy. All of these schools are now part of the North Star Community Trust.

== History ==
The academy was opened in 2013 with three classes in year 7. At the time, the school was based on Nightingale Road, near Cuckoo Hall. By September 2015, the school was eight-form entry, having moved to the former Middlesex University site in Ponders End. The new site was reported to cost £40 million.

In February 2015, CHAT was investigated by the Department for Education following allegations of bullying, financial misconduct and safeguarding failures surrounding staff being hired without proper DBS checks. Heron Hall is now part of the North Star Community Trust.

In May 2016, Heron Hall announced a plan to lease four of their spare classrooms to the One Degree academy.

A sixth form opened in September 2023.

== Ofsted ==
Heron Hall has had two full inspections and one short inspection. In June 2015 the school was found to be Good in all areas, although inspectors criticised middle leaders' use of data and had concerns that not all students were being challenged in the classroom. In October 2024, Ofsted found that the academy "has taken effective action to maintain the standards identified at the previous inspection", but criticised the consistency of behaviour management in the corridors and found that the curricula in some subjects were "at an earlier stage of design".
