= William Girling Reservoir =

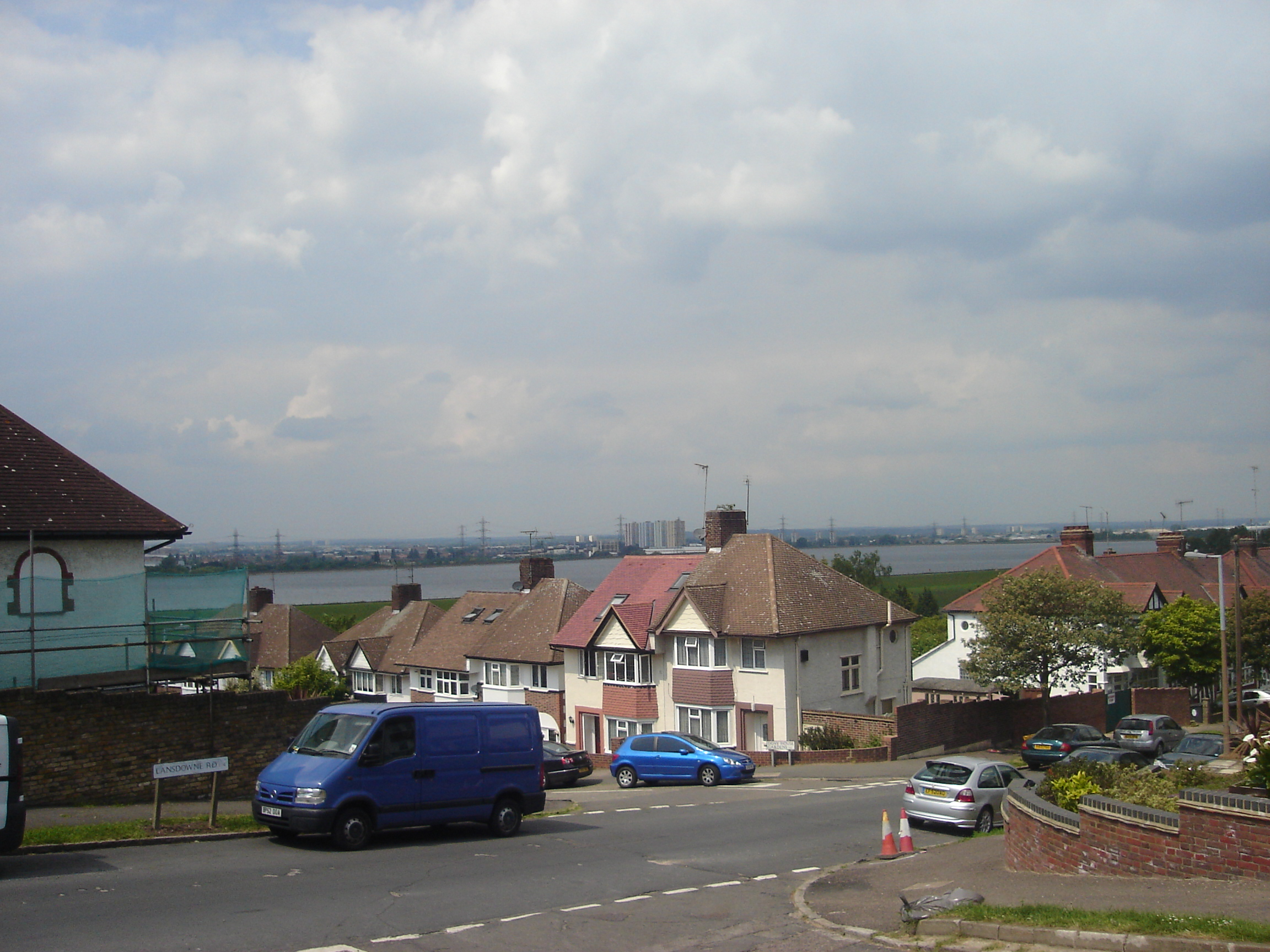
- The reservoir viewed from Chingford

- Location within London Borough of Enfield
- Location: London Borough of Enfield
- Coordinates: 51.6316°N 0.0244°W
- Type: reservoir
- Primary inflows: River Lee Diversion
- Basin countries: United Kingdom
- Surface area: 135 ha (330 acres)
- Max. depth: 12.5 m (41 ft)
- Water volume: 16.5 Gl (3.6×10^{9} imp gal)

The William Girling Reservoir is located in the London Borough of Enfield and is part of the Lee Valley Reservoir Chain that supplies London with drinking water. It is named after William Girling OBE, a chairman of the Metropolitan Water Board (MWB). The reservoir and the nearby King George V Reservoir are known collectively as the Chingford Reservoirs. The storage reservoir, which is owned by Thames Water, is bordered by Chingford to the east and Ponders End and Edmonton to the west, and covers 334 acres (135 hectares) with a perimeter of 3.5 miles (5.6 km). There is no public access.

== History ==
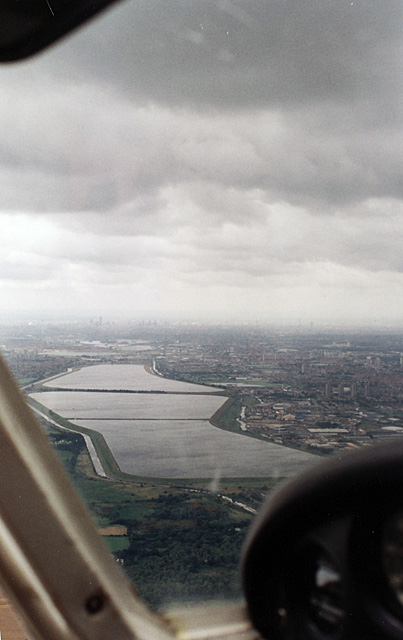
The Chingford Reservoirs: Looking south over the twin basins of the King George V Reservoir and the William Girling Reservoir in background

The reservoir was conceived as part of an overall plan for the Lea Valley and laid before the Royal Commission on Water Supply (Balfour Committee) in 1893. At the time the responsible authority was the East London Waterworks Company. However, under the provisions of the Metropolis Water Act 1902, the undertakings of this and seven other companies were transferred to the Metropolitan Water Board (MWB).

Work began in 1936 when the tender of John Mowlem (for £682,156) was accepted. The project was led by civil engineer, Robert Wynne-Edwards. Due to the use of mechanical scrapers and bulldozers, which were being used for the first time in British dam construction, progress was rapid. The design, by Sir Jonathan Roberts Davidson, President of the Institution of Civil Engineers 1948/49, attracted widespread technical interest in 1937 when a major slip occurred in the partly formed embankment at the north-west corner. When the embankment fill had reached 23 feet (7.0 m) a 66-foot (20 m) width had dropped 2 feet 4 inches (71 cm) and moved forward 13 feet (4.0 m). Fortunately, the dam failed before any water had been stored. Investigations were under way when a second slip occurred in December 1937. Two independent soil mechanics experts, Herbert Chatley and Karl Terzaghi, were called in and both made recommendations. In July 1938 the MWB made important modifications to the original design. Subsequent investigations into this landslip can be regarded as the birth of modern soil mechanics in Britain. The reservoir was redesigned to increase its capacity by 11.3%.

Construction was further delayed by the outbreak of the Second World War and the reservoir was not finally completed until 1951, when it was officially opened on 4 September by William Girling, Chairman of the MWB, and named eponymously.

As part of the 2012 Summer Olympics security exercise, the reservoir was identified as suitable for the deployment of Rapier surface-to-air missiles.

== Description ==
The geology of the site is alluvium underlain by river terrace gravels and in turn overlying the London Clay formation.

The reservoir is formed by a continuous earthen embankment that encloses the basin. The embankments consist of a central puddle clay core with a selected material adjacent to the core forming a filter. The core is a maximum of 12 feet (3.7 m) wide at the base and tapers to 5 feet (1.5 m) wide at the crest. The core typically extends 3 feet (91 cm) into the London Clay to form a watertight cut off.

The embankment shoulders consist of zones of ballast and filling material. The upper embankments slopes are 1 in 2.5 externally, whilst the lower slopes to the berm were constructed at a bank slope of 1 in 8.

It was considered necessary to reinforce the NW corner (Ponders End) with sheet-piling which was driven, suspended from a Weldex crane (see photo) ending in 2020

== Inflow ==
Water is pumped from the River Lee Diversion through five inlet pumps with a maximum of 600 ML/d, though normal operation is 250 ML/d.

In addition there are two 200 mm diameter inlets from the North London Artificial Recharge borehole scheme.

== Outflow ==
The outlet tower consists of a granite faced dry shaft that houses a 54 inches (140 cm) diameter vertical pipe, with draw-off pipes at four different levels. The lower end of the standpipe is connected to a 50 inches (130 cm) diameter steel outlet conduit.

The water is conveyed to the Coppermills Water Treatment Works for treatment, with the facility for bulk transfer to Essex and Suffolk Water.

== Ecology ==
The water is part of the Chingford Reservoirs Site of Special Scientific Interest (SSSI). It is a major wintering ground for wildfowl and wetland birds, including nationally important numbers of some species. The water also forms a moult refuge for a large population of wildfowl during the late summer months. A total of 85 wetland species have been recorded here in recent years.

== Gallery ==
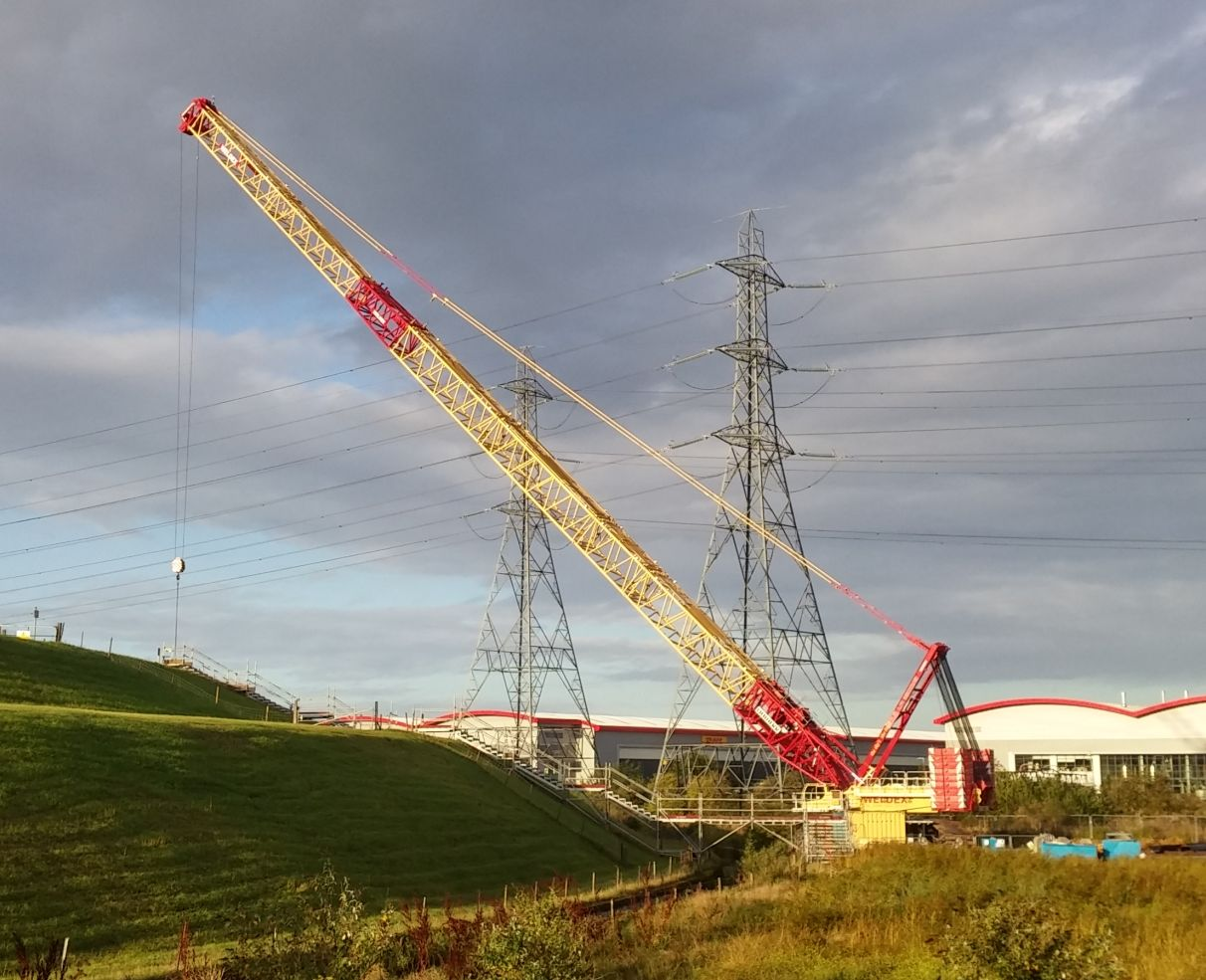
Weldex crane below embankment.

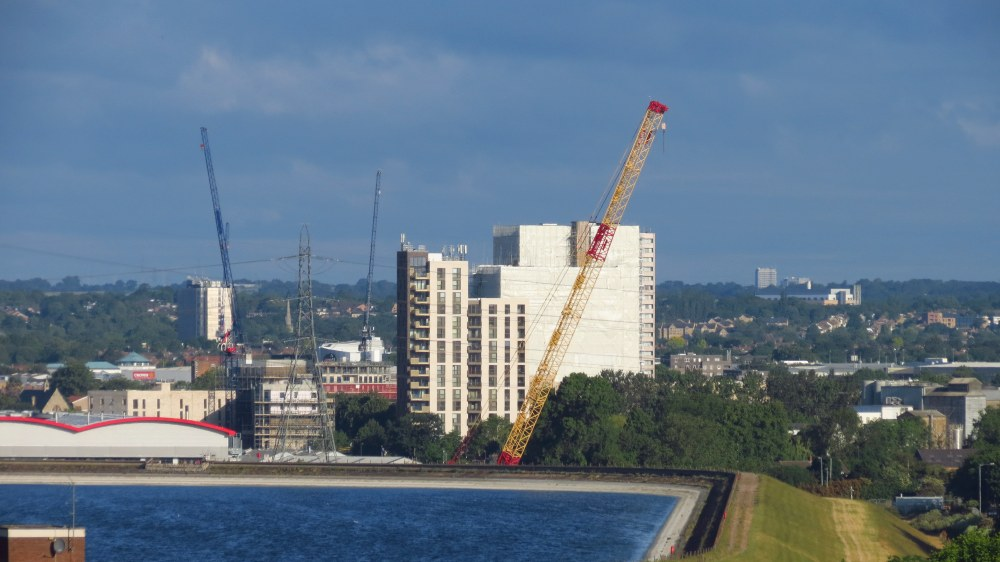
Weldex carrying out sheet piling work NW corner of reservoir.

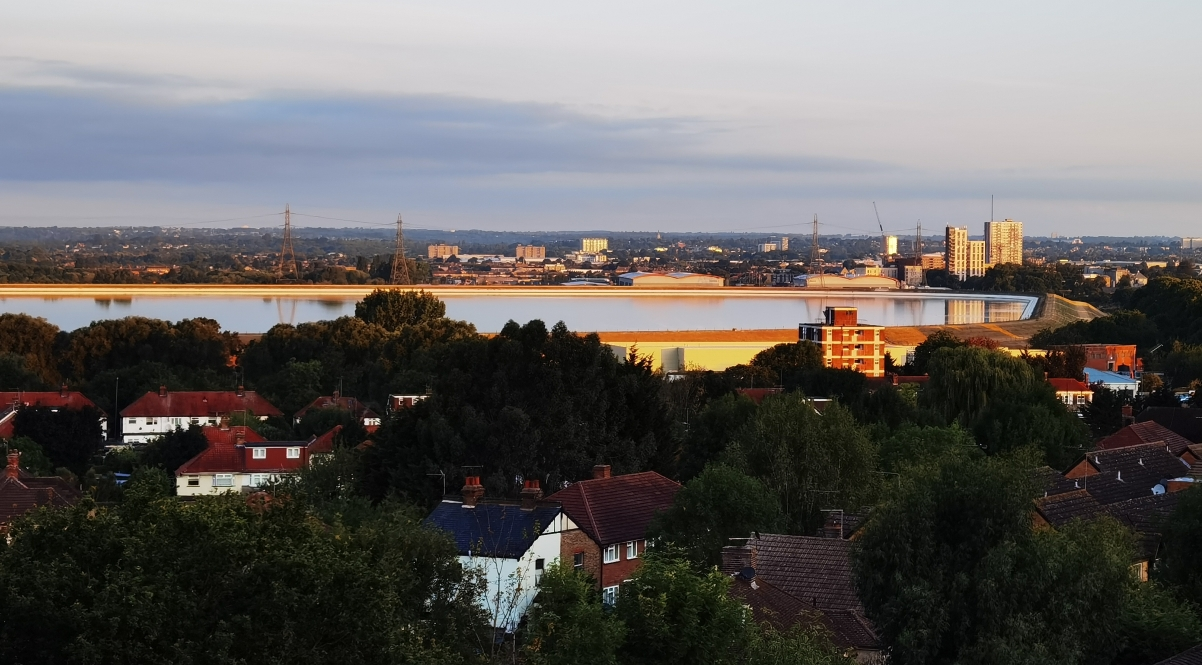
View west towards Ponders End

== See also ==
- London water supply infrastructure
- List of Sites of Special Scientific Interest in Greater London
