= River Lee Diversion =

River near London, England

Coordinates: 51.6501°N 0.0116°W

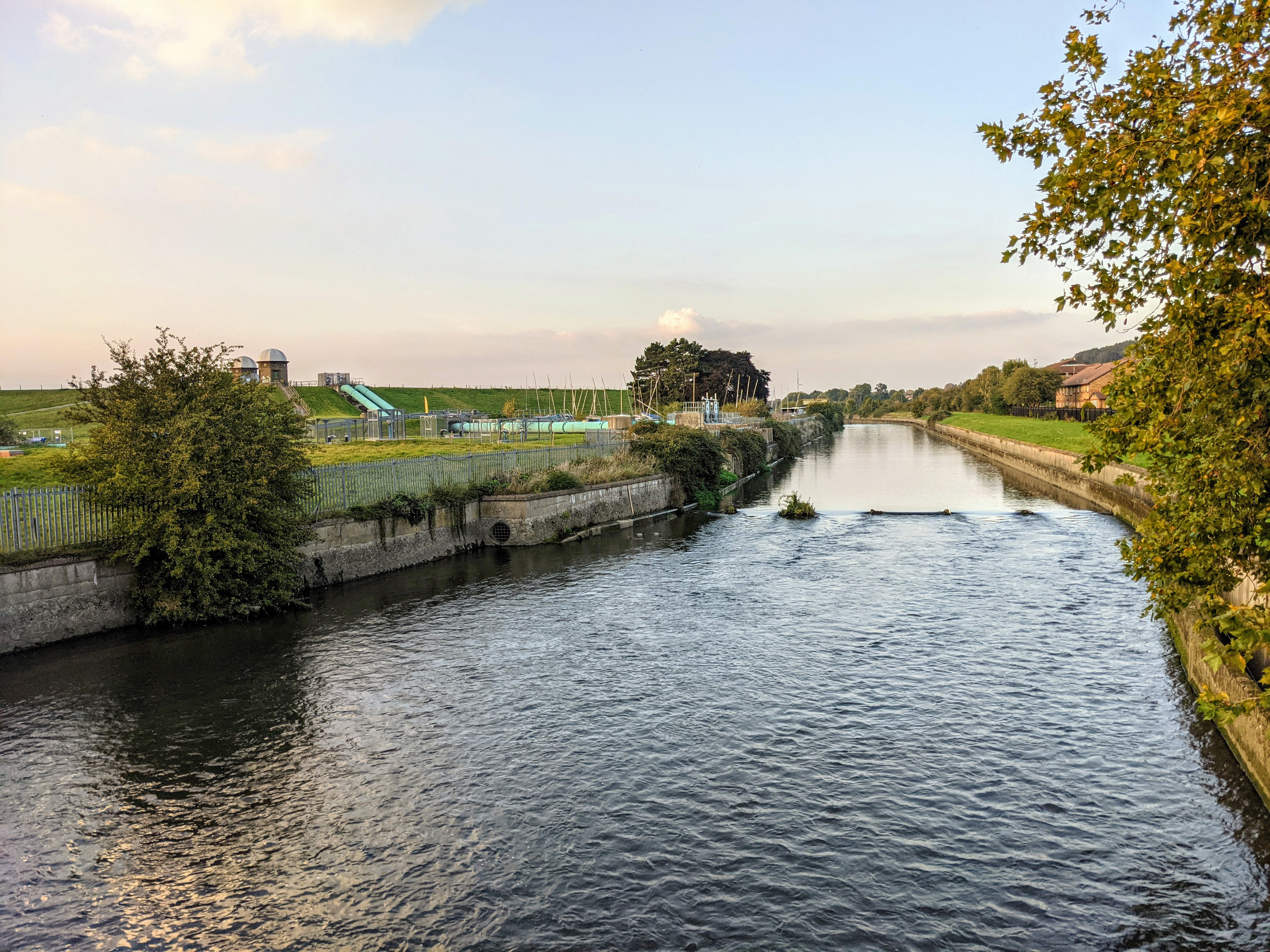
The river viewed from the A110 Lea Valley Road in Chingford

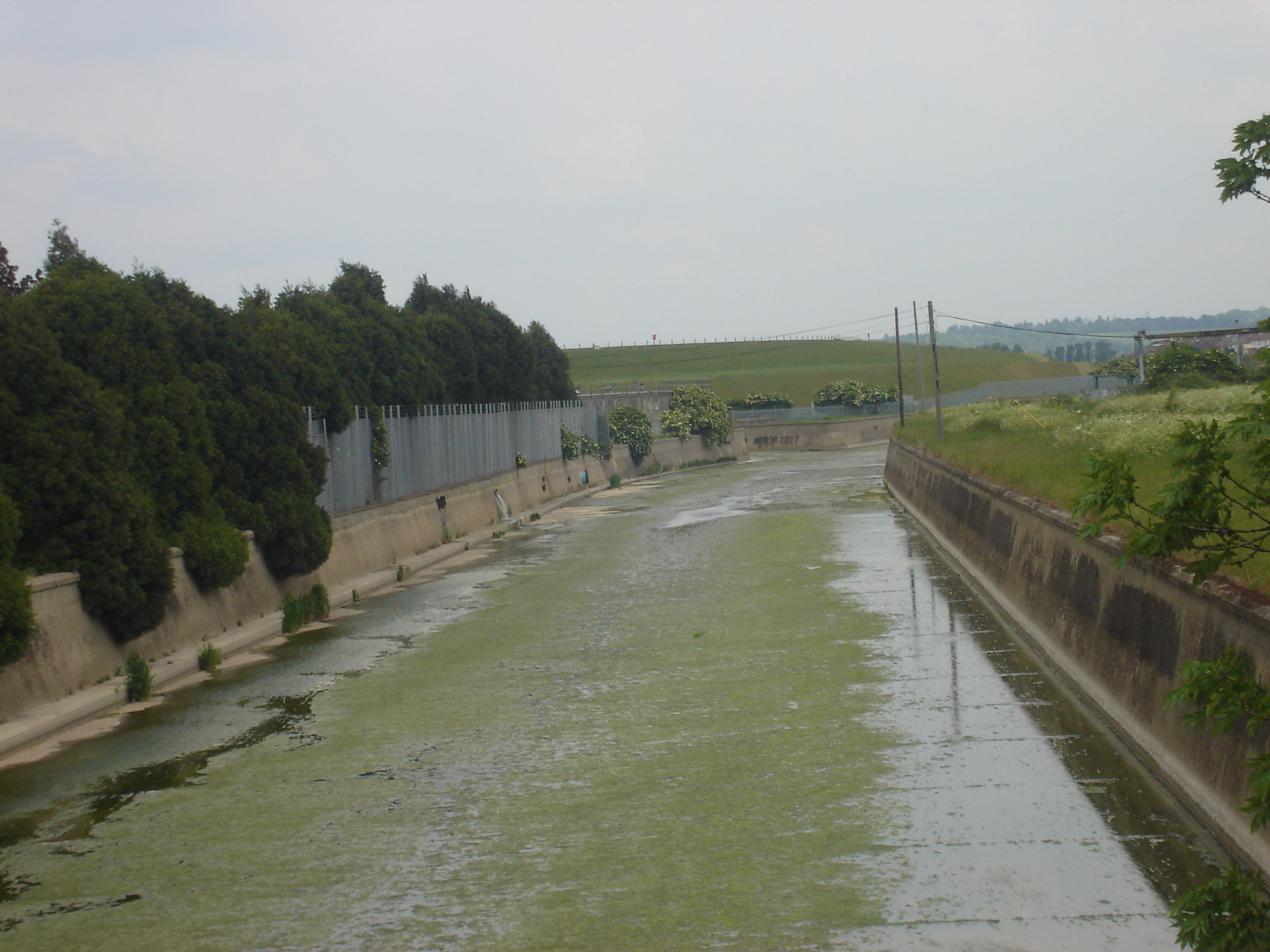
The river at Edmonton downstream of the confluence with the Overflow Channel. The grassed embankment of the William Girling Reservoir can be seen in the background

The River Lee Diversion is located in the Lea Valley, close to Enfield Lock and to the north east corner of the King George V Reservoir.

== History ==
As its name implies, the River Lea was diverted to accommodate the construction of the Chingford Reservoirs and the Banbury Reservoir.

== Course ==
Before skirting the eastern boundary of the King George V Reservoir, the river is joined by the River Lee Flood Relief Channel. The man-made, steep, concrete-banked water flows under Lea Valley Road (A110 road), before forming a boundary with the William Girling Reservoir. It flows under the North Circular Road at the Lea Valley Viaduct before skirting the western perimeter of the Banbury Reservoir, then flows close and parallel to the River Lee Navigation, passing to the west of the Lockwood Reservoir. It continues past Stonebridge Lock and Tottenham Lock, then merges with the River Lee Navigation below Ferry Lane (A503 road).

== Water supply ==
The river feeds water to some of the reservoirs in the Lee Valley Reservoir Chain.

== Ecology ==
The clean, well-oxygenated, concrete-lined, fast-flowing water provides the ideal environment for the barbel. Also, of note is the fish-eating bird the goosander which feeds in the river.

== Access ==
Access is limited as the river mainly flows through Thames Water property.
