= Brimsdown Power Station =

Former coal-fired power station in England

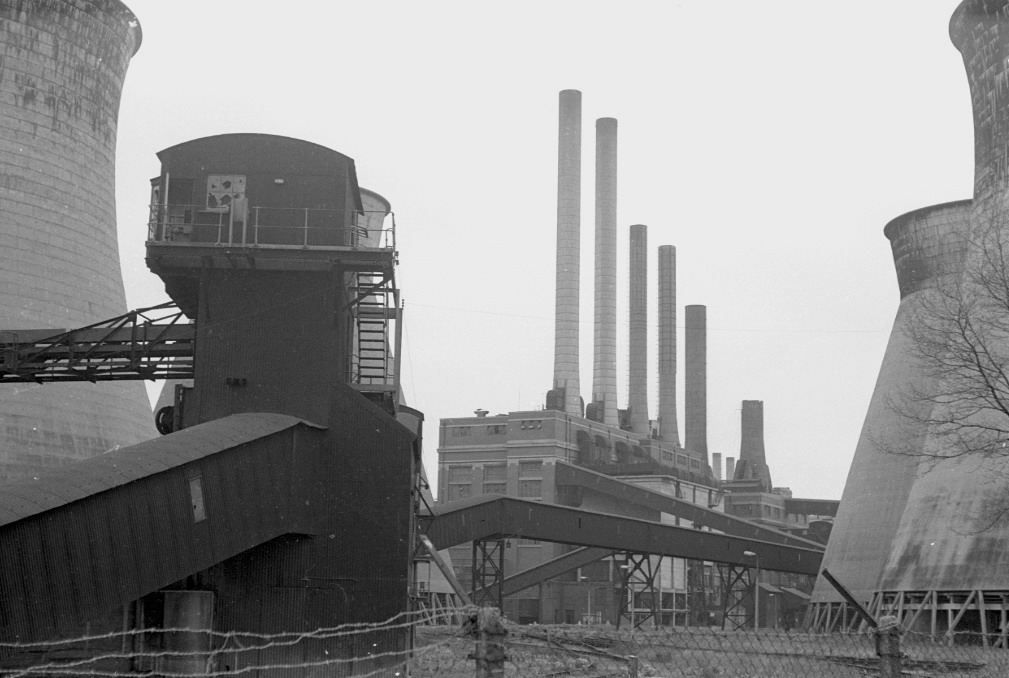
- Brimsdown Power Station 1974, showing part of the coal handling plant and 4 of the 7 cooling towers
- Country: England
- Location: Enfield, Middlesex
- Coordinates: 51.661°N 0.022°W
- Status: Decommissioned and demolished
- Construction began: 1904
- Commission date: 1907, 1926, 1955
- Decommission date: 1976
- Operators: North Metropolitan Electric Power Supply Company (1904–1948); British Electricity Authority (1948–1955); Central Electricity Authority (1955–1957); Central Electricity Generating Board (1958–1978)

Thermal power station
- Primary fuel: Coal
- Cooling towers: 7
- Cooling source: Recirculated water

Power generation
- Units operational: A: 1 × 54.8 MW, B: 1 × 60.27 MW and 1 × 60 MW
- Units decommissioned: All
- Nameplate capacity: 282.5 MW (1963)
- Annual net output: (See graphs below)

External links
- Commons: Related media on Commons

Brimsdown Power Station was a coal-fired power station on the Lee Navigation at Brimsdown in Middlesex. The station had seven cooling towers which were visible from a wide area.

== History ==
The first station was brought into operation by the North Metropolitan Electric Power Supply Company between 1904 and 1907, before officially opening in 1907. It was used primarily to supply the local tramways. The station was extended between 1924 and 1955, supplying power to the wider area of Enfield and Essex.

At the end of 1925, the capacity of the plant at Brimsdown 23,600 kW.

In 1928 a new station was opened by the North Metropolitan Electric Power Supply Company. Its capacity was 50,000 kilowatts, but in due course it is intended to add two other similar sections and two additional boiler-houses, when the capacity will be increased to 150,000 kilowatts. Prior to the erection of this new power house, the company had two main stations, one at Willesden and the other at Brimsdown, Enfield, where the new station has been built.

Power Station was the only known British example of the Loeffler boiler system. It was a system that enjoyed a brief vogue in the 1930s, mainly in Europe. It overcame metallurgical and feedwater quality problems but rapid advances rendered it unnecessary quite quickly.

Coal was supplied by barge or by rail.

In 1948 Britain's electricity supply industry was nationalised under the Electricity Act 1947 and Brimsdown Power Station became part of the British Electricity Authority. The BEA was succeeded by the Central Electricity Authority in 1955 and the Central Electricity Generating Board in 1958. The CEGB decommissioned both stations in 1976.

=== Technical specification ===
In 1904, the station contained 6 x Babcock & Wilcox boilers driving feeding 3 x Parsons Turbines equipped with 11,000 volt, 50 Hz Brown Boveri 1,000 kW alternators.

The 1928 station contained 2 x Parson 25 MW turbo alternators generating at 33kV which was high for the time and first example in the UK. These were fed from 5 x 100,000 Ib/hr boilers. The station was extended in 1932 and two new 25,000 kW sets, similar to the original machines, have been installed, together with four new boilers, each rated at 200,000 lb. per hour. The four alternators, giving a total output of 100,000 kW, were built by C. A. Parsons and Co., Ltd. Two were wound for 11,000 volts and two for 33,000-34,500 volts.

In 1939, the A station was refurbished with the installation of two Metropolitan Vickers turbo alternators. One run from a high pressure turbine of 31,000 kW and one from a low pressure turbine, fed from the exhaust of the high pressure set, of 18,000 kW. These were supplied with steam from two 210,000 Ib. per hr. boilers of the Loeffler type 2.000 lb. per sq. in and 910 deg. F.

In 1959, the B station had four Parsons 25 MW turbo-alternators and one Metropolitan Vickers 56.9 MW twin set. By 1963-64 the B station had 1 × 60.27 MW and 1 × 60 MW generators. The steam capacity of the associated boilers was 2,305,000 lb/hr (290.4 kg/s). Steam conditions at the 60.27 MW turbine stop valve was 315 / 900 psi (21.7 / 62.1 bar) and 360 / 399 / 482 °C. Steam conditions at the 60 MW turbine stop valve was 1900 psi (131 bar) and 499 °C. In 1963-64 the overall thermal efficiency of the B station was 23.17 per cent. The overall thermal efficiency of the A station in 1963-64 was 20.16 per cent.

There were 5 film cooling towers with a capacity of 6.6 million gallons per hour, and two natural draft reinforced concrete cooling towers each with a capacity of 1.56 million gallons per hour. Water was abstracted from the River Lea.

Electricity output from Brimsdown A and B power stations during their final years of operation was as follows.

Brimsdown A annual electricity output GWh
Brimsdown B annual electricity output GWh

== Enfield Power Station ==
A 392MW gas-fired CCGT station was opened on a part of the original site in 1999, known as Enfield Power Station or Enfield Energy Centre rather than Brimsdown Power Station. This has been operated by E.ON since 2005. The station [now owned and operated by Uniper] underwent a major upgrade in 2020/21 to increase output to 450MW.

== SS Brimsdown ==
In 1951 the British Electricity Authority named a new "flat-iron" coastal collier SS Brimsdown after the station. However, at 1,837 gross register tonnage, 270.6 feet (82.5 m) length, 39.5 feet (12 m) beam and 16.6 feet (5.1 m) draught she was a large coaster, not intended for service on the Lee Navigation.
