= Chingford Reservoirs =

Reservoirs in Essex and Greater London, England

Coordinates: 51°38′20″N 0°01′19″W

- Site of Special Scientific Interest
- Map of Chingford Reservoirs
- Location of Chingford Reservoirs.
- Area of search: Greater London; Essex
- Grid reference: TQ371953
- Interest: Biological
- Area: 391.3 ha (967 acres)
- Notification date: 1986
- Location map: Magic Map

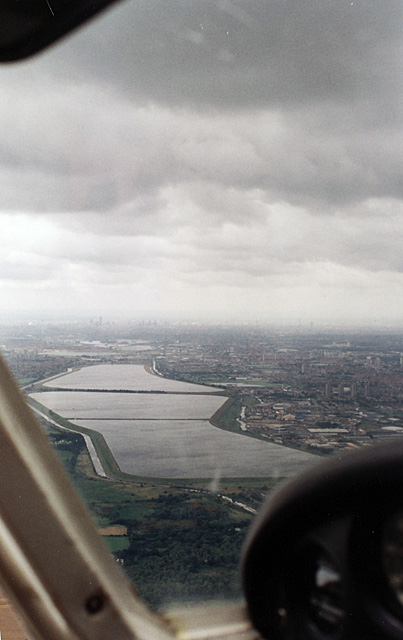
Looking south over the twin basins of the King George V Reservoir and the William Girling Reservoir in background

The Chingford Reservoirs are the King George V Reservoir and the William Girling Reservoir, which form part of the Lee Valley Reservoir Chain in the London Boroughs of Enfield and Waltham Forest and Epping Forest in Essex. Construction of the King George V Reservoir was started in 1908 and completed in 1912. Work on the William Girling Reservoir was started in 1938, with John Mowlem & Co being the contractor, but owing to technical problems, and the intervention of World War II, the reservoir was not finished until 1951. It was the technical problems at Chingford that led to the crucial start of real geotechnical investigations in the United Kingdom.

The reservoirs are a 391.3-hectare (967-acre) biological Site of Special Scientific Interest, of which 316.3 hectares are in London and 75 hectares in Essex. They are comparatively shallow and provide open water habitat for wildfowl, gulls and waders.

The reservoirs are major wintering grounds for wildfowl, including nationally important populations of shovelers and great crested grebes. They also attract significant numbers of goldeneye ducks, tufted ducks and goosanders. The reservoirs are also one of the capital's main roosting site for gulls; 70,000 of these have been recorded at one time, the majority being black-headed gulls, common gulls, lesser black-backed gulls and herring gulls.

Since the 1950s, the reservoirs have been providing a refuge for wildfowl while they are vulnerable during the late summer moult, and in some years, moulting flocks of great crested grebe have also used the reservoirs as a refuge. The reservoirs have also been used by migratory birds as a stopover site in autumn and spring, and yellow wagtail regularly breed here. A total of over 85 species of wetlands birds have been recorded at the site.

== See also ==
- List of Sites of Special Scientific Interest in Greater London
- King George V Reservoir
- William Girling Reservoir
