= Vancouver Harbour Board =

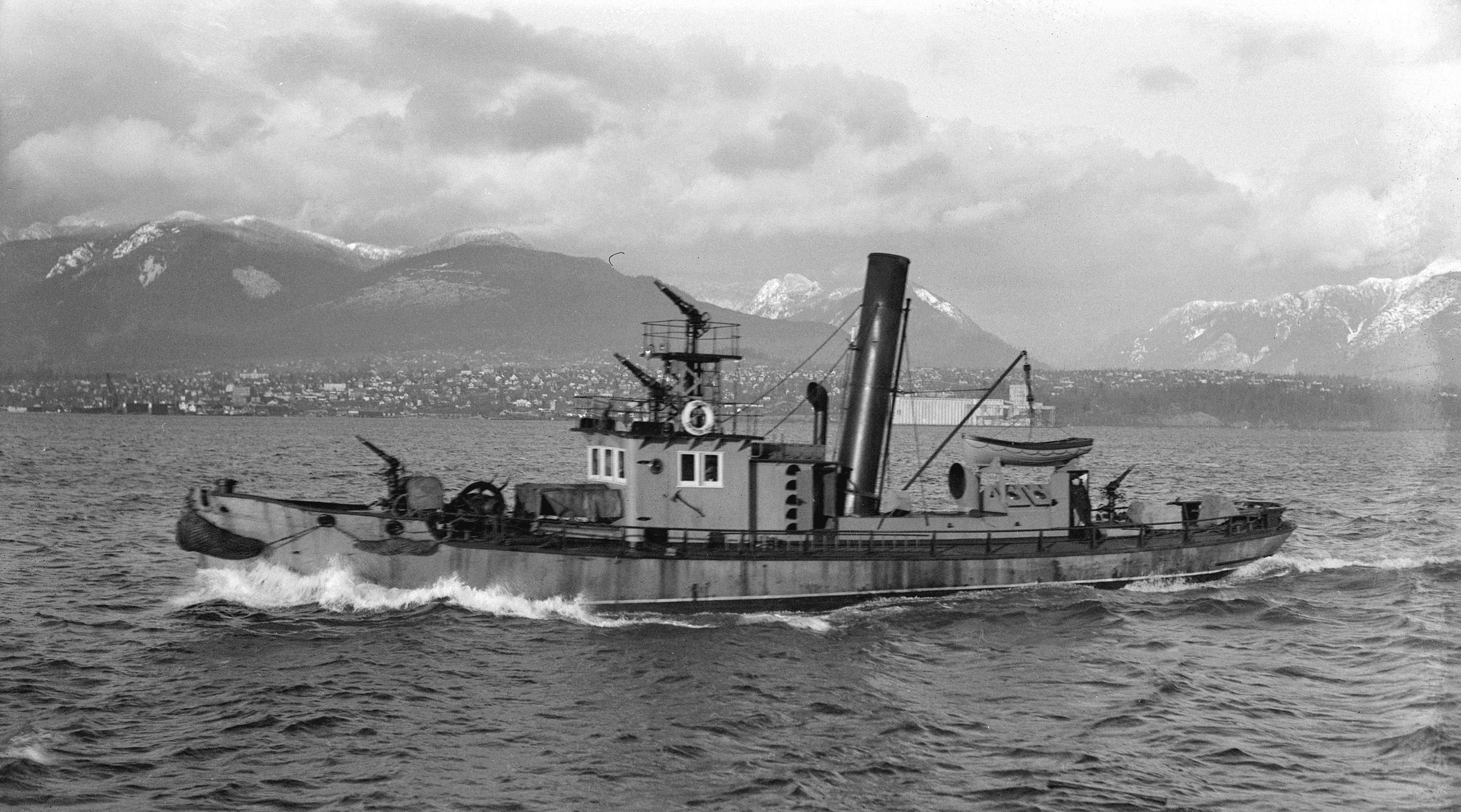
Among the Vancouver Harbour Board's duties were the management of fireboats like the Orion.

The Vancouver Harbour Board was created by Canada's Federal Parliament in 1914. The Board was responsible for a recommendation that the Federal government should dredge the First Narrows of Vancouver's Burrard Inlet, allowing larger ocean-going vessels to moor in Vancouver's inner harbour.

The Harbour Board operated harbour support vessels, like steam-powered fireboat Orion.
