= Brimsdown =

Coordinates: 51.660°N 0.026°W

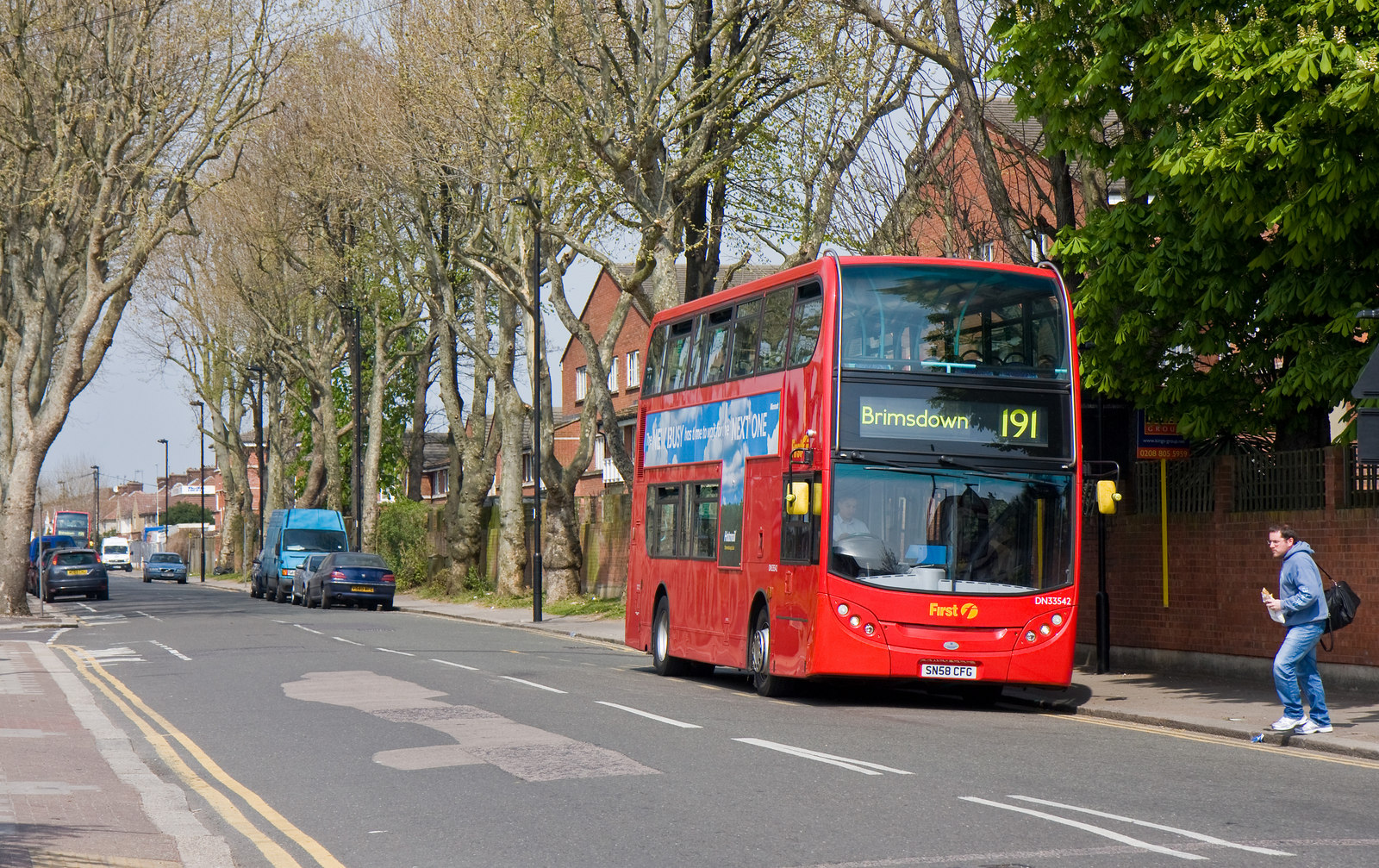
- Brimsdown Avenue

- Location within Greater London
- OS grid reference: TQ3697
- London borough: Enfield
- Ceremonial county: Greater London
- Region: London
- Country: England
- Sovereign state: United Kingdom
- Post town: ENFIELD
- Postcode district: EN3
- Dialling code: 020
- Police: Metropolitan
- Fire: London
- Ambulance: London
- UK Parliament: Enfield North
- London Assembly: Enfield and Haringey

Brimsdown is a neighbourhood of eastern Enfield in the London Borough of Enfield, north London, on the west side of the mid-to-lower Lea Valley.

== Geography ==
The east of Brimsdown, that is, east of the eastern Lea Valley line is one of the borough's main commercial centres. It divides into the Brimsdown Industrial Estate comprising Watermill, Sovereign, Leeside Business Centres, Riverwalk Business Park and storage. Its far north is the Enfield Power Station built on part of the former Brimsdown Power Station and an electricity sub-station.

Residential Brimsdown is south of Turkey Brook, extending as far south as Jeffreys Road by the two blocks of the Trafalgar and Centenary Trading Estate units. It is home to the Brimsdown Industrial Estate and also includes a residential area just west of the Lea Valley railway line. The western boundary is halfway to the other Lea Valley line for this station-centric neighbourhood, where used as a term.

This area was the easternmost part of the old parish of Enfield which ecclesiastically is today divided into six, the present relevant parish being Enfield Highway a secular division of Enfield which competes with the west of the area for its identity, particularly around the irregular polygon of Durants Park, a large park, which is shared between both areas.

The area east of the Lea Valley Lines railway is almost exclusively industrial use, whereas west is a residential area primarily built up from the 1930s which blends into Enfield Highway to the west, Ponders End to the south and to the north Enfield Wash and Enfield Lock. This residential area around Brimsdown Avenue, Brimsdown railway station and Brimsdown School is at the heart of a Brimsdown neighbourhood, within Enfield, identity.

== History ==
Brimsdown was recorded as Grymesdoun in 1420, Grymesdoune 1441, Grymes downe, Brymesdowne 1610, Grymsdown, Brimsdown 1686. The first element may be a surname Gryme. The second is the early and Middle English doun or down though unusually low for a down here referring to slightly raised ground in an area no more than 19 metres above sea level and 5 metres above the Lea, more than most of Edmonton to the south. Grīm as with Grim's Dyke to the west being linked to Woden.

In the 19th century the parish of Enfield had the second largest area north of the Thames in the two closest home counties for smallholdings run by families growing salads for the London market, with to a lesser degree fruit:

In 1867 there were several orchards at Enfield Highway and in 1869 market gardens accounted for much of the Connop estate in the eastern part of the parish. After inclosure the farms near the Lea continued to be split between arable and pasture, although fields formed out of the former common were very large in comparison with those farther west; one of Trinity College's farms at Brimsdown had fields of 44 a. and 60 acres (0.24 km^{2}) in 1855. Market gardens encroached increasingly on the farm-land between Hertford Road and the Lea during the later 19th century, until by 1900 Enfield was said to be the main parish for market gardening in northern Middlesex and the second in the whole county. Tomatoes and cucumbers were the main crops, although flowers were also grown, and glass-houses covered several hundred acres. By 1920, with the expansion of industry and suburban housing, some of the market gardens around Ponders End and Enfield Highway had disappeared

== Nearest railway stations ==
- Brimsdown railway station

== Watercourses ==
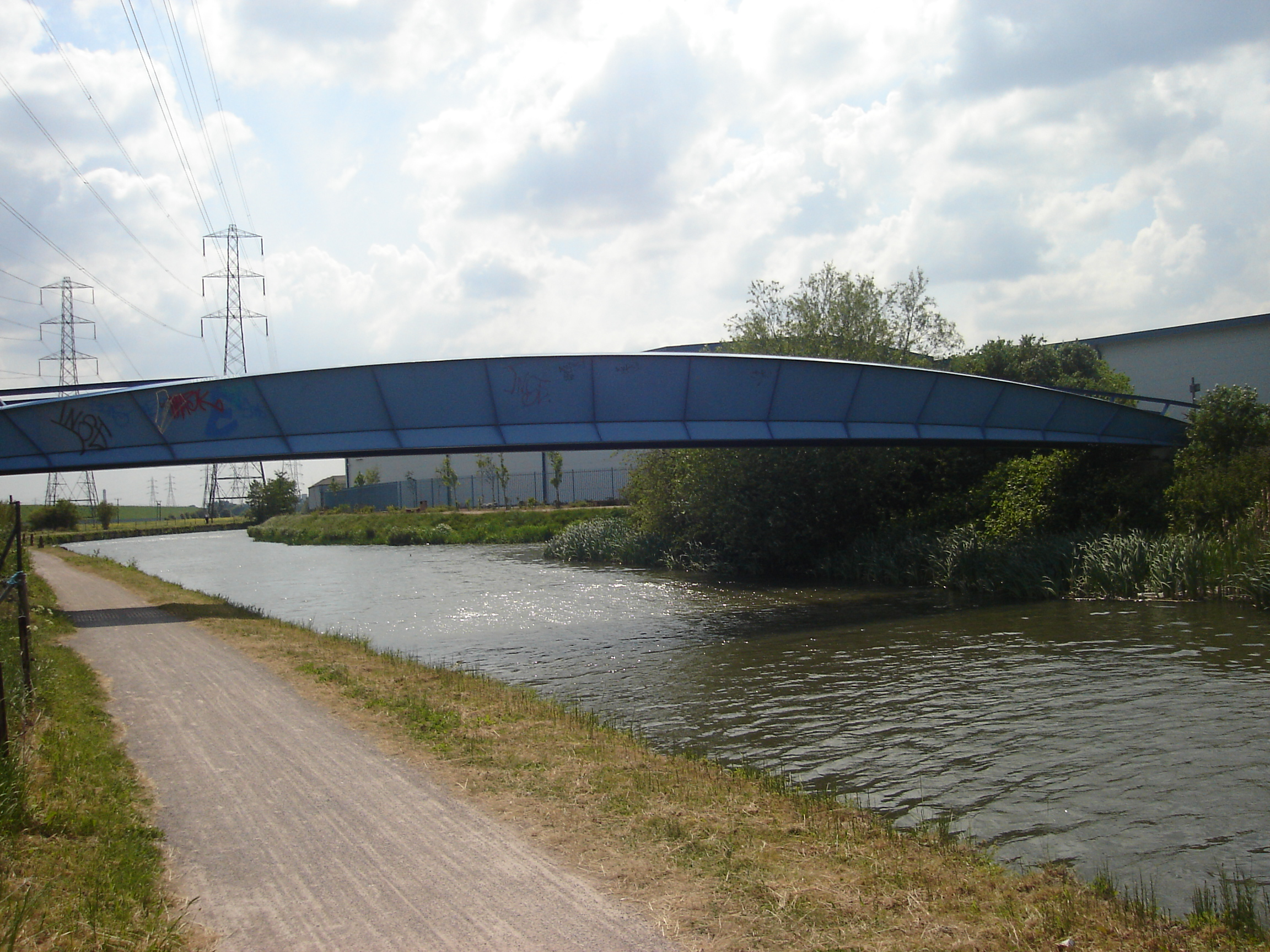
Mossops Bridge spans the Lee Navigation (completed 1999)

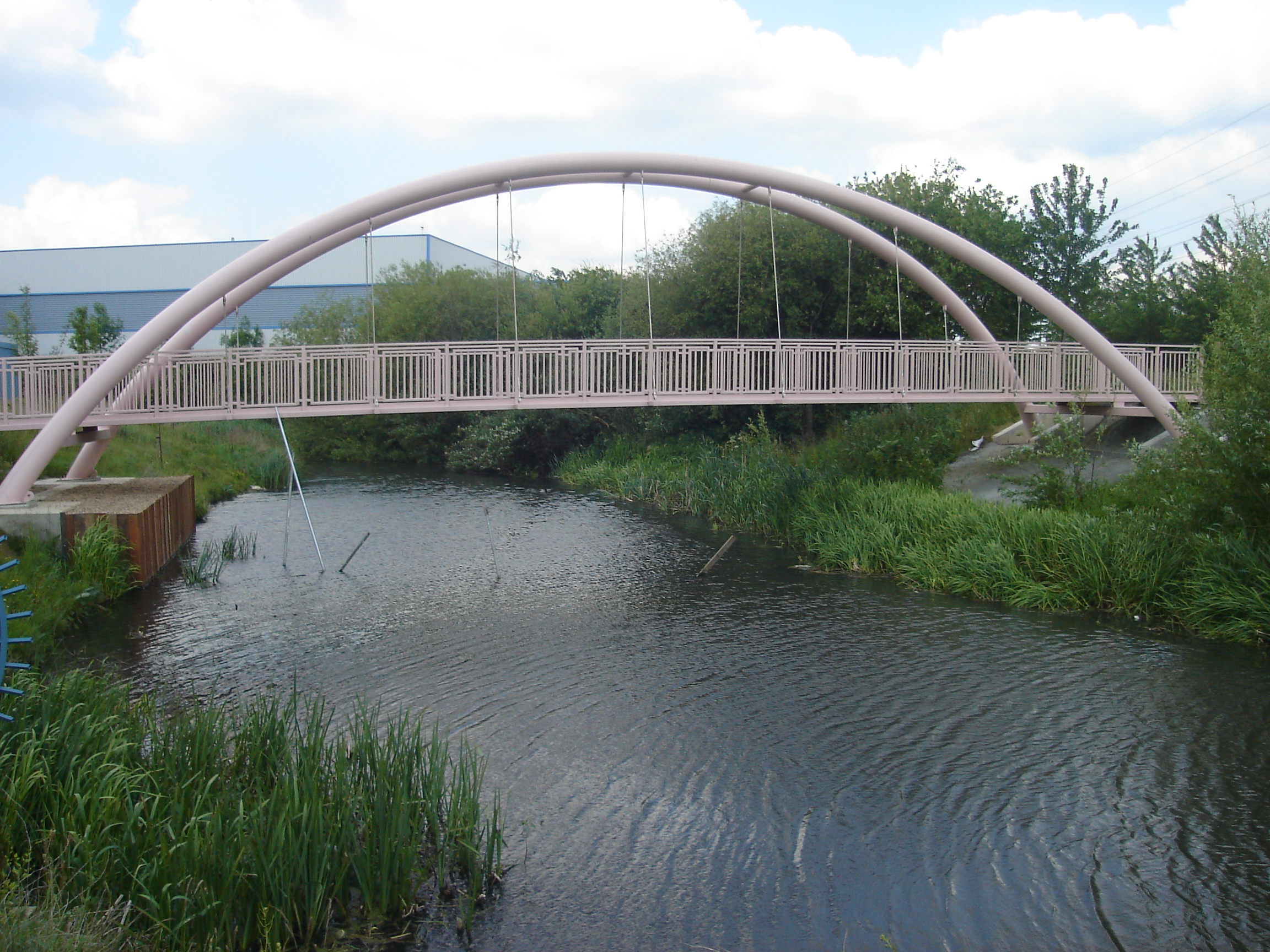
Mossops Creek Bridge (completed 2006)

- River Lee Navigation
- Mossops Creek was dug in the 1890s by Mosses and Co Gravel Extraction Company. The creek can be reached from Mossops Bridge (completed 1999) which spans the River Lee Navigation.

Mossops Creek Bridge (completed 2006) forms part of the Mossops Creek permissive path which links the Lee Navigation to the Brimsdown Industrial Estate and Brimsdown railway station.

== Politics ==
- Brimsdown is part of the Enfield North constituency in the House of Commons.
- Brimsdown is part of the Brimsdown ward for elections to Enfield London Borough Council.

== Schools and colleges ==
Primary schools

- Brimsdown Primary School, attended by academic Professor Philip Tew, cartoonist and illustrator Ian West, and actor Ray Winstone.

College

- Enfield College

== Sport ==
Football

- Brimsdown F.C.
- Brimsdown Rovers: David Beckham joined the club as a 14-year-old where he played in the youth side.
- Enfield Town FC : Goldsdown Park, Brimsdown is shared with Brimsdown Rovers AFC.

Angling

- Angling is allowed on the River Lee Navigation towpath between Enfield Lock and Ponders End Lock. Information from the River Lea Anglers Club.

== In popular culture ==
Between 1977 and 1980 a council house in the Green Street area of Brimsdown was the scene of alleged poltergeist activity. The incidents were the subject of a Sky Living television series The Enfield Haunting which was screened in May, 2015. Released in June 2016 The Conjuring 2 an American film also investigates the incidents.
