= Enfield Power Station =

Gas-fired power station in England

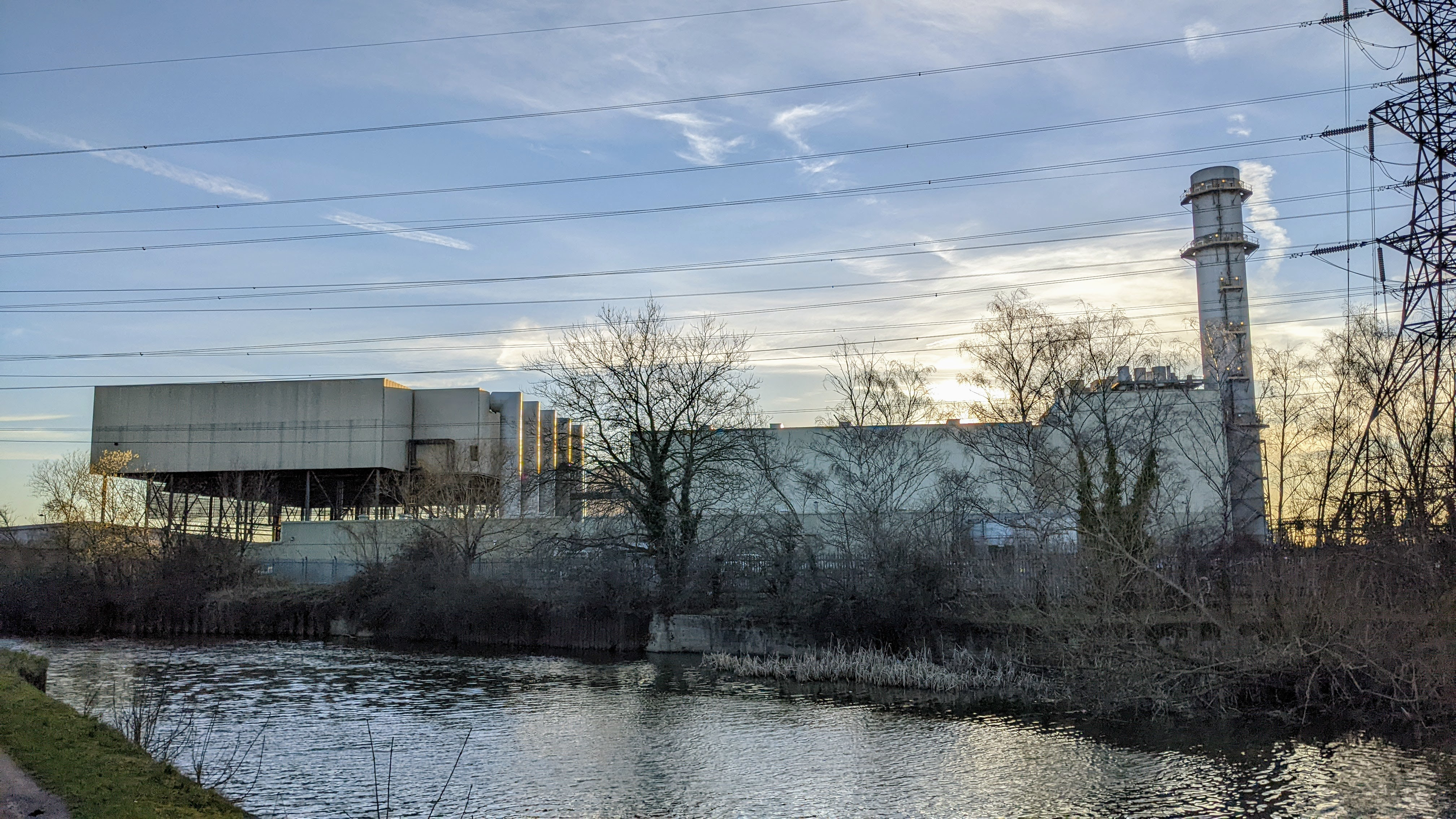
- Enfield Power Station viewed from the Lee Navigation towpath
- Country: England
- Location: Enfield
- Coordinates: 51°39′46″N 0°1′22″W
- Commission date: 1999
- Operator: Uniper

Thermal power station
- Primary fuel: Natural gas

Power generation
- Nameplate capacity: 442 MW

External links
- Website: www.uniper.energy/united-kingdom/power-plants-united-kingdom/enfield
- Commons: Related media on Commons

Enfield Power Station is a 442 MW gas-fired station, opened on part of the original Brimsdown Power Station site on Brancroft Way at Brimsdown in the North London Borough of Enfield. It is near the A1055 and Lee Valley Park.

== History ==
Known as Enfield Power Station (originally Enfield Energy Centre), construction was started in September 1997 and it was commissioned in December 1999. It was opened as the Enfield Energy Centre Ltd by original owners Indeck Energy Services and Enfield Holdings BV, itself jointly owned by NRG Energy Services and El Paso Energy.

E.ON UK bought it for £109 million on 6 May 2005 and operated it until January 2016 when the new company of Uniper was formed. It is one of seven power stations that Uniper owns and operates in the United Kingdom.

== Specification ==
It is a CCGT type natural gas power station. Using an Alstom GT26B2.2 gas turbine, to drive an electrical generator rated at 500 MVA and with a terminal voltage of 21 kV. Waste heat is recovered by a Combustion Engineering heat recovery steam generator to drive an Alstom Steam Turbine unit connected via a Synchro-Self-Shifting (SSS) clutch to the main powertrain. It connects to the National Grid via a transformer at 132 kV.
