= King George V Reservoir =

Reservoir in north London

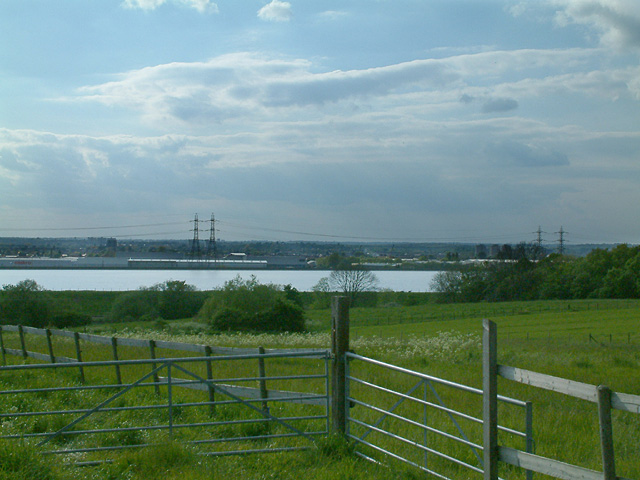
- Looking west across the reservoir

- Location within London Borough of Enfield
- Location: London Borough of Enfield
- Coordinates: 51.6499°N 0.0161°W
- Type: reservoir
- Basin countries: United Kingdom
- Max. length: 2.58 km (1.60 mi)
- Max. width: 0.95 km (0.59 mi)
- Surface area: 170 ha (420 acres)
- Max. depth: 7.5 m (25 ft)
- Water volume: 12.45 Gl (2.74×10^{9} imp gal)

The King George V Reservoir, also known as King George's Reservoir, is located in the London Borough of Enfield and is part of the Lee Valley Reservoir Chain that supplies London with drinking water. The storage reservoir is bordered by Sewardstone and Chingford to the east and Brimsdown and Ponders End to the west, and covers 420 acres (170 hectares), making it the largest in London. The reservoir and the nearby William Girling Reservoir are known collectively as the Chingford Reservoirs, and are owned and managed by Thames Water.

== History ==
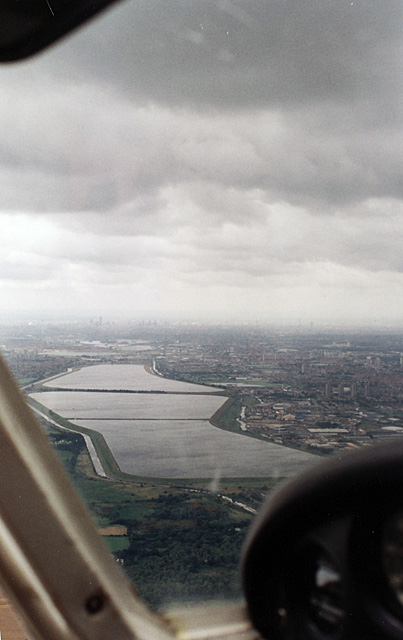
The Chingford Reservoirs: Looking south over the twin basins of the King George V Reservoir and the William Girling Reservoir in background

The reservoir was conceived as part of an overall plan for the Lea Valley and was laid before the Royal Commission on Water Supply (Balfour Committee) in 1893. At this time the responsible authority was the East London Waterworks Company. However, under the provisions of the Metropolis Water Act 1902, the undertakings of this as well as seven other companies were transferred to the Metropolitan Water Board.

Construction was started in 1908 and completed in 1912. The reservoir was opened by H.M.King George V in 1913, hence the name.

The Metropolitan Water Board operated the reservoir until the Board was abolished in 1974 under the provisions of the Water Act 1973 (c. 37) and ownership and control transferred to the Thames Water Authority. Under the provisions of the Water Act 1989 (c. 15) the Thames Water Authority was privatised as Thames Water.

== Description ==
The reservoir was formed by the construction of a continuous embankment on the floodplain of the River Lea at Chingford. An earth embankment divides the reservoir into two compartments that are connected by three large diameter culverts. The external grassed embankment consists of a central puddle clay core with shoulder filling comprising a mixture of river terraced gravels and alluvial deposits.

The reservoir embankment has a puddle clay core extending down into the underlying London Clay and gravel/earth shoulders at a slope of 1 in 3. The top of the embankment is 10 m above the surrounding land. The key engineering parameters are:

King George V Reservoir
Parameter	Value
Maximum embankment height	10 m
Length of Embankment	6,532 m
Total capacity	12.4 million m^{3} 12,400 megalitres
Surface area	2.168 km^{2}
Inflow capacity	375 Ml/d
Emergency drawdown	1.00 metres within 24hrs

Located in the NW corner is the original inlet pumping station by W.B. Bryan and finished in red brick and Portland stone. Still in situ are three of the five gas-fuelled liquid-piston pumps designed by H. A. Humphrey. In 1970 these were made redundant by the installation of a vertical spindle electric pump.

The emergency drawdown rate (the rate at which the water level in the reservoir can be reduced) was about 0.35 metres/day. Inspections in 2005-07 identified that this was inadequate, and proposed that the drawdown should be 1.0 m/d as defined in the provisions of the Reservoirs Act 1975 (c.23). This was achieved by installing twin 1.2 m diameter siphon pipes over the embankment. The valves controlling the outflow are 8.0 m high and have a flow capacity of 7 m^{3}/s. The siphons are located in the south east corner of the reservoir and discharge is into the River Lee Diversion.

== Ecology ==
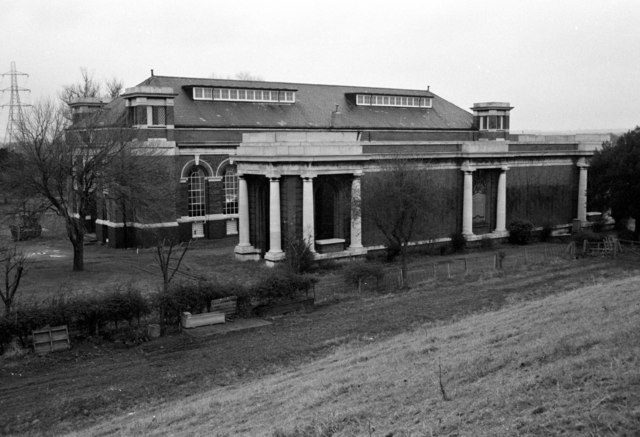
The pumping station, seen in 1985

The water is part of the Chingford Reservoirs Site of Special Scientific Interest (SSSI). It is a major wintering ground for wildfowl and wetland birds, including nationally important numbers of some species. The water also forms a moult refuge for a large population of wildfowl during the late summer months. A total of 85 wetland species have been recorded here in recent years.

== Recreation ==
The reservoir is popular with birdwatchers, and is home to the King George Sailing Club. Access has required permits and a key are required to visit the water, which were obtained from Thames Water. Since July 2016, access arrangements have been "under review", a process which is still ongoing in February 2020.

== Water supply ==
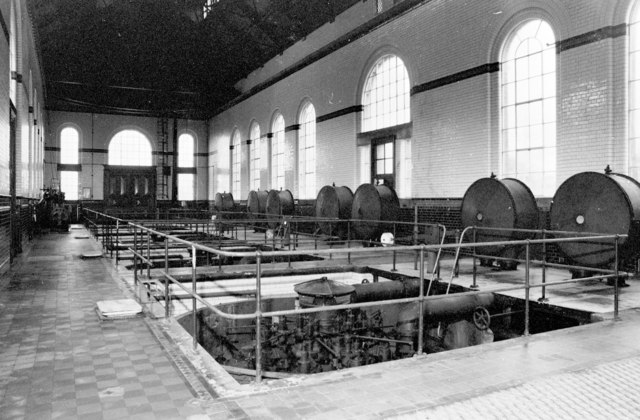
The interior of the pumping station, seen in 1985

Water is supplied to the reservoir from the New River, via the Northern Transfer Tunnel, and the River Lee Diversion.

== Access ==
Vehicular access is at Lea Valley Road A110

- Ponders End railway station
- London Buses route 313

== See also ==
- London water supply infrastructure
- List of Sites of Special Scientific Interest in Greater London

== Literature ==
- A Poacher's Tale. Told by A.T. Curtis. Related by Fred J Speakman. Includes several references to the reservoir. ISBN 0-7135-0969-4. Published 1960 by George Bell & Sons.
- An Edmonton Boy by Terry Webb. Reference to the reservoir on page 36. ISBN 1-903981-00-X. Published 2000 by Biograph.
