= Pond Lane Flood Gates =

Floodgate in the London Borough of Hackney, England

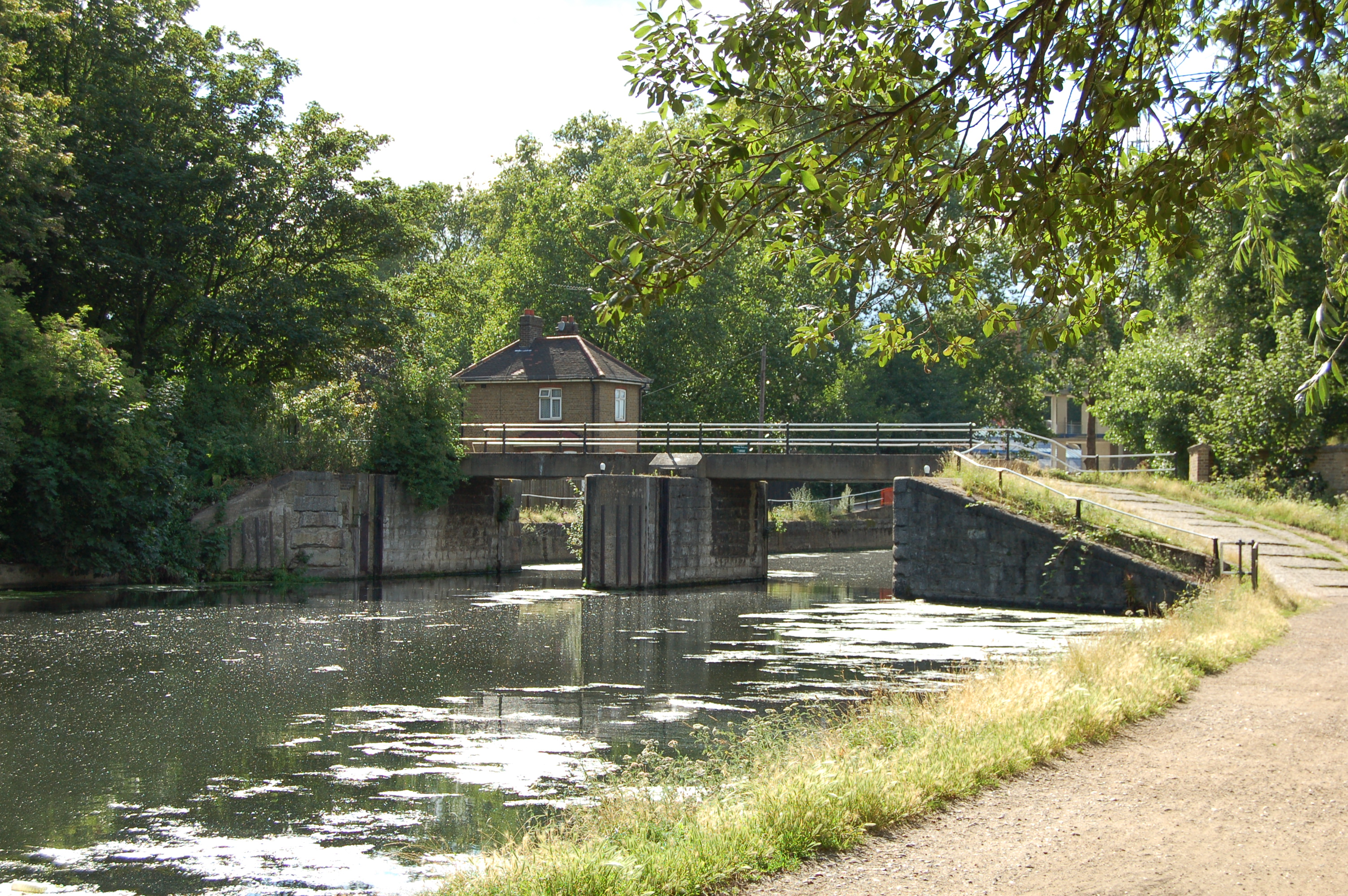
- Redundant flood gates, at the top of Hackney Cut, on the Lee Navigation.
- Interactive map of Pond Lane Flood Gates
- 51°33′39″N 0°02′37″W
- Waterway: River Lee Navigation
- County: Hackney; Greater London
- Operation: redundant
- Distance to Bow Creek: 3.0 miles (4.8 km)
- Distance to Hertford Castle Weir: 23.3 miles (37.5 km)

Pond Lane Flood Gates is a redundant flood defence structure, located near Lea Bridge Road on the River Lee Navigation in the London Borough of Hackney, England.

== History ==
The flood gates were the third water control structure to be built in the vicinity. When the Hackney Cut was first opened in 1769, the River Lea flowed over a weir, now known as the Middlesex Filter Beds Weir, to follow its original course, and the new cut was protected by Lea Bridge half lock, a single set of gates just below the start of the cut. These could be closed to prevent high levels on the river affecting the cut. Lea Bridge Lock was demolished in 1853, and was replaced by Pond Lane Lock at Cow Bridge in 1865, but it was only operational for seven years, as the navigation was rebuilt for larger barges, and was made level between Old Ford and Tottenham. Although the lock was no longer needed, it was retained so that it could be used to protect the cut from flooding as Lea Bridge half lock had once done. There were plans to fit it with gates pointing in both directions, to prevent draining of the cut below the gates if too much water was drawn from the river by the waterworks at Lea Bridge, but this was not carried out. The structure lasted until 1931, when it was demolished, to be replaced by the Pond Lane Flood Gates, a little further upstream. These consisted of vertical guillotine gates, which could be used to isolate the cut in times of flood, and were designed to help prevent flooding of Hackney Marsh.

The construction of the Thames Barrier caused the flood gates to become redundant and they were finally removed in 1987. The footbridge over the lock still remains.

== Location ==
The remains of the flood gates are located south of the Lea Bridge Road at Lea Bridge and adjacent to the former Middlesex Filter Beds which are now a nature reserve. The filter beds were built in 1852, to provide cleaner water to London, as a response to an outbreak of cholera three years before. They became redundant when the Coppermills Water Treatment Works was built at Walthamstow in 1969, and by the time Thames Water took over responsibility for them in 1974, they were already providing habitat for a range of plants and wildlife. They subsequently became part of the Lee Valley Regional Park in 1988, and the filter beds now provide areas of wet woodland, reed beds and open water. Over 60 varieties of birds have been seen at the reserve, which is close to the Waterworks Nature Reserve, a similar site occupying some of the Essex filter beds, which were built later than the Middlesex filter beds.

== Public access ==
Walking and cycling access to the gates is possible by following the Lea Valley Walk, which runs along the towpath of the Hackney Cut. The nearest railway station is Clapton railway station, which is about 0.5 miles (0.8 km) to the west of the gates.

== Bibliography ==
- Boyes, John; Russell, Ronald (1977). The Canals of Eastern England. David and Charles. ISBN 978-0-7153-7415-3.
- Thomas, Richard (2010). Lea Bridge half lock and lock and Pond Lane. History of the Lee and Stort Navigation. Richard Thomas. Archived from the original on 25 January 2025.

=== References ===
Next lock upstream	River Lee Navigation	Next lock downstream
Tottenham Lock; 2.5 miles	Pond Lane Flood Gates; Grid reference: TQ3559686530	Old Ford Lock; 1.7 miles
