= Old Ford Lock (disambiguation) =

Old Ford is a place within the London Borough of Tower Hamlets. A number of artificial waterways cross the district.

Old Ford Lock could refer to:

- Old Ford Lock on the Lee Navigation
- Old Ford Lock (Regent's Canal)
- Old Ford Three Locks on the Hertford Union Canal
- Old Ford Tidal Lock (defunct) on the Old River Lea
