= Hackney Cut =

Canal in East London

Coordinates: 51.5501°N 0.0287°W

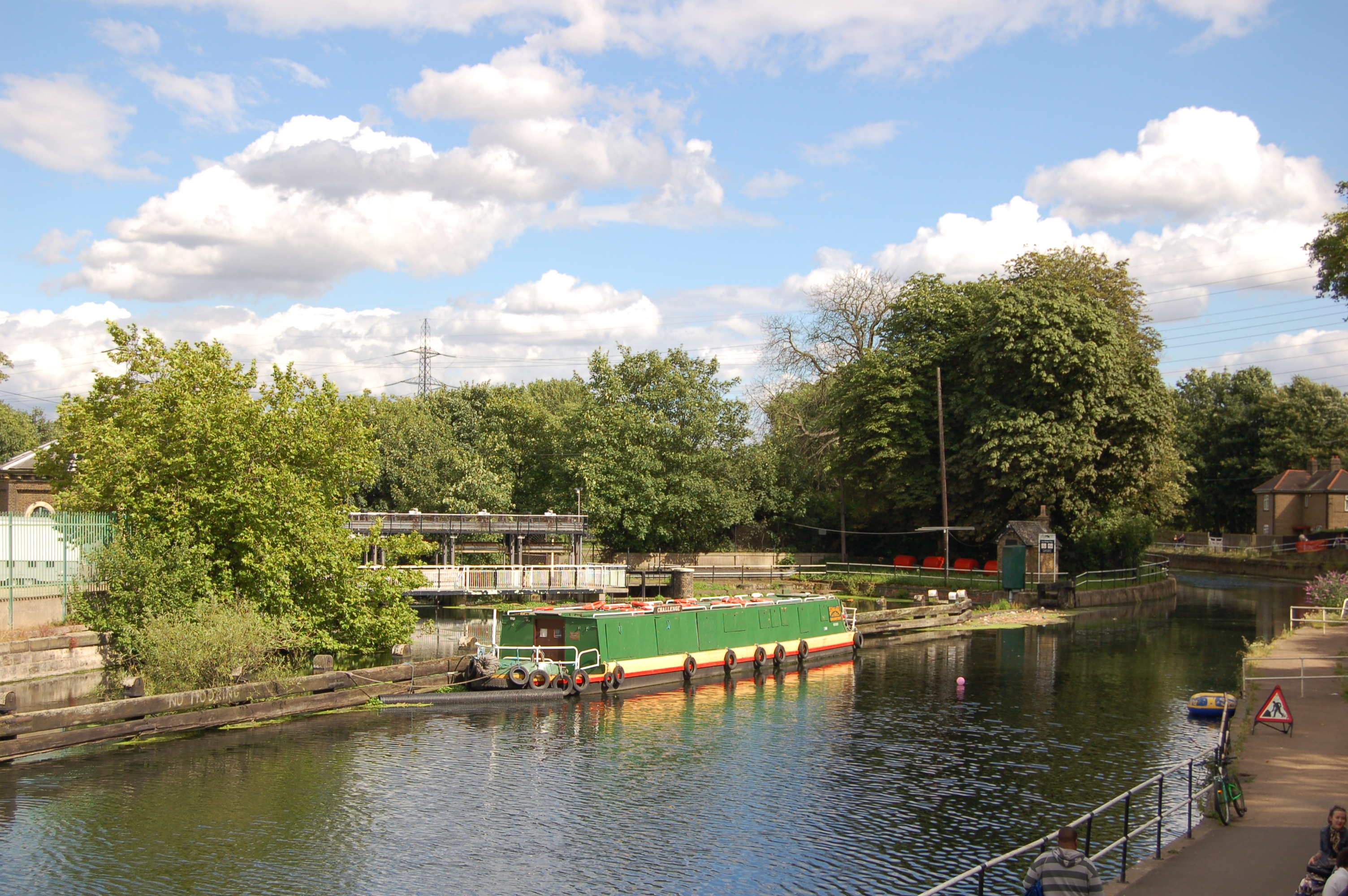
- The natural flow continues over the head of the Middlesex Filter Beds Weir, Hackney Cut continues the navigation to the right. The island between contains a nature reserve in the former filter beds.
- Interactive map of Hackney Cut

Specifications
- Locks: 1 pair
- Status: Open
- Navigation authority: Canal and River Trust

History
- Date of act: 1767
- Date of first use: 1769

Geography
- Start point: Lea Bridge
- End point: Old Ford
- Connects to: (part of) Lee Navigation

The Hackney Cut is an artificial channel of the Lee Navigation built in England in 1769 by the River Lea Trustees to straighten and improve the Navigation. It begins at the Middlesex Filter Beds Weir, below Lea Bridge, and is situated in the (modern) London Borough of Hackney. When built it contained two pound locks and a half-lock, but was rebuilt to handle larger barges in the 1850s, and now only Old Ford Lock, which is actually a duplicated pair, remains.

== History ==
The River Lea (or Lee) has a long history of use for navigation, with records indicating that the Abbot of Waltham was authorised to make improvements in 1190, and evidence for tidal gates at Bow from the reign of King Edward I, when Henry de Bedyk, the prior at Halliwell Priory and owner of the nearby tide mills, erected a structure some time before 1307. River levels were managed by flash locks or sluices, and as the volumes of traffic using the river increased, there was friction between the bargees and the millers, since use of a flash lock affected the head of water available at the adjacent mill. In 1765, the commissioners responsible for the river asked the engineer John Smeaton to survey the river and make recommendations for its improvement.

Smeaton produced his report in September 1766, in which he recommended that the flash locks should be replaced by pound locks with two sets of gates, and that a number of new cuts should be built, including what became known as the Hackney Cut from Lea Bridge to Old Ford. The commissioners advertised in the London Gazette and other newspapers that they wanted to borrow £35,000 to finance the improvements, to which there was a huge response. Some £161,500 was offered, and subscribers had to be picked by a ballot. Work on the whole scheme progressed quickly, and the contract for the Hackney Cut was awarded to Jeremiah Ilsley on 18 January 1768. He was probably acting as a public works contractor, since he also had contracts for the Waltham Cut and part of the Limehouse Cut, and so must have been managing a large labour force. He was to be paid 3 old pence (3d, 1.25p) per yard for the Hackney Cut, considerably less than the rate for the Limehouse Cut, which was 7d, and was given four months in which to complete the excavations.

Contracts for the construction of the locks were separate to the excavation, and the work on the two locks of the Hackney Cut was given to Henry Holland, a bricklayer from Piccadilly, on 23 April 1768. Despite tight schedules, the work seems to have been completed on time, and the Hackney Cut opened for traffic on 7 August 1769. At the northern end of the cut, the river flowed to the east, through a weir now known as Middlesex Filter Beds Weir. Beside it was Hackney Waterworks Lock, the third pound lock to be built on the Navigation in 1762. It was tidal, as the course of the Old River Lee was affected by tides from the Thames up to this point. The new cut was protected by Lea Bridge Half Lock, a single set of gates just below the junction. Homerton Lock, which was also known as Hackney Brick Cistern Lock, was about one-third of the way along the cut, while Old Ford Lock was located just above where the cut rejoined the old course of the river. The lock was semi-tidal, as the level on this section of the river was maintained by Bow tidal gates, but spring tides often flowed over the top of the gates and the locks which supplemented them after 1850, continuing to do so until the installation of extra flood walls and higher flood gates in 2000.

=== Development ===
An Act of Parliament obtained in 1850 paved the way for a major upgrade of the navigation. Among other things, it removed the restriction on the maximum load that could be carried by barges. This had been set at 40 tons in 1805, but with the clause removed, the navigation between the Thames and Tottenham was gradually rebuilt to take 100-ton barges.

Lea Bridge Lock remained in operation until 1853, when it was demolished. It was replaced by Pond Lane Lock, which was built in 1865 at Cow Bridge, about halfway between Lea Bridge and Homerton Lock. Seven years later, the navigation was rebuilt so that it was level from Tottenham to Old Ford, and the lock was then redundant, but was retained to help protect the navigation below it in times of flood. It was removed in 1931, when it was superseded by a new structure with vertical guillotine gates, located a little further upstream. These became redundant with the construction of the Thames Barrier, and the gates were removed in 1987. Homerton lock was removed in the 1860s, following dredging of the river down to Old Ford.

Old Ford Lock was rebuilt as a pair of locks on a different alignment in 1856, and the junction with the old course of the River Lee was reworked to remove an awkward bend. They were known as the small lock and the large lock, one being 15.75 feet (4.80 m) wide and the other being 18.25 feet (5.56 m) wide. Both were rebuilt with a width of 18.5 feet (5.64 m) in 1935, but retained their names, the small lock being shallower than the large lock. Further rebuilding had to take place during the Second World War after they were hit by a bomb on 19 October 1940, which also destroyed the lock houses. New lock houses were built in 1946, and were sold in the 1990s, after which they were used as the location for the television programme "The Big Breakfast".

From 1829, water was abstracted at Lea Bridge, from the natural watercourse, by the East London Waterworks Company, to avoid the increasing pollution of the Navigation. The waterworks was located to the south of Old Ford Locks, and the company built a canal in 1830 which ran along the east bank of the Hackney Cut to transfer water from Lea Bridge for processing. William Hoof, who had gained a reputation as a specialist tunnelling contractor, after working on Strood Tunnel for the Thames and Medway Canal and Harecastle Tunnel on the Trent and Mersey Canal, worked on the waterworks project from 1829 until 1834.

In 1824, George Duckett, the son of Sir George Duckett, 1st Baronet who had owned the Stort Navigation, obtained an Act of Parliament to link the Hackney Cut to the Regents Canal, which he hoped would result in much of the trade which passed onto the Thames from the Lee Navigation being re-routed to Regents Canal Dock. The Hertford Union Canal, which was 1.25 miles (2.0 km) long, included three locks, and joined the cut a short distance above Old Ford Locks, opened in 1830 but failed to attract much traffic, due to the level of tolls.

== Route ==
The Hackney Cut is 2 miles (3.2 km) long from Lea Bridge road bridge to Old Ford Locks. Excess water from the Navigation passes over the weir into the former natural channel of the River Lea that passes in a large meander to the east of the modern water course, forming the boundary with the London Borough of Waltham Forest. The old course used to rejoin the Navigation below Old Ford Lock, but this route was modified by the construction of Carpenter's Road Lock on the Bow Back Rivers in 1930. Prescott Channel was built at the same time to provide a bypass around the tide mill at Three Mills, allowing the water to reach Bow Creek and the River Thames. A lock was built in the Prescott Channel in 2009.

== Bibliography ==
- Boyes, John; Russell, Ronald (1977). The Canals of Eastern England. David and Charles. ISBN 978-0-7153-7415-3.
- Cumberlidge, Jane (2009). Inland Waterways of Great Britain (8th ed.). Imray Laurie Norie and Wilson. ISBN 978-1-84623-010-3.
- Skempton, Sir Alec; et al. (2002). A Biographical Dictionary of Civil Engineers in Great Britain and Ireland: Vol 1: 1500 to 1830. Thomas Telford. ISBN 0-7277-2939-X.
- Thomas, Richard (2010a). Bow Locks. History of the Lee and Stort Navigation. Richard Thomas.
- Thomas, Richard (2010b). Hackney Brick Cistern or Homerton Lock. History of the Lee and Stort Navigation. Richard Thomas.
- Thomas, Richard (2010c). Lea Bridge half lock and lock and Pond Lane. History of the Lee and Stort Navigation. Richard Thomas.
- Thomas, Richard (2010d). Old Ford Lock. History of the Lee and Stort Navigation. Richard Thomas.
