= William Hoof =

British civil engineer

William Hoof (c.1788–1855) was a British civil engineer.

He began his career with Daniel Pritchard and later became his son-in-law. In the 1820s, they founded Pritchard and Hoof, who specialised in building canal tunnels, including some of the most important of the era.

Pritchard and Hoof were the contractor for the construction of the reservoirs of the East London Waterworks at Lea Bridge from 1829 to 1834. They were the contractors for the Wigan Branch Railway constructed in 1830–32.

In the 1830s, Pritchard and Hoof split, and Hoof changed to building railway tunnels and cuttings, as Hoof and Sons. When his eldest son James died, this became Hoof and Hill, working with Thomas and James Hill, where work included the "notoriously difficult" London-Croydon railway.

On 11 August 1855, Hoof died at home, Madeley House, Kensington, London, of apoplexy. He was survived by four of his children, Egmont, Alfred, Mary Ann and Fanny Elizabeth.
