= Charles Greaves =

British engineer (1816–1883)

Charles Greaves M Inst CE FGS FRSA (1816–1883), eldest son of Charles Greaves (d. 1829), was born in Great Amwell, Hertfordshire, England on 19 October 1816. He was articled to J. M. Rendel, a civil engineer in Plymouth from 1831 to 1837. He was in India from 1842 to 1847 when he made a survey for the Great Western railway of Bengal. He was engineer of East London waterworks from 1851 to 1875. In October 1872, he was presented with £1000 for his services in carrying out improved filter beds, pumping engines, et cetera, at a cost of one million. He was engineer at Westminster chambers, Victoria St., London from 1875 to 1878. He became a fellow of the Royal Meteorological Society in 1851, and was president of that society in 1879. He had a meteorological observatory in Surrey St. London from 1878 to 1883. He died at Sunhill, Clevedon on 4 November 1883.
