= Old River Lea =

Coordinates: 51°32′17″N 0°1′11″W

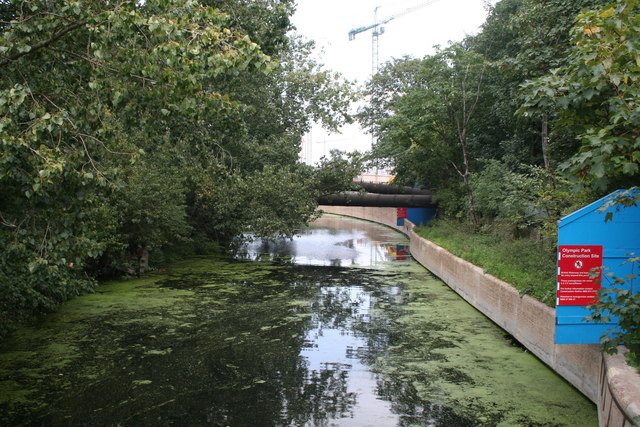
- Looking north east from its junction with the Navigation just below Old Ford Locks

Location
- Country: United Kingdom

Physical characteristics
- Source
  - location: Lea Bridge
- Mouth
  - location: River Lee Navigation and Bow Back Rivers
  - elevation: 0 m (0 ft)
- Length: 3.2 km (2.0 mi)

The Old River Lea is the former natural channel of the River Lea below Lea Bridge, in the London Borough of Hackney. The Old River forms a large meander from the Middlesex Filter Beds Weir to rejoin the main channel of the River Lee Navigation below Old Ford Lock.

The natural channel is joined by the River Lee Flood Relief Channel, and Dagenham Brook and a number of subsidiary channels to form the semi-tidal Bow Back Rivers, discharging into Bow Creek.

The natural channel forms the boundary between the London Boroughs of Hackney and Waltham Forest; and forms the eastern boundary of Hackney Marshes, and historically the western boundary of Leyton Marshes.

== See also ==
- List of rivers of England
- List of reservoirs and dams in the United Kingdom
- Locks and Weirs on the River Lee
- Lea Valley Walk
- Lower Lea Valley
