= East London Waterworks Company =

Water company supplying London, 1806–1904

Coordinates: 51.5328°N 0.01948°W

- Industry: Water supply
- Founded: 1806 in London, UK
- Defunct: 24 June 1904
- Fate: Municipalised
- Successor: Metropolitan Water Board

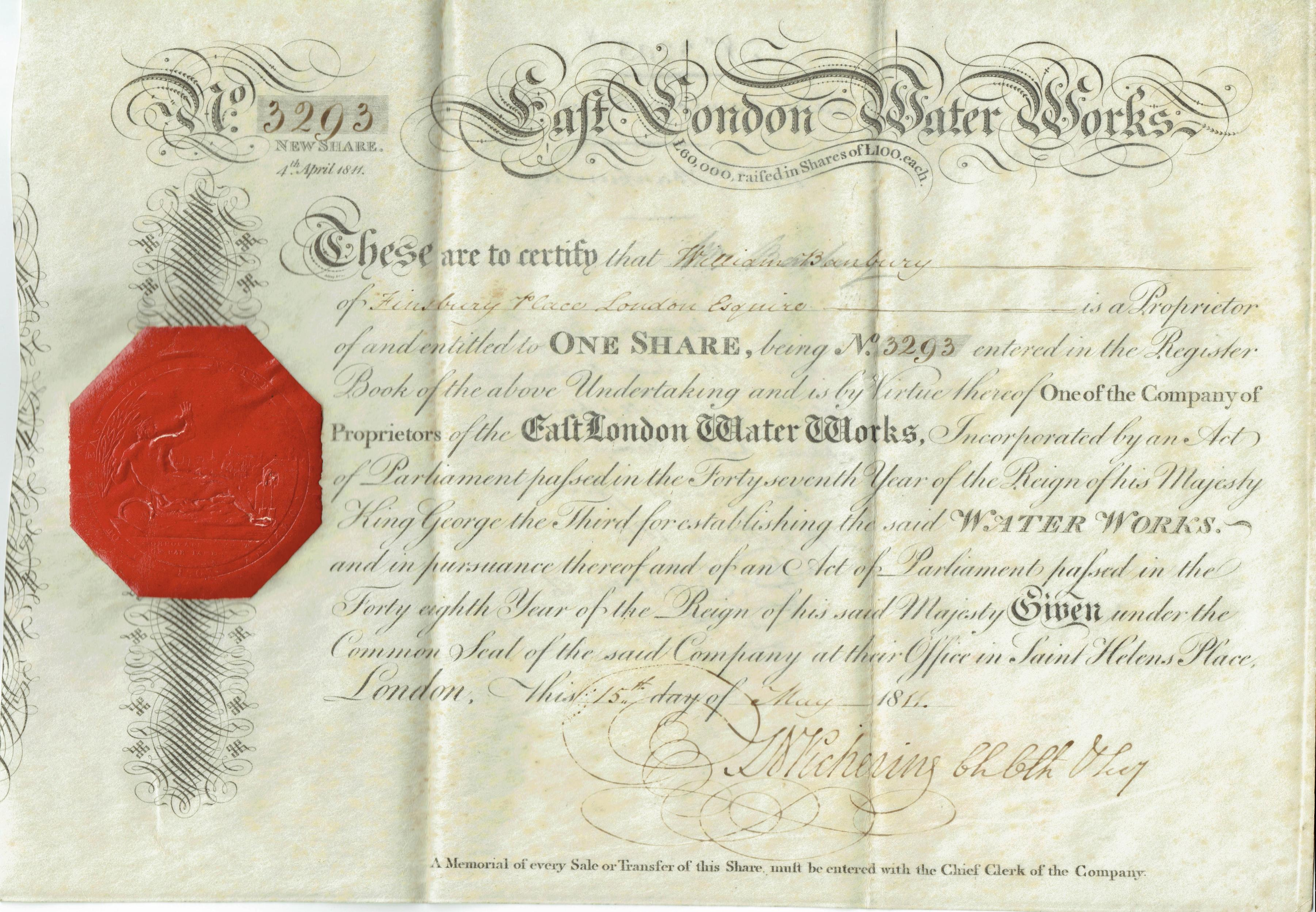
Share of the East London Water Works, issued 15 May 1811

The East London Waterworks Company was one of eight private water companies in London absorbed by the Metropolitan Water Board in 1904.

East London Waterworks Act 1807
- Act of Parliament
- Parliament of the United Kingdom
- Long title: An Act for better supplying with Water the Inhabitants of the Parishes of Stratford Bow, otherwise Stratford le Bow, Saint John Hackney, Saint Mary Islington, Saint Matthew Bethnell Green, and several other Parishes, Hamlets, Townships, and Places adjacent or near thereunto, in the Counties of Middlesex and Essex.
- Citation: 47 Geo. 3 Sess. 2. c. lxxii
- Territorial extent: United Kingdom

Dates
- Royal assent: 8 August 1807
- Commencement: 8 August 1807 (Note: The Acts of Parliament (Commencement) Act 1793.)
Other legislation
Amended by	East London Waterworks Act 1808; East London Waterworks Act 1829; East London Waterworks Act 1852; East London Waterworks (No. 2) Act 1852

Status: Amended

The company was founded by the East London Waterworks Act 1807 (47 Geo. 3 Sess. 2. c. lxxii).

East London Waterworks Act 1808
- Act of Parliament
- Parliament of the United Kingdom
- Long title: An Act to enable the Company of Proprietors of the East London Water Works to purchase certain other Water Works, and to amend an Act of the Forty-seventh Year of His present Majesty, relating to the said East London Water Works.
- Citation: 48 Geo. 3. c. viii
- Territorial extent: United Kingdom

Dates
- Royal assent: 21 March 1808
- Commencement: 21 March 1808
- Repealed: 25 July 1852
Other legislation
Amends	East London Waterworks Act 1807
Amended by	East London Waterworks Act 1829
Repealed by	East London Waterworks (No. 2) Act 1852

Status: Repealed

Text of statute as originally enacted

Under the East London Waterworks Act 1808 (48 Geo. 3. c. viii) the company acquired existing waterworks at Shadwell (dating from 1660) Lea Bridge (pre 1767) and West Ham (1743).

== Predecessor companies ==
=== Shadwell Waterworks ===
Shadwell Waterworks Act 1691
- Act of Parliament
- Parliament of England
- Long title: An Act for incorporating the Proprietors of the Water-works in the Parish of St. Paul's Shadwell, in the County of Middl'x; and for the encouraging, carrying on, and settling, the said Water-works.
- Citation: 3 Will. & Mar. c. 37 Pr.
- Territorial extent: England and Wales

Dates
- Royal assent: 24 February 1692
- Commencement: 22 October 1691 (Note: Start of session.)
- Repealed: 25 July 1852
Other legislation
Repealed by	East London Waterworks (No. 2) Act 1852
Relates to	West Ham Waterworks Act 1747

Status: Repealed

The Shadwell Waterworks Company commenced operations in 1669, and was incorporated (as the 'Governor and Company of the Water Works and Water Houses in Shadwell') in 1692 by the Shadwell Waterworks Act 1691 (3 Will. & Mar. c. 37 Pr.).

The Shadwell Waterworks were purchased for £50,000 in 1801 by the London Dock Company, using powers granted in the Port of London Improvement Act 1800 (39 & 40 Geo. 3. c. xlvii).

=== West Ham Waterworks ===
West Ham Waterworks Act 1747
- Act of Parliament
- Parliament of Great Britain
- Long title: An Act for empowering George Montgomerie and Thomas Byrd Esquires, and Ezra Patching, to complete an Undertaking, for furnishing the Inhabitants of the several Parishes and Places of Stratford, Westham, Bow, Bromley, Mile-End, Stepney, and other Parishes and Places adjacent, with Water, and for better securing then Property in such Undertaking.
- Citation: 21 Geo. 2. c. 8
- Territorial extent: Great Britain

Dates
- Royal assent: 25 March 1748
- Commencement: 10 November 1747
- Repealed: 25 July 1852
Other legislation
Repealed by	East London Waterworks (No. 2) Act 1852

Status: Repealed

Text of statute as originally enacted

Between 1743 and 1745, the West Ham Waterworks Company built a waterworks at Saynes Mill in Stratford. The company was incorporated by the West Ham Waterworks Act 1747 (21 Geo. 2. c. 8). This company was also purchased by the London Dock Company, using powers granted by the London Dock Company Act 1807 (47 Geo. 3 Sess. 2. c. v).

In 1785 the West Ham Waterworks Company and the Shadwell Waterworks Company agreed a boundary between their respective areas of supply, so they were not completing.

=== Hackney Waterworks ===
East London Waterworks Act 1829
- Act of Parliament
- Parliament of the United Kingdom
- Long title: An Act for better supplying the East London Waterworks with Water, and amending the several Acts relating to the said Waterworks.
- Citation: 10 Geo. 4. c. cxvii
- Territorial extent: United Kingdom

Dates
- Royal assent: 4 June 1829
- Commencement: 4 June 1829
Other legislation
Amends	East London Waterworks Act 1807; East London Waterworks Act 1808
Amended by	East London Waterworks (No. 2) Act 1852; East London Waterworks Act 1897; Metropolitan Water Board Act 1927
Relates to	Commercial Railway Act 1836

Status: Amended

Text of statute as originally enacted

The Hackney Water Works Company was established in around 1760 at Lea Bridge Mills. It was acquired from John Killick by the East London Waterworks, who were authorised to extract water at that location by the East London Waterworks Act 1829 (10 Geo. 4. c. cxvii)

== Water supply ==
The water supplied by the company was taken from the Lea, with waterworks on 30 acres (0.12 km^{2}) of land at Old Ford. A ceremonial opening took place in 1809.

In 1829, the source of water was moved further up river to Lea Bridge as a result of pollution caused by population growth. In 1770, the Hackney Cut, had been built across Hackney Marshes to avoid a 2 miles (3.2 km) meander of the natural river course; clean water was now abstracted from the natural channel to a new reservoir at Old Ford. In 1830 the company gained a lease on the existing reservoir at Clapton. This was replaced by a new reservoir at Stamford Hill in 1891.

== Supply area ==
Although the legislation that established the London water companies intended that they would compete for customers, in 1815 the East London company drew up a legal agreement with the New River Company defining a boundary between their areas of supply.

In 1841 the company supplied 36,916 houses. By 1903 this figure had risen to 223,891 houses, with the area of supply having a population of 1,482,156.

In 1845 the limits of supply were described as "all those portions of the Metropolis, and its suburbs, which lie to the east of the city, Shoreditch, the Kingsland Road, and Dalston; extending their mains even across the river Lea into Essex, as far as West Ham."

== Contamination ==
In 1866, during a cholera pandemic outbreak, where 5,973 Londoners perished, the East London Water Company was found guilty of supplying contaminated water taken from River Lea and stored into open reservoirs. Dead eels were found in water pipes, and foul water taken from the reservoirs and pumped into the main supply.

== Municipalisation ==
The Metropolis Water Act 1902 (2 Edw. 7. c. 41) amalgamated the eight private water companies into the Metropolitan Water Board, whose members were chosen by the various local authorities of the metropolitan area.

== See also ==
- London water supply infrastructure
- Charles Greaves
