= Metropolitan Turnpike Trust =

Responsible for maintaining the main roads north of London from 1827–1872

The Metropolitan Turnpike Trust (officially the Commissioners of the Turnpike Roads in the Neighbourhood of the Metropolis North of the River Thames) was the body responsible for maintaining the main roads in the north of the conurbation of London from 1827 to 1872. The commissioners took over from fourteen existing turnpike trusts, and were empowered to levy tolls to meet the costs of road maintenance.

== Creation ==
Metropolis Roads Act 1826 (Note: Section 1 of the Metropolis Roads Act 1863 (26 & 27 Vict. c. 78).)
- Act of Parliament
- Parliament of the United Kingdom
- Long title: An Act for consolidating the Trusts of the several Turnpike Roads in the Neighbourhood of the Metropolis, North of the River Thames.
- Citation: 7 Geo. 4. c. cxlii
- Territorial extent: United Kingdom

Dates
- Royal assent: 31 May 1826
- Commencement: 1 January 1827 (Note: Section 1.)
- Repealed: 1 July 1872
Other legislation
Repeals/revokes	Old Street Road Act 1756; Old Street Road Act 1772; Jeremy's Ferry Bridge, River Lee Act 1778
Amended by	Metropolis Roads Act 1863
Repealed by	Annual Turnpike Acts Continuance Act 1871

Status: Repealed

Text of statute as originally enacted

There was pressure from business interests in north London, who found that the numerous toll-gates throughout the area were interfering with the passage of goods and conduct of trade. John Loudon McAdam persuaded Parliament to consolidate all the turnpike roads in the London area under one Metropolitan Turnpike Trust in 1825, to which he was appointed Surveyor-General. The Metropolitan Trust was created by a local act of Parliament, the Metropolis Roads Act 1826 (7 Geo. 4. c. cxlii). The fourteen trusts consolidated were:

- Kensington
- Brentford
- Isleworth
- Uxbridge
- Marylebone
- Harrow
- Kilburn
- Highgate and Hampstead
- City Road
- Stamford Hill and Green Lanes
- Old Street
- Hackney
- Lea Bridge
- Camden Town

The total length of roads was 129 1/4 miles, and Sir James McAdam was appointed General Surveyor of the Metropolis Turnpike Roads north of the Thames.

== Commissioners ==
The commissioners initially consisted of the members of parliament for the City of London, City of Westminster, and County of Middlesex along with forty peers and gentlemen named in the 1826 act. Any vacancies occurring after this were to be filled by co-option.

== Metropolitan Turnpikes Act 1829 ==
Metropolis Roads Act 1829
- Act of Parliament
- Parliament of the United Kingdom
- Long title: An Act to amend an Act of the Seventh Year of His present Majesty, for consolidating the Trusts of the several Turnpike Roads in the Neighbourhood of the Metropolis, North of the River Thames, and to make and maintain Two New or Branch Roads to communicate with the said Metropolis Roads.
- Citation: 10 Geo. 4. c. 59
- Territorial extent: United Kingdom

Dates
- Royal assent: 19 June 1829
- Commencement: 19 June 1829
- Repealed: 1 July 1872
Other legislation
Amends	Metropolis Roads Act 1826
Amended by	Metropolis Roads Act 1863
Repealed by	Annual Turnpike Acts Continuance Act 1871

Status: Repealed

Text of statute as originally enacted

A further, public, act – the Metropolis Roads Act 1829 (10 Geo. 4. c. 59) – was passed which placed the commissioners on a statutory basis, and gave them increased powers. They were empowered to construct three new roads:

1. From Stamford Hill to Camden Town (the present Seven Sisters Road/Camden Road)
2. A short realignment of the main Hertford Road at Enfield Highway (the former route becoming "Old Road")
3. A road from the Lea Bridge Road in Walthamstow to the main London – Epping Turnpike Road: the modern Woodford New Road.

A number of roads in central London were declared highways and transferred from the care of the commissioners to the local parish authorities. The roads remaining under the trust were organised into sixteen districts, with different tolls applied, and the funds gathered being applied to the maintenance of the roads in the district:

- First District: Roads in Westminster, Kensington, Chelsea, Fulham, Ealing and Hanwell, including the Great West or Old Brentford Road from Knightsbridge to Brentford.
- Second District: The remainder of the Great West Road from Brentford to Bedfont along with other main roads in Isleworth, Hounslow, Teddington and Twickenham.
- Third District: Comprised the Uxbridge Road west from Tyburn to the seventh mile stone, and Church Lane, Kensington.
- Fourth District: Included the remainder of the Uxbridge Road, and the present Hanger Lane / Gunnersbury Avenue.
- Fifth District: A projected road from the Uxbridge Road at Shepherd's Bush to Turnham Green on the Great West Road.
- Sixth District: The road from Paddington to Harrow-on-the-Hill.
- Seventh District: The modern Maida Vale and Kilburn High Roads.
- Eighth District: The Edgware Road (running from Kilburn in the Seventh District to Edgware).
- Ninth District: The modern Euston Road with other main roads in St Pancras, Islington and Kentish Town.
- Tenth District: The City Road.
- Eleventh District: The road from Shoreditch to Lower Edmonton.
- Twelfth District: The continuation of the road in the Eleventh District from Lower Edmonton to the Hertfordshire/Middlesex boundary at Cheshunt.
- Thirteenth District: The Green Lanes Road from Newington Green to Enfield.
- Fourteenth District: The Seven Sisters Road.
- Fifteenth District: Main roads in Hackney and Shoreditch.
- Sixteenth District: Lea Bridge Road and the new road to Woodford.

== Competition from the railways ==
In 1838 the trust gathered tolls to the value of £83,497. By 1840 the amount had declined to £67,475 as a direct result of the opening of railways in the capital. The commissioners were forced to look for economies, and in 1841 they announced that they would cease to light the roads, and offered the light fittings to the parish vestries along the roads free of charge. In some parts of the metropolis the vestries refused, or were unable, to take over the lighting.

New North Road Act 1849 (Note: Section 2.)
- Act of Parliament
- Parliament of the United Kingdom
- Long title: An Act for continuing the Term of an Act passed in the Third Year of the Reign of His Majesty King William the Fourth, intituled "An Act for continuing certain Powers to the Trustees of the New North Road, leading from the South End of Highbury Race, Islington, to Haberdashers Walk in the Parish of Saint Leonard Shoreditch in the County of Middlesex," and for vesting the Management of the said Road in the Metropolis Roads Commissioners, for the Purpose of paying off the Debt due thereon.
- Citation: 12 & 13 Vict. c. lxvi
- Territorial extent: United Kingdom

Dates
- Royal assent: 28 July 1849
- Commencement: 31 October 1849
Other legislation
Amends	New North Road Act 1833
Amended by	New North Road Amendment Act 1850

Status: Amended

Text of statute as originally enacted

New North Road Amendment Act 1850 (Note: Section 6.)
- Act of Parliament
- Parliament of the United Kingdom
- Long title: An Act to explain and amend the New North Road Act, 1849.
- Citation: 13 & 14 Vict. c. xxxii
- Territorial extent: United Kingdom

Dates
- Royal assent: 25 June 1850
- Commencement: 25 June 1850 (Note: The Acts of Parliament (Commencement) Act 1793.)
Other legislation
Amends	New North Road Act 1849

Status: Current legislation

Text of statute as originally enacted

In spite of the declining finances, the commissioners were given more responsibilities: the New North Road from Highbury to Shoreditch was placed under their care by the New North Road Act 1849 (12 & 13 Vict. c. lxvi), and the New North Road Amendment Act 1850 (13 & 14 Vict. c. xxxii) gave them the roads of the Marylebone and Finchley Turnpike Trust.

== Ending of the turnpikes in the Metropolis ==
Metropolis Roads Act 1863
- Act of Parliament
- Parliament of the United Kingdom
- Long title: An Act to amend the Acts relating to the Turnpike Roads in the Neighbourhood of the Metropolis North of the River Thames.
- Citation: 26 & 27 Vict. c. 78
- Territorial extent: United Kingdom

Dates
- Royal assent: 28 July 1863
- Commencement: 1 July 1864 (Note: Section 3.)
- Repealed: 1 July 1872
Other legislation
Amends	Metropolis Roads Act 1826; Metropolis Roads Act 1829
Repealed by	Annual Turnpike Acts Continuance Act 1871

Status: Repealed

Text of statute as originally enacted

By the 1850s the unpopular tolls were under attack. A parliamentary Toll Reform Committee was formed, and in 1857 it issued a report. In it, it was pointed out the commission itself was unrepresentative: it contained four MPs from the City of London, which was untolled, and two from Westminster, which had only one gate. However, the constituencies of Finsbury, Marylebone and Tower Hamlets, which were heavily tolled, had no representation. The campaign eventually led to the enactment of the Metropolis Roads Act 1863 (26 & 27 Vict. c. 78). From 1 July 1864 the tollgates were to be removed from most of the roads, with administration passing to the incorporated vestries and district boards established by the Metropolis Management Act 1855 (18 & 19 Vict. c. 120).

The commissioners retained control of arterial roads outside the area of the Metropolitan Board of Works:

- The "Great West Road" from the Hammersmith boundary to Isleworth.
- The "Uxbridge Road" from Hammersmith boundary to Uxbridge.
- The "Harrow Road" from the Hampstead boundary to Harrow.
- The "Kilburn Road" from the Hampstead boundary to Sparrows Herne in Hertfordshire
- The "Green Lanes Road" outside the Metropolis
- The "Seven Sisters Road" from the Islington boundary
- The "Stamford Hill Road" from the Hackney boundary to Enfield
- The "Lea Bridge Road" from the Hackney boundary to Snaresbrook.

== Abolition ==
The commissioners went out of existence on 1 July 1872, when section 13 of the Annual Turnpike Acts Continuance Act 1871 (34 & 35 Vict. c. 115) came into effect. The roads under the care of the trust passed to the various parish vestries on that date.
