= Old Ford Lock =

Lock on the River Lee Navigation, London, England

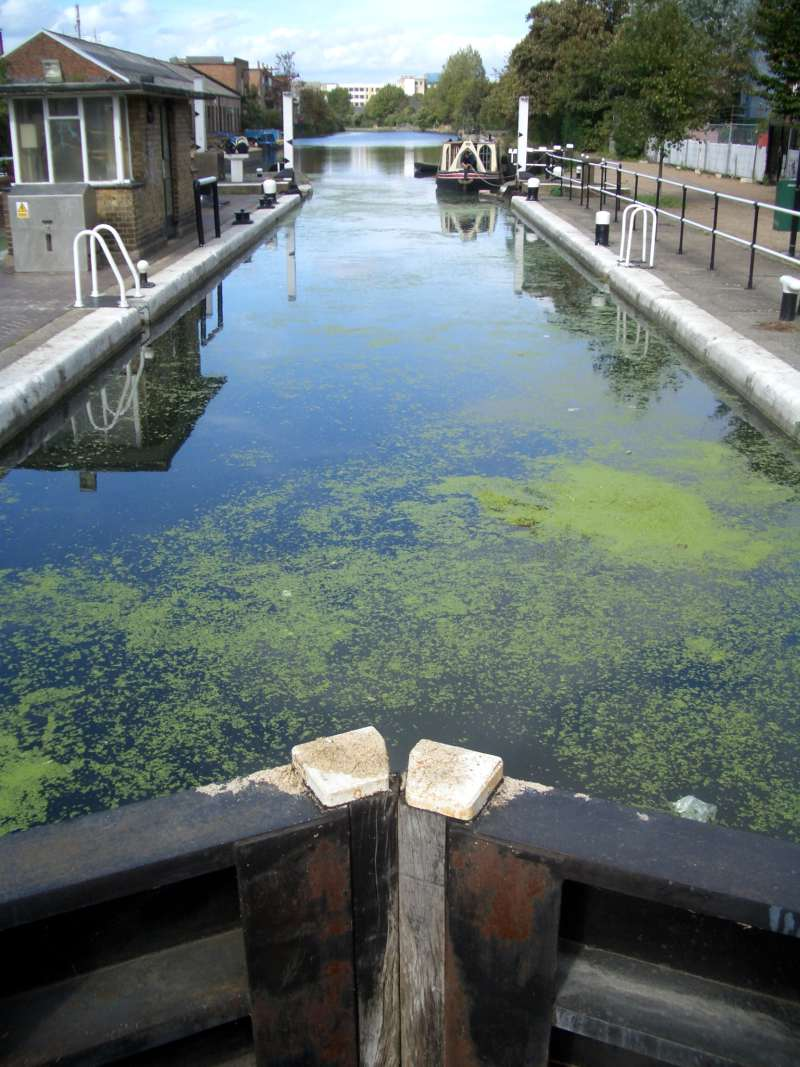
- Old Ford Lock, Lee Navigation
- Interactive map of Old Ford Lock
- 51°32′17″N 0°01′15″W
- Waterway: River Lee Navigation
- County: Tower Hamlets; Greater London
- Maintained by: Canal & River Trust
- Operation: Mechanical/Manual
- Length: 88 feet (27 m)
- Width: 19 feet 6 inches (5.9 m)
- Fall: 9 feet 5 inches (2.9 m)
- Distance to Bow Creek: 1.25 miles (2 km)
- Distance to Hertford Castle Weir: 26.75 miles (43 km)

Old Ford Lock is a paired lock and weir on the River Lee Navigation, in the London Borough of Tower Hamlets, England. It is at Fish Island in Old Ford and takes its name from the natural ford which used to cross the River Lea.

The lock-keepers cottages on Dace Road are best known for their use on Channel 4's breakfast TV show The Big Breakfast.

On the opposite bank from the lock-keeper's cottages was the former factory of Percy Dalton, a London peanut processor, notable for their production of roasted nuts in their shells. The company began at this site, in Dace Road, in the 1930s, but is now based in Suffolk.

== Tidal section ==
Old Ford Lock marks the start of the Hackney Cut – an artificial channel built in the 18th century to cut off a large loop in the natural channel. The natural river rejoins the Navigation at this point – below the lock, having travelled 2 miles (3.2 km) from the Middlesex Filter Beds Weir, just below Lea Bridge; and passing to the east of the Navigation.

The Old River Lea (the natural channel), is joined by the River Lee Flood Relief Channel, and Dagenham Brook before connecting to the Bow Back Rivers, which join the tidal Bow Creek. Before the 1930s, there were tide gates installed on this channel to only permit boats to pass when the level in the (at that time) semi-tidal Lee Navigation and tidal Old River were the same. After the 1930s flood works on the Bow Back Rivers, and construction of the Carpenter's Road and Marshgate Lane locks, these – and the Pond Lane Flood Gates were redundant as this section was controlled by the new locks – and the (then) tidal lock at Bow Locks.

In 2000, Bow Locks were modified to keep the tide out; this reduced silting in this section of the canal – and made the water level completely controlled.

== In popular culture ==
=== The Big Breakfast ===
Lock-keepers cottages, 2006

For ten years, the neighbouring old Lock-keeper's cottages were used for television filming of The Big Breakfast, Channel 4's early morning show. The three cottages, which were converted into a single house for the show, were compulsorily purchased as part of the Olympic Stadium development plans for the 2012 Summer Olympics. In 2020, the house was again sold having been renovated and is now a private residence.

=== Breaking and Entering ===
An old foundry next to The Big Breakfast house was used as the main movie location for Anthony Minghella's film Breaking and Entering, starring Jude Law and Juliette Binoche.

== Public access ==
Pedestrian and cycle access via the towpath which forms part of the Lea Valley Walk.

The nearest London Overground station is Hackney Wick on the Mildmay line. The nearest Docklands Light Railway station is Pudding Mill Lane. The nearest London Underground station is Bromley-by-Bow on the Hammersmith & City and District lines.

== See also ==
- Old Ford Lock (Regent's Canal)
- Old Ford Three Locks (Hertford Union Canal)

Next lock upstream	River Lee Navigation	Next lock downstream
Pond Lane Flood Gates; 1.7 miles	Old Ford Lock; Grid reference: TQ372840	Bow Locks; 1.25 miles
