= Middlesex Filter Beds Weir =

Weir on the River Lea in London, England

Coordinates: 51.5617°N 0.0445°W

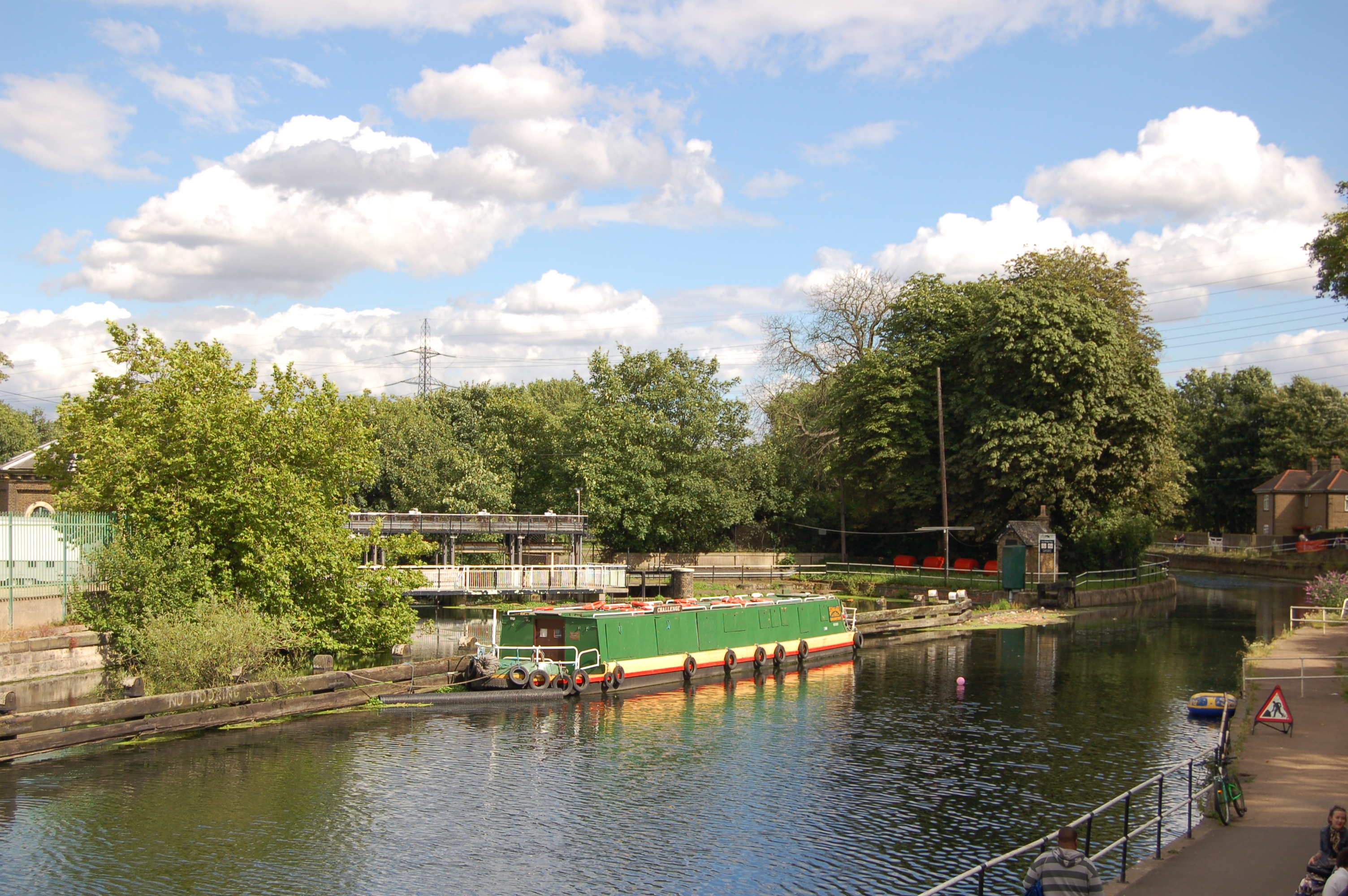
The natural flow continues over the head of the weir, Hackney Cut continues the navigation to the right. The island between, contains a nature reserve in the former filter beds.

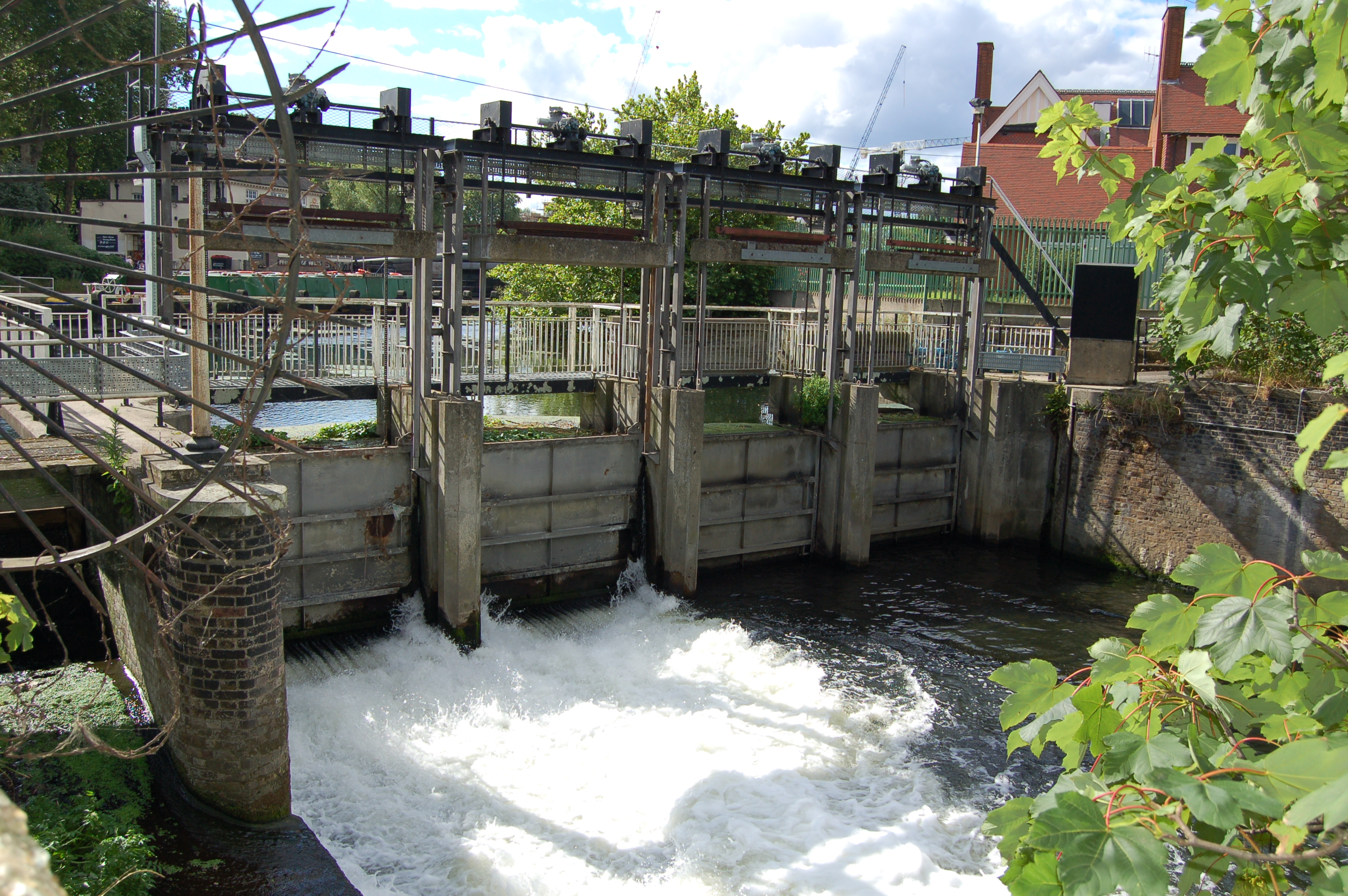
The tail of the weir

The Middlesex Filter Beds Weir, or Lea Bridge Road Weir, marks the start of the Hackney Cut, an artificial channel of the River Lee Navigation built in 1770, in the London Borough of Hackney, England. The weir lies between the former Middlesex Filter Beds to the south, which are now a nature reserve, and the Thames Water treatment works at Lea Bridge Road to the north.

== History ==
The River Lea had been used for commercial navigation since at least 1190, when the Bishop of Ely instructed the Sheriff of Essex that the Abbot of Waltham would be altering the course of the river to improve navigation. As with many river navigations, there were disputes over water rights between those using the river for navigation and millers using it to power their mills. The river trustees asked John Smeaton on 5 August 1765 to advise on what could be done to improve the siltation. A second request was made in 1766, when Thomas Yeoman was asked to assist. Smeaton's report was presented in September 1766, in which he suggested the use of pound locks, rather than flash locks, and the creation of several new cuts to improve the channel. He mentioned that there was already a cistern or lock at Hackney Waterworks, which was used occasionally, and one of the new cuts was to be at Hackney. The work was authorised by the River Lee Navigation Act 1767 (7 Geo. 3. c. 51), which gained Royal Assent on 29 July 1767.

Yeoman was appointed to be surveyor for the works, and seems to have acted as resident engineer. The trustees decided that they would borrow £35,000 in order to finance the work, which was easily obtained, and a contract for building the Hackney Cut was awarded to Jeremiah Isley on 18 January 1868. Isley must have had a large labour force, since he also had contracts for the Waltham Cut and parts of the Limehouse Cut. He would be paid three pence per yard for finishing the Hackney Cut, and only had four months to do so. The cut was 2 miles (3.2 km) long, and left the original course of the river where it turned to the east just below Lea Bridge. The cut was opened on 7 August 1769, and a weir enabled some water to flow along the original course of the river, now known as the Old River Lea. A single set of gates, known as Lea Bridge half lock, was located at the head of the new cut. The gates were closed when river levels were high, diverting all flow over the weir to prevent flooding along the cut.

The navigation was rebuilt in the 1850s and 1860s, to allow larger vessels to reach Tottenham. Since 1805, barges had been restricted to carrying 40 tons, but this was increased to 100 tons. Lea Bridge Half Lock was removed in 1853, to be replaced by Pond Lane Lock, a little further downstream.

The land on either side of the Old River Lea below the weir, bounded to the south by the Hackney Cut was used as the site for a waterworks by the East London Waterworks Company. The works were constructed in 1852-53, and provided drinking water to the local community. It continued in use until 1969. The triangular area between the Old River Lea and the Hackney Cut was known as the Middlesex filter beds, and this gave rise to the name of the weir. Following closure, the Middlesex filter beds became a wetland nature reserve, supplied with water from the river. However, repeated thefts of the pumping equipment meant that the beds were allowed to dry out in 2018, due to the costs of replacing the pumps. They remained dry until 2024, when Pick Everard completed the installation of a secure pumping system to maintain water levels.

Excess water from the Navigation passes over the weir into the former natural channel of the River Lea that passes in a large loop to the east of the modern water course, as the Old River Lea. The natural water course travels 2 miles (3.2 km) and rejoins the Navigation below Old Ford Lock. The weir is screened off from the main channel by a heavy fence, starting at Lea Bridge and ending with a short section comprising floating buoys, anchored between the end of the fence and the land to the south of the weir. There are four sluices in the main part of the weir, an octagonal turbine house or sluice house at its north end, and an eel pass at its south end.

Beyond the weir, a little way South along the Hackney Cut, Pond Lane footbridge crosses the waterway at the site of the previous Pond Lane Flood Gates. Below the bridge, the towpath is on the east bank of the channel, while above it, the towpath is on the west bank. The bridge has two arches, and boaters should use the western arch. Just upstream of the bridge a bubble barrier crosses the channel at an angle. A stream of bubbles is emitted from a submerged pipe, which funnel floating weeds, debris and litter to a holding area, formed by the bank and the bridge abutments, from where it can be removed. It has reduced the cost of removing litter before it reaches the River Thames and the sea, as well as having a beneficial effect on water quality, without restricting the movement of boats and fish. The bubble barrier was commissioned in May 2020.
