= Lea Bridge =

District of London, England

Coordinates: 51.5621°N 0.0456°W

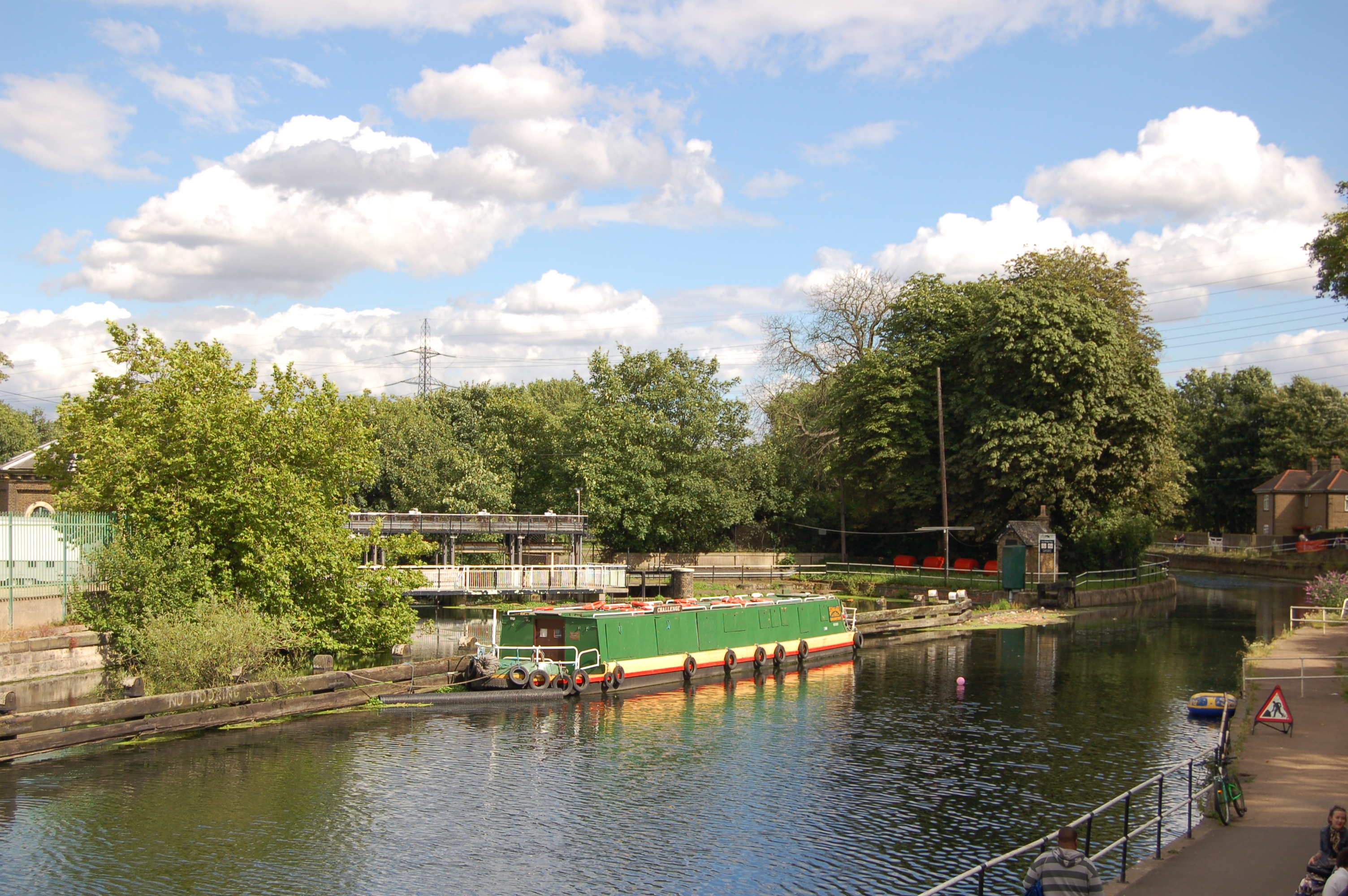
- Below Lea Bridge, the flow of the river continues over the head of the Middlesex Filter Beds Weir. Hackney Cut continues the navigation to the right. The island between contains a nature reserve in the former filter beds.

- Location within Greater London
- Population: 29,710 (Both Lea Bridge wards 2011 Census)
- OS grid reference: TQ355865
  - Charing Cross: 7 mi (11.3 km) SW
- London borough: Hackney; Waltham Forest
- Ceremonial county: Greater London
- Region: London
- Country: England
- Sovereign state: United Kingdom
- Post town: LONDON
- Postcode district: E5, E10
- Dialling code: 020
- Police: Metropolitan
- Fire: London
- Ambulance: London
- UK Parliament: Hackney North and Stoke Newington; Leyton and Wanstead
- London Assembly: North East; North East

Lea Bridge is a district in the London Borough of Hackney and the London Borough of Waltham Forest in London, England. It lies 7 miles (11.3 km) northeast of Charing Cross.

The area it takes its name from a bridge built over the River Lea in either 1745 – or sometime after 1757 – and the Lea Bridge Road which leads through the area and across the bridge. The bridge also gives its name to a ward in Waltham Forest (Lea Bridge) on the eastern, Leyton, bank of the river, and to a ward in Hackney on the Western side of the river, also called Lea Bridge ward. The boundary between the two boroughs runs down the middle of the river at this point.

Within Hackney, Lea Bridge Road forms the customary boundary between Upper and Lower Clapton.

== History ==
Jeremy's Ferry Bridge, River Lee Act 1778
- Act of Parliament
- Parliament of Great Britain
- Long title: An Act to continue and enlarge the Term and Powers of an Act, made in the Thirtieth Year of the Reign of King George the Second, for building a Bridge over the River Lea, at or near a Place called Jeremy's Ferry; and for making, repairing and widening Roads, from thence into the great Roads at Snaresbrook, in the County of Essex, and at Clapton, in the County of Middlesex.
- Citation: 18 Geo. 3. c. 10
- Territorial extent: Great Britain

Dates
- Royal assent: 6 March 1778
- Commencement: 20 November 1777 (Note: Start of session.)
- Repealed: 1 January 1827
Other legislation
Repealed by	Metropolis Roads Act 1826

Status: Repealed

Text of statute as originally enacted

In 1582 Mill Fields Lane ran from Clapton to Jeremy's Ferry in the Leyton Marshes. At the same spot a timber bridge was built in either 1745, or sometime after 1757. After this, the road became known as Lea Bridge Road, with a tollgate at the Clapton end. A toll house was built on the west bank of the river in 1757, and the bridge rebuilt in iron in 1820–1. Tolls continued to be levied until 1872.

Clapton Orient played at the Lea Bridge Stadium between 1930 and 1937 before moving to Brisbane Road. The stadium was also used for speedway and was the home track of the Lea Bridge speedway team. It was demolished in the 1970s and a housing estate built on the site.

== Local area ==
There are few crossing points for the Lea Marshes. The nearest major river crossing to the south is at Hackney Wick and to the north at Tottenham Hale.

The area contains large amounts of open space, dominated by the Millfields recreation grounds, one of the largest parks in Hackney, which in 2023 was awarded the Green Flag Award to mark the high standard of the park environment and its maintenance. Along the southern border of the park sits the former coal-fired Millfields power station, now used as electrical sub-stations on the London Ring, and recently upgraded. This was built in 1901, well before the creation of the National Grid in 1938, a period when power had to be generated near to the consumer. It provided electric street lighting throughout the then Metropolitan Borough of Hackney.

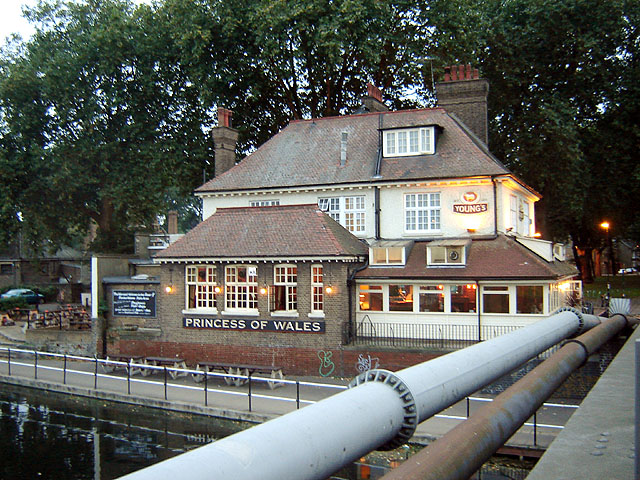
The Princess of Wales pub from Lea Bridge (October 2005)

Lea Bridge gives ready access to the lower reaches of the extensive Lee Valley Park, which stretches for about 42 kilometres (26.1 mi) on both banks of the river. Next to the south side of the bridge is a pub, the "Princess of Wales" and a Grade *II listed Victorian Old Schoolhouse, built in 1841, which provided free education for the children of "transient boatmen and bargees", now flats. To the south are the Hackney Marshes, and beyond Leyton Marsh to the north are the Walthamstow Marshes and Nature Reserve. Also to the south is the Queen Elizabeth Olympic Park, site of the 2012 Olympic Games.

Below the bridge, the river flows over the Middlesex Filter Beds Weir, marking the boundary with Leyton and providing the supply for the former East London Waterworks Company. The old Middlesex Filter Beds have been converted into a nature reserve, and on the Leyton side the corresponding Essex Filter Beds are now a reserve for birds. The Lee Navigation continues south in an artificial channel known as 'Hackney Cut', to the next lock at Old Ford (about 1.7 miles), where the natural channel rejoins the Navigation after its 2 miles (3.2 km) meander towards Leyton.

To the North of the river is an ice rink, which got a planning application granted (in October 2020) to demolish and replace with a double pad ice rink and other leisure facilities. There is also Oxbow Island, created by the meandering of the river, along the north bank, which is one of the remaining areas of wild land and wildlife in the area and is the responsibility of the Canal & River Trust.

== Transport ==
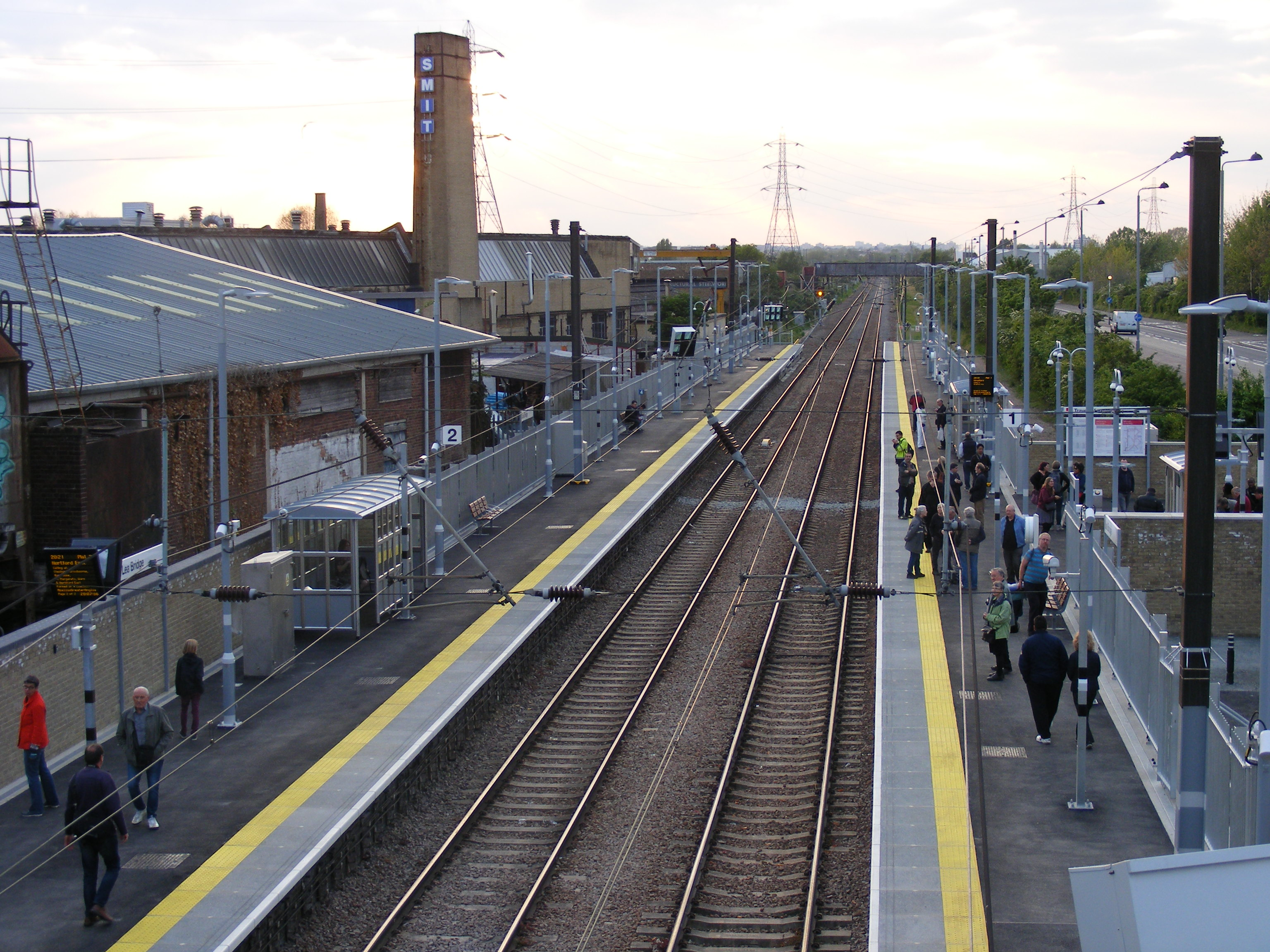
Lea Bridge Railway Station when it reopened in 2016.

The local station for Lea Bridge is Lea Bridge railway station on the Lea Valley lines. Also close by is Clapton railway station on the Liverpool Street to Chingford line. Lea Bridge Road is well served by buses having seven bus routes in total, two of which are night routes, and one 24-hour route. Buses in the area include routes 55, 56, 58 and W19, with the addition of night routes N38, N55 and 24-hour operated route 158. More recently, there is now a 308 bus which comes from Lea Bridge roundabout and turns into Chatsworth Road, going to Stratford.

From Lea Bridge roundabout intersection with Upper and Lower Clapton roads, a number of buses travel south through Hackney, and to the city, and to the north through Stamford Hill and Stoke Newington.
