= Old Ford =

Coordinates: 51.535°N 0.022°W

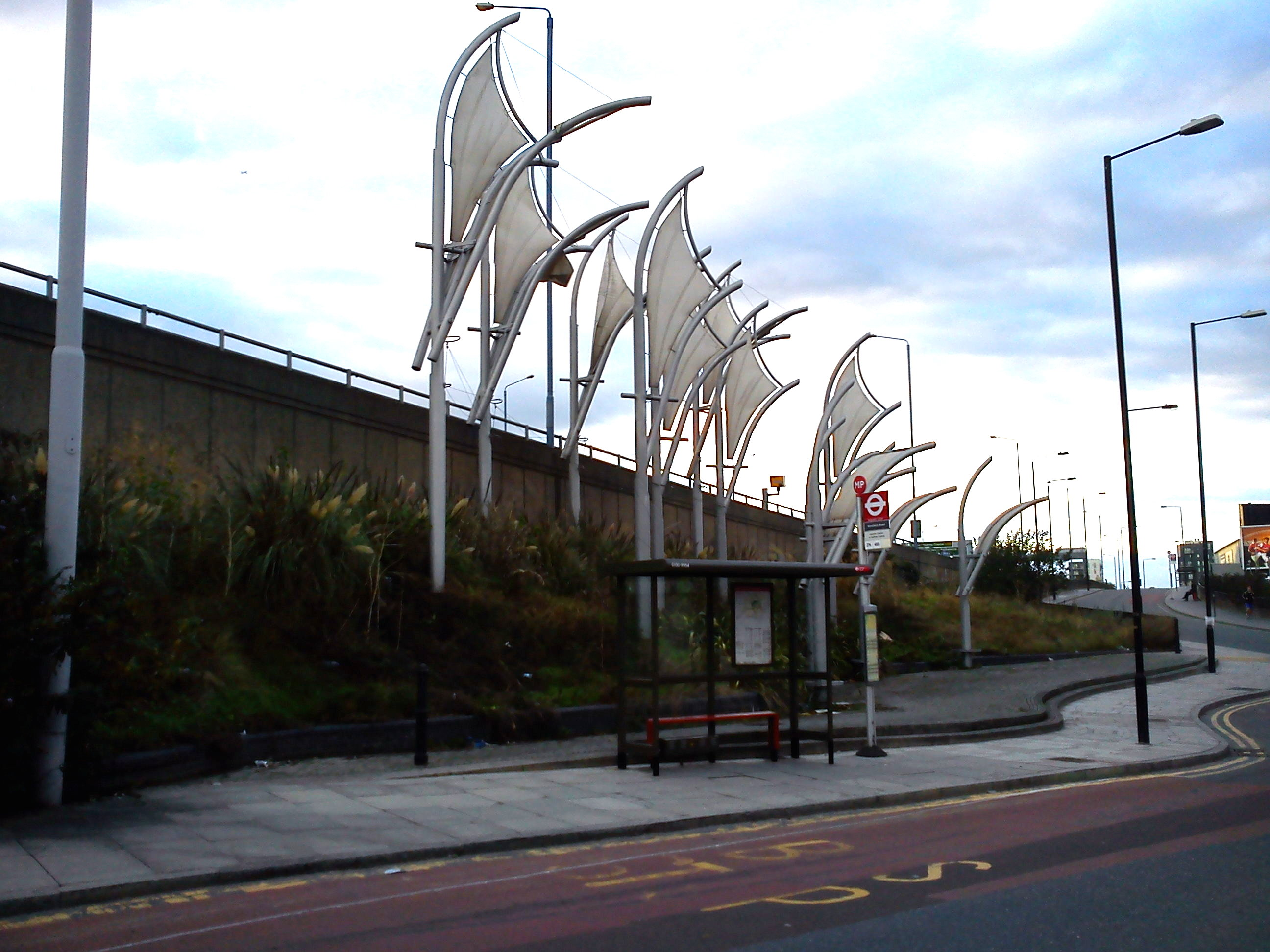
- Sculptures in Old Ford

- Location within Greater London
- OS grid reference: TQ365835
- London borough: Tower Hamlets
- Ceremonial county: Greater London
- Region: London
- Country: England
- Sovereign state: United Kingdom
- Post town: LONDON
- Postcode district: E3
- Dialling code: 020
- Police: Metropolitan
- Fire: London
- Ambulance: London
- UK Parliament: Stratford and Bow
- London Assembly: City and East

Old Ford is an area in the London Borough of Tower Hamlets that is named after the natural ford which provided a crossing of the River Lea.

== History ==
=== Roman river crossing at Old Ford ===
A series of roads developed out from Londinium between 43CE and 68CE, with Ivan Margary's Roman road RR3 leaving the north-east corner of the capital through the Roman gate at Aldgate, then following the line of what is now Whitechapel Road, through Old Ford, Stratford, Ilford and Romford to Camulodunum (Colchester) and Venta Icenorum (Norwich), being recorded by the Romans as Iter IX in the Antonine Itinerary.

Further Roman road construction was undertaken by the Roman legions and a Roman road was constructed from Old Ford through Wanstead and on to Chigwell (Roman town name unknown), going on to connect London to Great Dunmow and at its northernmost point, itself situated on Stane Street. This formed a connection between two Roman roads (RR30 & RR32), with RR32 running west from Camulodunum to Braughing (Roman name unknown - near Ware, Hertfordshire) and facilitating access to central southern Britain from Camulodonum to support military activity and later trade.

Old Ford was key to the Roman road system in England east of the River Lea. “The river was, at that time, tidal up to one mile above the Ford. Even today, the Spring tides sweep up the river from the Thames and inundate the towpaths and low-lying ground in the locality. In this way, even before Roman Invasion of A.D. 43, Old Ford was probably well established as some kind of settlement. ... Recent finds, including a section of Roman Highway at Lefevre Road, about four hundred yards west of the site of the Ford, provides ample evidence that the Romans occupied the district. ... The Ford across the river was sited at the end of a short access road ‘un-named’, which is situated on the bend of Old Ford Road about 30 yards north of Iceland Road. ... The most persistent clue is the access roadway already mentioned. It is shown on Gascoigne’s Survey of 1703/4 and again on John Rocque’s Survey of 1740, although slightly mis-aligned on the latter map. This seemingly useless piece of highway still exists today and is shown on modern maps. It now serves as a car park to neighbouring business concerns. A line from this piece of roadway across the Roman Highway at Lefevre Road gives a reasonable alignment to Aldgate, the probable Roman Route. ... In Roman times it is quite clear that at least one road of importance provided access to it out of the City Of London. ... The stretch of roadway between Lefevre Road and St. Stephen’s Road almost exactly coincides with the suggested Roman Aldgate’s alignment, and quite by chance sits on the Roman foundations for part of its length.”

=== Old Ford ancient Romano-British burials ===
A 1973 report on an archaeological dig of ancient Roman burials, at Old Ford E3, by William J. Owen, Irene Schwab and Harvey Sheldon [], includes as an appendix the summary of all previous Romano-British burial finds, along with the finds from 1972:

1844 – funerary urns containing burnt bones, centre of Old Ford Road on the east corner of Wick Lane

1865 – stone coffin with skeleton, Mr Hemmings’ Iron Church and House Works

1865 – stone coffin with adult male skeleton, Saxon Road and New Coborne Road

1868 – two stone coffins with 3 females and 1 male, amphora with bones, Morville Street

1870 - stone coffin with skeleton, end of the platform at Old Ford Road Station

1870 – stone coffin with adult male skeleton, sixty yards south of Roman Road

1910 – stone coffin in the middle of Saxon Road, Collingwood Estate, and stone coffin on the site of the Carlisle Tavern, Lacey Street, as recalled by old railwaymen to Reginald Smith

1969 – cremation, Lefevre Road development, discovered by John Laing workers

1969 – stone coffin with skeleton, opposite 85 Parnell Road, E3

1970 – wooden coffin burial, Parnell Road, E3

1972 – stone coffin with adult female skeleton, opposite 114 Armagh Road, E3

1972 – stone coffin with adult male and female skeletons, McInerney’s Beale Road development.

=== Other local finds ===
‘In an earlier description of one of the burials Roach Smith noted that it had been found “contiguous to fields and gardens in which Roman urns have occasionally been found and Roman coins in great abundance’. He also recorded that ‘the tenant of one of the gardens . . . told us that he had dug within the last few years, at least 500 Roman coins”.’

Clearly there was a lot of activity in the Old Ford area during the Roman period. The area seems to have been largely agricultural prior to the 19th century and if the report is accurate, it might refer to what once was a hoard of coins, perhaps disturbed and then redistributed through ploughing.

=== Administration and boundaries ===
Historically, Old Ford was a cluster of houses and a mill, around the ford. It formed a part of the Ancient Parish of Stepney. Together with the rest of Bow, it separated from Stepney to become a (late formed) Ancient Parish of Bow in 1719. Ancient Parishes were, until the 19th century responsible for both civil and ecclesiastical local administration, after that there were divergent civil and ecclesiastical parish areas.

It expanded rapidly in the Victorian era into an outer suburb of London and was designated an independent Anglican parish in the mid-Victorian period, although civil administration has always been associated with Bow.

=== Location of the ford ===
Victorian OS maps and other sources show an illustrative location of the, by then, former ford, at Iceland Wharf which was just to the south of the bridge which carries the Northern Outfall Sewer and Greenway Footpath over the Lea, and also immediately south of the confluence of the Lea and the Hackney Brook.

The confluence is likely to have caused the Lea to eddy and slow, causing much alluvial material from both watercourses to be dropped at this point, which may have been the reason that fording the river was possible here. This may have been reinforced by the fact that the Lea's tidal head was in the vicinity.

Excavations have shown that in the Roman period, the ford lay a very short distance to the north of this point, immediately north of the Northern Outfall Sewer. The Romans dumped materials to improve the ford and at one time appear to have had a bridge over the Lea.

Evidence has been found of a late Roman settlement at Old Ford dating from the 4th and 5th centuries. Excavations in 2002–03 discovered a substantial 'ribbon' development along the line of the road, surrounded by fields. Near the river there was evidence for a cluster of wooden buildings dominated by a large open-ended barn. Large amounts of cattle bone were also discovered, suggesting butchery to supply the London market. The Lea was thought to be used to supply Roman London with agricultural products and pottery from Hertfordshire and the north. Old Ford was where the goods were transferred to continue their journey into London by wagon.

=== Routes using the ford ===
Old Ford, as the name suggests, was the ancient most downstream crossing point of the then unchannelised River Lea. At this time the Lea was a wide fast-flowing river and the tidal estuary stretched as far as Hackney Wick.

Two routes may have used the ford, both continuing through Essex and including Colchester amongst their destinations. Colchester was where the Romans set up their initial capital for their occupation, and the road was upgraded to run from the area of London Bridge as one of the first paved Roman roads in Britain.

The routes using the ford were:

- A pre-Roman route that followed the modern Oxford Street and Old Street, through Bethnal Green to Old Ford and thence across a causeway through the marshes known as Wanstead Slip (now transferred to Leyton).
- The Roman Road that emerged from London's Wall at Aldgate and went via Stratford and Chelmsford to Colchester and beyond. Beyond the M25, much of this route is now known as the A12.

=== After the bridge ===
In 1110, Matilda, wife of Henry I, reputedly fell into the water at the ford on her way to Barking Abbey and ordered a distinctively bow-shaped three-arched bridge to be built over the River Lea.

The building of the bridge at Bow did not leave Old Ford as a backwater and the ford continued to be well used, but it was in an isolated and rural area and the local population centre moved to Bow in the Middle Ages. Old Ford was the site of one of the many watermills in the area that supplied flour to the bakers of Stratforde-atte-Bow, and hence bread to the city. Due to their isolation, residents were given dispensation to worship in the chapel of ease at Stratforde-atte-Bow, later Bow Church, to save the often difficult journey to the parish church of St Dunstan's at Stepney.

A lock and weir now exist on the Lee Navigation near where the ford used to be. This lies at the end of 'Hackney Cut', an 18th-century artificial channel, and the natural channel (known as the Waterworks River) rejoins the channel below the lock.

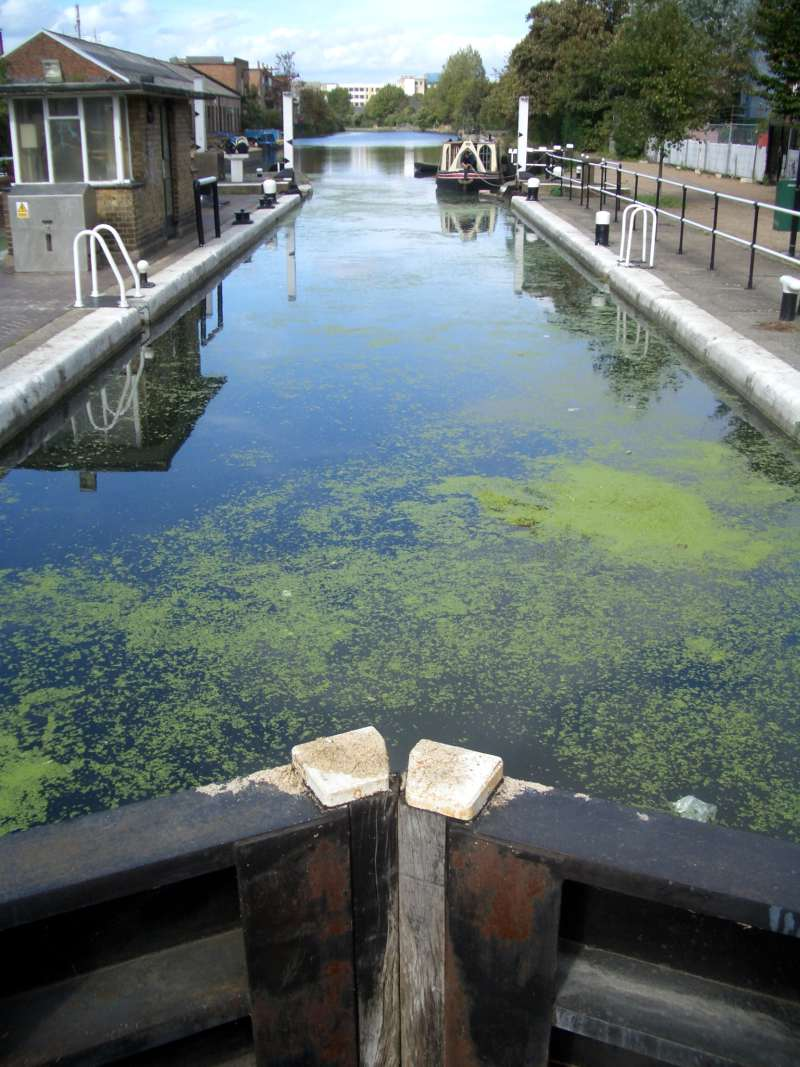
Old Ford Lock, Lee Navigation

n June 1648, during the Wars of the Three Kingdoms, a Royalist force of some 500 to 600 men won a minor battle against the Tower Hamlets Militia at Bow Bridge and occupied Stratford for three days, before heading off along the old Roman Road to the Siege of Colchester. During that those three days they carefully guarded Bow Bridge and a number of local fords so that the Lea would secure their flank against attack from the City of London and the Tower Hamlets.

=== From settlement to district ===
Farming and market gardening prevailed in the settlement until the 19th century when Old Ford became a part of the seamless London conurbation as a district, with large estates of relatively poor houses and much poverty. These were built to serve the new factories on the Lea and Lee Navigation and to serve the new railways.

In 1865, a 30-acre plot was purchased to be used as a gasworks, but the Gas Light and Coke Company established what would become known as Fish Island, giving it its distinctive road names, and building a mixed residential and industrial development instead.

The North London Railway had a line through the area with a station at Old Ford railway station. The line was badly damaged during World War II and never reopened. The station buildings were demolished in the early 1960s.

=== Reconstruction ===
As part of the post-war rebuilding, the Lakeview Estate was built and designed by Berthold Lubetkin, on a site damaged by bombing in World War II, on Grove Road between Old Ford Road and the Hertford Union Canal. The estate opened in 1958.

Fish Island also saw significant bombing during the war, with damaged housing demolished post-war to make way for factories and warehouses.

St Barnabas's, Bethnal Green was also badly damaged by bombing during the same World War; the steeple was removed and the church rebuilt, retaining the tower and north and south walls. The remodelling was carried out by J Anthony Lewis of architects Michael Tapper & Lewis, who commissioned the sculptor Don Potter to create The Four Evangelists on the outside of the building.

Victoria Park became known for its open air music festivals, often linked with a political cause in the 1970/80s. In 1978, Rock Against Racism organised a protest event against growth of far-right organisations such as the National Front. The concert was played by The Clash, Steel Pulse, X-Ray Spex, The Ruts, Sham 69, Generation X, and the Tom Robinson Band. In 1975, the Baroness Burdett Coutts Drinking Fountain in the park was given Grade II* listed status by Historic England.

=== Contemporary ===
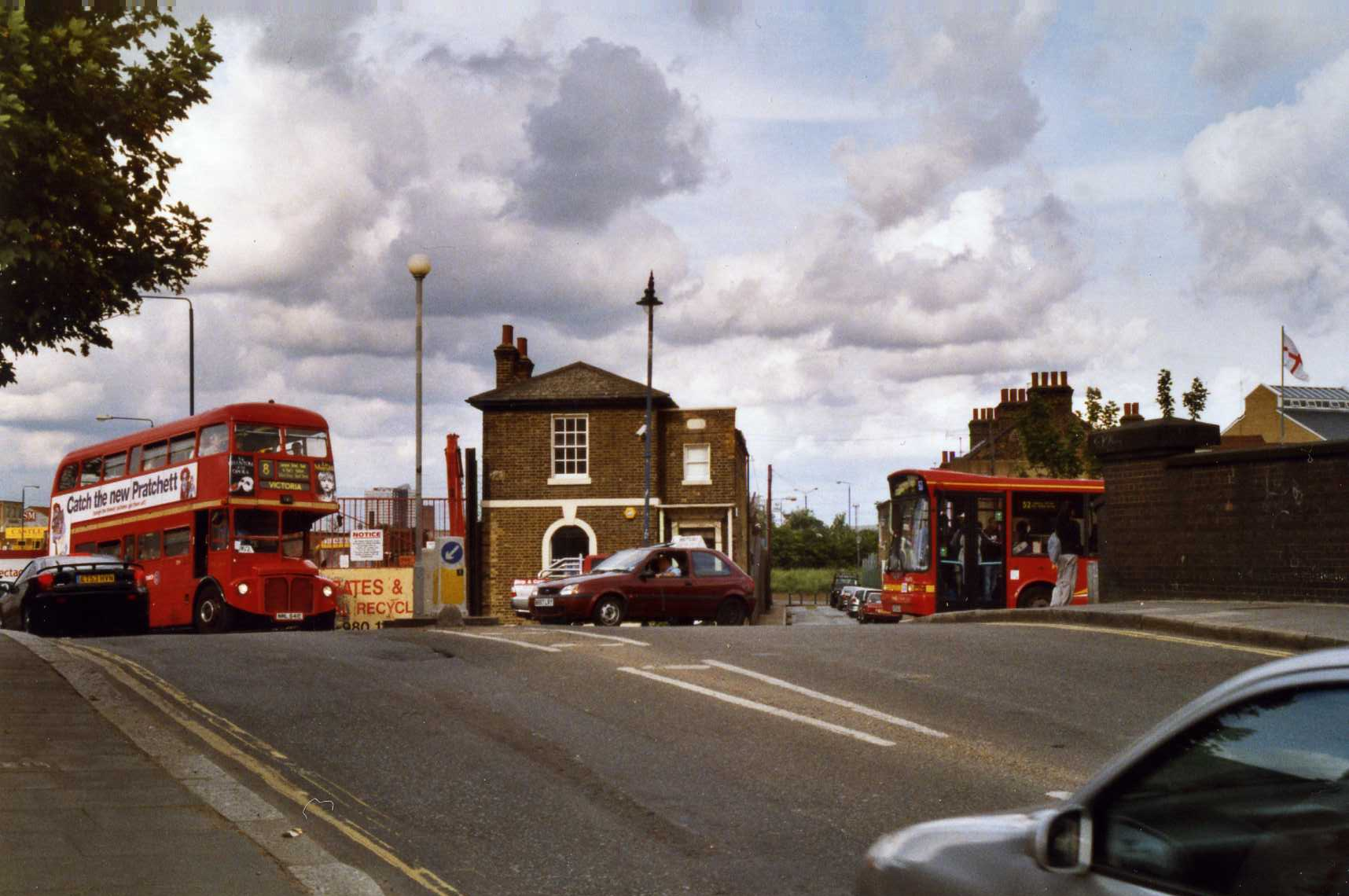
Last day of the Routemaster, 4 June 2004

In 1986 the Greater London Council transferred responsibility for the park to the London borough of Tower Hamlets and the London Borough of Hackney, through a joint management board. Since 1994 Tower Hamlets has run the park alone.

In 1991, St Paul's, Old Ford was closed due to maintenance and safety concerns. The Parochial Church Council and local people were determined to see that the church remained open and, in fact, was improved. The "A New Heart for Bow" project was born. More than £3,000,000 was raised from more than a dozen sources and philanthropies. Matthew Lloyd Architects was appointed to refurbish the building and enable it to serve the wider community as well as the church. Work began in March 2003 and ended over a year later, in May 2004.

St Barnabas Community Fete, also known as Bowstock, was an annual fête and music festival held on Wennington Green in Mile End Park.

Fish Island has a long history as a home to artists and art spaces, having one of the highest densities of fine artists, designers and artisans in Europe according to a 2009 study which found around 600 artists' studios. The Percy Dalton Peanut Factory was at Fish Island, occupying Britannia Works and gatehouse along Dace Road, and another building on Smeed Road. Britannia Works has been run as an artists studio building by SPACE since 2000. Channel 4’s The Big Breakfast was broadcast live from a former lockkeeper's cottages on Fish Island, from 28 September 1992 until 29 March 2002.

The Palm Tree is a public house which was Grade II listed in 2015 by Historic England.

== Geography ==
The Bow Wharf is the point where the Regent's Canal meets the Hertford Union Canal at the Hertford Union Junction between Mile End Lock and Old Ford Lock on the Regent's Canal.

== Community ==
Local council facilities are grouped around Roman Road market. The local library, now called an Idea Store, is situated in Gladstone Place. A community and tenants' hall is nearby. Access to council services is dealt with by the Bow and North Poplar One Stop Shop in Ewart Place.

The Percy Dalton Peanut Factory was at Fish Island, occupying Britannia Works and gatehouse along Dace Road, and another building on Smeed Road. Britannia Works has been run as an artists studio building by SPACE since 2000, who led a set of community programs.

The oldest model boat club in the world, the Victoria Model Steam Boat Club, founded in Victoria Park on 15 July 1904, is still active today and holds up to 17 of their Sunday regattas a year. The VMSB Club runs straight-running boats just as they did 100 years ago but have also progressed to radio controlled boats and hydroplanes. The first Regatta is traditionally held on Easter Sunday and the Steam Regatta is always held on the first Sunday in July.

== Transport ==
Old Ford is served by bus route 8 to Tottenham Court Road station and Bow Church as well as a number of local bus routes 276, 339 and 488. It is also linked to the London Night Bus network by the N8.

Old Ford has no access to the London Underground network, but was formerly connected to the British rail network at Old Ford railway station on the North London Railway and at Coborn Road on the Great Eastern Main Line.

Old Ford is connected to the National Road Network via Parnell Road and Tredegar Road to the A12 (East Cross Route) running north/north east-south.

Access to the Hertford Union Canal is via the tow-path (which the National Cycle Route 1 also passes along) from Wick Road at St Marks Gate (Victoria Park). East leads to the Lee Navigation where proceeding north leads to Hackney Marshes. Turning south along the Lea leads through Bow Locks, into Bow Creek and thence to the River Thames, but the tow-path can often be blocked. West from Wick Road leads to the Hertford Union junction where the canal joins the Regent's Canal, near Mile End. There is a footbridge over the East Cross Route linking Fish Island.

== See also ==
- A number of artificial waterways cross the district. Old Ford Lock could refer to:
  - On the Lee Navigation, to the east of the district
    - Old Ford Lock
  - On the Regent's Canal, to the west of Victoria Park
    - Old Ford Lock
  - On the Hertford Union Canal, to the south of Victoria Park
    - Old Ford Three Locks
- East London Waterworks Company
