= Hackney Marshes =

Open space in London

Coordinates: 51.557°N 0.030°W

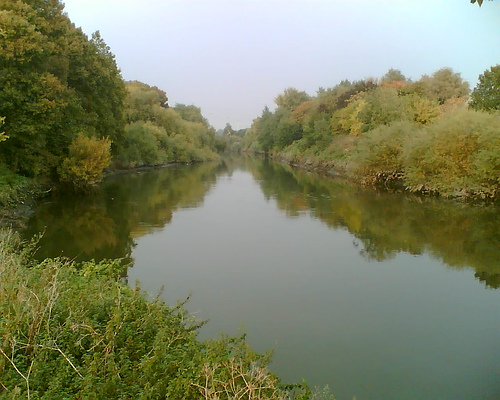
- The River Lea passing through Hackney Marshes

- Location within Greater London
- OS grid reference: TQ375845
  - Charing Cross: 6 mi (9.7 km) SW
- London borough: Hackney
- Ceremonial county: Greater London
- Region: London
- Country: England
- Sovereign state: United Kingdom
- Post town: LONDON
- Postcode district: E9, E10
- Dialling code: 020
- Police: Metropolitan
- Fire: London
- Ambulance: London
- UK Parliament: Hackney South and Shoreditch
- London Assembly: North East

Hackney Marshes is an area of open space in London's Lower Lea Valley, lying on the western bank of the River Lea. It takes its name from its position on the eastern boundary of Hackney, the principal part of the London Borough of Hackney, and from its origin as an area of true marsh.

The marshes were extensively drained from medieval times onwards, and rubble was dumped here from buildings damaged by air raids during World War II, raising the level of the ground.

The principal area of the marsh lies below Lea Bridge Road between the Old River Lea, and the Hackney Cut – an artificial channel of the Lee Navigation, dug about 1770, to avoid a loop in the natural watercourse. The southern extent is marked by the A12; although the industrial land around Hackney Wick Stadium was originally an extension of the marsh, it now forms a part of the Olympic Park for the 2012 Summer Olympics.

Hackney Marsh is one of the largest areas of common land in Greater London, with 136.01 hectares (336.1 acres) of protected commons.

== History ==
=== The marsh ===
The river itself was always an important waterway, being navigable to Hertfordshire; the Marsh was formed by the periodic flooding of the river, and so formed useful pasture, but could not be occupied permanently. Before the 10th century, the estuary of the river came as far as Hackney Wick, crossed at Old Ford. Marsh Road, the continuation of Homerton High Street, led to the marshes, and thence to Temple Mills. The Romans appear to have built a significant stone causeway across the marshes here; a periodical, the Ambulator of 1774, noted

there have been discovered within the last few years the remains of a great causeway of stone, which, by the Roman coins found there, would appear to have been one of the famous highways made by the Romans

The river forms a natural boundary, so in 527 AD it formed the boundary between the Saxon kingdoms of Essex and Middlesex. In the 9th century, it formed a part of the Danelaw boundary and reputedly, King Alfred stranded an invading Viking fleet here in 895 AD. This was achieved by draining the river where it met the River Thames, but the increased drainage affected river navigability, until it was restored in the 17th century.

By medieval times, both sides had become counties in England, and attempts were made to control the flow of water through the marshes. Mills were established including the Knights Templar mill at Temple Mills. Much of the marsh was 'owned' by the Templars and used for pasture. When the Templars were abolished, the land passed to the Knights Hospitaller, and thence to the Crown during the Reformation, when monastic lands were seized. At this time, much of the land was associated with the Hackney village of Lower Homerton and with the large manor house at Hackney Wick.

Around 1770, the river was straightened by the construction of the Hackney Cut, now forming the western extent of the marsh. The natural watercourse passes to the east over the Middlesex Filter Beds Weir, just below Lea Bridge Road. A nature reserve occupies the former Middlesex Filter beds on the island between the two watercourses.

By 1795, the former Templar mills were being used for preparing lead (submerged in urine, and heated by decaying cow dung, the lead was converted to lead oxide, and then finely ground to form a pigment for white, yellow and red lead paint). A new watermill was established on the Crown land of the marshes by Prince Rupert for an improved method of boring guns, however the secret died with him in 1682 and the enterprise collapsed.

At the end of the 19th century Hackney suffered from increased demand for building land, both for housing and to extend the factories in Homerton. The marshes had always suffered periodic flooding from the Lea but with the introduction of mains sewerage a flood relief sewer was constructed beneath the marshes. Most common and Lammas lands were then preserved by an Act of Parliament and passed to the control of the Metropolitan Board of Works, but the marsh remained excluded from the MBW scheme because many of the lammas rights were still exercised, predominantly grazing. This was a period of increasing arguments between landowners and groups, such as the Eton Manor Mission, who were trying to use the marsh for recreation. The 337 acres (1.36 km^{2}) of marshes were finally preserved by the London County Council in 1890, by purchasing the rights and landowners' interests for £75,000. They opened to the public in 1893 by the Chairman of the LCC, Sir John Hutton and were formally dedicated in 1894. The LCC undertook further flood prevention, straightening some of the bends in the River by introducing four 'cuts', the old channels being retained to form islands.

There were few houses on the marshes, but a notable exception was the White House Inn, by a bridge on the old road to Leyton. Originally built as part of a Lea fishery scheme, the pub is now long gone but a bridge remains, rebuilt to supply anti-aircraft batteries during World War II.

In the Marshes towards Hackney Wick were low public houses, the haunt of highwaymen and their Dulcineas. Dick Turpin was a constant guest at the "White House," or "Tyler's Ferry," near Joe Sowter's cock-pit at Temple Mills; and few police-officers were bold enough to approach the spot.

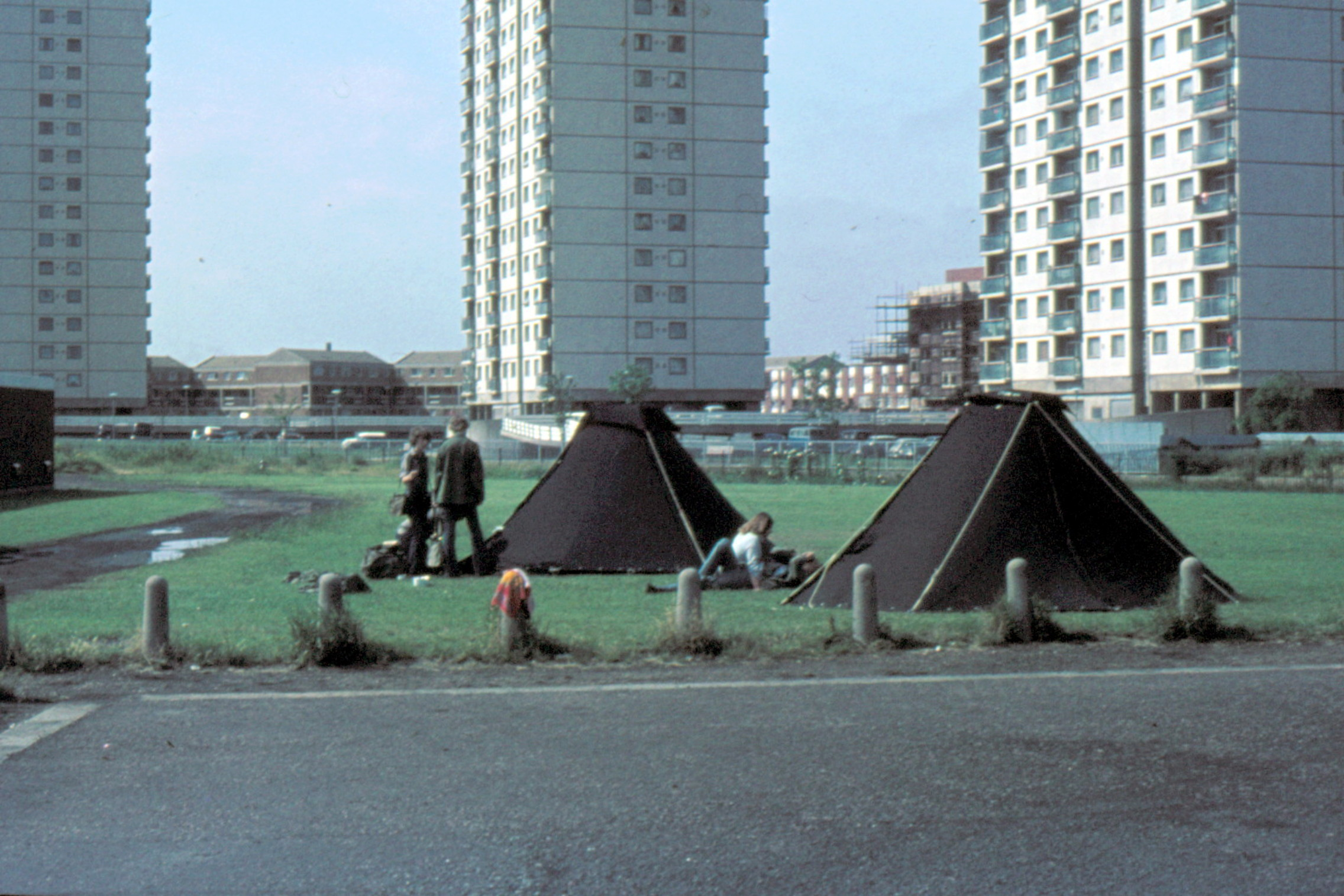
Camping on Hackney Marshes, 1970s

Small areas of the marsh have been taken for housing and sports fields and others added. 35.5 acres (144,000 m^{2}) were taken in 1915 to build the 'National Projectile Factory'; after World War I, in 1922 this site was used to create the Mabley Green recreation ground. A further 22.5 acres (91,000 m^{2}) were taken in 1937 for the building of the Kingsmead Estate. Hackney Power Station was situated to the north west of the marshes, across the Lee Navigation, and operated between 1901 and 1976.

Between the 1970s and 1990s, a camping site was situated at the north end of the Marshes, adjacent to Cow Bridge, at one point branded as Tent City.

The Lesney die cast model factory was built on the Homerton side of the Lee Navigation in the 1940s, having success for many years with their Matchbox brand. The factory was a major local employer and closed in 1990.

=== Sport ===
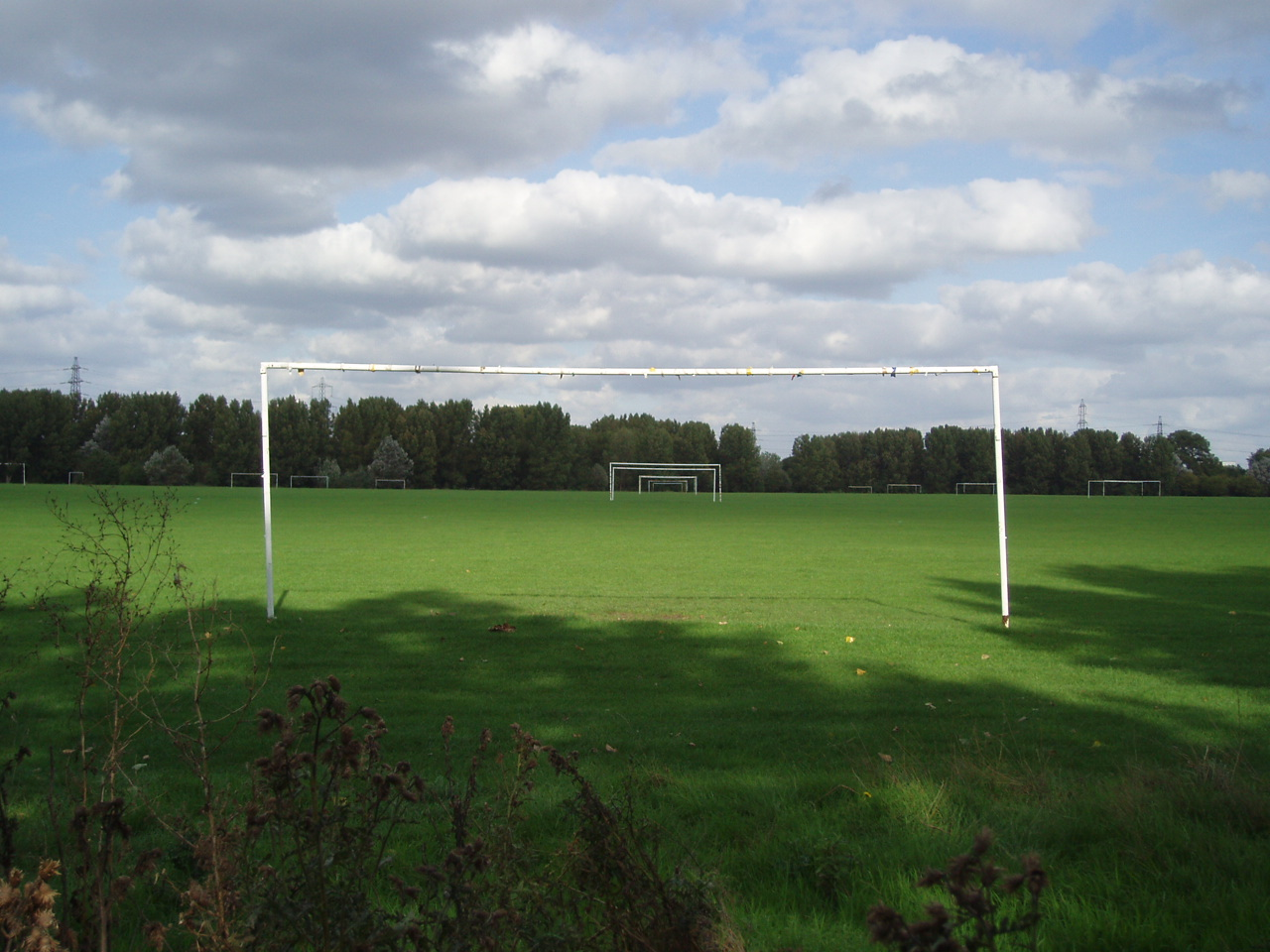
Hackney Marshes football pitches

In 1881, men from Homerton College, then still in the London area, founded the Glyn Cricket Club. Members of the cricket club then decided to form a football section to keep fit during the winter months, this football section was to become the famous Clapton Orient Football Club which for thirty years played its home games at Millfields Road Stadium (1900–1930). In 1946 the Club was renamed Leyton Orient and their home ground is now the Matchroom Stadium in Brisbane Road, Leyton, E10 5NF.

Today there are many walks through the marshes in reach of the inner city, but the most famous use of Hackney Marshes is for Sunday league football, with 88 full-size football pitches marked out. On a typical Sunday, over 100 matches are played by teams in several local leagues, such as the Hackney and Leyton Sunday League and the Camden Sunday League.

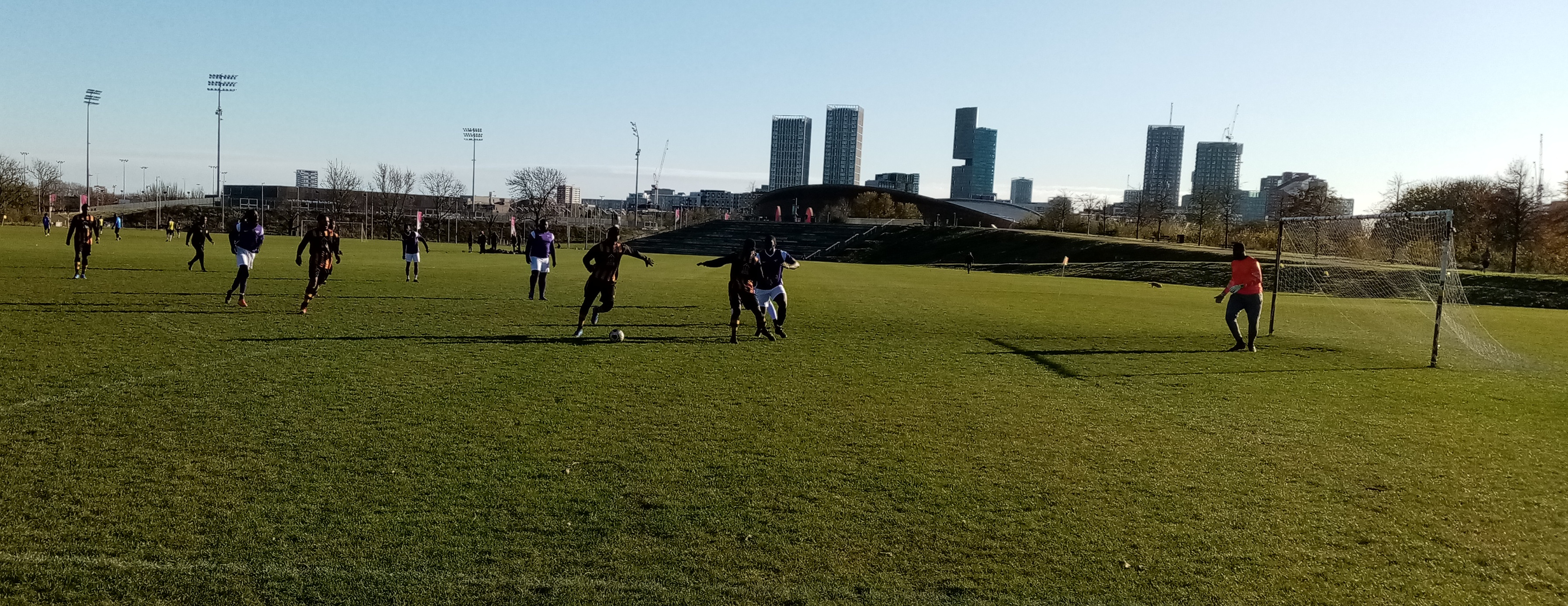
Football league match in 2021.

In 2006 there was a dispute between the London Borough of Hackney and Nike, Inc. over the company's use of the borough logo on their sportswear. The dispute was settled with payment of £300,000 going to support local youth sports groups.

The annual Hackney Half marathon, taking place in May, starts and finishes at the marshes.

=== London Olympics 2012 ===
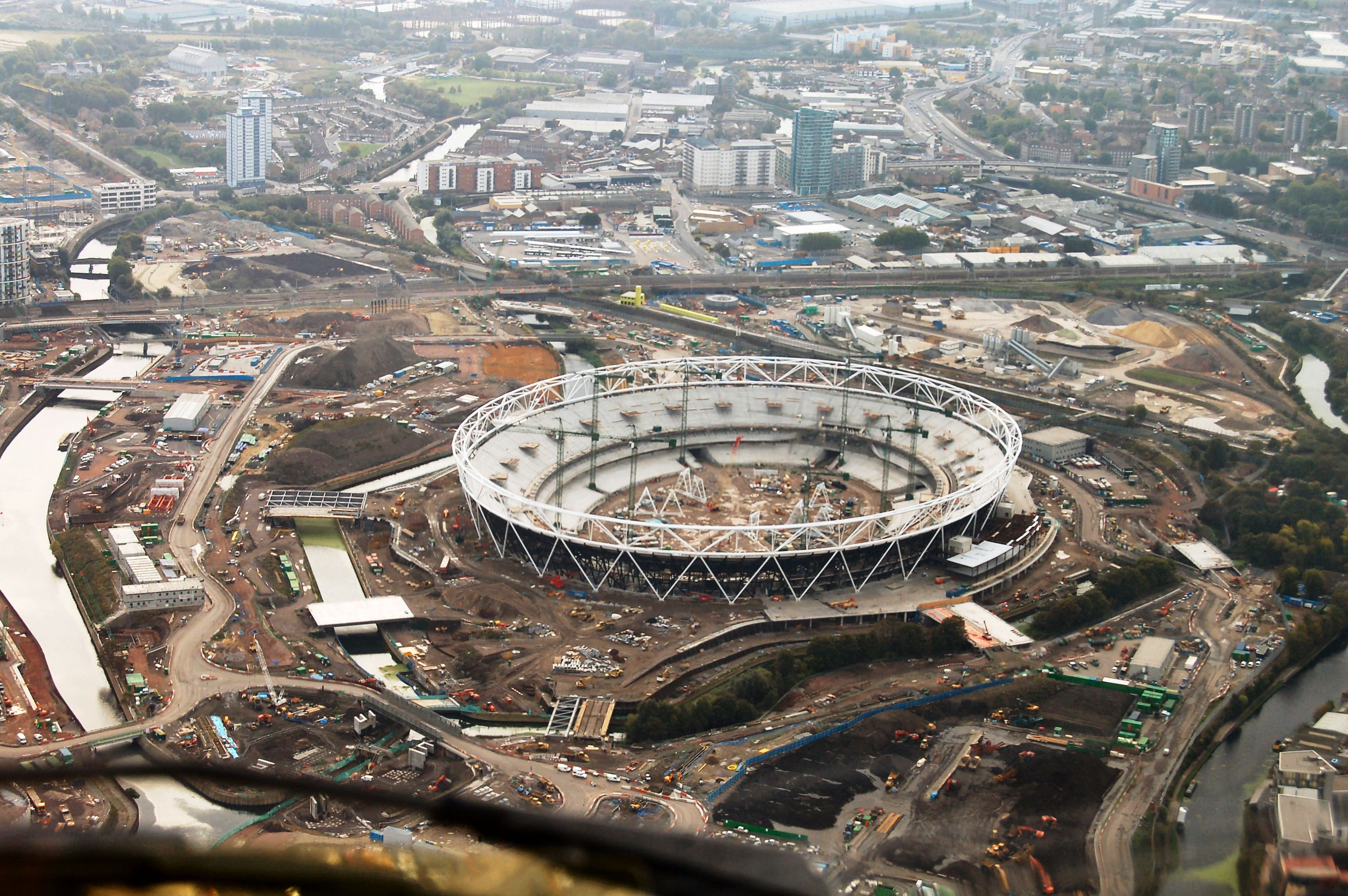
The 2012 Summer Olympics stadium under construction.

Part of the London Olympic park for the Summer Olympics of 2012 was built on Hackney Marshes. This caused some controversy with local residents' groups, who expressed concerns that East Marsh was to be tarmacked and used as a disabled coach park for the games. This was a temporary measure.

Arena Fields, however, was lost to the Olympic Park and its site will become part of the legacy Queen Elizabeth Olympic Park permanently. This area is to be replaced by parkland of comparable size and value on the Hackney side at the end of the 2012 Summer Olympics. It will not be possible to reinstate the loss of mature and varied trees or to compensate for the disruption caused to wildlife by construction.

The natural course of the River Lea forms the borough boundary with Waltham Forest and Newham (except for East Marsh, which lies between the river and Temple Mills). The Olympic plans included upgrading this watercourse and improving public access. The Olympic Park lies south of the A12, on industrial land around the former Hackney Stadium.

== Music, literature and film ==
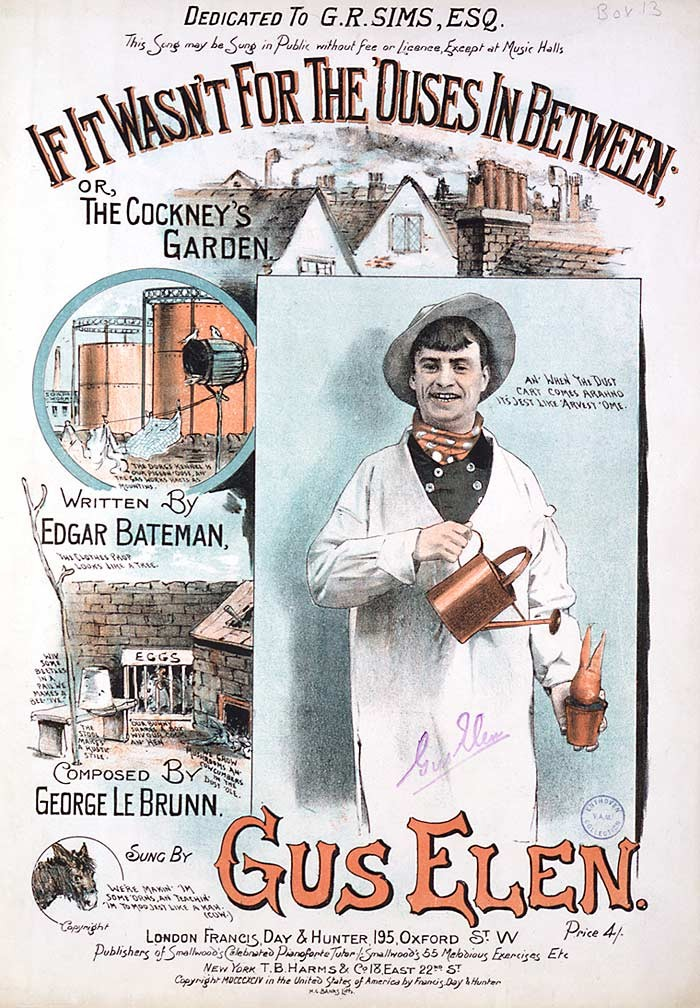
The sheet music of If it wasn't for the 'ouses in between

- Alexander Baron wrote a celebrated novel The Lowlife, published in 1963. The book takes place primarily in the Hackney area and loosely depicts Baron's childhood.
- The celebrated Cockney music hall performer Gus Elen sang a song entitled If It Wasn't for the 'Ouses In Between which included the following chorus:

Oh it really is a wery pretty garden
And Chingford to the eastward could be seen;
'Wiv a ladder and some glasses,
You could see to 'Ackney Marshes,
If it wasn't for the 'ouses in between.

- An experimental 15-minute film Hackney Marshes November 4th 1977 by John Smith was shot on the marshes. It was adapted for television the following year.
- In 1997, Nike presented a selection of Premiership players turning out for the Sunday League teams to the soundtrack of Blur's "Parklife".
- The 2005 film Bullet Boy (Saul Dibb) used the marshes and local streets as a location.
- Radio 1's Hackney Weekend was held here on the marshes on 23 and 24 June 2012. with acts such as Jay-Z, Rihanna, Nicki Minaj, will.i.am, Florence + The Machine, Leona Lewis and Plan B all performing across the two days.

== Transport and locale ==
=== Railway stations ===
The area is not well served by public rail transport, although has many bus services. Access to the Olympic Park is served by Stratford.

Lea Bridge station is the closest rail station to the Marshes. It is one stop away from Stratford.

The nearest London Overground station are Hackney Wick and Homerton, which are about a twenty-minute walk away. At about thirty minutes walking time, the nearest London Underground stations are Leyton and Stratford. Stratford International is also a Eurostar and National Rail station. (International trains are not currently stopping here).

=== Walking and cycling ===
Nearby, Hackney Wick is on the Capital Ring walking route, much of which is accessible to cyclists. The River Lea and local canals have a tow path which is accessible for both walking and cycling. The River Lea provides a continuous route to Hertfordshire and Bedfordshire via the Lea Valley Path for the particularly determined.

Leyton Marsh and the Walthamstow Marshes SSSI are located to the north of Hackney Marshes, and are part of the Lee Valley Regional Park.

== See also ==
- Lower Lea Valley
- Walthamstow Marshes
- Walthamstow Wetlands
- Hackney & Leyton Sunday Football League
