= The Big Breakfast =

British entertainment TV series (1992–2002, 2021–2022)

Coordinates: 51.5383°N 0.0205°W

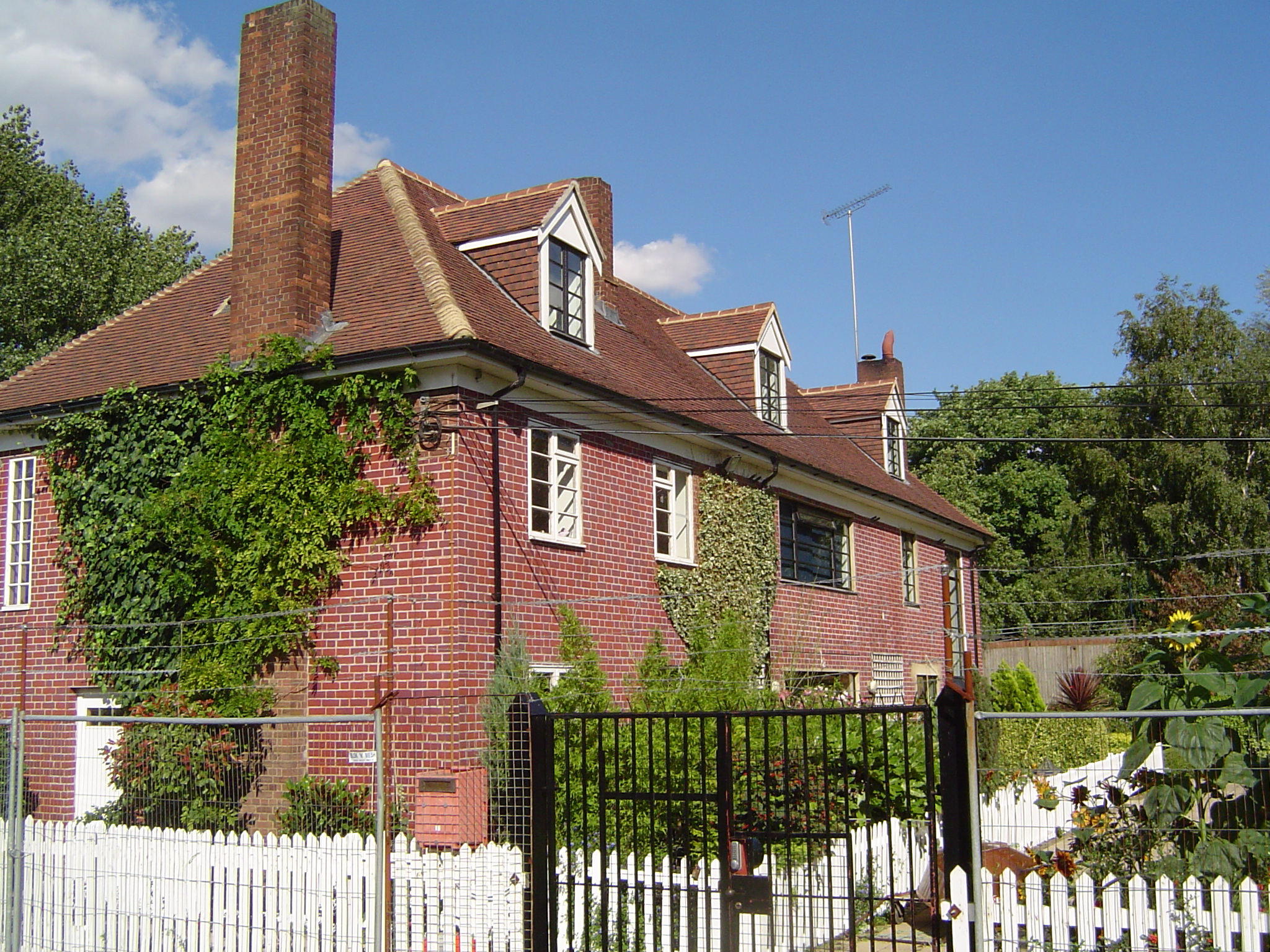
- Lock-keeper's cottages, in Old Ford Lock, Bow, Tower Hamlets used as the studio for The Big Breakfast
- Created by: Charlie Parsons
- Presented by: Various
- Country of origin: United Kingdom
- Original language: English
- No. of episodes: 2,486

Production
- Running time: 120 minutes (Original series); 150 minutes (Revival); 300 minutes (The Bigger Breakfast); 510 minutes (The Biggest Breakfast Ever)
- Production companies: Planet 24 (1992–2002); Lifted Entertainment (2021–2022)

Original release
- Network: Channel 4
- Release: 28 September 1992 – 29 March 2002
- Release: 10 September 2021 – 3 September 2022

The Big Breakfast is a British breakfast light entertainment television programme that was broadcast on Channel 4 from 1992 to 2002, and as a revival from 2021 to 2022. The show had various presenters, starting with Chris Evans and Gaby Roslin at launch with the revival episodes presented by Mo Gilligan and AJ Odudu.

The programme was distinctive for broadcasting live from a real house (which had been lock-keepers' cottages), commonly referred to as "The Big Breakfast House", or more simply, "The House", located on Fish Island, in Bow in east London. The original house on Fish Island in Bow has since been sold.

The show was a mix of news, weather, interviews, audience phone-ins and general features, with a light tone which was in competition with the maturer GMTV and BBC Breakfast programmes.

== History ==
The Big Breakfast was launched on 28 September 1992 to replace The Channel Four Daily, which was Channel 4's unsuccessful first foray into the breakfast television market. The Daily, which had focused on current affairs and news bulletins alongside bitesized magazine shows, a quiz show segment and a daily cartoon slot, had failed to attract enough viewers so Channel 4 opted to change direction and work towards a lighter style concentrating mainly on entertainment and humour with news bulletins restricted to brief summaries every 20 minutes.

Inspired by morning zoo radio, The Big Breakfast was unexpectedly successful against the dominant TV-am, and continued to increase its audience against its replacement GMTV. By January 1993 Channel 4's audience increased to 1.1 million, five times the 200,000 of January 1992. It brought many new young viewers, who previously had preferred radio to television, to the timeslot; the program had 28% of the overall audience, compared to Channel 4's 11% overall audience share. The first two presenters were Chris Evans (from 1992 to 1994) and Gaby Roslin (1992 to 1996). At its height in 1993, viewing figures reached around two million per edition, and it was the highest rated UK breakfast television programme. Along with Evans and Roslin, Bob Geldof presented a short-lived political interview slot. His wife Paula Yates interviewed people whilst lying on a bed, and the puppet characters Zig and Zag created morning mayhem in the bathroom with Evans in a slot called 'The Crunch'.

As part of his contract with The Big Breakfast, Evans was committed to developing a new show for Channel 4. Don't Forget Your Toothbrush began in early 1994, and Evans cut his involvement with The Big Breakfast to three days a week, Tuesday to Thursday. Neighbours actor Mark Little replaced Evans on Mondays and Fridays. When Evans left the show later that year, Little continued Thursdays, and Fridays while Paul Ross took over Mondays to Wednesdays. Richard Orford replaced Ross around Easter 1995 but was quickly dropped and exchanged with Down Your Doorstep presenter Keith Chegwin. In July 1995, the show reverted to using just one male presenter (Mark Little) throughout the week. Chegwin would cover for Little when he was on tour as a comedian or on holiday. Roslin would be covered by Australian singer/actress Dannii Minogue when she was on breaks from the show.

Roslin continued full-time until she made way for Zoe Ball in 1996. Audience figures dropped a little after Evans left, and a little further after Roslin departed. Mark Little left the programme in July 1996, following press reports that he and Ball had fallen out. Little was replaced by Keith Chegwin, who himself exited the programme in August 1996, just ahead of a relaunch. To stem the sliding viewing figures, the Big Breakfast house was refurbished at a cost of £2 million. New presenters Rick Adams and Sharron Davies were brought in but viewing figures fell dramatically. Davies left the programme in early 1997, to be replaced by Denise van Outen. Van Outen had initially been brought in as part of the September 1996 relaunch as a weather presenter, before being given a role based at the house as the phone room presenter and holiday relief for Davies. In June 1997, Johnny Vaughan covered for Adams for a fortnight alongside Van Outen, the pair forging a successful on-screen partnership. Adams left the programme shortly afterwards and, in September 1997, the Vaughan and Van Outen partnership was made permanent. Audience figures stabilised and the duo fronted the programme together until Van Outen's departure on 1 January 1999 (a New Year's Day pre-record). Kelly Brook was installed as Vaughan's new co-presenter despite an internet campaign for the role to be awarded to Liza Tarbuck, who had successfully covered for Van Outen in the summer of 1998. However, Brook struggled in the role and left the programme in early summer 1999. Liza Tarbuck, having again covered the co-presenter role alongside Vaughan prior to Brook's departure, was made permanent at the end of August 1999. She left the following summer and, following Vaughan's annual one-month summer break, Denise van Outen returned to co-host in September 2000 for Vaughan's final four months on the programme. Vaughan and Van Outen's final Big Breakfast was on 12 January 2001.

== Demise ==
The programme relaunched with a new logo and updated theme on 22 January 2001. The house had also been redecorated in more muted colours, echoing the ill-fated 1996 revamp. The programme moved to a lineup of three main presenters: Paul Tonkinson, Amanda Byram and Donna Air. However, Tonkinson was dropped from the programme at the end of March 2001 and Air left not long after. The programme reverted to two main presenters once more, with Byram and Richard Bacon. The living room, which had been repainted a dark red as part of the revamp, was changed to a bright yellow and pink design, while the main presenter chairs were also reinstalled in front of the living room's French windows. They replaced the bright-green sofa which had also been brought in as part of the revamp. The new logo was replaced with one more closely resembling the traditional Big Breakfast logo, albeit utilising a slightly different font. Mike McClean was given a role on the programme, as Down Your Doorstep presenter and cover for Bacon, most regularly on Fridays when Bacon would reprise his former Down Your Doorstep role alongside Johnny Vegas. During this time, a pilot episode was filmed on a Saturday with Chris Moyles and Dominic Byrne (reading the news) and Melinda Messenger, with Andy Goldstein doing links from Los Angeles. This pilot episode was shown to bosses at Channel 4, after which Moyles was offered the role but declined.

== Cancellation ==
In December 2001, it was announced that The Big Breakfast was to be axed the following March. This was due in part to Chris Moyles being offered the show after filming his pilot and being told if he took the show, they would "keep it"; otherwise, they would "scrap it". Ultimately, he chose against doing the show, as he couldn't "make up his mind" and wasn't sure he could do his afternoon radio show at the same time.

In the programme's final months, former cover presenter Lisa Rogers was given a role as an extra presenter while Zig and Zag returned for the final six weeks in their former slot, The Crunch, for which a new bathroom set was installed in the house. The final Big Breakfast aired on 29 March 2002 and included a retrospective that included contributions from Evans, Roslin, Vaughan and Van Outen. Both Evans and Vaughan declared the cancelling of the show a bad idea, but the show ended with a tribute from the Prince of Wales before the last ever Friday song. When the show finished, the house reverted to a private residence, now known as The Cottage. After renovation following a fire, it has also been used for a few television shows, including the one-off special edition of The Big Breakfast, which aired in 2021.

In total, 2,481 episodes were broadcast during the original run. Episodes were broadcast every weekday morning from 28 September 1992 to 29 March 2002, with exception of 12–14 September 2001, when it was replaced with news coverage of the September 11 terrorist attacks on the United States of America, for a total of 2,477. In addition to this, four extra episodes were broadcast on Christmas Day 1994 and Christmas Eve 1995 (both of which fell on the weekend), and the evenings of New Year's Eve 1992 and 1999.

== Innovations ==
Mark Lamarr, Keith Chegwin, Paul Ross, Richard Orford, Richard Bacon and Mike McClean were "down your doorstep" outside broadcasters, often turning up live and unannounced at an unsuspecting viewer's house, while rooms within the lock keepers' houses featured the puppets Zig and Zag and video games guru Ben the Boffin.

The show's style, with hand-held cameras moving around all of the set, meant that many of the crew members could be seen on screen.

== Reboot ==
In 2021, the show was rebooted and brought back by Channel 4 and hosted by the presenter, AJ Odudu and comedian Mo Gilligan having hosted a one off special for Channel 4's Black To Front. After one series, which consisted of four episodes, the reboot show was cancelled.

The Lancashire Telegraph reported that a Channel 4 spokesperson said: “Although there are no shows planned for this year The Big Breakfast may well return in the future.”

== Presenters ==
Main anchors
AJ Odudu	2021–2022
Mo Gilligan	2021–2022
Amanda Byram	2001–2002
Paul Tonkinson	2001–2002
Mike McClean	2000–2002
Donna Air	2000–2002
Lisa Rogers	2000–2002
Liza Tarbuck	1999–2000
Richard Bacon	1999–2002
Kelly Brook	1999
Denise van Outen	1997–2001
Johnny Vaughan	1997–2001
Sharron Davies	1996–1997
Rick Adams	1996–1997
Zoe Ball	1996
Keith Chegwin	1995–1996
Mark Little	1994–1996
Paul Ross	1994–1995
Gaby Roslin	1992–1996
Chris Evans	1992–1994

=== Co-presenters ===
On the Bed Interviewer
Judi Love	2021–2022
Johnny Vegas	2001–2002
Sara Cox	1998–2000
Vanessa Feltz	1996–1998
Paul O'Grady (as Lily Savage)	1995–1996
Paula Yates	1992–1995

=== Newsreaders ===
Main anchor
Phil Gayle	1997–2000, 2002, 2021–2022
Jasmine Lowson	2000–2002
Peter Smith	1992–1996

== Spin-offs and related programming ==
=== The Big Breakfast and The Bigger Breakfast ===
Between 1997 and 2000, during most nationally recognised UK school holiday periods, The Big Breakfast would run beyond its typical 9 am finish to provide continuity into and out of unrelated shows aimed primarily towards children. This would last throughout the morning, usually until around midday. Although typically presented to the viewer as simply a programme on Channel 4, most of The Bigger Breakfast is perhaps better classified as an informal style of in-vision continuity.

The strand also acted as an umbrella brand for the programming which it linked to, by use of Big Breakfast style break-bumpers and Digital On-Screen Graphics. The expanded format always featured the regular content of The Big Breakfast from 7 am to 9 am. The first run of The Bigger Breakfast during the summer of 1997 was titled as such all the way from its 7 am start, presented throughout by Richard Orford and Denise van Outen. Future editions would see slight separations made from the 7 am to 9 am content, by way of this portion of the show being branded and scheduled as The Big Breakfast, with all content after 9 am taking on the expanded Bigger Breakfast name. After a while, a further distinction was made by using a different set of presenters from that of The Big Breakfast. Presenters of The Bigger Breakfast included Josie D'Arby, Ben Shephard, Melanie Sykes and Dermot O'Leary.

Programming was primarily composed of reruns of Channel 4 shows and US imports. The line-up changed frequently. The list below is of some of series featured on The Big Breakfast and the Bigger Breakfast over the years:

- Adventures of Sonic the Hedgehog
- Babylon 5
- Batman
- Bewitched
- Biker Mice from Mars
- Boy Meets World
- Bug Juice
- California Dreams
- CatDog
- City Guys
- The Crystal Maze
- Dennis
- Earthworm Jim
- Eerie Indiana
- Fantastic Four
- Inspector Gadget
- Hang Time
- Hangin' with Mr. Cooper
- Johnny Bravo
- Madison
- Moesha
- The Monkees
- Mr. Bogus
- Planet Pop
- Pugwall's Summer
- Renford Rejects
- Rocko's Modern Life
- Sam & Max
- Saved by the Bell
- Sister Sister
- Sonic the Hedgehog
- The Secret World of Alex Mack

The Bigger Breakfast was discontinued after Christmas holidays in 2000. The block of programming provided within The Bigger Breakfast was retained, with Channel 4's youth strand T4 taking over the continuity role.

=== Snap ===
Snap Cackle Pop, a regular and recurring feature throughout the history of The Big Breakfast, was briefly retitled as simply Snap, in 1997. As well as continuing as a short, daily entertainment news feature within The Big Breakfast, Snap also became a show in its own right. Airing once weekly at 6.00pm on Channel 4, the half hour show was a light hearted round-up of recent news stories concerning popular entertainment in the UK.

Presented by Denise van Outen, the show was intentionally recognisable as being closely related to The Big Breakfast, from which it originated and continued to be part of. Snap contained a number of elements synonymous with The Big Breakfast, such as using the very same boudoir set and on-the-bed interviewing of guests. However, care was generally taken not to alienate viewers who were not so familiar with The Big Breakfast.

=== The Big Breakfast End of the Year Show 1992 ===
Three months after first appearing, Chris Evans, Gaby Roslin and Paula Yates hosted a live edition of the show, seeing in the new year of 1993. Zsa Zsa Gabor featured as a special guest.

=== The Biggest Breakfast Ever ===
On 1 January 2000, The Big Breakfast aired an extended New Year's Day edition entitled The Biggest Breakfast Ever, celebrating the arrival of the year 2000. Written by John Mann and Ged Parsons and broadcasting from 12:30 a.m. to just past 9:00 a.m., the special featured various retrospective features and the competition "Owe? No You Don't!"—where contestants competed in classic Big Breakfast games (concluding with the new game "Wonga") for a chance to have their debts paid off.

=== Talking Bowlocks ===
In January 2021, members of The Big Breakfast production team launched a podcast in which they discussed their experiences working on the series.

== Revival ==
=== 2021 "Black to Front Day" special ===
In September 2021, it was announced that the show would return for a one-off event known as "Black to Front Day", which would feature and celebrate the talents of those with black heritage. The show was presented by Mo Gilligan and AJ Odudu and had many guests from African American and Black heritages in celebration. The show was broadcast once again from the show's original home at Lock Keepers' Cottages.

=== 2022 relaunch ===
On 26 May 2022 it was confirmed that the series would return part time for four Saturdays in a two and a half hour slot from 13 August 2022, with Gilligan and Odudu again returning to host from a new house, revealed to be in Potters Bar, Hertfordshire. Denise van Outen returned as a guest to "hand over the reins" of the show to the two new presenters. In June 2023, a Channel 4 spokesman announced that there were no plans to commission any further episodes, but did not rule out the possibility of it returning at some point in the future.

== Features ==
=== Question About the Clip ===
Before most advertisement breaks a clip from an upcoming TV show or movie would be shown, a question being asked by one of the hosts about it; the answer would be revealed after the advert break, along with details of the show or film. This feature would result in the production team chorusing "Don't phone, it's just for fun!" which was a Chris Evans creation, initially used on his radio shows before he shot to fame on The Big Breakfast.

=== Question of the Day ===
A phone-in feature encouraging viewers to provide humorous answers throughout the morning to a pertinent (or occasionally inane) question. At one point it was accompanied by a fanfare, apparently played on the trumpet by "little Ted" beneath the camera (in fact a member of the team waving a toy trumpet in shot). One morning's question was "What should the BBC do to improve EastEnders?", and one viewer suggested adding Barbara Windsor to the cast; this actually occurred shortly afterwards.

=== Super Hints ===
"Your indispensable guide to a better life!", this feature appeared during the early years of the show; in it celebrities would give various simple but useful hints for such issues as cleaning or keeping food fresh.

=== Streaky Bacon ===
"Streaky Bacon" became a regular feature, in which Richard Bacon would get a member of the public out of their house to 'streak' along their street wearing nothing but bacon-covered underwear in order to win their weight in bacon from their local butcher.

=== Vital Statistics ===
"Vital Statistics" was another common feature, particularly in the Johnny Vaughan era. These would often relate to a news story, a guest or a topic they had discussed, such as Doctor Who on their Doctor Who Special.

=== On the Bed ===
A key feature for the first five years was the "On the Bed" interview. Paula Yates (the then wife of Bob Geldof, whose company produced the show), and later Paul O'Grady (as Lily Savage) and Vanessa Feltz assumed the role of interviewer. One of the most infamous on-air moments was Paula Yates' open flirting during an interview with Michael Hutchence as a prelude to their affair.

=== More Tea, Vicar ===
A repeating feature in the Vaughan and Van Outen era, in which an erratically filmed, sped up video clip of a line of tea cups was shown to a call-in viewer. Vaughan, dressed as an Anglican vicar, and Van Outen, dressed as a nun replete with false teeth and an inferiority complex, then explained the rules. The caller guessed the number of tea cups shown in the video lead in, with Vaughan responding "More tea, vicar" if the number is too low; "Less tea, vicar" if too high. If the contestant guessed the correct number within the time limit, a prize was awarded.

=== From Me Shed, Son ===
The inventor of the wind-up radio, Trevor Baylis, would join Johnny Vaughan in the shed to discuss innovative new products. Vaughan tended to make fun of Baylis for being older.

=== Wonga ===
A Jenga-style game, followed by various shouting and anarchy, with fans and the Wonga Lawyer. The show famously went over 27 minutes for a game once, with the Millennium Big Breakfast actually being commissioned with extra time for Wonga.

=== Wonga money ===
The Big Breakfast used to give out "wonga money" to people when they won money because they didn't want to give it to them on the show. They would give the real thing to them later.

=== The Friday Song ===
Each Friday the two main presenters and the whole crew would gather in the hallway for The Friday Song. The song would look back at events that happened on the show each week

The lyrics to the chorus went as follows:

Singing, wakey, wakey, wakey rise and shine,
The big breakfast is the only way to dine,
It's your number one big breakie
So get it down your neckie,
And stick with us from seven until nine!

=== Others ===
- Guess The Mess
- One Lump or Two?
- Sunny Side Up
- Pots Stop
- Telly Rellies
- Get Your Kit On
- Show Us Your Behind
- Court With Your Pants Down
- You Pet
- Spot the Sausage
- What's in My Pants
- What's Your Job, Bob?
- Yanks for the Memories
- Bring Home The Bacon
- Bowl The Vole
- Get Your Nobbly Nuts Out
- Egg On Your Face
- Young Fogey
- The Brian Moore The Merrier
- Pushy Mum
- Why
- Bun in the Oven (Bunny in the Oven was an Easter special)
- The Vincent Price Is Right
- Housey Housey
- Wheel Of Fish
- Stop The Mop
- Chicken In A Basket
- Moving The Goalposts
- My Lenny, Um, Gnome
- An Ostrich In Time
- Whose Washing Line Is It Anyway?
- Ice One Cyril
- Licence To Lurk
- Arrest The Vest
- Beat The Banger
- Game for a Bath
- Thatch of the Day
- Gaggin' for it
- Count-Down-Under
- Young Fogies
- Lost in Telly
- Vidal Balloon
- Who Wants to Win a Mini on-air
- More Tea Vicar?
- Whose shoes?
- Ohh what a lovely pair

== Lock Keepers' Cottages ==
Unusually for a live British TV show at the time of its creation, The Big Breakfast was broadcast entirely from a real house. Located alongside the River Lea, in east London, the property became informally known as 'The Big Breakfast House'. Filming would frequently take place within the large grounds of the property and the closely surrounding area. The cottages are in the London Borough of Tower Hamlets.

Built in 1947, the property originally comprised three cottages which housed the lock keepers, toll takers, and navigation operators of the Old Ford Locks in Bow. By the time of purchase by the programme-makers, Planet 24, in 1992, the property had become Grade II listed and had remained unused for around 20 years. Extensive renovation work saw the transformation of the three cottages into one large three-bedroom property, specifically fitted for use as a TV studio. The exterior character of the property was largely unchanged. During the first four years of the show, the given address for the house was number 2, Lock Keepers' Cottages, Old Ford Lock, London E3 2NN. The '2' was later dropped.

In 1996, due to the declining popularity of The Big Breakfast, the house was transformed in an art deco-style makeover. The original brickwork was virtually entirely covered over with a smooth rendered finish, painted white. Two large balconies now adorned the front and rear. The only untouched exterior features recognisable from the show's original styling were the four brick chimneys and the roof. The legality of this extensive makeover could be questioned as having broken the rules of its Grade II listed status. The work carried out is purported to have cost around £2million, largely funded by its sale to the show's broadcaster, Channel Four Television.

Structurally, the house largely remained in this style for the remainder of the series. The only notable structural alterations were the removal of the front balcony, the partial removal of the balcony to the rear and minor alterations to the styling of the doors and windows.

However, the character of the house was altered through several artistic makeovers to both the interior and exterior. The exterior was painted bright yellow, later a light brown similar in shade to the original brickwork, followed by a faux red brickwork effect which was painted onto the render. The latter style became the final look of the house, during the original show's final three-and-a-half years.

=== Cottages since The Big Breakfast ===
In November 2002, seven-and-a-half months after The Big Breakfast was axed, a fire destroyed a significant proportion of the first floor of the cottages. A large part of the roof was also destroyed in the blaze. The fire was deemed suspicious as there was no gas or electrical supply to the building.

The house was slashed in value because of the fire of November 2002, and was bought for little more than half the original asking price of £1 million at £550,000. Since the fire, extensive work has taken place to restore the house but some of the well-recognised aspects of the house from its use during the run of The Big Breakfast remain. It is now used as a family home.

The newly renovated house features in the BBC Two show Neneh and Andi Dish It Up, BBC Three's Singing With the Enemy, Too Fat To Toddle on ITV1, and the one-off revival of The Big Breakfast on Channel 4.

The cottages are located about 200 metres from the site of the main stadium used in the 2012 Olympic Games. In 2005, the cottages became part of a compulsory purchase order for the Games, giving rise to speculation that the building may be demolished. However, the cottages and gardens remain unchanged.

The house made a cameo appearance in a Channel 4 ident shown in the lead-up to the channel's coverage of the Paralympics in August 2012.

=== Life after Lock Keepers' Cottages ===
The Big Breakfast's return on 13 August 2022 has been confirmed to be from a new house, leaving the original Lock Keepers' Cottages behind for the first time in the show’s history. The new house is located in Potters Bar. Filming takes place on The Villa mansion, a seven-bedroom cottage set in ten acres of countryside.
