= Three Mills Residential Moorings =

Coordinates: 51°31′46″N 0°0′26″W

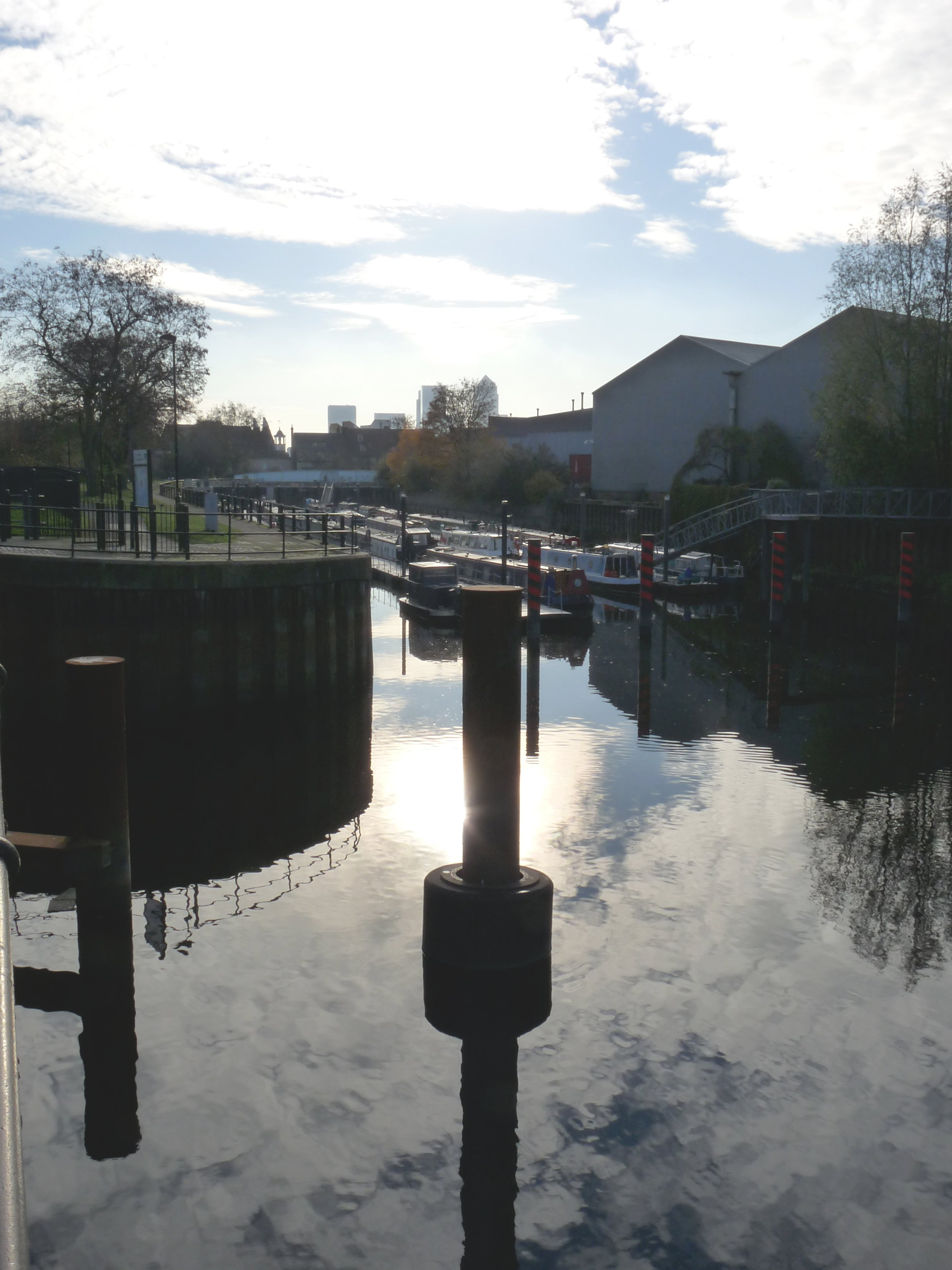
Three Mills Residential Moorings in 2010

Three Mills Residential Moorings is a community of twenty residential narrowboats moored on the Three Mills Wall River Weir near Three Mills in Mill Meads, Newham, East London, England. Historically as a tidal stretch of water, the residential moorings were converted to non-tidal in preparation for the London 2012 Olympics by the construction of a weir.

== Location ==
Access to the mooring is by two locks; City Mill Lock to the north and the Three Mills Lock in the Prescott Channel. Situated at Three Mills, in the southern section of the intricate Bow Back Rivers network of the lower River Lea tidal channels, the moorings are directly to the north of House Mill, a large tide mill Grade I listed building. The House Mill is Britain's oldest standing mill and the earliest on record, dating back to the Domesday Book.

== Regeneration ==
A joint regeneration project between Workspace Group and Newham Council, the development of a residential mooring at Three Mills with onshore facilities to include a garden and service areas was granted in 1998, with amendments in 2008 to reconfigure and improve the moorings. The explicit purpose of these plans was to provide affordable housing.

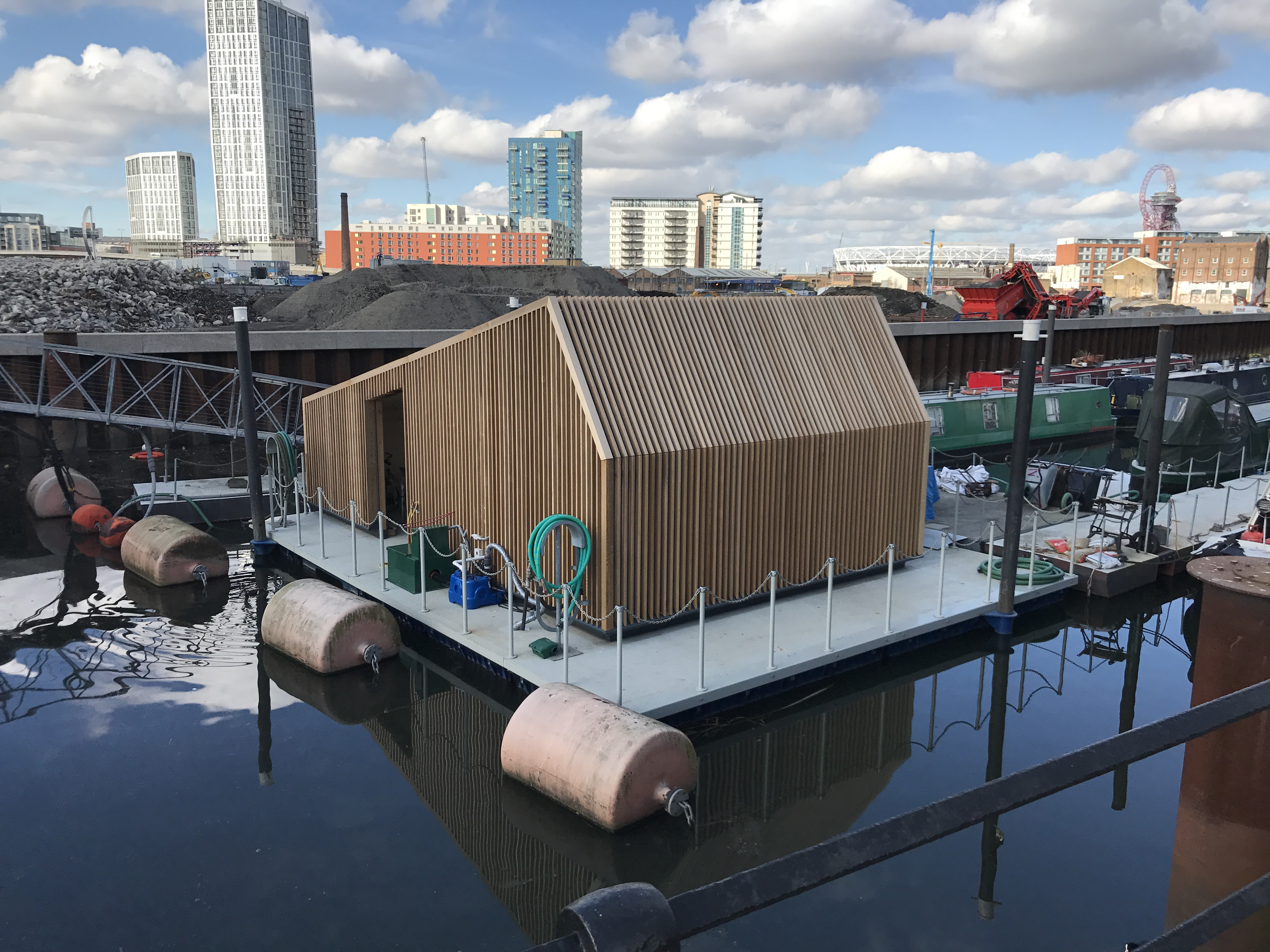
Floating laundry facility commissioned by Vastint for Three Mills Residential Moorings

Originally leased from the London Development Agency by Three Mills Studios, the moorings and surrounding land were purchased in 2011 by Vastint, the developer regenerating Sugar House Island, the 26-acre site next to the moorings. Vastint went on to upgrade facilities, creating a floating laundry, and a floating coal shed and bike store, designed by ARC-ML.
