= Three Mills Wall River Weir =

Weir on the Bow Back Rivers in London, England

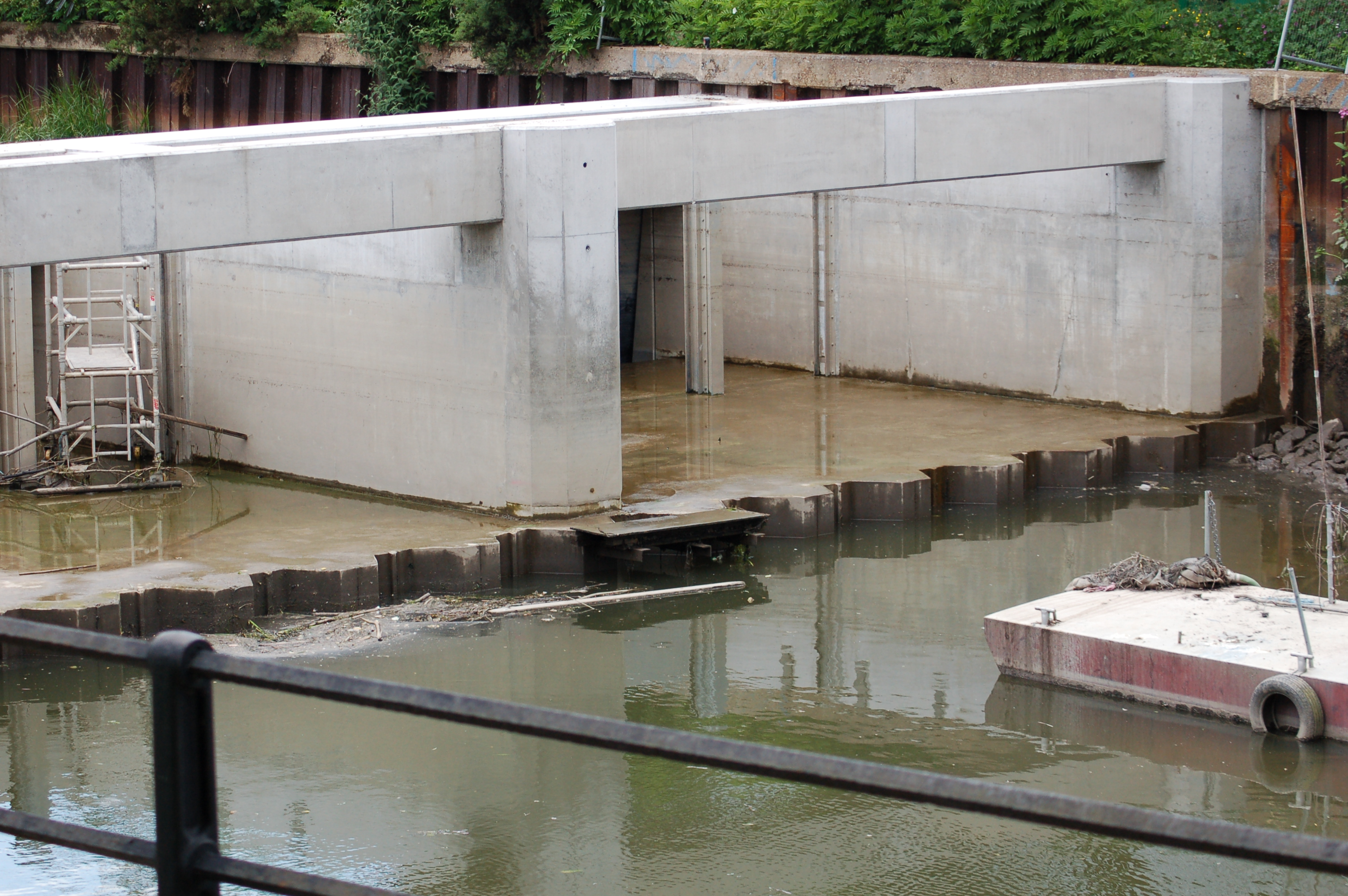
- The weir being constructed in the Three Mills Wall River
- 51°31′44″N 0°00′14″W
- Waterway: Bow Back Rivers
- County: Newham; Greater London
- Operation: Canal & River Trust
- First built: 2008–09
- Fall: tidal
- Works in conjunction with Three Mills Lock and sluice

Three Mills Wall River Weir is a weir on the Bow Back Rivers, in Mill Meads in the London Borough of Newham, England, near to Three Mills. It was built in 2009, when the Bow Back Rivers were refurbished to make them a key feature of the Queen Elizabeth Olympic Park, and maintains water levels through much of the park in conjunction with the Three Mills Lock and sluice on the Prescott Channel.

== History ==
There have been tide mills at Three Mills since at least the time of the Domesday Book. They were fed by the waters of the River Lea, supplemented by tidal water which flowed up the Bow Back Rivers from the River Thames, and powered the mills as the tide fell. The mills were supplied by the Three Mills Wall River, and prior to the reconstruction of the rivers as part of a flood defence project in the 1930s, by Three Mills Back River. There was also a weir from the Bow River, the section of the Lee Navigation between Bow Locks and Old Ford Lock. As part of the 1930s scheme, Three Mills Back River was filled in, and a flood relief channel called Prescott Channel was built which enabled flood flows to bypass the mills when required. The new channel incorporated a sluice, which maintained the water levels normally, so that the mills could still operate.

By the 1930s, there were only two mills left at Three Mills. They were used for milling corn, much of which was subsequently used to distill gin, but House Mill ceased operation in 1941, and Clock Mill followed in 1952. The sluice on the Prescott Channel seized up in the 1960s but with the mills no longer operating, it was effectively redundant and was subsequently removed.

The Bow Back Rivers were difficult to navigate, since at low tide there was insufficient water, and at high tide, there was inadequate headroom, particularly where the channels were crossed by the Northern Outfall Sewer. As part of the regeneration of the area connected with the 2012 London Olympics, plans were developed for the refurbishment of the rivers, to maintain them at an intermediate level. It was hoped that they could be used to deliver significant volumes of building materials for the construction of the stadium. In order to achieve this, a new lock and sluice structure was built on the Prescott Channel, but in order to maintain water at the desired levels, a sluice to prevent water bypassing the new structure was necessary on the Three Mills Wall River, and so the Three Mills Wall River Weir was built a short distance above Three Mills.

The weir has been constructed across the Three Mills Wall River (also known as Shortwall) by British Waterways. In conjunction with Three Mills Lock and sluice, the two structures stabilise levels at 7.5 feet (2.3 m) above ordnance datum (AOD) around the Queen Elizabeth Olympic Park, whereas they used to rise to 15.8 feet (4.8 m) AOD previously. The structures came into operation in 2009. Because the upstream water level remains fairly constant throughout the period when eels and elvers migrate, one of the flaps of the weir was fiited with a simple overflow eel pass. This reduced the flood capacity of that flap, but was not thought to increase the flood risk. The installation cost about £12,000.

The mill pound above House Mill and Clock Mill used to extend northwards to the Lea Bridge Sluices at Lea Bridge Road, but is now very small. House Mill was acquired by the River Lea Tidal Mill Trust, now the House Mill Trust, in 1985, and has since been refurbished and opened to the public. The mill wheels are not operational, and would not now be tidal, but the flow through the new weir could enable them to operate again, and in 2012 there were hopes that they could be used to generate hydroelectricity.

== See also ==
- Canals of the United Kingdom
- History of the British canal system

== Bibliography ==
- BW-London (August 2006). "Prescott Channel Water Control Structure" (PDF). British Waterways. Archived from the original (PDF) on 19 February 2012.
- Solomon, Dr D J (September 2010). "Eel passage at tidal structures and pumping stations" (PDF). Environment Agency, Thames Region. Archived (PDF) from the original on 26 August 2016.
- Thomas, Richard (2010). Bow Back Rivers. History of the Lee and Stort Navigation. Richard Thomas.
