= Mill Meads =

Coordinates: 51.531174°N 0.005515°W

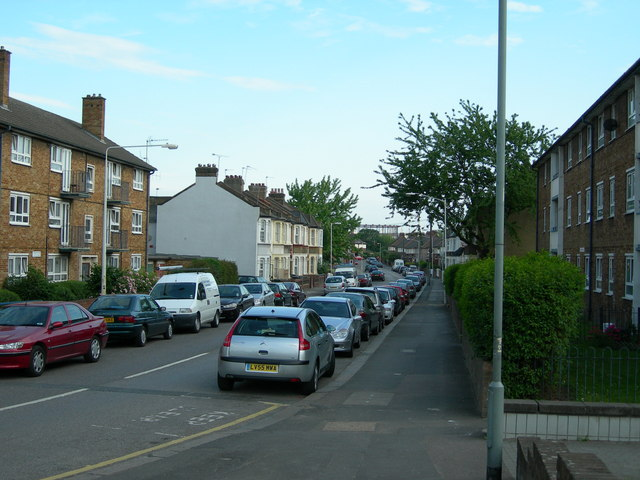
- Bisson Road

- Location within Greater London
- London borough: Newham
- Ceremonial county: Greater London
- Region: London
- Country: England
- Sovereign state: United Kingdom
- Post town: LONDON
- Postcode district: E3, E15
- Dialling code: 020
- Police: Metropolitan
- Fire: London
- Ambulance: London
- London Assembly: City and East

Mill Meads is an area in the borough of Newham in east London, located on the border with Tower Hamlets.

== History ==
House Mill is a major Grade I listed building The original tidal mills at this site date back to the Domesday book of 1086, and the present structure of the House Mill was built in 1776 by Daniel Bisson. It was damaged by fire in 1802, and then rebuilt by Philip Metcalfe. The 26-acre area of land opposite the Three Mills, shown in historical surveys as the Three Mills District, once housed a large cooperage producing barrels to support the mills, as well as a wide range of industries, from the manufacture of innovative inks to sugar refining.

The Abbey Mills Pumping Station is a sewage pumping station, designed by engineer Joseph Bazalgette, Edmund Cooper, and architect Charles Driver. It was built between 1865 and 1868.

In August 2004, the London Development Agency acquired 3 Mills Studios. As parent organisation of the Creative London agency, the LDA's role included supporting business and skills, researching industry needs, and promoting London for film-making.

A business district development known as Sugar House Island (previously announced as Strand East) is planned for the area by Vastint, which is expected will bring 2,500 jobs to the area, as well as waterside homes and amenity. The first homes were expected to go on sale in late 2019.

== Transport ==
Abbey Road DLR station is a Docklands Light Railway and is located on the Stratford International extension. It opened on 31 August 2011, over a year late, providing the community new links to the rest of London.
