= Three Mills Lock =

Lock on Prescott Channel

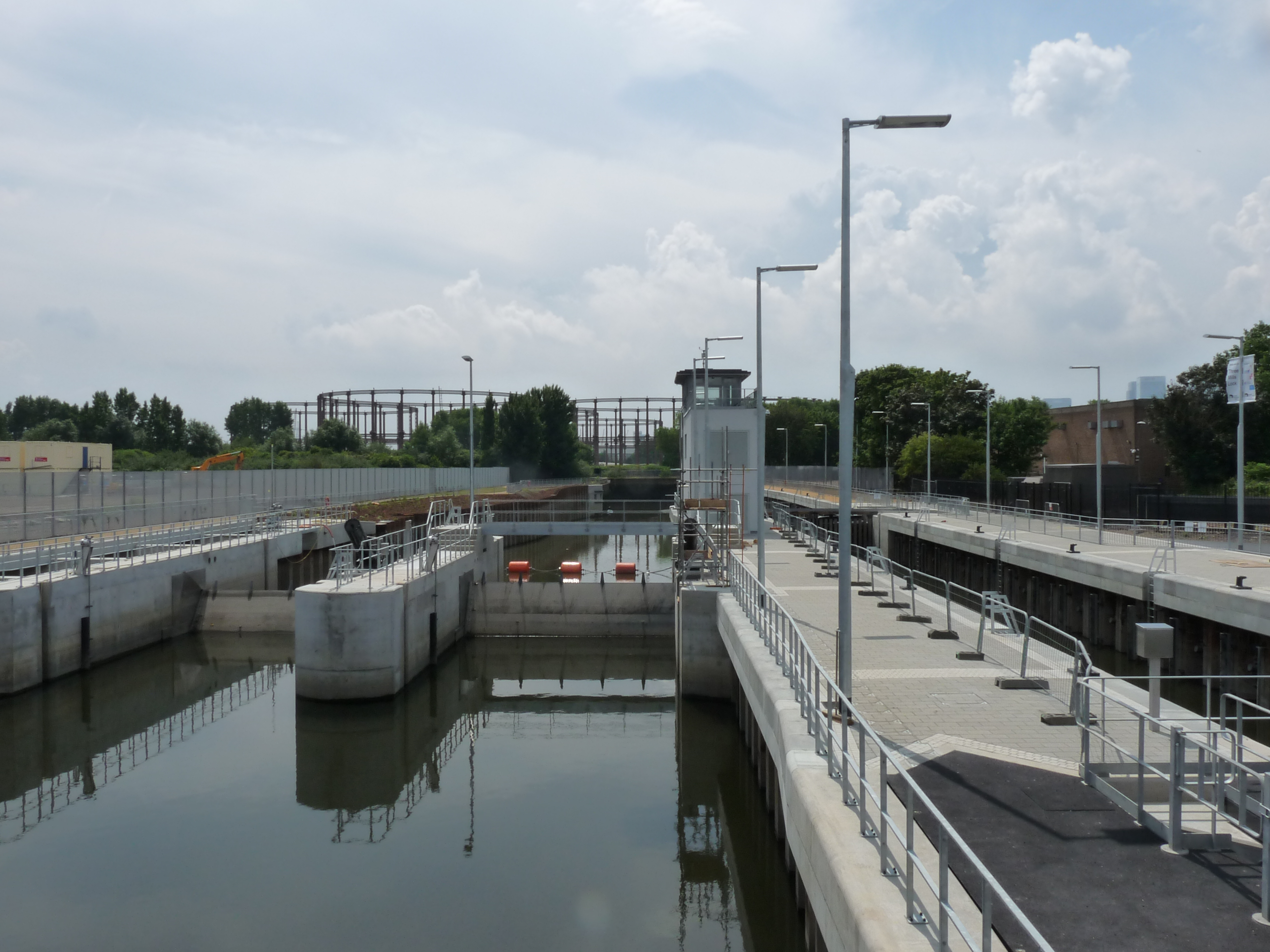
- Three Mills Lock
- 51°31′44″N 0°00′16″W
- Waterway: River Lee (Bow Back Rivers)
- County: Tower Hamlets; Greater London
- Operation: Canal & River Trust
- First built: 2008–09
- Length: 62 metres (203 ft)
- Width: 8 metres (26.2 ft)
- Fall: tidal

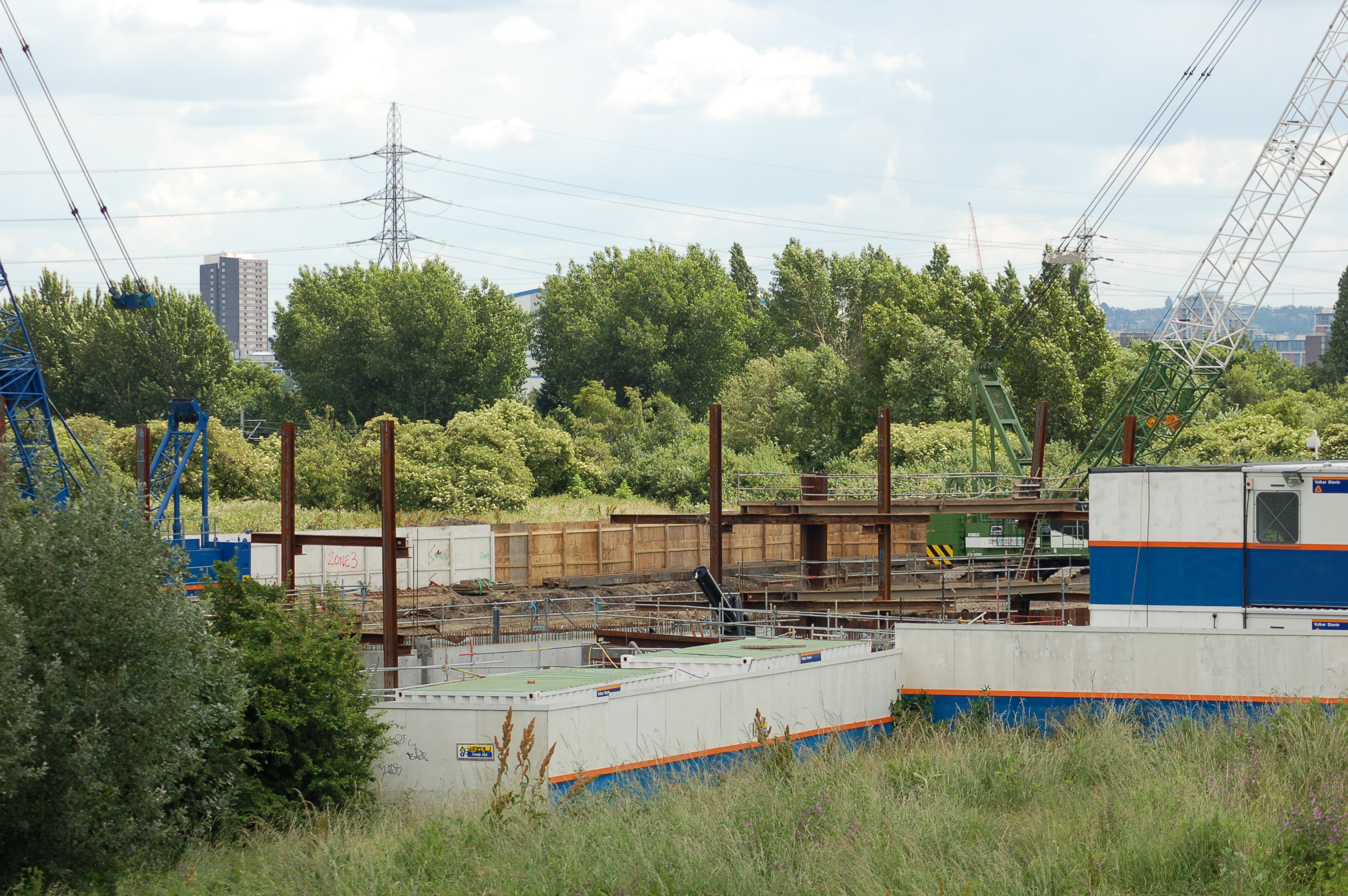
The construction site from Three Mills island.

Three Mills Lock, also known as Prescott Lock, is a lock on the Prescott Channel on the River Lea in London. The current structure was constructed by British Waterways and officially opened on 5 June 2009.

The lock cuts off a section of the Bow Back Rivers from the tide, creating new opportunities for leisure boats, water taxis, trip boats and floating restaurants. It also allowed barges carrying construction materials to access the sites of the London 2012 Olympics and Stratford City.

== Original lock ==
The original Three Mills Lock was constructed in the 1930s as part of a scheme for flood prevention and the creation of employment. It bypassed the tide mills at Three Mills, and included a sluice structure, which was used to control water levels in the Bow Back Rivers. This structure became inoperative by the mid 1960s, and was removed in the 1980s, by which point the Bow Back Rivers had been classified as "remainder waterways" by the Transport Act 1968, and there was no funding for maintenance. As a consequence of this, the rivers upstream reverted to being tidal. This made navigation difficult, since there was not enough water at low tide, and at high tide, there was insufficient headroom, due to the low level of the Northern Outfall Sewer, which crosses the waterways.

== New lock ==
With the selection of the island formed by the City Mills River and the Lee Navigation as the main site for the 2012 London Olympics, restoration of the Bow Back Rivers was considered an important part of the development, as it would allow construction materials to be delivered by barge.

A new lock and sluice structure was designed for the Prescott Channel, along with the Three Mills Wall River Weir to prevent tidal water flowing backwards through the Three Mills tidal mill. Prior to the development, tidal levels on the Bow Back Rivers reached 15.8 feet (4.8 m) above ordnance datum (AOD) on spring tides. The sluice is designed to stabilise levels at 7.5 feet (2.3 m) AOD, so the lock structure has to cope with levels on the downstream side which might be higher or lower than those on the upstream side.

The new lock is 203 feet (62 m) long, 26 feet (8 m) wide and 7.9 feet (2.4 m) deep, and is able to hold two 350-tonne barges (the present locks on the nearby Lee Navigation limit barges to about 120 tonnes). The tidal range is handled by the use of hydraulic sector gates at both ends of the lock, and the structure incorporates two large rising radial gates for flood control in the Bow Back Rivers.

A site in the river just south of this lock is the resting place of the remains of the Euston Arch. A footbridge for pedestrians and a fish pass for migrating fish was incorporated into the design of the lock, and British Waterways planned associated improvements to the navigation and tow path, as a part of the Olympic legacy.

An unexploded 2,200-pound (998 kg) Hermann bomb from World War II was found on 2 June 2008. The bomb was made safe, in a controlled explosion, after five days of disruption to tube and rail services.

== Impact ==
The effect of building the lock, together with the weir at Three Mills, was to lock out the tide just north of the House Mill. This means that this section of the Bow Back Rivers has ceased to be tidal. The lock was constructed so that barges from two large building projects (the London 2012 Olympics and Stratford City) could pass through the lock, taking spoil out and delivering building materials on to the sites, via a new wharf on the Waterworks River. Barges can pass directly into the northern section of Bow Creek to the River Thames. The head of water created by the lock may be used to fill the mill pound and once more allow operation of the Three Mills tidal mill.

The lock officially opened on Friday 5 June 2009, but the expected use of the lock for the construction of the Olympic Park was reportedly much lower than originally planned.

== Transport links ==
West Ham and Bromley-by-Bow are the nearest London Underground stations. The nearest Docklands Light Railway stations are Bow Church and Pudding Mill Lane

== See also ==
- Bow Back Rivers

== Bibliography ==
- Boyes, John; Russell, Ronald (1977). The Canals of Eastern England. David and Charles. ISBN 978-0-7153-7415-3.
- BW-London (August 2006). "Prescott Channel Water Control Structure" (PDF). British Waterways. Archived from the original (PDF) on 19 February 2012.
