= Philip Metcalfe =

English politician and distiller

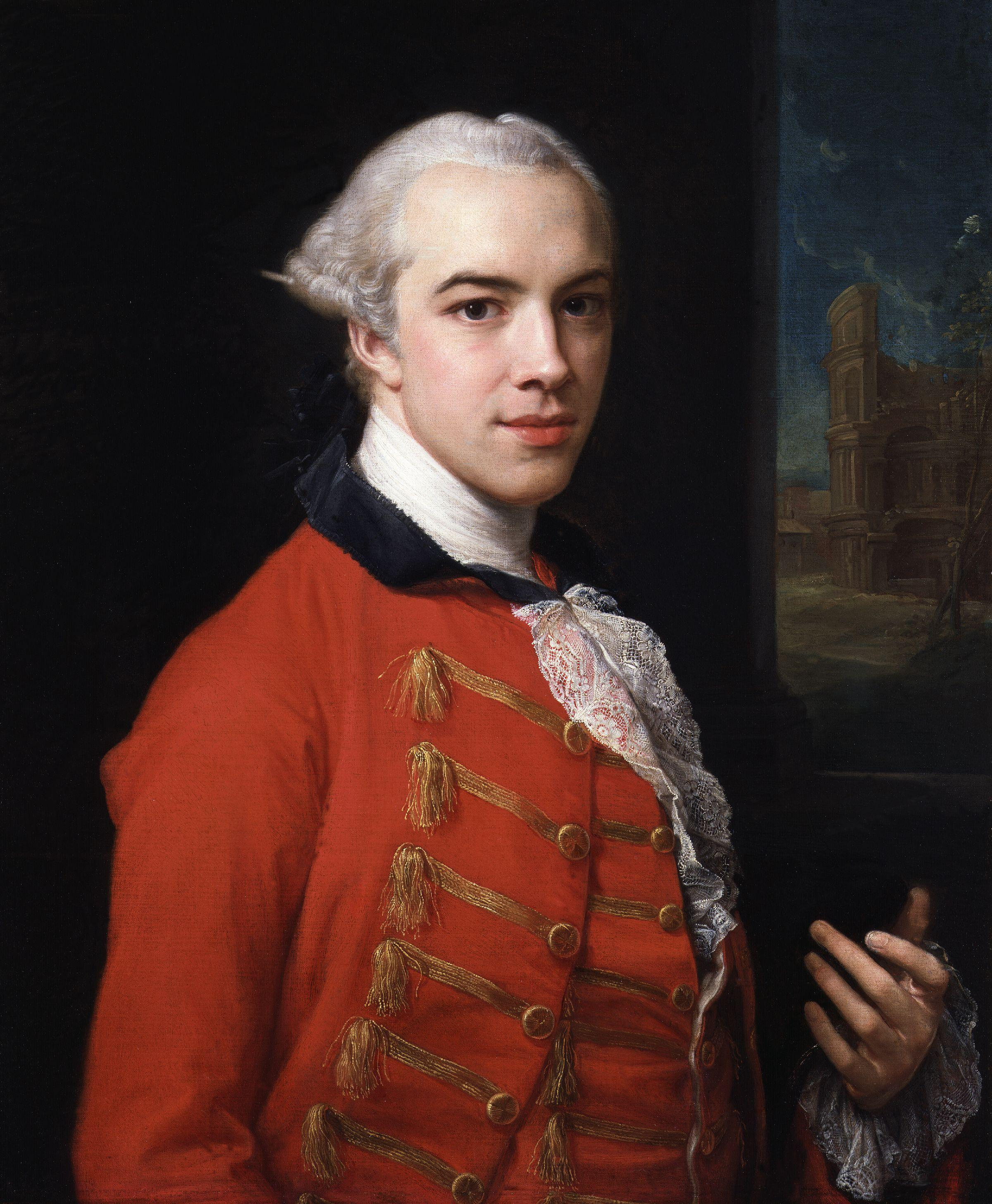
- Portrait (c. 1766–1767), oil on canvas, by Pompeo Batoni (1708–1787), National Portrait Gallery, London

Personal details
- Born: 29 August 1733 Holburn, London, England
- Died: 26 August 1818 (aged 84) Brighton, Sussex
- Occupation: Member of Parliament, Industrialist

Philip Metcalfe, MP, FRS, FSA, (29 August 1733 – 26 August 1818), was an English Tory politician, a malt distiller and a philanthropist.

The Metcalfe family were from Yorkshire of the Catholic faith and Royalists during the English Civil War.

== Family and early life ==
He was born in London on 29 August 1733 and christened in Much Hadham in Hertfordshire on 14 December 1733, second son of Roger Metcalfe (Note: English Jacobite James Radclyffe, 3rd Earl of Derwentwater body was taken to Metcalfe house who then embalmed it, Metcalfe remove the heart and preserved it.) (1680 – 5 January 1744–5), a surgeon of Brownlow Street (Note: Named after Sir John Brownlow of St Giles in the Fields.) now Betterton Street, Drury Lane, London and Jemima Astley (born on 3 August 1703). Metcalfe was named after his grandfather Sir Philip Astley (1667–1739), 2nd Baronet of Hill Morton. Jemima Metcalfe married afterwards to Henry Groome (Note: Born to Thomas Groome the younger, a tailor and a freeholder. Groome was christened in Gunthorpe, Norfolk on 4 November 1713 and died aged 77 years old. Groome was buried in St Michael Bassishaw, City of London on 11 May 1789. The marriage took place on 28 May 1745 in St Benet's, Paul's Wharf. Groome owned an estate in Hindolveston, Norfolk, estate left by Henry's elder brother, John Groome (died in 1782) of Melton Constable.), a limen-draper of St Paul's, Covent Garden and who was also the Keeper of the Guildhall and a member of the Worshipful Company of Musicians.

Metcalfe is said to have been the apprentice of Robert Jones (died in 1774), a wine merchant and East India Company director who became a member of Parliament for Huntingdon from 1754 to 1774. According to English painter and diarist Joseph Farington, Jones wanted Metcalfe to marry Ann Jones (1747–1832), his only daughter and sole heir, she was still a minor when she chose instead to marry with a Marriage license a British officer, James Whorwood Adeane (1740-1802) at Marylebone on 5 March 1763. Through his brother Christopher, Metcalfe became involved with the Three Mills venture in 1759. From partner, Metcalfe will eventually become the head of the Three Mills distillery.

== Business and parliamentary career ==
Metcalfe was the head of the firm Metcalfe and co, a West Ham distillery in Essex, the others partners were Metcalfe's brothers Christopher (Note: Christopher Metcalfe's son Christopher Barton married Sophia Andrews of Bulmer in Essex daughter of Mr and Mrs Andrews depicted in a famous painting by Thomas Gainsborough, Robert Andrews's other daughter Sarah was Samuel Jones Vachell first wife.) and Roger, James Mure (Note: Mure was the son of William Mure, one of the baron of the Scots exchequer.), James Baker (Note: Baker was a native of Norwich, he supervised the workmen who built the House Mill (1776) on the site of an earlier mill. In Metcalfe's will, Baker was appointed one of the trustees. One of his sons, John Baker was one of the deponents in a complaint brought against Ralph Dodd's London Distillery Company, the case was taken by Sir Vicary Gibbs, the Attorney General, the Crown hired Sir William Garrow (The Baker family Counsel). Baker died worth £40,000, British film producer Reginald Poynton Baker was his great-great-grandson.), William Bowman (Note: collateral ancestor of MP Godfrey Nicholson.), Samuel Jones Vachell (Note: Vachell son of William Vachell of Coptfold Hall in Essex, a friend of Sir Joshua Reynolds, Vachell attended Reynolds's funeral.) and Joseph Benjamin Claypole (Note: Claypole (1788–1853) born in West Ham, Essex, was Master of the Worshipful Company of Distillers (1849). He and his son Joseph were witness to Baker's will (1822), Charles Martin Senior, a solicitor and clerk of the Worshipful Company of Vintners and of the Worshipful Company of Fruiterers was one of the trustees.). Metcalfe was a member of Parliament for Horsham from 1784. He represented Plympton Erle, Devon from 1790 to 1796 and Malmesbury Wiltshire from 1796. Of his parliamentary career, Metcalfe left few records, each times voting on Pitt side including Richmond's fortifications plan along the southern coast of England (27 Feb 1786) and stood with him on the most debated Regency Bill of 1789.

== Arts ==
With the financial success brought by the gin trade, Metcalfe became a passionate art collector and was a patron of the arts. Among his friends and acquaintances were the writers Samuel Johnson, Frances Burney, the painter Sir Joshua Reynolds, the philosopher Jeremy Bentham and West India merchant and art collector Robert Fullarton Udny (1722–1802) of Teddington, Middlesex. He sat for two portraits that are in the collection of the National Portrait Gallery: one by Pompeo Batoni and one by draughtsman and engraver artist William Evans (after Edward Scott's stipple engraving).

He was appointed an executor to Joshua Reynolds's will, along with Edmund Burke and Edmond Malone.

In 1760 Metcalfe joined the Royal Society of Arts. In 1785, he was made a fellow of the Society of Antiquaries of London, in 1786 and in 1790, under Reynolds's patronage, Metcalfe was elected a member of the Society of Dilettanti (Note: treasurer (1794–1808) and secretary (1797–1808).) and of the Royal Society.

Metcalfe was also a member of the Club. and one of the co-signatories of a round robin sent to Dr. Johnson to implore him to revise his epitaph on poet Oliver Goldsmith.

== Legacy ==
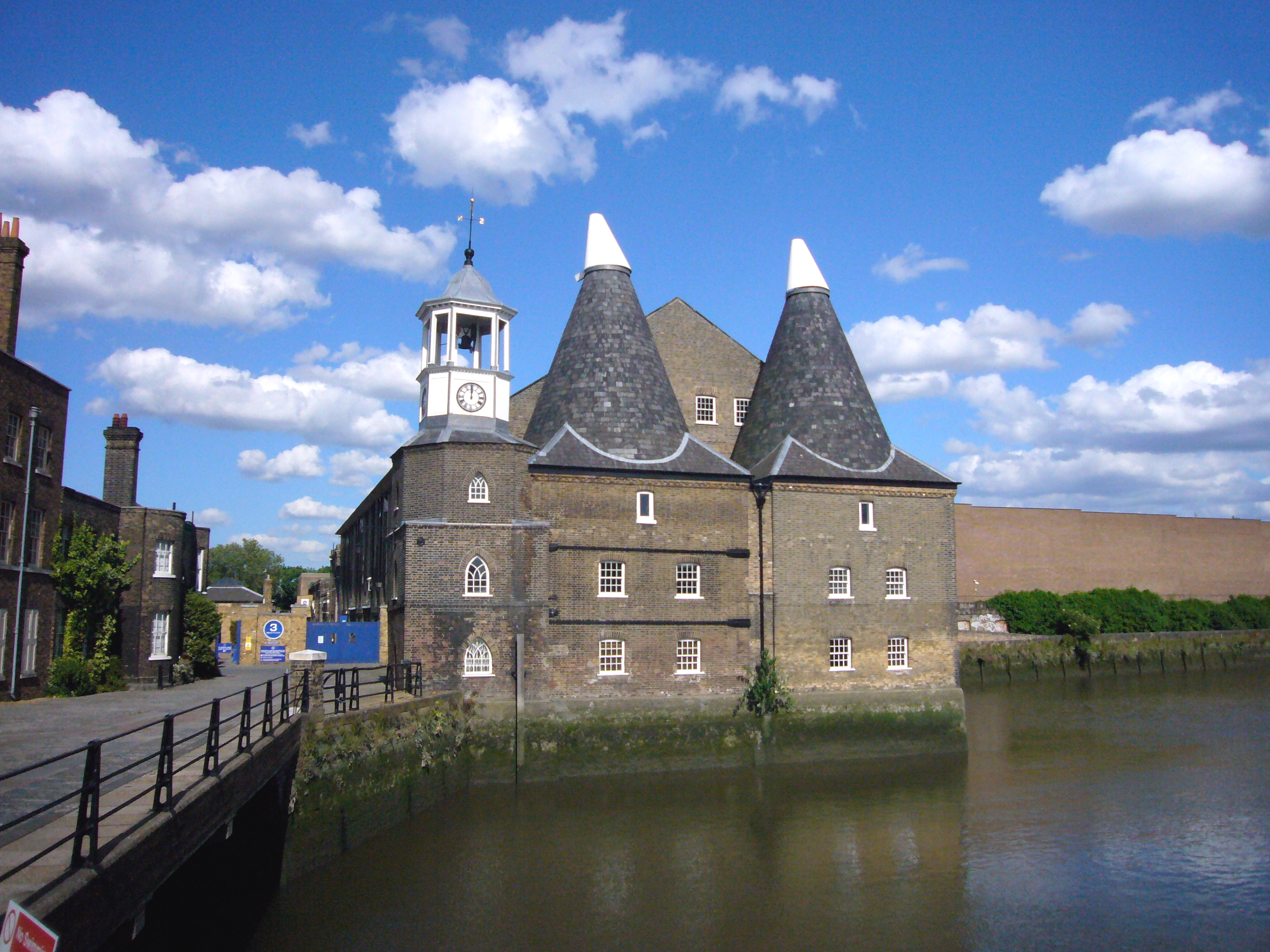
The Clock Mill

Between 1815 and 1817 he erected a new mill, the Clock Mill, at the Three Mills, decorated with an inscription bearing his initials PM.

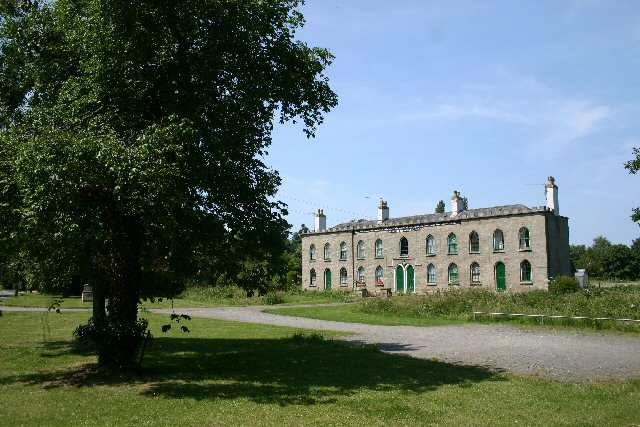
Alms houses at Hawstead

Metcalfe was noted for his benefactions to charity, he had erected at Hawstead in 1811 the Alms House for the benefit of the Aged and Deserving Poor.

== Miscellany ==
Metcalfe was mentioned with his associate and kinsman James Baker and Jesse Ramsden in the correspondence between Abraham Pilling (Note: In 1770 a prize was awarded by the Royal Society of Arts to Pelling for his works on optical glass.) and Evan Nepean.

== Later life ==
Metcalfe died a bachelor in Brighton, Sussex on 26 August 1818, aged 85. and was buried a week later on 3 September 1818 in the north aisle of the parish church of St Nicholas.

At the time of his death, his estate was valued at £400,000. Metcalfe heir was his great-nephew Henry Metcalfe (1790–1849), son of Christopher Barton Metcalfe and Sophia Andrews.

== Heraldry ==
The Arms are Argent, three calves passant sa.

== Sources ==
- The Early Journals and Letters of Fanny Burney, Volume V, 1782–3.
- Life of Samuel Johnson, Volume 4 by James Boswell.
- Eight Friends of the Great, by William Prideaux Courtney, published by London Constable and Company, 1910.
- The Three Mills, Brombley by Bow, Tide Mills, part three, by E.M Gardner with a foreword from Sir Godfrey Nicholson, MP, 13 March 1957.
- The Three Mills distillery in the Georgian era, by Keith Fairclough, published by River Lea Tidal Mill Trust Ltd
- Philip Metcalfe (1733–1818), the MP and industrialist who built the Clock Mill, by Keith Fairclough.

Parliament of Great Britain
Preceded by Sir George Osborn, Bt; James Craufurd	Member of Parliament for Horsham; 1784–1790; With: Jeremiah Crutchley	Succeeded by Timothy Shelley; Wilson Braddyll
Preceded by John Stephenson; John Pardoe	Member of Parliament for Plympton Erle; 1790–1796; With: The Earl of Carhampton 1790–1794; William Manning 1794–1796	Succeeded by William Adams; William Mitchell
Preceded by Samuel Smith; Peter Isaac Thellusson	Member of Parliament for Malmesbury; 1796–1801; With: Peter Isaac Thellusson	Succeeded by Parliament of the United Kingdom
Parliament of the United Kingdom
Preceded by Parliament of Great Britain	Member of Parliament for Malmesbury; 1801–1802; With: Peter Isaac Thellusson	Succeeded by Claude Scott; Samuel Scott
