= City Mill River =

Canal in east London, England

City Mill Lock
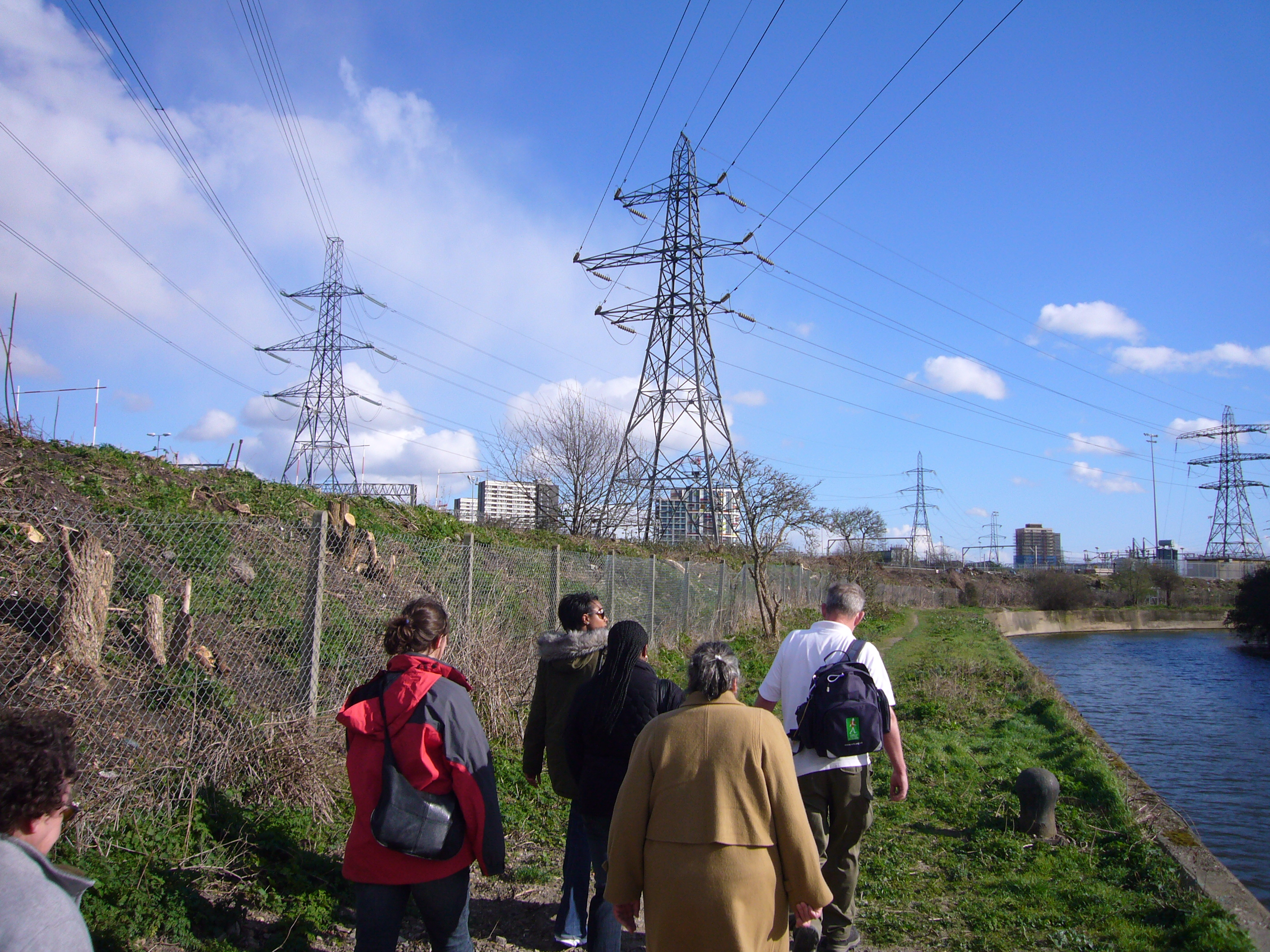
- Walkers next to the City Mill River in 2007
- 51.533323°N 0.009146°W
- Waterway: Bow Back Rivers; River Lee
- County: Newham, Greater London
- Maintained by: Canal & River Trust
- Operation: hydraulic

City Mill River is part of the Bow Back Rivers in London, England. It formerly fed City Mill, used for the production of chemicals in the late nineteenth and early twentieth centuries. In the 1930s, the mill was removed and the river was isolated from the tides by the construction of locks at both ends. City Mill Lock, at the southern end, has been refurbished and reopened in 2010.

== History ==
City Mill River leaves the old channel of the River Lea at its northern end, and flows in a south-easterly direction, originally to City Mill. Town plans from 1895 and 1923 both indicate that it was used for the production of chemicals. The mill straddled the channel, and a bypass stream flowed to the west of the present course, to meet the Waterworks River below the mill. The discharge from the mill was into a large pool, which also formed a part of the Waterworks River. By the late 1920s, most of the Bow Back Rivers including the City Mill River were in serious decay, and the Lee Conservancy Board, jointly with West Ham Corporation, obtained a government grant as part of an unemployment relief scheme to carry out a number of improvements to the rivers. The work was authorised by the River Lee (Flood Relief) Act 1930 (20 & 21 Geo. 5. c. cxcii) and work began in 1931, taking four years to complete.

The course of the river was largely unchanged by the improvements, except at the southern end, where the mill was demolished, and the channel was routed through the mill site. Part of the mill basin was filled in, and the river joined Bow Back River, which was moved slightly further to the north, away from Bow Road and Stratford High Street. The Waterworks River, to the east of the mill basin, was widened and routed further to the west, and a connecting lock was built between the new course of the City Mill River and the new course of the Waterworks River. The river ceased to be tidal, as City Mills Lock isolated the southern end from the tidal Waterworks River, and Carpenter's Lock isolated the northern end, allowing the river to be maintained at the same level as Limehouse Cut. It became semi-tidal, since the water level in Limehouse Cut was maintained by Bow Locks, but high tides overtopped the gates, resulting in there being fluctuations at spring tides.

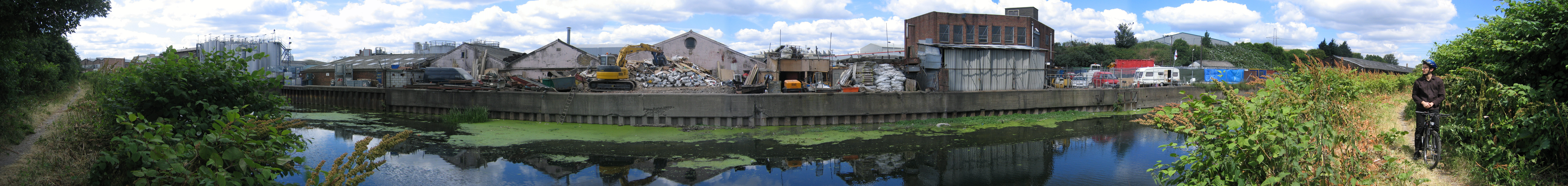
Panoramic view of City Mill River

== City Mill Lock ==
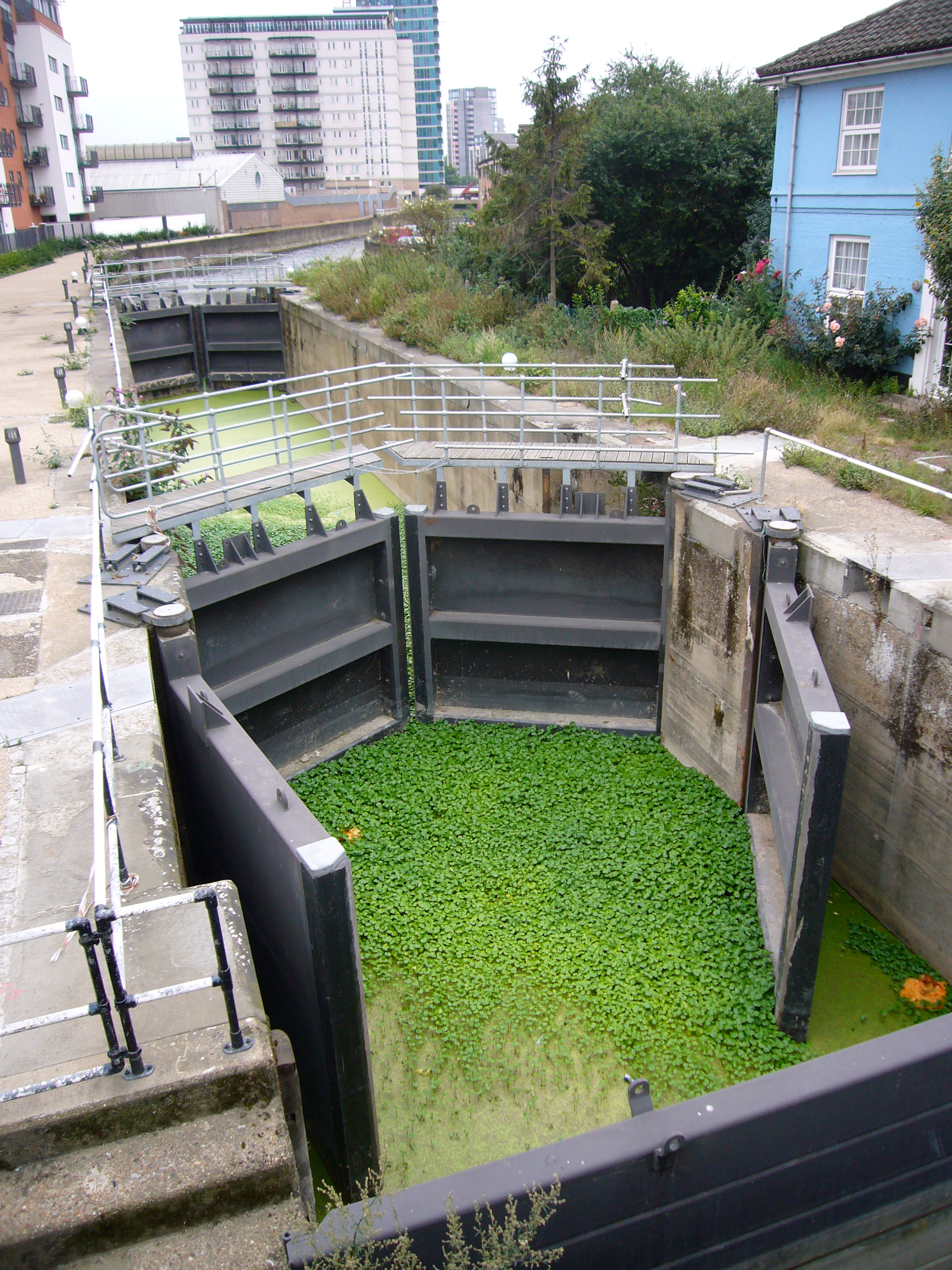
City Mill Lock, showing both the infestation of water pennywort, and the pair of bi-directional tidal gates on the lock.

City Mill Lock, which connects Bow Back River and the bottom of the City Mill River to the Waterworks River, was built as part of the 1930s improvement programme. Unlike Carpenter's Lock, which was built at the same time and was fitted with vertical radial gates, City Mill Lock was built with conventional mitre gates. Two pairs of gates pointing to the west, allowing the lock to be used when the level of the water in the Waterworks River was lower than that in the City Mill River, and a third pair pointing to the east, which prevented high tide levels in the Waterworks River forcing the gates open, and the City Mill River draining as the tide fell. The lock was 20 feet (6.1 m) wide, and could handle boats up to 87 feet (27 m) long. The original gates lasted for almost seventy years, but by 2000 were deemed to be unsafe, and were replaced by stop planks.

In 2005, the lock was partially restored as part of the planning gain required from the developers of the adjacent Bellamy Homes housing scheme. Three sets of new steel gates, manufactured in Sheffield by Mandall Engineering, were installed at a cost of £200,000, and a further £100,000 was spent on general improvements to the area and the access paths to the lock. This left the lock in good condition, but not operational, since the gates did not have balance beams, and the hydraulic operating mechanism was not included in the work. Funding for the provision of the equipment came from the development of the area for the 2012 Olympic Games. Another £200,000 wes spent on the hydraulic rams, sluices, and the associated controls, and on lock ladders and landing stages to enable the lock to be used safely by boaters. The work was completed in 2010, and the lock was formally opened on 31 July.

The work involved dealing with large amounts of plant growth, particularly water pennywort, Hydrocotyle ranunculoides, a member of the apiaceae, which were treated with herbicides to remove them. Water pennywort is a non-native invasive species, which quickly forms a dense mat of vegetation on the surface of slow-moving water, preventing the growth of other species and the movement of animals and boats.

== Bibliography ==
- Boyes, John; Russell, Ronald (1977). The Canals of Eastern England. David and Charles. ISBN 978-0-7153-7415-3.
- Thomas, Richard (2010). Bow Back Rivers. History of the Lee and Stort Navigation. Richard Thomas.
