= Bow Back Rivers =

Waterways in east London

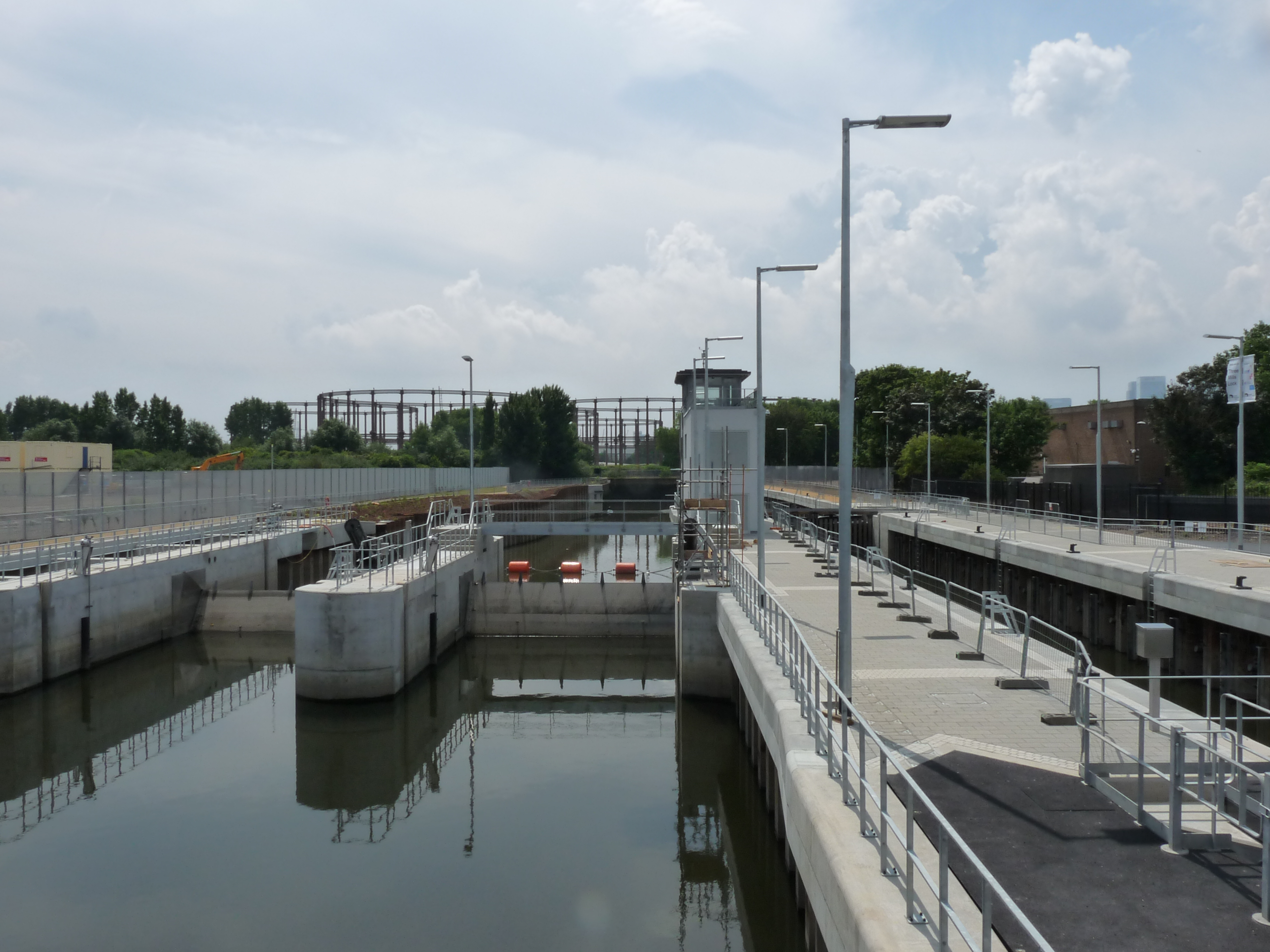
- The sluices at Three Mills Lock, with the lock structure to the right
- Interactive map of Bow Back Rivers

Specifications
- Locks: 4
- Status: Open
- Navigation authority: Canal and River Trust

Geography
- Connects to: Lee Navigation, River Lea, Bow Creek

Bow Back Rivers or Stratford Back Rivers is a complex of waterways between Bow and Stratford in east London, England, which connect the River Lea to the River Thames. Starting in the twelfth century, works were carried out to drain Stratford Marshes and several of the waterways were constructed to power watermills. Bow Creek provided the final outfall to the Thames, and the other channels were called Abbey Creek, Channelsea River, City Mill River, Prescott Channel, Pudding Mill River, Saint Thomas Creek, Three Mills Back River, Three Mills Wall River and Waterworks River.

The rivers have been subject to change over centuries, with Alfred the Great diverting the river in 896 to create a second channel, and Queen Matilda bridging both channels around 1110 by paying for the construction of Bow Bridge.

Because the river system was tidal as far as Hackney Wick, several of the mills were tide mills, including those at Abbey Mills and those at Three Mills, one of which survives. Construction of the New River in the seventeenth century to supply drinking water to London, with subsequent extraction by waterworks companies, led to a lowering of water levels, and the river was gradually canalised to maintain navigation. Significant changes occurred with the creation of the Lee Navigation in 1767, which resulted in the construction of the Hackney Cut and the Limehouse Cut, allowing barges to bypass most of the back rivers. A major reconstruction of the rivers took place in the 1930s, authorised by the River Lee (Flood Relief) Act 1930 (20 & 21 Geo. 5. c. cxcii), but by the 1960s, commercial usage of the waterways had largely ceased. Deteriorating infrastructure led to the rivers dwindling to little more than tidal creeks, and they were categorised in 1968 as having no economic or long-term future, although in April 1968 barges were still being used to convey massive tree trunks to some canal-side timber yards between Old Ford locks and the Hertford Union junction. (For photos of barge traffic in 1968, see "Waterways World", April 2012 pp. 58–61: "London's Olympic Waterways", ISSN 0309-1422).

However, British Waterways decided that their full restoration was an important aim in 2002, and the construction of the main stadium for the 2012 Summer Olympics on an island formed by the rivers provided funding to construct a new lock and sluices which stabilised water levels throughout the Olympic site. It was hoped that significant amounts of materials for the construction of the Olympic facilities would be delivered by barge, but this did not happen. Improvements to the channels which form a central feature of the Olympic Park included the largest aquatic planting scheme ever carried out in Britain.

== Name ==
It is unclear when the individually named rivers became known collectively as Bow Back Rivers. Charles Tween, writing on behalf of the Lee Conservancy, referred to them as both the Stratford Back Rivers and the Stratford Back Streams in 1905. The section to the west of the more recent City Mills Lock was labelled Bow Back River on a map of 1895, but had previously been part of Pudding Mill River. Powell, writing in 1973, still referred to them as the Stratford Back Rivers.

The 1939 edition of "Inland Waterways of Great Britain", an early attempt to provide a guide for the leisure use of canals, noted that the River Lee had "several subsidiary canalised waterways", and listed Bow Creek, Old River Lee, City Mills River and Waterworks River, but did not describe them collectively. Boyes and Russell writing in 1977 referred to them as the Bow Back Rivers or Stratford Back Rivers, and by the sixth edition of "Inland Waterways of Great Britain", published in 1985, they were referred to as Bow Back Rivers.

The river which supplies the Bow Back Rivers has been known as the River Lee or River Lea, but modern usage tends to use "Lea" when referring to the natural river, and "Lee" when referring to the navigation, so that the Lee Navigation is a canalisation of the River Lea. The name Bow may derive from either an arched bridge over the River Lea in the 12th century or a bend in the road east of Bow Road station.

== History ==
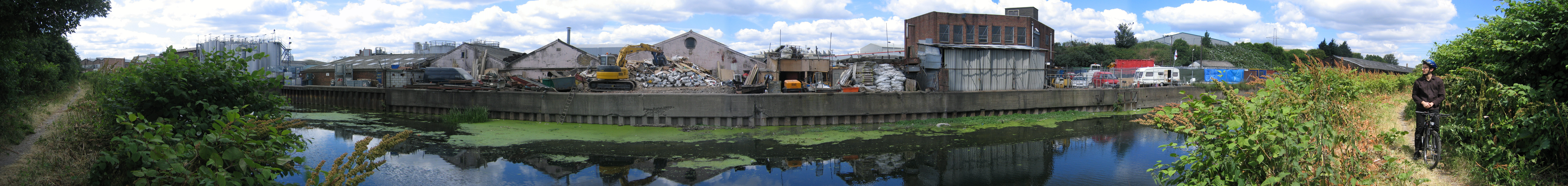
City Mill River, Bow Back Rivers (2004)

The Bow Back Rivers cross an area originally known as Stratford Marsh, an area of common Lammas land, where inhabitants had common rights to graze horses and cattle between Lammas Day (1 August) and Lady Day (25 March), but which was used for growing hay for the rest of the year. The Marsh was between Stratford-Langthorne and Stratford-at-Bow. Little remains from pre-history, but the names suggest that the two settlements lay at either end of a stone causeway across the marsh. Remains of a stone causeway have been found, but no traces of an associated road. The ford at Old Ford is of pre-Roman origin, part of a route from London to Essex which crossed Bethnal Green. In the Roman era, a new road was built from London to the ford, which carried the principal road to Colchester. There may also have been a ford further south at Bow, and a further causeway existed between Homerton and Leyton, known as Wanstead Slip.

These crossings passed across a true marsh, either side of the River Lea. This wide, fast flowing river was then tidal as far as Hackney Wick, and navigable as far as Hertfordshire. Dates for the earliest use of the rivers by boats are unknown, although a late Bronze Age dugout canoe and parts of a Saxon barge have been found in the marshes at Walthamstow. The first alteration to the natural river may have been made by Alfred the Great, who cut another channel to strand a force of Danes in 896, according to the Anglo-Saxon Chronicle. This lowered the tide head to Old Ford, and prevented large boats sailing the river until the 15th century.

During the reign of King Henry I, in 1100, his wife Queen Matilda (or Maud), directed that the road should be routed further south, and paid for two bridges, one to cross the Lee and the other to cross the Channelsea River, from her own funds. She also paid for the road to be built between them, and the location of the bridge became known as Stratford-atte-Boghe, later Stratford-le-Bow, and finally dropped Stratford to become Bow or Bow Bridge. John Leland, writing in the 1500s, gives a more fanciful account, in which the queen falling into the water prompted the action. The addition of le-Bow probably had less to do with the shape of the bridge than the fact that arch was derived from arcus, meaning bow. This was the style of French bridges rather than the Anglo Saxon straight construction, and its design gave it its name.

In 1135, Stratford Langthorne Abbey was founded. The Abbey continued the process of draining Stratford marsh begun in the Middle Ages and creating artificial channels to drive water and tide mills. A small river port developed at Stratford, mentioned in the 15th century, to serve the needs of Stratford Abbey and the mills at Stratford, and there is similar evidence in later centuries. The Abbey took on responsibility to maintain the marsh walls around Bow Creek, to keep the tidal waters out. The river was being used for the transport of goods and passengers by 1571, when an act of Parliament, the River Lee Navigation Act 1571 (13 Eliz. 1. c. 18), empowered the Lord Mayor of London to make improvements to the river to ensure that supplies of grain continued to reach the capital. These works included a new cut near the Thames, probably the section of river between Bow Tidal Gates and Old Ford, on which no tolls were to be charged, and a pound lock was constructed at Waltham Abbey, only the second to be built in England.

Between Bow Bridge and Channelsea Bridge there were three others, said in 1303 to have been built to fill the gaps caused by the cutting of mill streams through Maud's causeway, although there is evidence that the mills pre-dated the causeway. However, the mill owners took responsibility for the bridges, which crossed the mill streams for St Thomas's, Spileman's and Saynes mills. The last two were owned by the City of London, and the bridges were called Pegshole and St Michael's Bridges. An administrative mistake around 1814 resulted in the City of London taking responsibility for St Thomas's Bridge, but the miller did not complain as Pegshole bridge was smaller and therefore less costly to maintain. The names were eventually swapped, and all three were replaced by Groves Bridge in 1933, which crossed the widened Three Mills Wall River, the two branches of the Waterworks River having been combined into Three Mills Wall River, while Three Mills Wall Back River was filled in.

Crossing the Back Rivers by a series of low-level bridges is the Northern Outfall Sewer which leads to the Abbey Mills Pumping Station, both of which were designed by Joseph Bazalgette in the 1860s. Today, the route of the embankment that encloses the sewer from Bow to Beckton is followed by a public footpath, The Greenway.

=== Public water supply ===
Water was extracted from the rivers to provide a public water supply. The opening of the New River in 1633, a 40-mile (64 km) channel built to bring water to London from Amwell springs, and soon afterwards from the River Lea near Ware, had a detrimental effect on both navigation and milling by reducing water levels. Around 1745, the West Ham Waterworks Company built a waterworks at Saynes Mill in Stratford, the river on which it was located later being known as Waterworks River. The East London Waterworks Company was set up in 1807, and built works at Old Ford, where they extracted water from the river. The supply to the works was moved further upstream in 1829, and in 1830 they built a canal, running parallel to the Hackney Cut, so that water could be obtained from Lea Bridge. Much of the work was carried out by the contractor William Hoof, who had gained a reputation as a specialist tunnelling contractor, after working on Strood Tunnel for the Thames and Medway Canal and Harecastle Tunnel on the Trent and Mersey Canal. He worked on the waterworks project from 1829 until 1834. Where there had been a reservoir to the south of the Middlesex Filter Beds weir in 1850, maps from 1870 show the site occupied by a waterworks, and the canal which supplied the Old Ford works running beside the Hackney Cut. Another large reservoir, triangular in shape, was located between the old river and the Hackney Cut at Old Ford, with two connections to the old river. The water supply canal passed under the old river to feed two compensation reservoirs to the north of the Great Eastern Railway tracks. A covered reservoir was situated on the west bank of the old river.

The Waterworks River underwent considerable change over the years. In 1850, it left the channel of the Old River Lee much further to the north, to the south-west of Temple Mills railway depot. It was called Lead Mills Stream at this point. Near Temple Mills bridge, now on the A12 road, Channelsea River split off. The two channels ran parallel to the Old River Lee, before Channelsea River turned to the south-east. There was another small connection between the Old River Lee and the Waterworks River called Bully Fence, where the northern Channelsea River is shown on modern maps. By 1870, it was called Waterworks River as far north as Temple Mills depot, and by 1896, its present connection to the old river near to Carpenters Road had been established. Twenty years later, the northern Waterworks River rejoined the Lee at Bully Fence, and the section between there and Carpenters Road had been filled in. At some point, the connection at Bully Fence became the main source for the Channelsea River, although the 1953/66 map still shows it connected to the remnants of the system to the north, for drainage. Administrative boundaries still follow the northern course of the Waterworks River.

=== Navigation ===
Although the River Lee was navigable up to Hertford, this had been achieved by the use of flash locks, where a single gate created a channel through a weir. These caused conflict between the bargemen and the millers, since operation of the lock lowered the water level above it, hindering the operation of the mill. In 1765, the engineer John Smeaton was asked to survey the river, with a view to improving it "for the good of the public". His report of September 1766 highlighted the need to replace the flash locks with the more modern pound locks or pen sluices, each with two sets of gates. Significantly for the Bow Back Rivers, he suggested a new cut from Lea Bridge to Old Ford, and another from Bow Tidal Gates to a basin at Limehouse. The first became known as the Hackney Cut, and the second as the Limehouse Cut. An act of Parliament, the River Lee Navigation Act 1767 (7 Geo. 3. c. 51), was obtained on 29 June 1767, and work began.

The Limehouse Cut would give direct access to the River Thames, avoiding the tidal Bow Creek. It was expected to open in July 1770, but some of the brickwork collapsed, and had to be repaired before the cut opened on 17 September 1770. It closed again briefly in December, when a bridge collapsed into it, and it was soon decided that it was too narrow, and so was widened to allow barges to pass each other along its complete length. This work was finished on 1 September 1777. The contract for the Hackney Cut was given to Jeremiah Ilsley on 18 January 1768, and a bricklayer called Henry Holland was asked to build two locks on the cut on 23 April 1768. A millwright from Bromley called Mr Cooper was given the job of building Bromley Lock (close to Bow tidal gates). Work progressed quickly, and the cut was opened for traffic on 7 August 1769.

The River Lee Navigation Act 1767 had specified points on the river at which tolls could be collected, but had made no mention of tolls for use of Bow Creek, Bow Back Rivers, or the section of the navigation between Bow tidal gates and Old Ford, and these had remained toll-free. An act of Parliament, the Lee Navigation Improvement Act 1850 (13 & 14 Vict. c. cix), obtained on 14 August 1850 allowed the trustees to build a pound lock at Bow tidal gates. To prevent opposition from the bargees, the act had formalised the freedom from tolls on the Bow River section. Once the lock was built, however, the trustees charged a toll for using it. This was unpopular, but there was still the option of using the tidal gates at certain states of the tide, which did not incur a toll. A clause to authorise the lock toll was deleted by Parliament from a subsequent act, the Lee Conservancy Act 1868 (31 & 32 Vict. c. cliv), and it was still the case in 1977 that a charge was made for using the lock but not for using the gates.

By 1821, Stratford was served by a number of wharves, some located on the Lea and others on the Channelsea River or other branches. In addition to wharves for general goods, some specifically handled timber, chalk, stone, coal, or wheat. Several of the factories and mills had private wharves. By this date, a dock had been built near Bow Bridge to the south of the High Street. It was about 80 by 50 yards (73 by 46 m), and was connected to the river by its own channel. It was initially called Stratford Dock, later becoming Meggs Dock and was probably constructed by the Middlesex and Essex Turnpike Trust. Half of it had been filled in by 1896, and the rest by 1920.

In the 1860s, the income from the navigation had dropped, as a result of attempts to compete against the railways, but economies were made, and capital works continued. The lock at Lea Bridge was removed, and replaced by Old Ford Lock further to the south, which was built to take 100-ton barges, rather than the 40-ton barges specified by the Lee Navigation Improvement Act 1805 (45 Geo. 3. c. lxix). Although the original Lee trustees, and after 1868 the Conservators of the River Lee, were officially responsible for the Bow Back Rivers, there was little incentive to maintain them, since they did not generate any revenue. Nor could they be closed, since they allowed surplus water from the upper river to reach the Thames, without causing flooding.

=== Regeneration ===
The rivers were run down by the 1920s and, with high unemployment in the area, West Ham Corporation and the Lee Conservancy Board applied for a government unemployment relief grant, with which to fund major improvements. In addition to work on the channels, Bow Tidal Lock was duplicated, Marshgate Lock was rebuilt further east as City Mill Lock, and a second new lock at Carpenters Road was constructed. It used up-and-over radial gates operated by winches, rather than the traditional mitre gates used at City Mill Lock. The gates were quadrant-shaped, and were raised out of the river to allow boats to enter or leave the lock. An act of Parliament was obtained to authorise the work, called the River Lee (Flood Relief, &c.) Act 1930 (20 & 21 Geo. 5. c. cxcii), and work began the following year. The project was completed in 1935. Before the work, there had been a floodgate on the Waterworks River above its junction with the Three Mills Wall River, and a large pool, the City Mill Pool, connecting to the City Mills River and Saint Thomas Creek. Marshgate Lock was situated to the west of the junction between the Pudding Mill River and Saint Thomas Creek. It was originally built in 1864, by adding a second set of gates to Hunters Gates, a floodgate which had been built around 1847. The reconstructed lock was built on the site of the City Mill Pool, and had two sets of gates at its eastern end, to prevent high tidal levels in Waterworks River flooding the waterways to the west. It was labelled Marshgate Lane Lock on the 1948 map, but was called Ward Lock, after a local councillor, and is now known as City Mills Lock. The course of the Saint Thomas Creek was then straightened, and the original Marshgate Lock was bypassed. Pudding Mill River became a dead end when the lower section was filled in, as was most of the Three Mills Back River, and the floodgate on Waterworks River was also removed. Reconstruction of the channels included widening City Mill River to 50 feet (15 m), while Three Mills Wall River and Waterworks River were made twice that width.

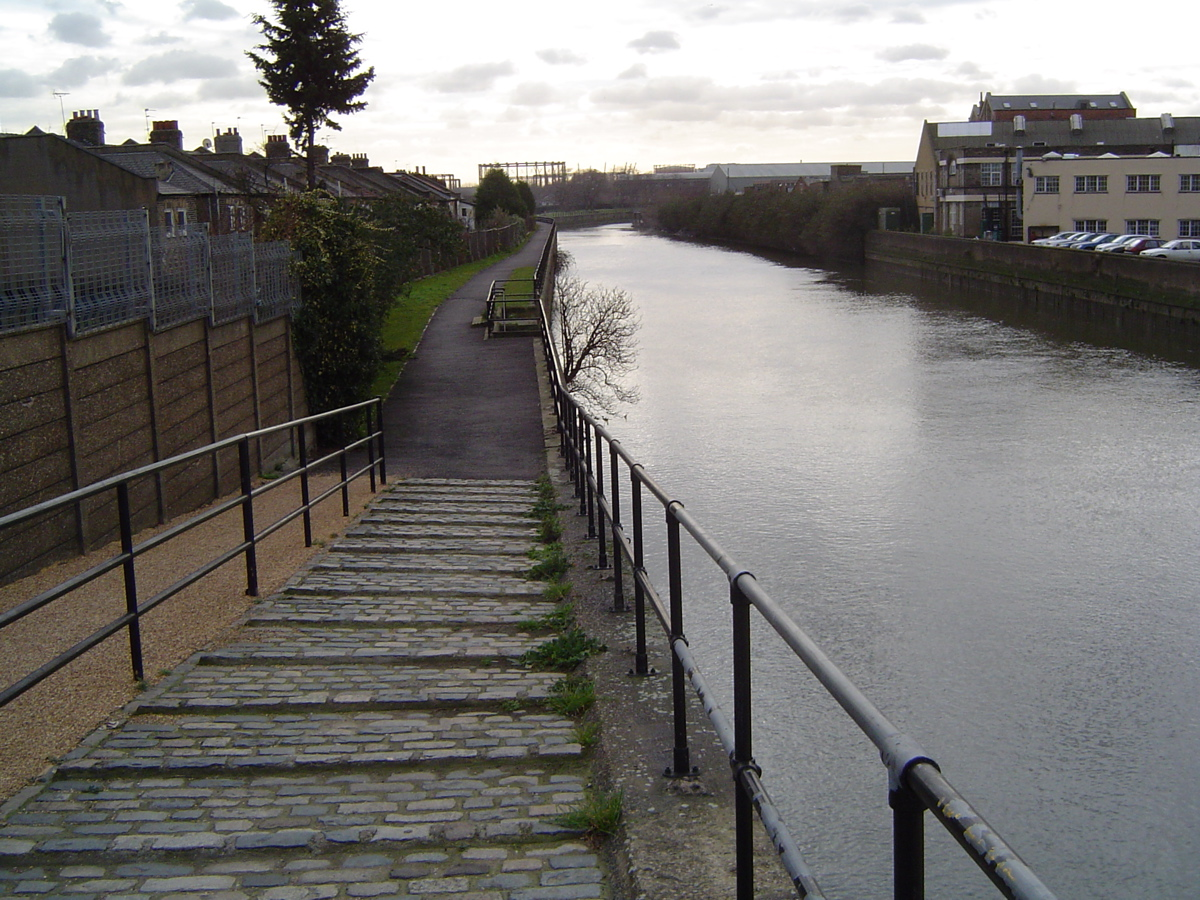
Steps going down to the tow path, used in the past by horses

Prior to the work, the arrangement had been to regulate the navigation with the Pond Lane Flood Gates and Marshgate Lane tidal lock. The new lock at Carpenter's Road gave access to the Waterworks River, providing barge access to Temple Mills. At high tides, the low headroom of the Northern Outfall Sewer aqueduct prevented access to the southern reaches of the system, and to allow access City Mill Lock was constructed near Blaker Road. In 2005, the lock was partially restored as part of the planning gain required from the developers of the adjacent Bellamy Homes housing scheme.

The 1930s improvements included the construction of the Prescott Channel, designed to allow flood water to bypass the Three Mills tide mills. The channel included sluices to regulate water levels above it, but these became redundant once the tide mills ceased to operate, and eventually seized up. They were removed soon after parts of the Channelsea River were culverted.

By the 1960s, only the Saint Thomas Creek, the City Mills River and the Channelsea River were still being used for commercial traffic. A section of the Channelsea River between Stratford High Street and Lett Road was culverted between 1957 and 1958. As traffic ceased, the lock structures deteriorated, and by 2006, City Mills Lock and Carpenters Road Lock were officially disused. The Transport Act 1968 had classified most waterways into commercial, cruising and remainder waterways. Remainder waterways were those for which the government of the time could see no economic future, and which would only therefore be subject to maintenance to prevent them becoming unsafe. The Bow Back Rivers fell into this category, and remained neglected until their full restoration was enshrined in a British Waterways policy document in 2002.

== Olympics ==
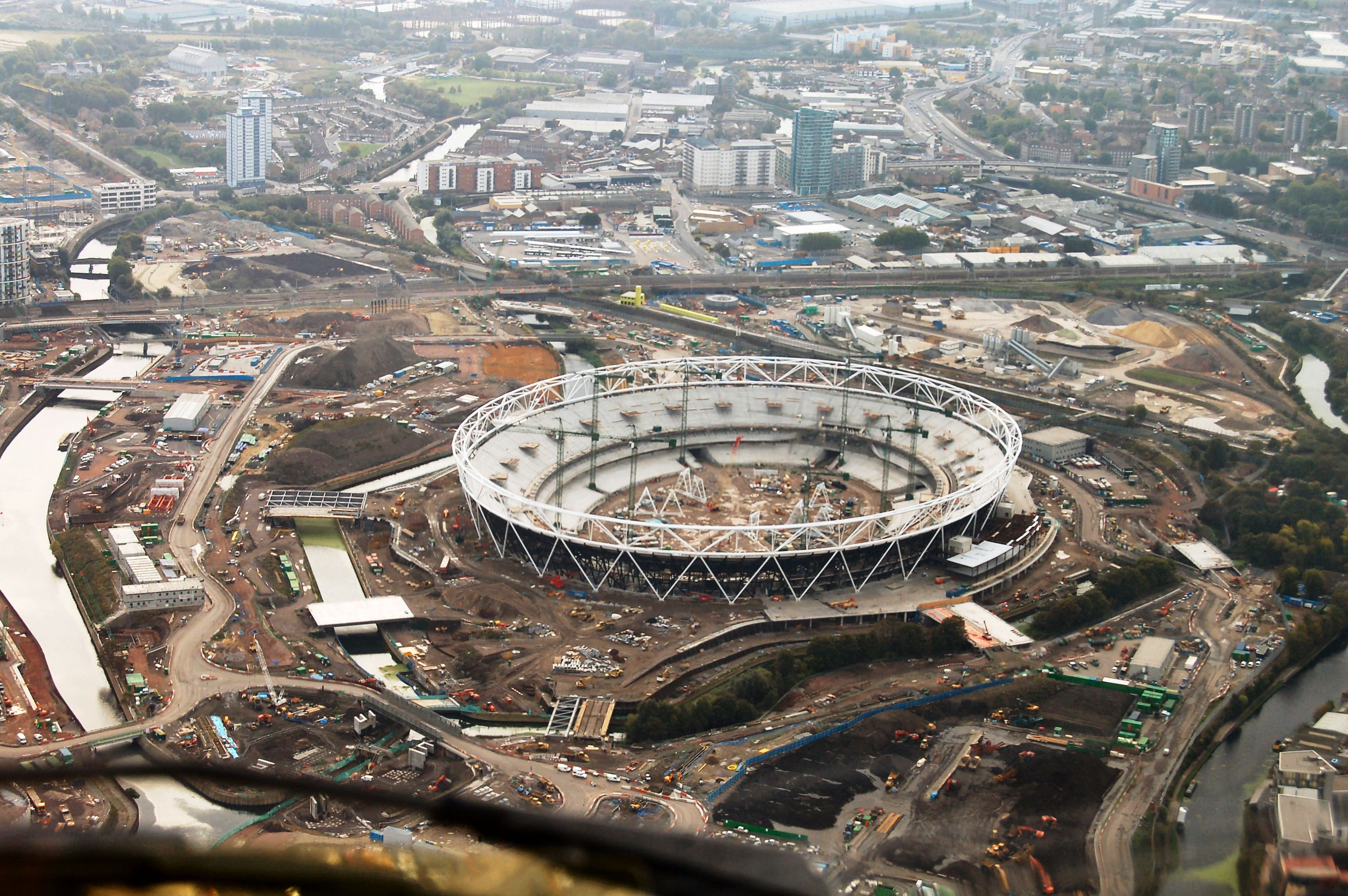
The Olympic Stadium under construction among the Bow Back Rivers. (Waterworks River and City Mill River at left, Lea Navigation at bottom right, Three Mills Wall River and Prescott Channel at top left.)

The Olympic Stadium for the London 2012 Summer Olympics is constructed on former industrial land between the Lea Navigation to the west and the City Mill River to the east. The land was formerly bisected by the remains of the Pudding Mill River, but this was filled in to provide a site which was large enough. As part of the construction phase for the event, Three Mills Lock was constructed on the Prescott Channel. This consists of a barge lock, suitable for 350-tonne (344.5-long-ton; 385.8-short-ton) barges, and an adjacent sluice, which enables the water levels above the structure to be regulated, rather than navigation being subject to the tides. The lock was built to allow construction materials to be delivered to the site and spoil to be removed, and the final cost was £23 million, which included a sluice on the Three Mills Wall River. Work began in March 2007, and the project lasted for just over two years. Despite hopes that it would transport 1.75 million tonnes while the stadium was being built, very little commercial traffic used the new lock.

With water levels above the structure remaining fairly constant, £400,000 was spent on refurbishing City Mills Lock. Although some work had been carried out in 2006, including the fitting of new metal gates, it was not operational, and had not been used for around 40 years. The second phase of restoration included fitting the equipment to automate its operation. The first public use of the lock occurred on 31 July 2010. British Waterways hoped to restore the Carpenters Road Lock soon afterwards, but the project was postponed until after the completion of the Olympic games, as temporary 'Land Bridges' were erected over the site of the lock to enable pedestrians to reach the stadium, some of which will be removed after the event. Following the Olympic games, it is hoped the waterways will continue to be used by both commercial and leisure craft.

The Olympic Delivery Authority took the decision to culvert more of the Channelsea River, where it crossed the northern part of the site. It remains a designated main river, and so they had to liaise with the Environment Agency on matters of flood-risk management, and a site was identified which would provide compensation for the loss of habitat caused by the culverting. Much of the old River Lea was inaccessible to the public prior to the project, but is a central feature of the northern parklands that have been created. Two 'wetland bowls' were designed, which have been planted with water-loving plants such as reeds, rushes, sedges and iris. They also provide spawning grounds and refuges during flood conditions for fish, as well as providing storage capacity for flood water. It was the largest aquatic planting scheme ever carried out in Britain when it was completed, and most of the 350,000 plants were grown in Norfolk from seeds and cuttings removed from the site. At the southern end of the site, the Waterworks River was reconstructed. Improvements in the 1930s created channels with vertical concrete sides, and little thought for habitat. The channel was made 26 feet (8 m) wider, with sloping banks and ramps down to the water's edge, and was improved visually and ecologically by the planting of aquatic marginal plants.

Following the Olympics, there was extremely limited access to the waterways through the Queen Elizabeth Olympic Park, and reconstruction of Carpenters Road Lock was delayed. However, the £1.8 million project to rebuild it and fit new radial gates was almost completed by May 2017, when the new gates were craned into position. The Heritage Lottery Fund provided £680,000 towards the cost of the project, with other grants coming from the London Legacy Development Corporation and the Inland Waterways Association. As well as acting as a lock, the radial gates allow water to be distributed around the Bow Back Rivers for flood prevention purposes. The gates were due to be tested during the summer months, with a formal opening scheduled for the East London Waterways Festival in August. Public access to the waterways around the Olympic Stadium was also due to begin in June or July.

== Locks ==
The locks on the Bow Back Rivers are not built to a single standard, and sizes vary.

Lock	configuration	length	width	notes
Bow Tidal	twin	93.5 feet (28.5 m)	20 feet (6.1 m)	Built 1900 and 1931
Carpenters Road	single	92 feet (28 m)	20 feet (6.1 m)	Built 1933, rising radial gates, reopened 2017
City Mills	single	95 feet (29 m)	20 feet (6.1 m)	Built 1933, reopened 2010
Marshgate	single			Built 1864, removed 1935
Old Ford	twin	90 feet (27 m)	18.5 feet (5.6 m)	Built 1902 and 1935
Three Mills	single	203 feet (62 m)	26 feet (8 m)	Built 2009, hydraulic sector gates

== Points of interest ==
Point	Coordinates (Links to map resources)	OS Grid Ref	Notes
Middlesex Filter Beds Weir	51.5618°N 0.0444°W	TQ356865	
Jn with River Lee Flood Relief Channel	51.5616°N 0.0302°W	TQ366865	
Start of Channelsea River	51.5438°N 0.0161°W	TQ376846	Bully Fence
Carpenters Road Lock	51.5420°N 0.0164°W	TQ376844	Awaiting repair
Old Ford	51.5377°N 0.0205°W	TQ373839	End of Old River Lea
City Mill Lock	51.5333°N 0.0092°W	TQ381834	Reopened 2011
Three Mills Lock	51.5273°N 0.0041°W	TQ385828	Opened 2009
Bow Tidal Lock	51.5231°N 0.0081°W	TQ382823	
Mouth of Bow Creek	51.5074°N 0.0094°E	TQ395806	Jn with River Thames

== See also ==
- Rivers of the United Kingdom
