= Prescott Channel =

Canal in East London, England

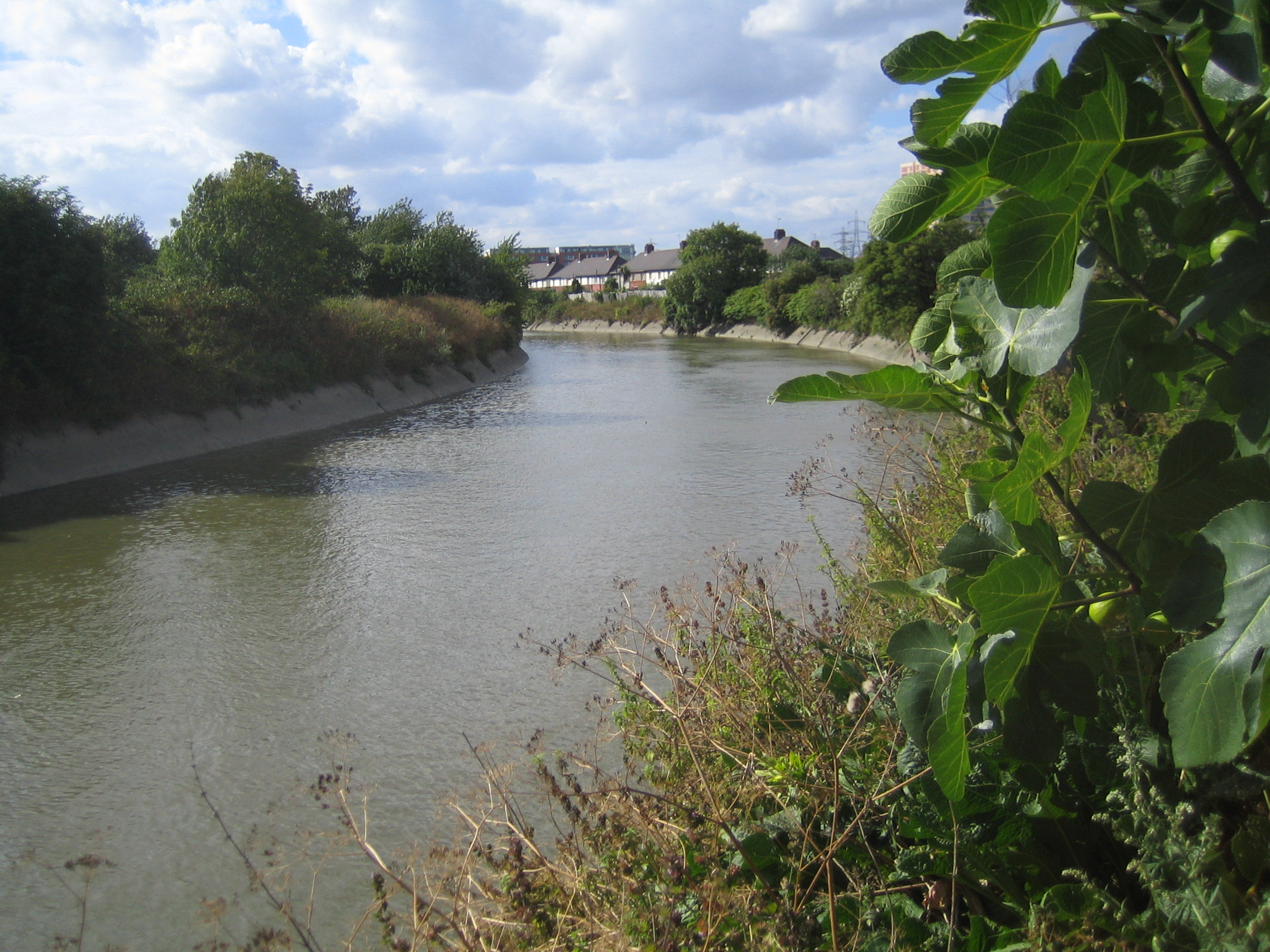
- Prescott Channel in July 2006

Specifications
- Locks: 1
- Status: Open
- Navigation authority: Canal & River Trust

History
- Date of act: 1930
- Date closed: 1960s
- Date restored: 2009

Geography
- Connects to: Bow Back Rivers

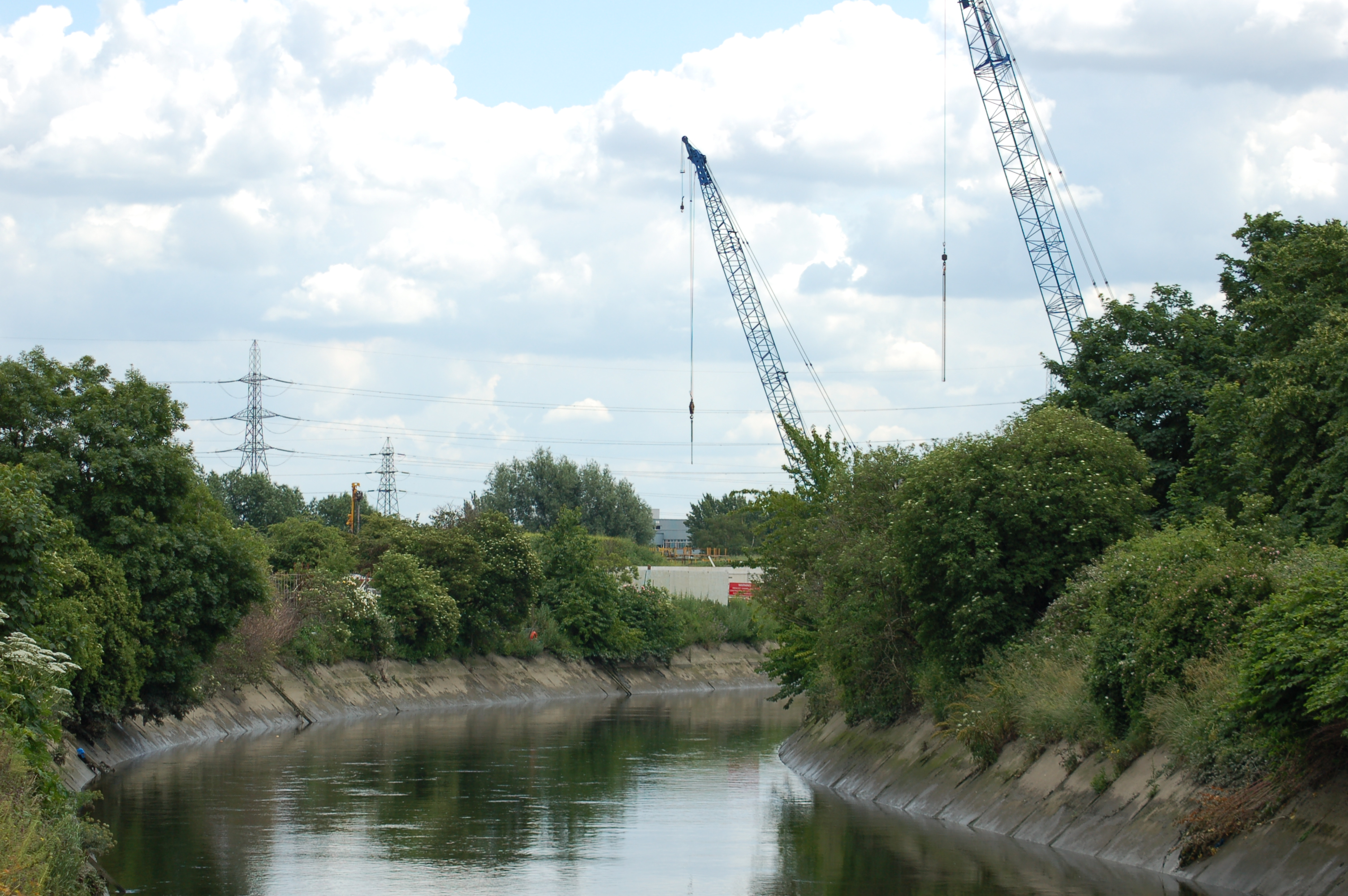
The cranes mark the construction site of the Three Mills Lock.

The Prescott Channel was built in 1930–35 as part of a flood relief scheme for the River Lee Navigation in the County Borough of West Ham, England, and was named after Sir William Prescott, the then chairman of the Lee Conservancy Board. Rubble from the demolished Euston Arch was used in 1962 to improve the channel, which forms part of the Bow Back Rivers.

== Details ==
Three Mills Lock is a lock in the channel to allow passage of freight for the London 2012 Olympics by a process of canalisation (with the result of stopping the tidal flow) on the channel and the River Lee northwards. It was constructed between March 2007 and June 2009. Additional benefits credited to the project include the potential for leisure boats to use the Bow Back Rivers at all times. A major benefit for British Waterways was the increased value of the land which it holds in areas no longer subject to flooding, which it was expected would exceed the cost of the project.

The lock is 62 metres long, 8 metres wide and 2.4 metres deep, and can hold two 350 tonne barges (other locks on the Lower Lee limited barges to about 120 tonnes). It was designed by Tony Gee and Partners and built by Volker Stevin.

On 2 June 2008, work on the channel brought up a 2,200-pound (1 t) Hermann Second World War time bomb. Residents were evacuated, tube and rail services were disrupted, and flights from London City Airport were curtailed during the emergency. The 67-year-old, booby-trapped bomb was finally made safe, after five days, in a controlled explosion that threw 400 tonnes of sand into the air. Major Matt Davies, of the Army Bomb disposal unit said "If it had gone off in wartime there would have been large fragments up to a mile away which could have destroyed buildings and sewers". He added "This is the biggest unexploded bomb we have found in central London."

In 2009, again as part of the project to build the lock, 29 stones from the Euston Arch were raised from the river bed and presented to the Euston Arch Trust. One stone had already been salvaged in 1994 by Dan Cruickshank, as part of a BBC Television programme called One Foot in the Past.

== Criticisms of canalisation ==
Three Mills Lock was delivered ten months behind the planned schedule, which severely limited its usefulness to the builders of the various Olympic Park venues. A further planned use was for the delivery of materials for the Crossrail project. However the lock has in fact rarely been used by freight barges.

In August 2013, a long period of hot dry weather followed by heavy rain washed polluted road run-off water into the Lower Lea, causing deoxygenation of the water. The role of the canalisation of the Bow Back Rivers in and around the Olympic Park, with its consequences for tidal flow have been implicated in the considerable levels of fish kill which resulted from the incident.

== See also ==
- Canals of the United Kingdom
- History of the British canal system
- Three Mills Residential Moorings

== Other sources ==
- East London Record, No. 18 (1996)

== Geo links for Prescott Channel ==
- 51.527262°N 0.00398°W
