= Three Mills =

Mills and island in London, England

Coordinates: 51.5273°N 0.0075°W

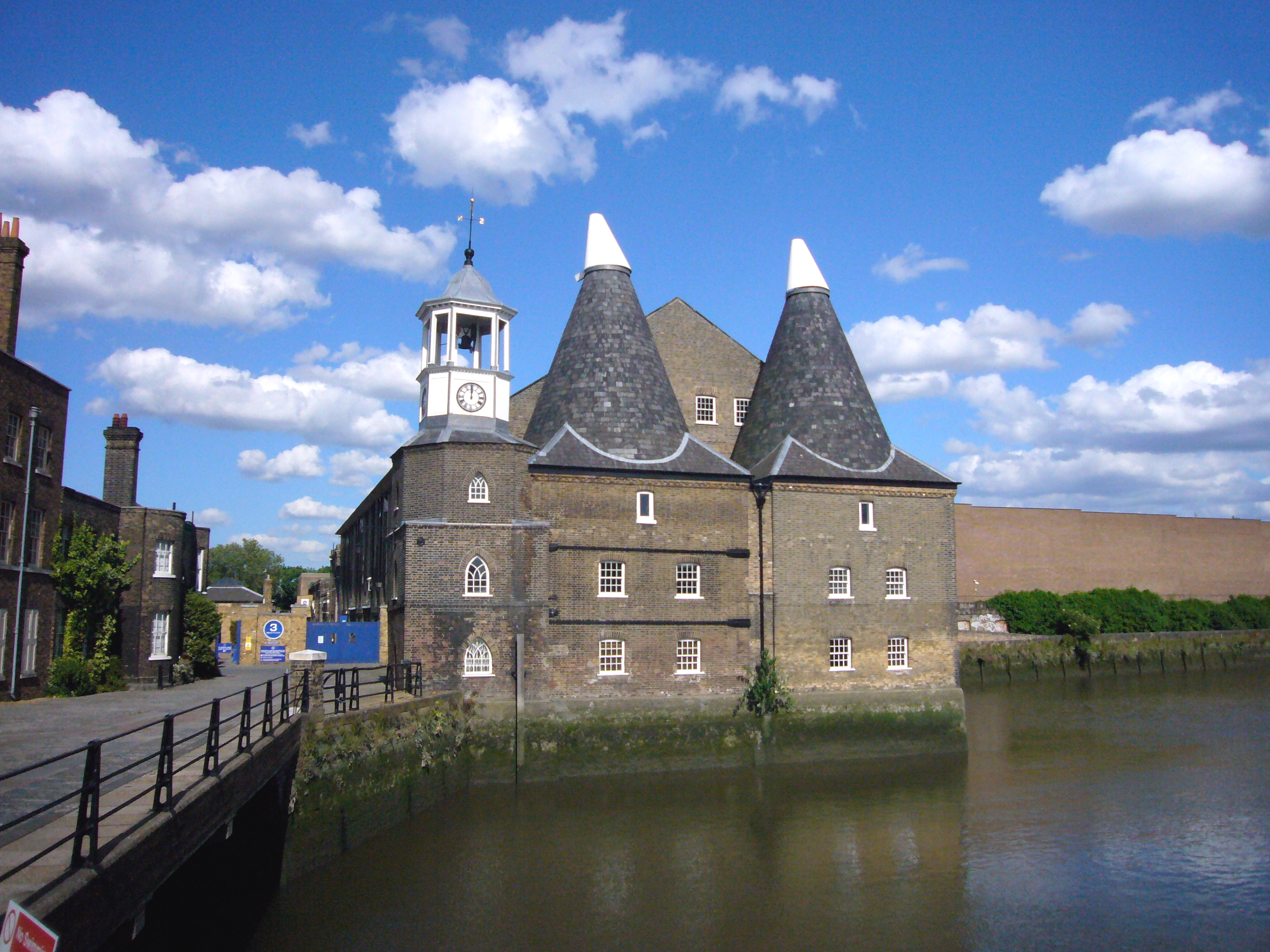
- The Clock Mill at Three Mills

- Location within Greater London
- London borough: Newham
- Ceremonial county: Greater London
- Region: London
- Country: England
- Sovereign state: United Kingdom
- Post town: LONDON
- Postcode district: E3
- Dialling code: 020
- Police: Metropolitan
- Fire: London
- Ambulance: London
- London Assembly: City and East

The Three Mills are former working mills and an island of the same name on the River Lea. It is one of London’s oldest surviving industrial centres. The mills lie in the London Borough of Newham, but despite lying on the Newham side of the Lea, access is principally from the western, London Borough of Tower Hamlets, side of the river.

The River Lea Tidal Mill Trust Ltd owns the House Mill and the Miller's House buildings, which are used for educational projects and as conference spaces. The Lower Lea Project is also based at Three Mills in The Miller's House.

== History ==
It is thought that there were eight or possibly nine mills on the River Lea in Stratford at the time of the Domesday Book, though this number may refer to the number of pairs of millstones rather than buildings. These are the earliest recorded examples of a tidal mill system. In the clock mill there were 16 workers.

Stratford Langthorne Abbey, founded in 1135, acquired Three Mills some time in the 12th or 13th centuries, and the local area became known by the name. By the time Henry VIII dissolved the abbey in the 1530s, the mills were grinding flour for the bakers of Stratford-atte-Bow, who were celebrated for the quality of their bread and who supplied the huge City of London market.

In 1588, one of the mills was described as a "gunpowder mill". During the 16th century the three mills were reduced to two (which today are the House Mill and the Clock Mill). In the 17th century, the mills were used to grind grain, which was then used to distill alcohol; the mills became a major supplier to the alcohol trade and gin palaces of London. Peter Lefebure began distilling gin at Three Mills in about 1730.

The House Mill was built in 1776 (and after a fire destroyed it, quickly rebuilt) by Daniel Bisson. It is a grade I listed building. The Clock Mill was rebuilt by Philip Metcalfe between 1815 and 1817 incorporating the old clock, and an older bell. There was also a windmill which survived until about 1840. The House Mill continued to operate until 1940 and the Clock Mill until 1952.

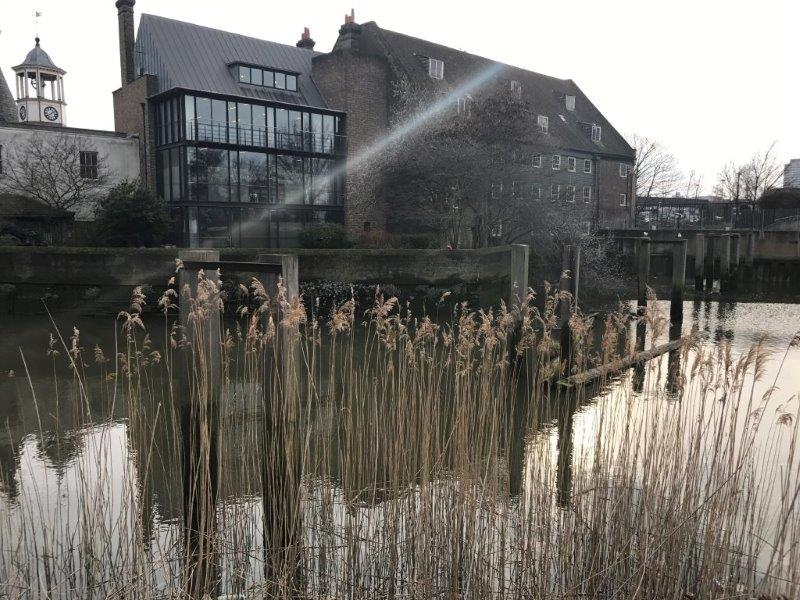
House Mill from across the water

Ownership changed relatively frequently during the 17th to the late 19th centuries, until 1872 when it was purchased by gin distillers J&W Nicholson & Co of Clerkenwell. Initially producing Lamplighter Gin on site, the company eventually moved production of all of their brands to the site. Distilling ceased in 1941 during the rationing shortages of World War II. The Nicholson family, headed by Sir Richard Nicholson, sold the business to the Distillers Company.

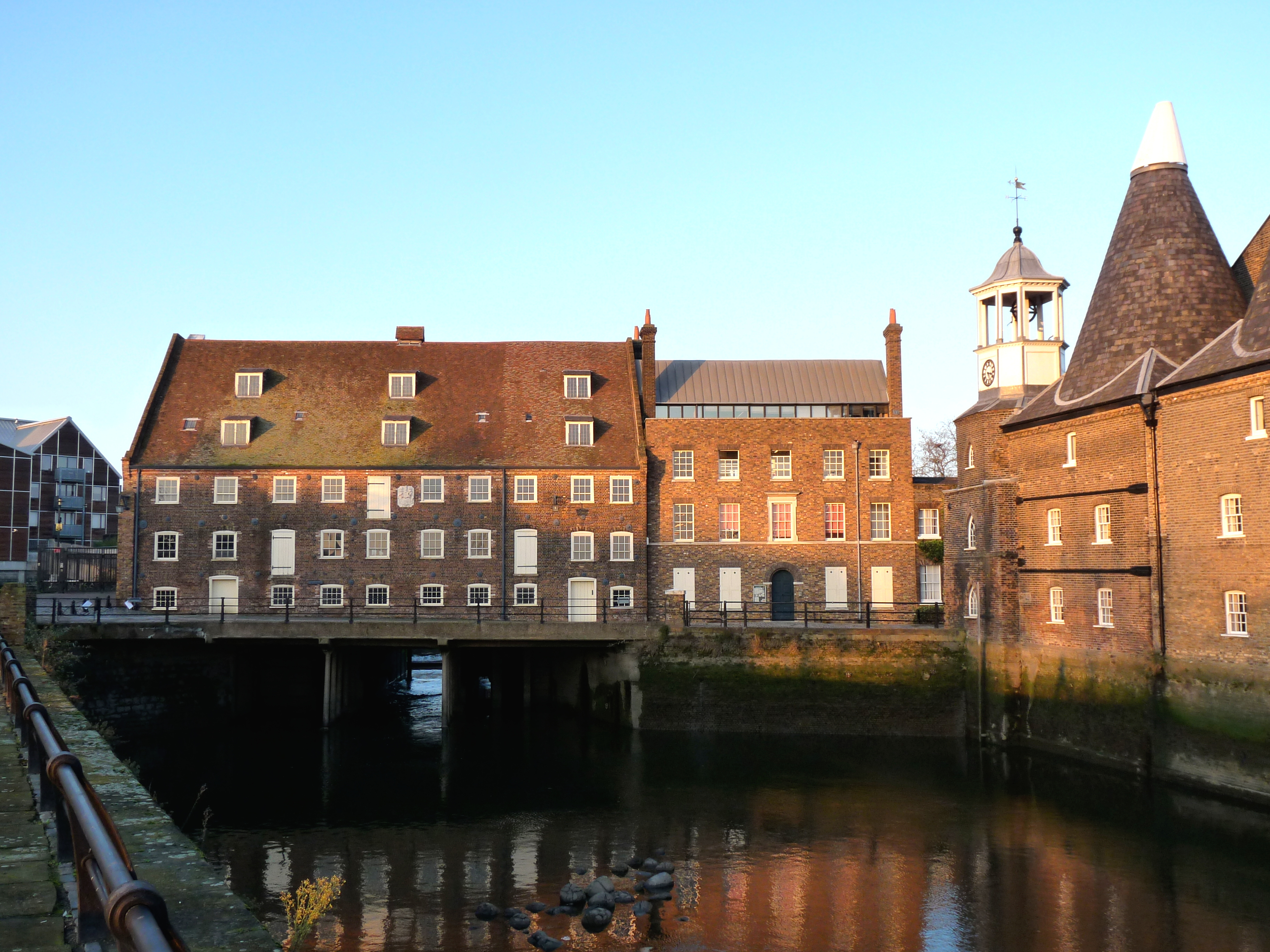
House Mill and the Miller's House at low tide

=== Reaching Out ===
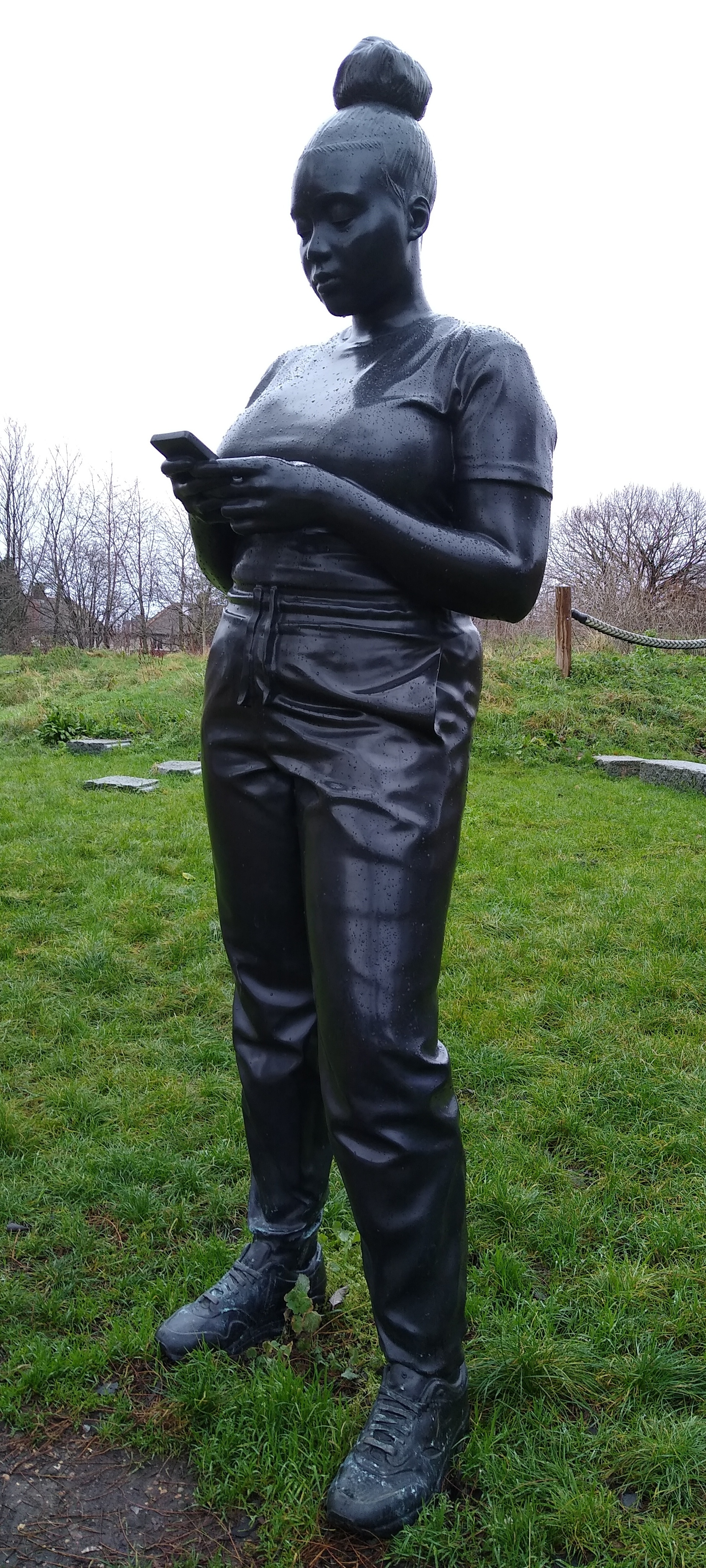
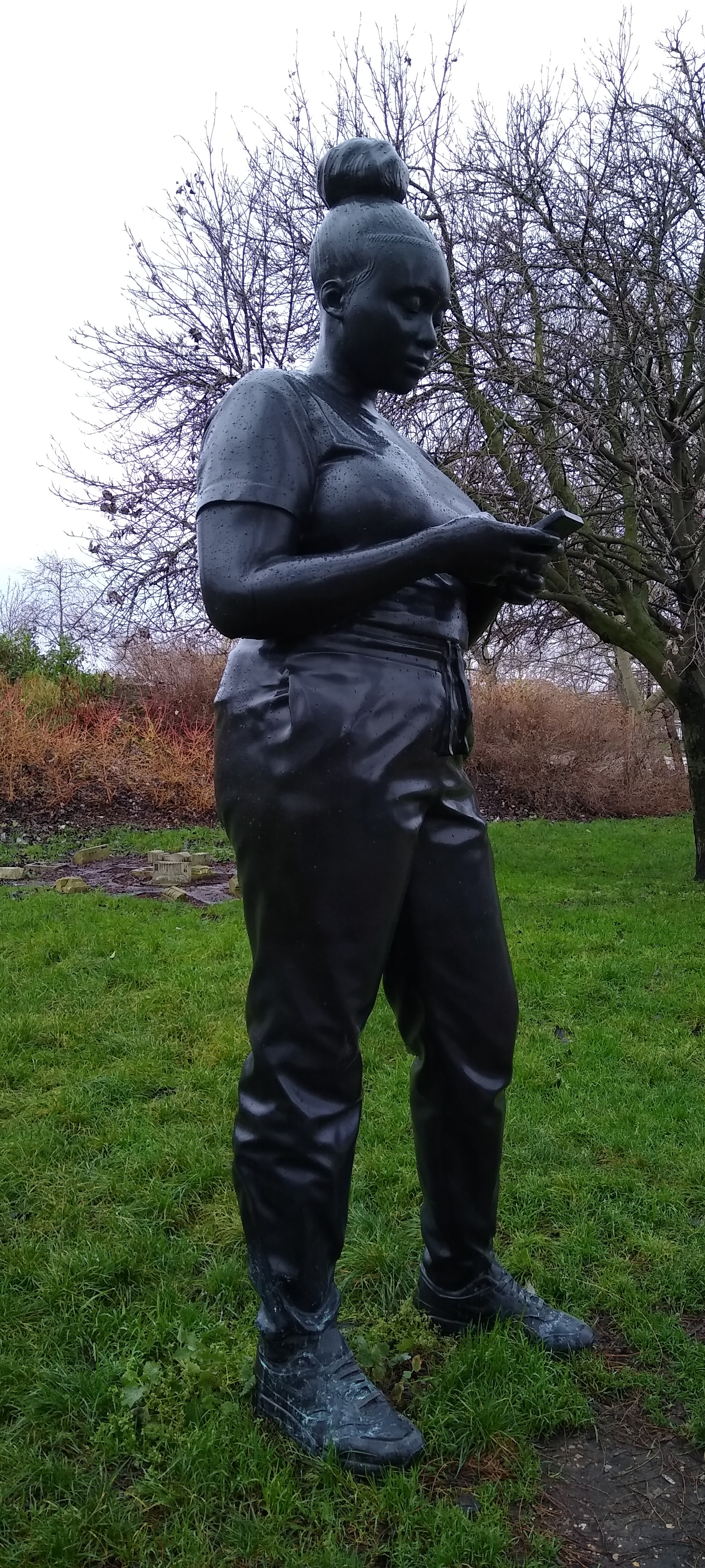
Reaching Out, on Three Mills Island

Three Mills sustained severe air-raid damage during the Second World War. The Miller's House was destroyed in 1941 and rebuilt in 1995 with a modern interior and rear part, but retaining the original facade. Three Mills was used for bottling and warehousing by Bass Charrington and Hedges & Butler. The latter, one of the oldest wine merchants in Britain located their main working offices at Three Mills. Here, Bacardi was bottled and a large portfolio of wines and spirits was marketed.

The House Mill remains the largest tidal mill in the world, although the water wheels are currently not in operation. The building is owned by The River Lea Tidal Mill Trust Ltd and is open to visitors on Sunday afternoons during the summer. It is one of only four Grade I listed buildings in the London Borough of Newham.

The creation of the Three Mills Lock on the Prescott Channel and the Three Mills Wall River Weir, for the 2012 Summer Olympics construction work, has created a head of water behind the mill. This may mean that it can be operated again although it has partially removed the tidal benefits of the site.

The Clock Mill is the temporary site of Harris Science Academy East London.

In 2017, J&W Nicholson re-launched the gin brand which was launched in 1736 as Nicholson Gin.

== Three Mills Island ==
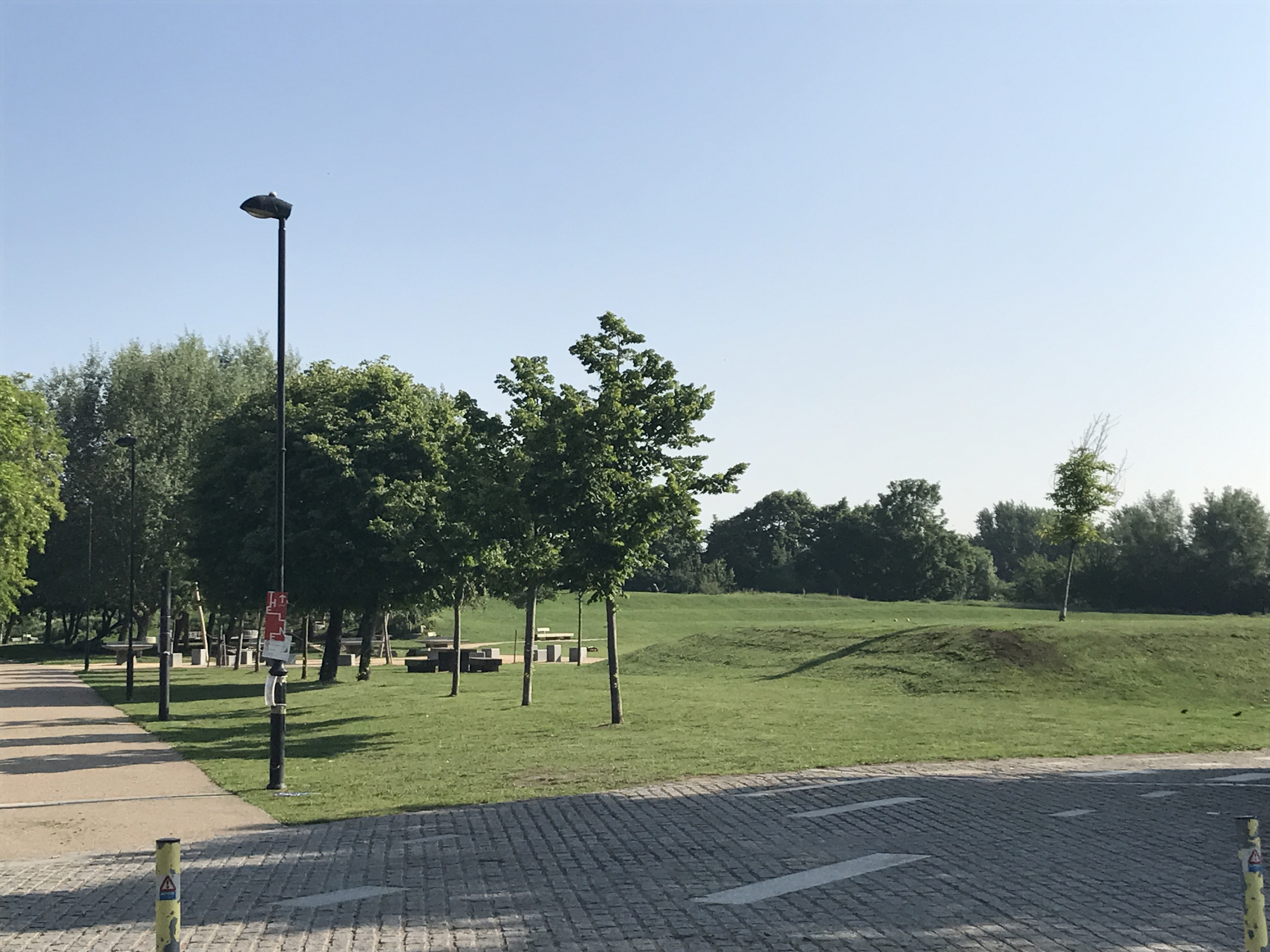
Three Mills Green and open playspace on Three Mills Island

Three Mills Island is in Bromley-by-Bow in east London. It forms part of the 50-mile Lea Valley Walk.

The Prescott Channel, a former flood relief channel passes to the east, making the land an island. The mills share Three Mills Island with the 3 Mills Studios, a 10-acre film and TV studio, which makes a large number of major films and television programmes and an open green and play area called Three Mills Green.

The 26-acre area of land opposite the mills, shown in historical surveys as the Three Mills District, once housed a large cooperage producing barrels to support the mills, as well as a wide range of industries, from the manufacture of innovative inks to sugar refining. Called Sugar House Island, the development is being delivered by Vastint and is expected bring 2,500 jobs to the area, with a new business district as well as waterside homes and amenities. Construction was expected for completion in 2024.

== Operation ==
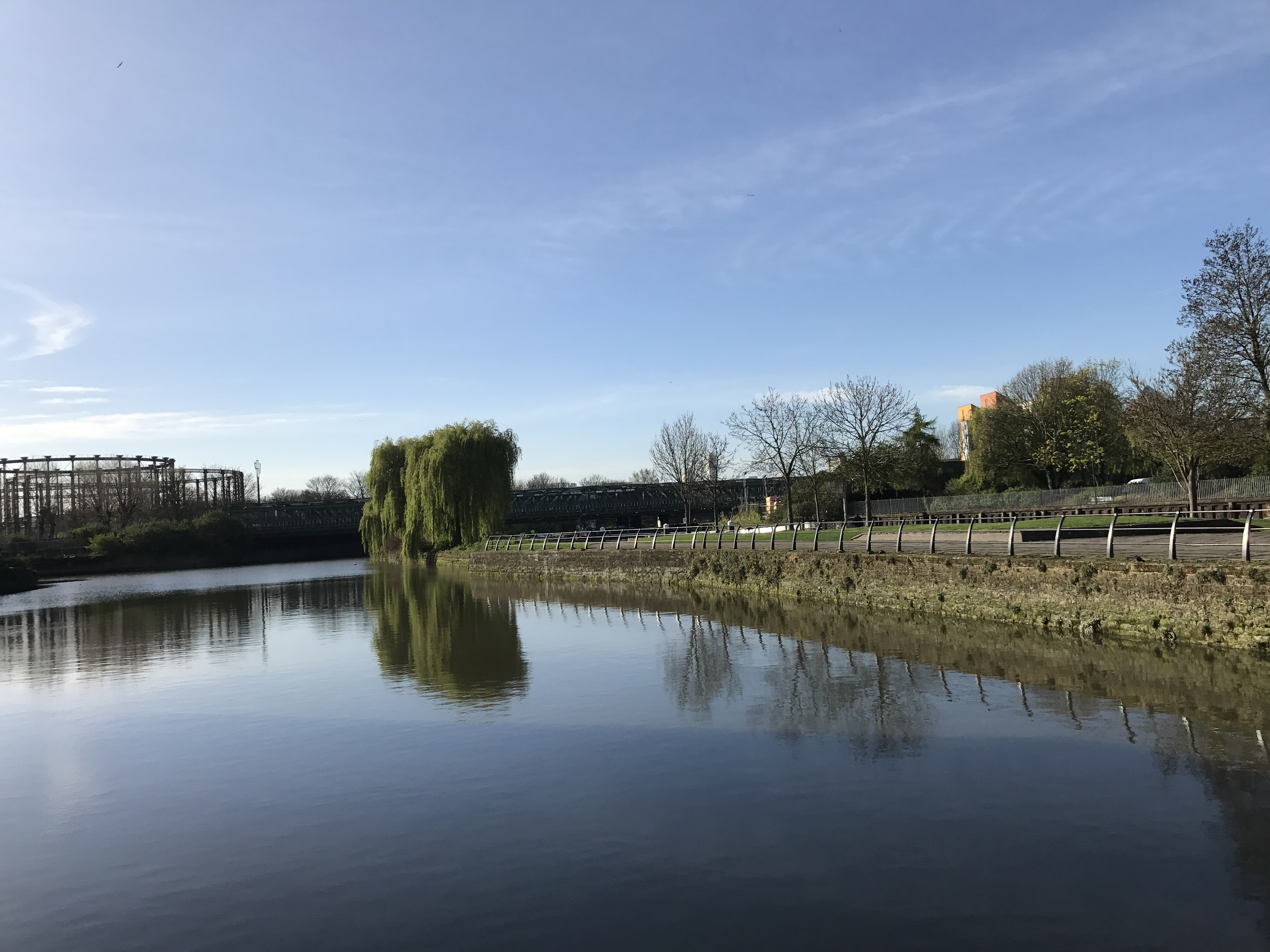
Three Mills Lane

In 1878 there were seven waterwheels at Three Mills. Most of them were around 20 ft in diameter and 3 ft in width, but one was 8 ft in width. There were four in the House Mill and three in the Clock Mill. They drove fourteen pairs of millstones and produced a total of 150 HP (112KW). The average output of the House Mill was about 2 tons of maize and 5 tons of barley per tide rising to 10 and 14 tons respectively on spring tides. The average weekly throughput of the two mills was 125 tons per week.

Clock Mill was powered by three iron undershot water wheels, two of 6.1m diameter and one of 5.9m diameter. These wheels drove six pairs of millstones at 130 revolutions per minute. This mill operated until 1952. When the mills were both operating in 1938, the site employed one millwright and four carpenters. During the daily 7–8 hours of tidal power, the water wheels ran at 16 revolutions per minute with a working head of 3.0-3.7m. This produced some 7-9 kW to turn each millstone.
