= House Mill =

Tide mill in Bromley-by-Bow, London, England

Coordinates: 51.5274°N 0.0079°W

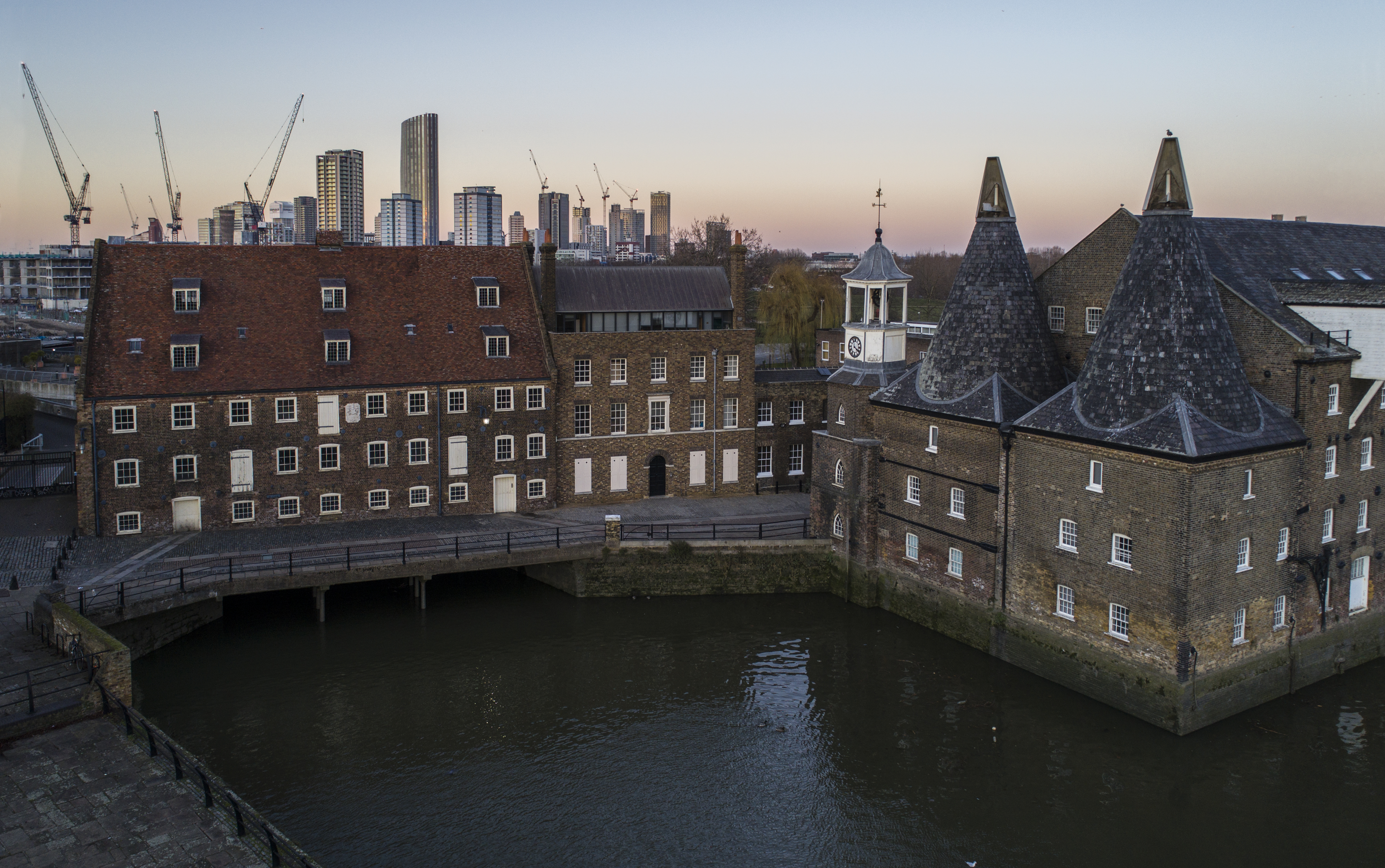
The House Mill from the mill basin

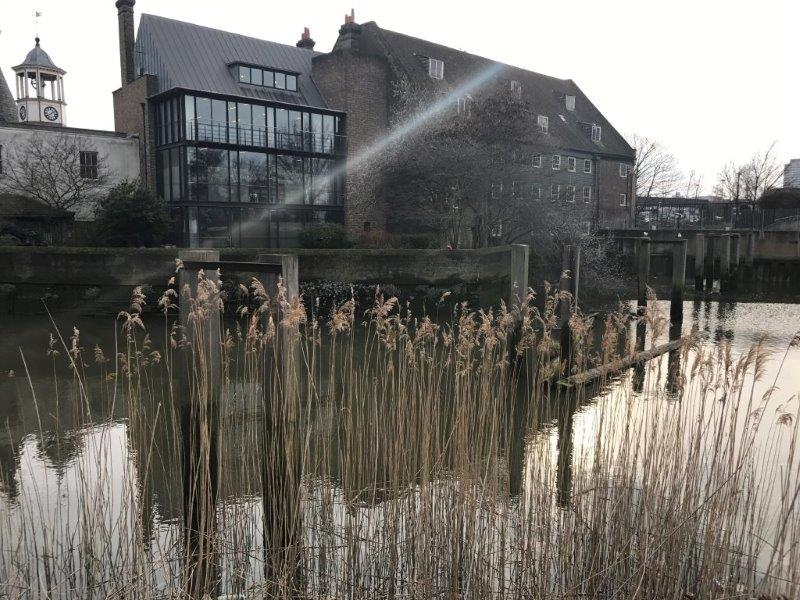
House Mill as seen from Sugar House Island

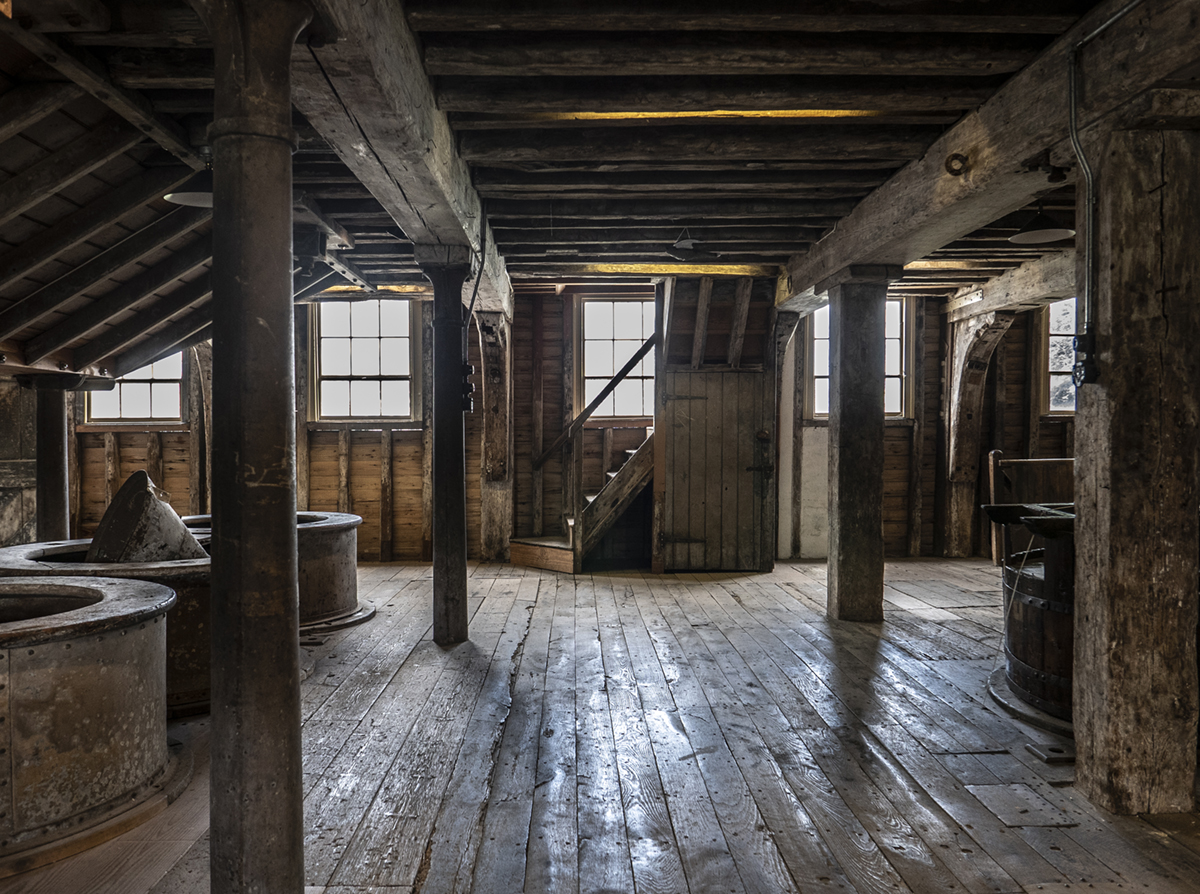
The House Mill interior

House Mill is a former tide mill in East London, England. It is located on the River Lea in Mill Meads, and is part of the Three Mills complex. Because of its architectural merit, it is a Grade I listed building. The original tidal mills at this site were recorded in the Domesday Book of 1086, and were owned by Stratford Langthorne Abbey until the Reformation of the 16th century. The present structure of the House Mill was built in 1776 by Daniel Bisson. It was damaged by fire in 1802, and then rebuilt by Philip Metcalfe.

The House Mill is thought to be the "largest tidal mill standing in Britain". Much of its original machinery is still in situ, including four waterwheels, three of which are 20 feet (6.1 m) in diameter and one is 19 feet (5.8 m). Three of them are 3 feet (0.9 m) wide and would have produced around 20 to 25 horsepower (15 to 19 kW) while the one at the western end of the building is 8 feet (2.4 m) wide and would have produced around 40 to 45 horsepower (30 to 34 kW), but they are no longer operational.

The building has three storeys, and a steeply pitched slate roof, in which there are two more storeys. Most of it is constructed of timber, although the floor of the ground floor is made of concrete, and there are some cast iron supporting pillars. The south facade of the House Mill displays a coat of arms dated 1776 and the initials "DSB" (which could be Daniel and Sarah Bisson), with forty cast iron wall plates which tie the ends of the floor beams.

The Miller's House was rebuilt in 1995 with a modern interior, but retaining the original facade. The Miller's House and a house on the other side of the House Mill were originally built for the Miller and his family. A Second World War bomb landed on a nearby bonded warehouse and damaged both houses on 15 October 1940 which were later demolished. The Mill stopped operating and was used as a warehouse.

== Publications ==
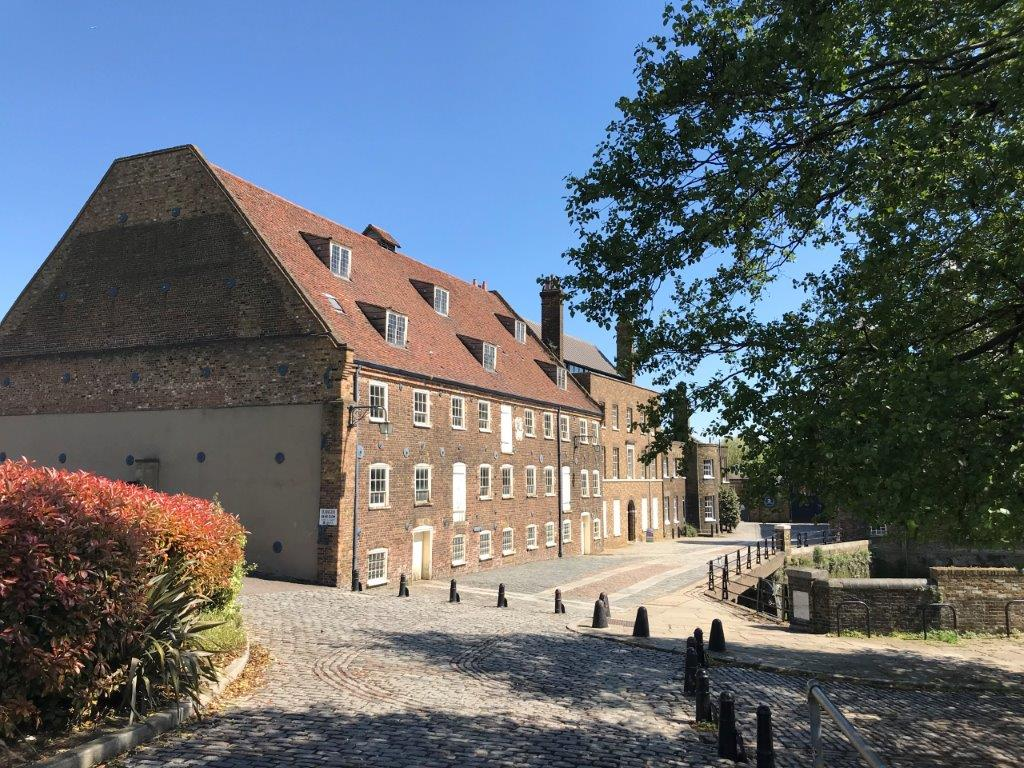
House Mill facade on Three Mill Lane

The following are research papers published by the House Mill (River Lea Tidal Mill Trust Ltd).

- The Three Mills Distillery in the Georgian era by Keith Fairclough (2003) ISBN 0-9544094-4-2
- The LeFevre family and distilling along the Lower Lea by Keith Fairclough (2003) ISBN 0-9544094-5-0
- Owners of the Three Mills (1539–1728) by Keith Fairclough (2003) ISBN 0-9544094-3-4
- Philip Metcalfe (1733–1818), the MP and industrialist who built the Clock Mill by Keith Fairclough (2003) ISBN 0-9544094-7-7
- The Bisson Family of Three Mills by Keith Fairclough and Brian Strong (2003) ISBN 0-9544094-6-9
