= Carpenters Estate =

Housing estate in Stratford, London

Coordinates: 51.53855°N 0.00448°W

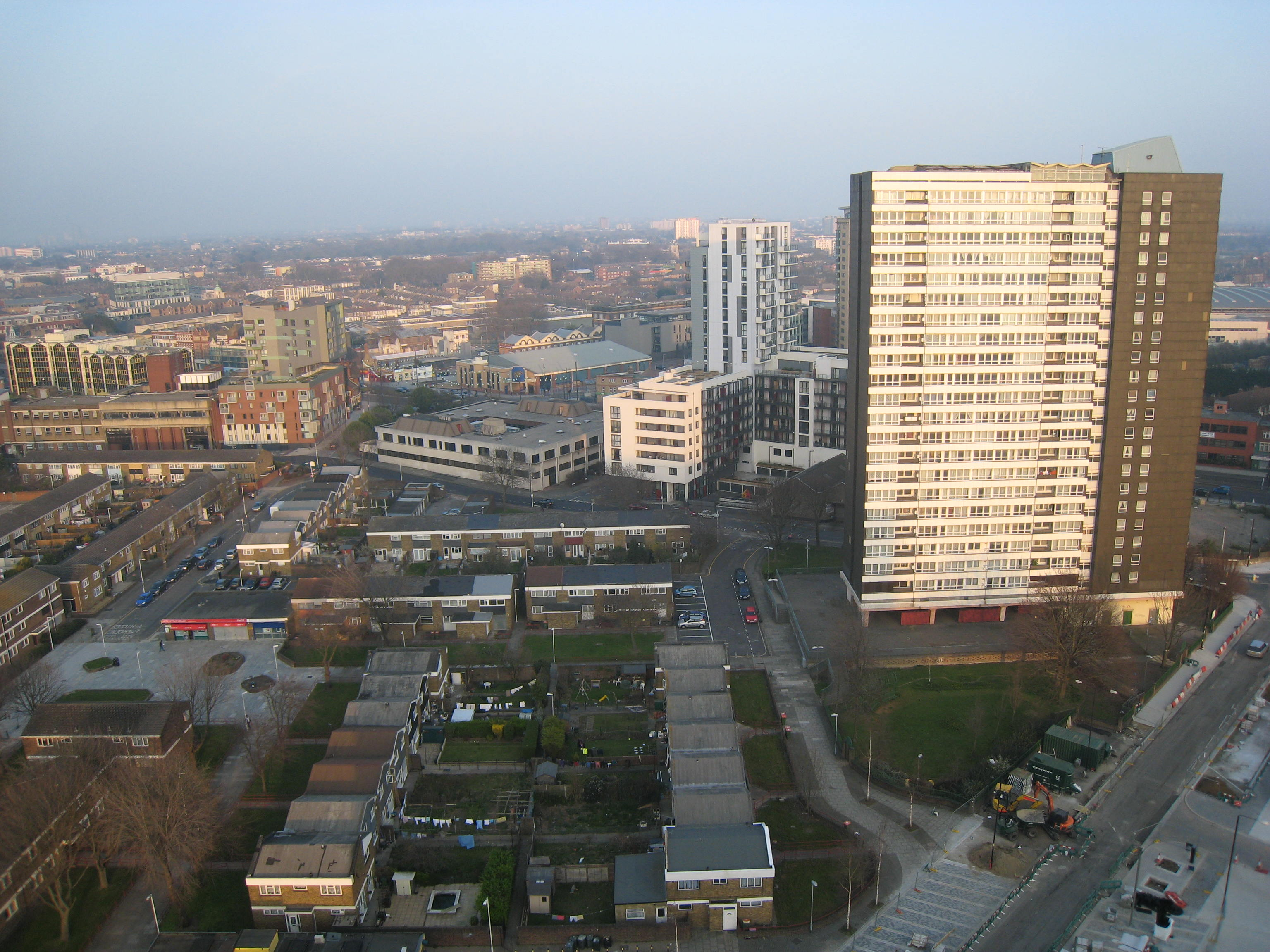
- Interactive map of Carpenters Estate

General information
- Location: Stratford
- Area: London Borough of Newham
- No. of blocks: 3

Construction
- Constructed: 1967

Other information
- Governing body: Newham Council
- Famous residents: Funky DL

The Carpenters Estate is located in Stratford, Newham, East London, close to the Queen Elizabeth Olympic Park. The estate is formed of low rise social housing and three tower blocks. The estate has been continually earmarked for demolition and redevelopment.

== History ==
Carpenters Estate is located in the London Borough of Newham. The estate's name originates from The Worshipful Company of Carpenters, an ancient London livery company, which in the late 19th century bought what was farmland in West Ham for industrial development. Many of London's factories were built on the canals of the River Lea, the railroads, and Carpenters Road in the following decades. To house the workers for these factories, the Company of Carpenters built rows of Victorian terraced houses between Carpenters Road and the neighbouring town centre of Stratford. The company made efforts to improve the lives of the area's employees and residents, including the creation of a school and a social club.

However, during the Second World War, Stratford was a frequent target for air raids, and by the end of the war much of the Carpenters Estate housing had been destroyed or was badly damaged. The area had large bombsites and semi demolished houses still standing until the mid-1950s. The housing stock was very substandard, old and poorly built, very small with no bathrooms only tin baths, outside toilets, pervasive damp with endemic mice and bed bugs, only gas lighting with no electricity until about 1953 and most only had coal fires for heating adding to the smog. Rent controls meant no money was spent for improvements. The area suffered from thick and long lasting smogs from industrial pollutants from the factories and the steam trains at Stratford station, respiratory diseases were extremely common. The area had a stench from the factories, especially paint, glue varnish, chemicals and meat processing. The community was a strong cockney one. The entire estate was demolished by the council under slum clearance in 1966. The present estate was built in 1967, combining low rise housing (Doran Walk) and three tower blocks:

- James Riley Point
- Lund Point
- Dennison Point.

The estate also contains a school, college and some businesses.

== Redevelopment ==
The estate has been subject to plans for refurbishment and redevelopment going back to 2001. In 2004, Newham Council stated that "the estate was falling into disrepair and needed significant improvement work to bring it up to a modern standard and maintain it", but that "after analysing costs, it was clear that this would be an expensive process costing up to £25 million per tower". The process of emptying James Riley Point commenced in 2004, however, funding to continue the refurbishment of this and the remaining two blocks was considered too expensive by the Greater London Authority. Following a public meeting in 2008, the Council recommended the demolition of the remaining tower blocks and some smaller blocks on Doran Walk.

As Newham redeveloped parts of Stratford for the 2012 Olympic Games, the future of the estate was once again under the spotlight given its proximity to the Olympic Park and plans being led by then Mayor of Newham Robin Wales for University College London to build a new campus. However, in May 2013, the campus plan had fallen through. A 2013 research study on the effects of the Olympics on regeneration in East London noted that more than half of the residents had been decanted from the estate by September 2012.

=== Focus E15 ===
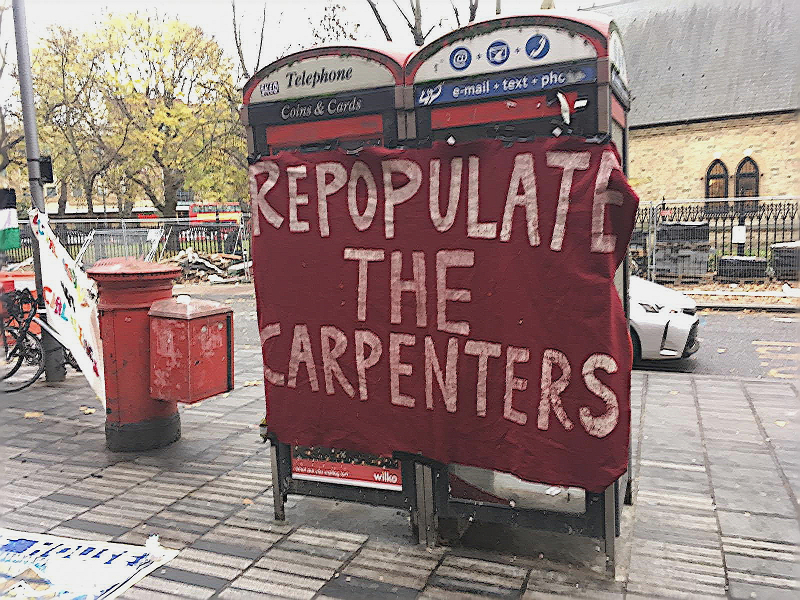
'Repopulate the Carpenters' banner on phone boxes at the Focus E15 street stall

Focus E15 was formed in September 2013 by a group of young mothers campaigning for housing rights - they themselves having faced eviction from a Newham hostel due to funding being withdrawn. In June 2014, Focus E15 staged a protest at the Carpenters Estate over the ongoing social housing problems in the borough. Both the group and the plight of the estate was brought to wider attention when on 23 September 2014, they occupied one of the empty low-rise blocks on the estate to provide a social centre. The occupation came to an end on 7 October when the group agreed to leave the flats after the Council issued legal and eviction notices. A dispute between Focus E15 and Mayor Wales would proceed to wage for some months.

Focus E15 continue to campaign and highlight social housing problems in the borough including the ongoing battle over the Carpenters.

=== Renewed Plans ===
In November 2015, Newham Council re-avowed their commitment to demolish and redevelop the estate, whilst the Greater Carpenters Neighbourhood Forum persisted in their calls for both its refurbishment instead and better engagement with local residents. In August 2017, the council announced the commencing of a tendering process to enlist a developer to undertake the estate redevelopment, however, in November 2018 it was announced by the Mayor of Newham that this had been shelved, with new promises that any redevelopment would be "led by residents and include a minimum of 50 percent affordable homes".

In November 2021, Newham commenced the formal regeneration project for the estate, beginning with a ballot of residents on the 19 November.

== In popular culture ==
In 2010, scenes from the science-fiction film Attack the Block were filmed on the estate, featuring locals as extras.

In 2018, scenes from the surveillance thriller The Capture were filmed in the Carpenter's Arms, a local pub on the estate.

In 2018, the Blueprint Theatre Company staged a production of a new work at Rich Mix in Shoreditch called Legacy, which highlighted the issue of social cleansing in the area. Based loosely on the story of Mary Finch, a local activist who had refused to leave her flat on the estate, the play examined an extended family living at the Carpenters' who fight back when faced with the possibility of eviction and relocation after the council and developers begin planning a regeneration of Newham in order to prove the positive legacy created by the London 2012 Olympics. The production followed extensive research and interviews with local residents and rehearsed readings at Theatre Royal Stratford East and Rich Mix. It was written by Sally Grey and Susan Avery, directed by Tracy O'Flaherty, and starred Shenagh Govan, Sally Grey, Nicholas Khan, Adam Elms, Katie Males, and Jacqui Gray.

British producer and rapper Funky DL released the 2018 album Dennison Point, recalling his time as a young child living in the block.
