= LUNG (theatre company) =

- Formation: 2014
- Type: Theatre group
- Artistic director(s): Matt Woodhead and Helen Monks
- Website: www.lungtheatre.co.uk

LUNG is a national touring, Verbatim theatre company. Founded in Barnsley, England, in 2014, LUNG is campaign-led and uses real life stories to shine a light on political issues in the UK. All of LUNG's plays are published with Bloomsbury. The company is led by co-artistic directors Matt Woodhead and Helen Monks, and producer Ellie Claughton.

LUNG were associate artists at The Lowry Theatre for 5 years, and have made work with Leeds Playhouse, Battersea Arts Centre and The National Theatre Studio.

LUNG's productions are known for their audience engagement and community activism. Their first production The 56 told the story of the Bradford City stadium fire, using the real words of the survivors. The proceeds of the production went towards Bradford Burns Research Unit. The play was adapted for BBC Radio 4. LUNG's play E15 told the story of the London Housing Crisis through the eyes of the Focus E15 campaign. Monks and Woodhead worked closely with the campaign for 2 years, and the play was written out of interviews they conducted during that time. Their play Who Cares saw them work with young carers in Salford across 2 years, and was performed at the House of Lords along with speeches from the real life young carers whose stories are in the play. Out of the Who Cares play, LUNG launched the Who Cares Campaign, which continues to fight for better rights for young carers across the UK, led by Matt Woodhead as the campaign manager. LUNG's play Trojan Horse retold the Birmingham Trojan Horse scandal. Adapted from over 200 hours' worth over interviews conducted by LUNG, the play was the winner of the Amnesty International Freedom of Expression Award, 2018. After 2 national tours, LUNG organised a guerrilla performance of show in a community hall in the grounds of Park View School, taking the accused teachers and governors back to the school they had been originally banned from.
