= Rachel McKibbens =

American poet

- Born: Rachel Anne Camacho; Anaheim, California, U.S.
- Occupations: Poet, author
- Children: 5

Rachel McKibbens is an American poet originally from Santa Ana, California.

== Early life ==
McKibbens was born Rachel Anne Camacho in Anaheim, California, and raised in Santa Ana. McKibbens was born during her parents' divorce proceedings and was briefly placed in foster care after she was born. She and her younger brother were separated in the foster care system before their father gained custody of them.

== Career ==
McKibbens is known for her poetry, essays, and short stories. She currently resides in upstate New York, where she teaches and writes.

In reviewing her book Pink Elephant, a critic for The Rumpus said "McKibbens awakens and haunts with selfless honesty." Publishers Weekly gave a positive review of her book blud, saying "The poems feature razor-sharp imagery, and McKibbens exhibits an ear attuned to sonic texture."

== Personal life ==
McKibbens lives in Rochester, New York, and has five children. In 2021, her father and brother died of COVID-19. The story of their deaths, along with McKibbens' family history, became the subject of the 2022 podcast We Were Three, produced by Serial and The New York Times.

== Works ==
- Pink Elephant (Cypher, 2009; Small Doggies, 2016)
- Into the Dark & Emptying Field (Small Doggies, 2013)
- blud (Copper Canyon Press, 2017)
