= Focus E15 =

London-based campaign for housing justice

- Focus E15 logo
- Named after: Focus E15 Hostel
- Formation: 2013
- Founded at: Focus E15 Hostel
- Type: Housing action group
- Purpose: Housing rights
- Location: Newham, London
- Website: focuse15.org

Focus E15 is a campaign group formed in the London Borough of Newham in 2013 by a group of mothers threatened with eviction from their emergency accommodation in a hostel for young homeless people in Stratford. The group squatted empty flats on the Carpenters Estate in Stratford in September 2014, drawing widespread attention in the mainstream media. Most of the young women were eventually rehoused within the borough, as they had requested. Having won their own battle, they have continued to protest both against the local housing policy of Newham Council and for housing rights more generally. They have done so by occupying various buildings and supporting different individual struggles.

== Formation ==
Focus E15 was formed in 2013 when the East Thames Housing Association (ETHA) served notices of eviction to 29 mothers living in the Focus E15 hostel for young homeless people in Newham, in East London. The mothers, almost all under 25, campaigned against Newham Council's decision to cut funding for the hostel and its suggestion that they took rented accommodation in other, far away cities such as Birmingham or Manchester.

Members of the group ran a weekly help and advice stall on Saturdays on Stratford High Street. In 2015, they attempted to talk to the mayor of Newham, Robin Wales, at the Mayor's Show in a local park but were escorted away by security guards; his lack of an adequate response led them towards direct action and protest occupations, which attracted mainstream media attention. Robin Wales was later censured for "failing to show appropriate respect to a member of the public" by the council's standards advisory committee. He was also asked to attend a mediated meeting with members of Focus E15.

The group's first occupation was at the East Thames Housing Association building in Stratford in January 2014. Mothers pushing children in buggies entered the offices and occupied the showroom. The model living space was temporarily used as a children's party.

== Carpenters Estate ==
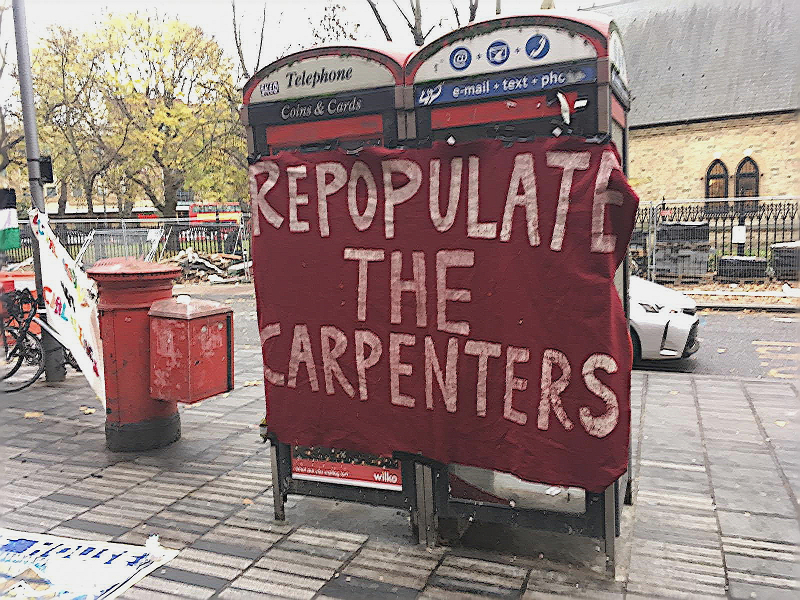
'Repopulate the Carpenters' banner at the Focus E15 street stall

The group occupied empty flats in a block on Doran Walk on the Carpenters Estate in Stratford in September 2014. One flat was used as a self-managed social centre and visited by hundreds of people in its short lifetime. The protest action drew widespread attention in the mainstream media and highlighted that even though the houses had been empty for between 4 and 8 years, they were in good condition and could be lived in. This was seen as scandalous by Focus E15 since at that time there were 16,000 people on the waiting list for an apartment in Newham.

Newham Council immediately went to court in order to obtain an eviction order and refused to listen to the demands of Focus E15. It stated that the Carpenters Estate was standing empty because it was too expensive to renovate and the plan was to redevelop it. The squatters were described as "agitators and hangers on" by a local councillor. The occupation and court case were both visited by Russell Brand, who spoke in support of the mothers and the squat was documented by a photographer for The Guardian.

The council was granted a repossession order and a deal was made that the squatters would leave by 7 October. Focus E15 took this as a victory, since the mayor apologised for the way they had at first been treated and promised that 40 homeless people could move back onto the estate to live there until it was demolished. Ultimately, most of the young women were rehoused within the borough as they had requested, but in privately rented accommodation and on 12-month contracts.

The building which housed the Focus E15 Hostel was eventually bought by Newham Council in 2016. Mayor Robin Wales said this would make it easier to care for some of the borough's most vulnerable residents. It was renamed Brimstone House and in 2019, inhabitants began a legal challenge against the council, arguing that their temporary placement was lasting too long.

== Individual cases ==
In 2015, a mother and her three children were evicted from a privately rented house in Stratford with two weeks' notice. The council at first said she would be rehoused locally, but then offered emergency accommodation in Edgware in north west London. The mother refused this offer, finding it too far to travel both to take the children to their schools and to commute for her job as a cleaner at the council offices. The council then said she had made herself intentionally homeless and called the police to escort her out of the housing office. The family ended up sleeping the night on the floor of Forest Gate police station. When she contacted Focus E15 for help, she was offered emergency accommodation locally. In a separate case, a family consisting of mother and daughter were evicted from their council flat in Kerrison Road, Stratford, because the mother had lost her housing benefit and fallen behind in rental payments. Focus E15 pledged to help them and occupied their flat in April 2015. The occupation was called Jane Come Home, in reference to the film Cathy Come Home. Focus E15 redecorated the flat and held a 'welcome home' party. With the help of her wider family the mother offered to repay her debt but was not permitted to do so. She was then invited to a meeting at the council offices and while she was out the council attempted to repossess the flat. A 20 year old participant in Focus E15, was in the flat at the time and was arrested on suspicion of squatting in a residential building. The charges were then dropped less than 24 hours before the trial in May 2015.

In 2016, a mother and her three children resident in Newham were forced to accept a single room as emergency accommodation in Boundary House in Welwyn Garden City in Hertfordshire, outside London. She was told it would be temporary but ended up living there for 18 months. After complaining to the council and asking Focus E15 for assistance, she was first offered accommodation in Birmingham and then moved to Basildon in Essex. Newham Council have since stopped using Boundary House. Four members of Focus E15 occupied the derelict former East Ham police station for one day in 2016 to highlight the availability of empty buildings in the borough and to protest evictions. They left peacefully at the end of the day and there were no arrests.

In 2018, a mother and Newham resident of 12 years was living in emergency conditions for six months when she was offered accommodation in Birmingham, a city over 100 miles away. When she requested a review of this decision, she was told that it was an appropriate one. Alongside other groups, Focus E15 supported the mother in her request to be rehoused locally. If she had accepted the offer to move to Birmingham, she would have lost her job and she would have had to move her son to a different school. Since she refused the offer, she was declared intentionally homeless by the council and denied a right to appeal, twice. She then challenged the decision in court and won the right to appeal.

The new mayor of Newham, Rokhsana Fiaz (elected 2018), promised to rehouse displaced people and also to give residents more of a voice on matters such as the future of the Carpenters Estate. However, in 2019, a woman living in Victoria House (the building which formerly housed the Focus E15 hostel) received a note from a council worker threatening her with homelessness. Fiaz commented that the incident "undermines every thing we are working towards. I feel massively let down and ashamed that this happened." In 2022, Focus E15 criticised the council and its housing wing Populo Living for spending over £350,000 on an estate regeneration ballot, when residents could only run an unfunded protest campaign.

== In popular culture ==
Between September 2015 and April 2016, Focus E15 members took part in and advised on participatory action research which analysed 64 interviews with people who had contacted Newham Council in the preceding year about issues concerning housing or homelessness. It found that Newham Council had both one of the highest amounts of people in temporary accommodation in the capital and one of the highest numbers of homeless people rehoused in places outside London. LUNG Theatre performed the play E15 on the Northern Stage at Summerhall, at the 2016 Edinburgh Festival. It was a verbatim account of the Focus E15 campaign, with a young cast and a theatre decked out with banners and slogans. Written by Helen Monks, the play then transferred to the Battersea Arts Centre. An all-female theatre troupe called You should see the other guy toured their piece Land of the Three Towers across various London housing estates threatened with eviction. Whilst the play told the story of Focus E15, the directors drew out the relevances for other housing struggles. The play's dialogue is taken verbatim from documentary footage of the Focus E15 occupation.

The all-female Rebel Choir was formed out of Focus E15. It has run workshops and has performed alongside other choirs at the Women's Strike Assembly in central London on 8 March 2018, on International Women's Day. Also in 2018, cassette and digital formats of a music compilation were made available as a fundraiser for Focus E15, arranged by the online radio station NTS.

Awarded funds to create a social networking hub, Focus E15 rented a corner shop in Stratford and called it Sylvia's Corner. The name is a reference to east London socialist and suffragette Sylvia Pankhurst.

== See also ==
- Homelessness in England
