= Michael Gove as Education Secretary =

Michael Gove's tenure at the Department for Education (2010–2014)

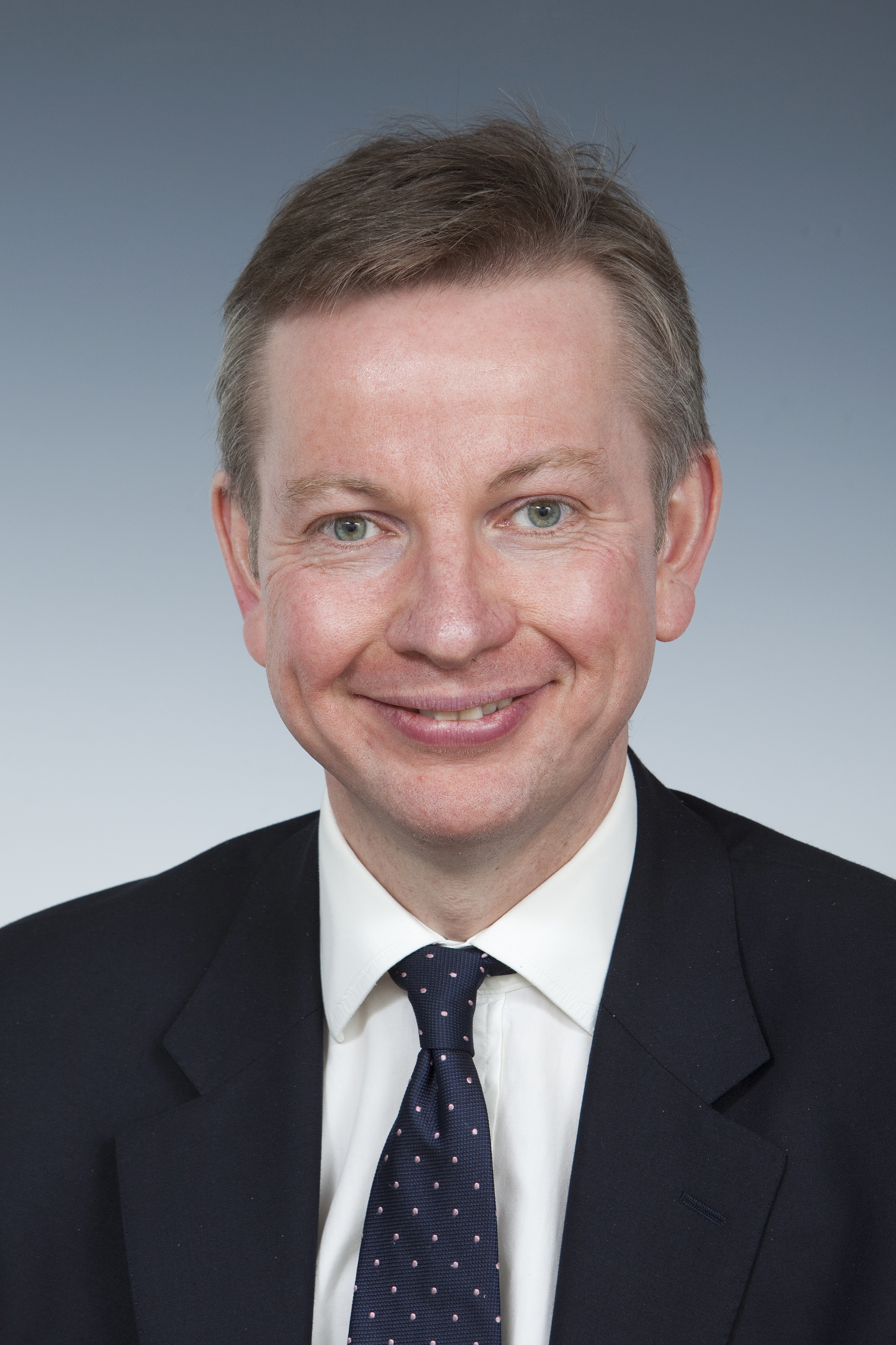
- Official portrait, 2012
- Michael Gove as Education Secretary; 12 May 2010 – 15 July 2014
- Party: Conservative
- Election: 2010
- Nominated by: David Cameron
- Appointed by: Elizabeth II

British Conservative Party politician Michael Gove served as Secretary of State for Education from 2010 to 2014.

Gove was appointed as Education Secretary with the formation of the Cameron–Clegg coalition, having previously been the shadow secretary of state for children, schools and families. His earliest moves included reorganising his department, announcing plans to allow schools rated as Outstanding by Ofsted to become academies, and cutting the previous government's school-building programme.

He opened the National Pupil Database and introduced the phonics check, a reading test for year 1 pupils. The later parts of his tenure were dominated by the Trojan Horse scandal. During his Education Secretaryship, Gove was criticised by teachers unions and academic associations for his attempts to overhaul British education. He left the role when he was moved by Prime Minister David Cameron to the office of chief whip in the 2014 cabinet reshuffle.

== Appointment and early actions ==
Gove became Secretary of State for Education with the formation of the Conservative-Liberal Democrat coalition government following the hung parliament after the 2010 general election. He ascended to the role after serving as Shadow Secretary of State for Children, Schools and Families in the Shadow Cabinet of David Cameron from 2007 to 2010. An early action was changing the name of the department from the Department for Children, Schools and Families to its previous name, the Department for Education. He announced plans for schools rated as Outstanding by Ofsted to be allowed to become academies.

== Comments on social class and school achievement ==
In July 2010, he said that the Labour Party had failed in their attempt to break the link between social class and school achievement despite spending billions of pounds: quoting research, he indicated that by the age of six years, children of low ability from affluent homes were still out-performing brighter children from poorer backgrounds. At a House of Commons Education Select Committee he said that this separation of achievement grew larger throughout pupils' school careers, stating: "In effect, rich thick kids do better than poor clever children when they arrive at school [and] the situation as they go through gets worse".

== Exam and curriculum reforms ==
Gove's views on exam systems became clear in December 2014 after the release of archive papers from 1986. GCSEs were the brainchild of Sir Keith Joseph. Margaret Thatcher, believing they lacked rigour, fiercely opposed them. However, opposition to the new exams from the teaching unions persuaded her to introduce them immediately, purely so as not to appear weak. Although Gove had sought but failed to replace them, his special advisor, Dominic Cummings, described the 1986 decision as catastrophic, leading to a collapse in the integrity of the exam system.

During the 2010 Conservative Party Conference, Gove announced that the primary and secondary-school national curricula for England would be restructured, and that study of authors such as Byron, Keats, Austen, Dickens and Hardy would be reinstated in English lessons as part of a plan to improve children's grasp of English literature and language. Academies are not required to follow the national curriculum, and so would not be affected by the reforms. Children who failed to write coherently and grammatically, or who were weak in spelling, would be penalised in the new examinations. Historian Simon Schama would give advice to Government to ensure that pupils learnt Britain's "island story". Standards in mathematics and science would also be strengthened. He said that this was needed because left-wing ideologies had undermined education. Theirs was the view, he thought, that schools "shouldn't be doing anything so old-fashioned as passing on knowledge, requiring children to work hard, or immersing them in anything like dates in history or times tables in mathematics. These ideologues may have been inspired by generous ideals but the result of their approach has been countless children condemned to a prison house of ignorance".

In a November 2010 white paper, Gove declared reforms would include the compulsory study of foreign languages up to the age of sixteen years, a shake-up of league tables in which schools are ranked higher for the number of pupils taking GCSEs in five core subjects (English, mathematics, science, a language and one of the humanities), and the introduction of targets for primary schools. It proposed that trainee teachers should spend more time in the classroom, teacher training applicants should be more rigorously tested—including tests of character and emotional intelligence—and sponsorships for former troops to retrain as teachers to improve discipline. It also said teachers would receive guidance on how to search pupils for more items, including mobile phones and pornography, and when they can use force.

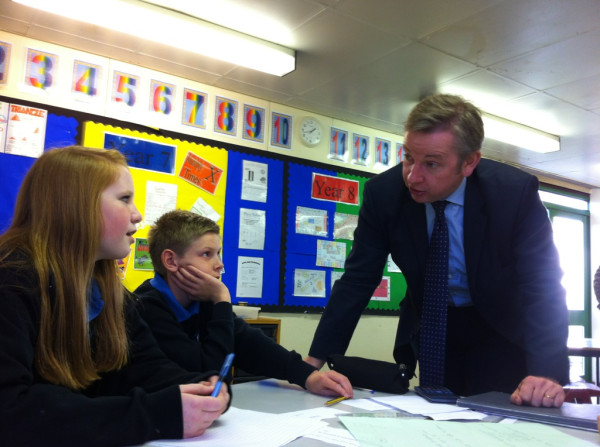
Gove, as Education Secretary, at Chantry High School, Ipswich

In April 2011, Gove criticised schools for not studying pre-twentieth century classics and blamed "England's constricted and unreformed exam system" for failing to encourage children to read. Gove also blamed an "anti-knowledge culture" for reducing achievement and said children benefited when expectations were set higher. In June 2011, his own "ignorance of science" was criticised after he called for students to have "a rooting in the basic scientific principles" and by way of example assigned Lord Kelvin's laws of thermodynamics to Sir Isaac Newton.

In June 2012, the Daily Mail published leaked plans to scrap GCSE examinations, return to O-level exams and allow less academic students to take alternative qualifications. The Liberal Democrats claimed that the plans had not been discussed with the deputy prime minister and were subsequently heavily criticised by some teachers, trade unions and Labour Party MPs; they had been discussed with the prime minister at Cabinet level, and a subsequent YouGov/Sunday Times poll suggested that the public supported this policy by a margin of 50% to 32%. They received praise from the then-mayor of London Boris Johnson, who said that he "could be... singing a hymn of praises for my old chum Gove and his brilliant new Gove-levels." The leaked documents also suggested that Gove was intending to create a single exam board to organise all exams, and to scrap the National Curriculum in its current form. However, there were "rebukes" from both the Welsh and Northern Ireland education ministers who said it was important to communicate before making announcements on proposed changes to jointly owned qualifications.

In February 2013, shortly after the draft Programmes of Study for History in the national curriculum was released by the DfE, the representatives of the principal organisations for historians in the UK wrote to The Observer to register "significant reservations" about its contents and the way in which it had been devised. They described it as "too narrowly and exclusively focused on British history" and argued that structuring history teaching in a strictly chronological sequence meant that students would learn about pre-modern history only in the early stages of their studies.

In March 2013, 100 academics wrote an open letter arguing that Gove's curriculum placed too much emphasis upon memorisation of facts and rules over understanding, and would lead to more rote learning. Gove retorted that "there is good academia and bad academia." In response, one signatory to the letter opined that Gove suffered from a "blinkered, almost messianic, self-belief, which appears to have continually ignored the expertise and wisdom of teachers, head-teachers, advisers and academics, whom he often claims to have consulted", A senior civil servant admitted that one of the most controversial parts of the proposed secondary curriculum had been written internally by the DfE, without any input from experts. His position on history teaching drew a positive response from only 4% of the Historical Association's membership.

In May, Simon Schama, earlier mooted as a supporter of Gove's reforms of the history curriculum, delivered an excoriating speech in which he characterised the finalised proposals as "insulting and offensive" and "pedantic and utopian", accusing Gove of constructing a "ridiculous shopping list" of subjects. He urged the audience at the Hay Festival: "Tell Michael Gove what you think of it. Let him know." In June, leaked documents revealed that a member of the Government's curriculum advisory group had described the reform process as having had "a very chaotic feel. It's typical of Government policy at the moment: they don't think things through very carefully, they don't listen to anyone and then just go ahead and rush into major changes." In September, Robin Alexander said that the proposed reforms to the primary-level national curriculum were "neo Victorian", "educationally inappropriate and pedagogically counter-productive". In October, almost 200 people, including Carol Ann Duffy, Melvin Burgess and Michael Rosen, as well as academics from Oxford, Bristol and Newcastle universities, signed a letter to The Times condemning Gove's reforms, warning of the "enormous" and negative risks they posed to children and their education.

That same month saw Oxford's head of admissions warn that the timetable for secondary-level reforms would "just wreck the English education system".

From 1988 until 2011, the UK GCSE pass rate improved year-on-year, from 41.9% in 1988 to 69.8% in 2011. Under Gove, however, the first decline in the UK GCSE pass rate since records began was observed, with the rate standing at 69.1% when Gove entered office as Education Secretary in 2010, and having declined to 68.8% by the time he left office in 2014. The rate would further decline to 66.4% by 2017, and by the time the Conservatives left office in 2024, it remained below the 2011 peak at 67.6%.

== Building Schools for the Future and school capital projects ==
Gove said that the previous government's school-building programme, Building Schools for the Future (BSF), would experience cutting. He apologised, however, when the list of terminated school-building projects he had released was found to be inaccurate; the list was reannounced several times before it was finally accurately published.

In February 2011, a judicial review deemed Gove's decision to axe BSF projects in six local authority areas unlawful as he had failed to consult before imposing the cuts. The judge also said that, in five of the cases, the failure was "so unfair as to amount to an abuse of power" and that "however pressing the economic problems, there was no overriding public interest which precluded consultation or justifies the lack of any consultation". The councils' response was that the Government would have to reconsider but the Government said it had won the case on the substantial issues. The judge made clear that, contrary to the councils' position, they could not expect that their projects would be funded.

In March 2011, Gove was criticised for not understanding the importance of school architecture and having misrepresented the cost. In February 2011, he gave "not-quite-true information to Parliament" by saying that one individual made £1,000,000 in one year when the true figure was £700,000 for five advisers at different times over a four-year period. He told a free schools conference that "no one in this room is here to make architects richer" and specifically mentioned architect Richard Rogers.

== Freedom of information and email ==
During the Cameron–Clegg ministry, Gove was the subject of repeated criticism for alleged attempts to avoid the provisions of the Freedom of Information Act. The criticism surrounded Gove's use of various private email accounts to send emails that allegedly related to his departmental responsibilities. The allegations suggested that Gove and his advisers believed they could avoid their correspondence being subject to freedom of information requests, as they believed that their private email accounts were not subject to the Freedom of Information Act. In September 2011, the Financial Times reported that Gove had used an undisclosed private email account – called "Mrs Blurt" – to discuss government business with advisers.

In March 2012 the Information Commissioner ruled that because emails the Financial Times had requested contained public information they could be the subject of a freedom of information request and ordered the information requested by the paper to be disclosed. Gove was also advised to cease the practice of using private email accounts to conduct government business. He disputed the information commissioner's ruling and proceeded to tribunal, costing taxpayers £12,540 in fees for legal advice, but the appeal was withdrawn.

It was also alleged by the Financial Times that Gove and his advisors had destroyed email correspondence in order to avoid freedom of information requests. The allegation was denied by Gove's department who stated that deleting email was simply part of good computer housekeeping.

== Creationist schools ==
In June 2012, Gove approved three creationist schools, including Grindon Hall Christian School in Sunderland, which opened in September 2012. This led to concerns about whether Department for Education (DfE) requirements not to teach creationism or intelligent design as science would be met. The other creationist schools included Exemplar-Newark Business Academy, whose previous application was rejected because of concerns over creationism, and a third school in Kent. Both schools said they would teach creationism in RE but not in Science.

The British Humanist Association (BHA) said teaching creationism in any syllabus was unacceptable. In 2014, Gove's department acceded to the BHA's campaign by banning creationism from being taught as science in state-funded English schools, including academies and free schools, as well as introducing a requirement that such schools must teach evolution.

== 2012 English GCSE results ==
In September 2012, following the furore surrounding the downgrading of GCSE English results, he refused, during his answers to the Parliamentary Education Committee on 12 September, to instruct Ofqual to intervene, and attacked his Welsh counterpart as "irresponsible and mistaken" for ordering disputed GCSEs to be regraded. On 17 September he announced to the House of Commons an English Baccalaureate Certificate to replace GCSE, comprising English, Maths, Science, together with a Humanities subject and language, to be first examined in 2017. His plans to replace GCSE examinations with an English Baccalaureate were rejected by Parliament in February 2013.

== History curriculum reform ==
During his tenure as Secretary of State for Education, Gove introduced major reforms to the national history curriculum for England. In February 2013, the Department for Education published a draft curriculum that removed many existing references to topics such as the transatlantic slave trade, the British Empire, migration, and multicultural Britain, replacing them with a chronological list emphasising political and national history. More than 100 historians, including signatories from the Historical Association and several universities, publicly criticised the proposals for being "narrow", "nationalistic", and for marginalising Britain's imperial and global past.

Following widespread criticism, including from teachers' organisations and academic specialists in imperial and social history, the Government issued a revised version later in 2013 which reinstated broader thematic references to empire, slavery, and multiculturalism, though these topics were no longer compulsory and were left to schools' discretion. A subsequent report by the Historical Association noted that, despite the revisions, the final curriculum significantly reduced explicit statutory requirements to teach Britain's imperial history compared with the pre-2010 framework.

== Children's homes scandal and data protection rules ==
In September 2013, news that the DfE did not maintain a register of children's homes in the UK came to light as a result of an article Gove wrote for The Daily Telegraph. Gove asserted his prior ignorance and surprise that the department did not hold this information and claimed that "Ofsted was prevented by 'data protection' rules, 'child protection' concerns and other bewildering regulations from sharing that data with us, or even with the police".

Gove's claim was refuted the same day by the information commissioner, Sir Christopher Graham, who pointed out there was "nothing" in data protection legislation that prevents vulnerable young people from being properly protected in care homes. Graham noted that "[t]his law covers information about people so it has no bearing on the disclosure of non-personal information like the location of care homes", and said he would be writing to both Gove and Sir Michael Wilshaw about the matter.

== Social work training ==
In November 2013 Gove delivered a speech to the NSPCC in which he argued that social work training involved "idealistic students being told that the individuals with whom they will work have been disempowered by society". Gove held that students were being "encouraged to see [service users] as victims of social injustice whose fate is overwhelmingly decreed by the economic forces and inherent inequalities which scar our society". Gove suggested that the intellectual demands of many social work courses should be raised. Gove explained that the training of social workers was of personal importance to him because his own life had been transformed by social workers as a result of his adoption at the age of four months old.

While serving as Education Secretary, Gove asked Sir Martin Narey, a former director general of prisons and chief executive of Barnardo's, to conduct a review of social work education. Narey subsequently made 18 recommendations, which he said could be implemented at "minimal cost", for the reform of social work education. Narey called for more emphasis to be placed on practical skills and suggested that some of the students recruited were not up to the job. He found that course standards varied widely and called for tighter minimum entry standards and the standardisation of the teaching provided to social work students.

== Birmingham schools row ==
In June 2014, a very public argument arose between the Home Office and Department for Education ministers about responsibility for alleged extremism in Birmingham schools, which required Prime Minister David Cameron's intervention to resolve.

The prime minister asked Gove to apologise to Home Office Office for Security and Counter-Terrorism Head Charles Farr for briefings critical of him which appeared on The Times front page.

== Criticism from the teaching profession ==
Gove was criticised by teachers unions for his attempts to overhaul British education. At the Association of Teachers and Lecturers Annual Conference in March 2013 a motion of no-confidence in Gove was passed. This was followed up the next month at the annual conference of the National Union of Teachers (NUT), who unanimously passed a vote of no confidence in Gove and called for his resignation.

The audience at the NUT conference was told by delegates that Gove had "lost the confidence of the teaching profession", "failed to conduct his duties in a manner befitting the head of a national education system", and "chosen to base policy on dogma, political rhetoric and his own limited experience of education." Gove was further criticised at the May 2013 conference of the National Association of Head Teachers, for what they claimed was a climate of bullying, fear and intimidation during his time as Education Secretary. The conference passed a vote of no confidence in his policies.

Changes to pay, pensions, and workloads were also controversial. The NUT and NASUWT staged strikes on a regional basis in October 2013, although a national strike was averted. After talks failed, strike action affecting 10,000 schools took place in March 2014.

Sarah Vine, Gove's wife, accused socialists of sending their family "vicious and aggressive" death threats due to Gove's education reforms, and said she had considered moving with their two children to Italy as a result of these threats. Before the coalition Government, in 2010, a YouGov poll of teachers' voting intentions found that 33% were Conservative and 32% were Labour; four years later, a poll found that only 16% were Conservative and 57% were Labour.

== See also ==
- Premiership of David Cameron
