= Barry Squires =

English footballer (1931–2017)

Personal information
- Full name: Barry Squires
- Date of birth: 29 July 1931
- Place of birth: Birmingham, England
- Date of death: 18 August 2017 (aged 86)
- Height: 5 ft 8 in (1.73 m)
- Positions: Outside left; left half

Youth career
- BSA ATC

Senior career*
Years	Team	Apps	(Gls)
	Wolverhampton Wanderers	0	(0)
- Wycombe Wanderers
- Lye Town
1953–1954	Birmingham City	1	(0)
1954–1955	Bradford City	7	(0)
1955–195?	Yeovil Town		
- Gloucester City
195?–1957	Kidderminster Harriers		
1957–195?	Rugby Town		
1958	Gresley Rovers	5	(1)
- * Club domestic league appearances and goals

Barry Squires (29 July 1931 – 18 August 2017) was an English professional footballer who played as an outside left in the Football League for Birmingham City and Bradford City.

== Career ==
Squires was born in 1931 in the Sparkhill district of Birmingham. He attended Golden Hillock Road School and captained its football team. He was a member of the Air Training Corps squadron associated with the BSA factory in Small Heath, and played for its football team, before completing his National Service with the RAF. During a lengthy posting to High Wycombe, he was able to play Isthmian League football for Wycombe Wanderers, and was selected to represent Berks & Bucks county. He was on the books of Wolverhampton Wanderers as an amateur, had trials with clubs including Portsmouth and Bristol City, and played for Lye Town, before signing professional forms with Birmingham City in May 1953.

Having to compete with Alex Govan for the outside left position meant Squires had little chance of first-team football. In February 1954, after Govan damaged a toe in training, he was in contention with Geoff Cox and Dennis Hill to start against West Ham United, but Hill was preferred. The only first-team appearance Squires made for the club was on 13 March in a 2–0 defeat away to Brentford in the Second Division, again in the absence of Govan.

He was listed for transfer at the end of the season, and joined Bradford City for a "moderate" fee. He made seven appearances in the Third Division North, and continued his career in non-league football with Yeovil Town, Gloucester City, Kidderminster Harriers, Rugby Town, and Gresley Rovers, for whom he scored once in five games playing at left half.

Squires died on 18 August 2017 at the age of 86.

== Sources ==
- Matthews, Tony (1995). Birmingham City: A Complete Record. Derby: Breedon Books. ISBN 978-1-85983-010-9.
