= Trojan Horse scandal =

2013 British scandal

The Trojan Horse scandal, also known as "Operation Trojan Horse" or the Trojan Horse affair, was a conspiracy theory that posited a plot to introduce an "Islamist" or "Salafist" ethos into several schools in Birmingham, in the UK. The name, based on the Greek legend, comes from an anonymous letter sent to Birmingham City Council in late 2013, alleged to be from Birmingham "Islamists" detailing how to wrest control of a school, and speculating about expanding the scheme to other cities. The letter was leaked to the press in March 2014; a month later the Birmingham City Council said it had received hundreds of allegations of similar plots, some dating back over 20 years. The letter has been characterised as "incomplete, unsigned and unaddressed", but led to two investigations commissioned by the Department for Education and Birmingham City Council, the Clarke and Kershaw Reports, respectively. The reports found no "plot", but alleged "behaviour indicative of a concerted attempt to change schools."

Tahir Alam, former chairman of the Park View Educational Trust, which ran three schools in Birmingham, was alleged to have written a 72-page document for the Muslim Council of Britain in 2007 detailing a blueprint for the "Islamisation" of secular state schools, a claim that has been widely debunked. The government's Department for Education initially responded to the scandal in 2015 by banning Alam and 14 other teachers from the teaching profession for life. Bans against 14 other teachers were eventually overturned, dropped and/or dismissed in courts between 2016 and 2017. The teachers had been barred from responding to the allegations due to confidentiality orders as part of their employment contracts that were binding also after the suspension.

In January 2022, The New York Times released The Trojan Horse Affair, an investigative podcast about the scandal, which it characterized as an Islamophobic hoax and compared it to The Protocols of the Elders of Zion, a historical antisemitic hoax. The podcast alleged that the Headteacher of Adderley Primary School in Birmingham, Rizvana Darr, was the real author of the Trojan Horse letter, sparking controversy. In December 2022 the conservative pressure group Policy Exchange challenged the findings of The New York Times; the group's founder Michael Gove, who had served as the UK's Secretary of State for Education during the scandal, complained that the Times portrayed Britain as "an insular backwater whose inhabitants are drowning in a tide of nostalgia, racism and bad food."

== Background ==
Ofsted inspections were undertaken into 21 schools in Birmingham, with the Education Funding Agency (responsible for academy schools) also investigating Park View Education Trust and Oldknow Academy. Ofsted said it had found evidence of an organised campaign to target certain schools by Islamists and that head teachers had been "marginalised or forced out of their jobs". Golden Hillock School, Nansen Primary School, Park View School – all run by the Park View Educational Trust – Oldknow Academy and Saltley School were placed in special measures after inspectors found systemic failings including the schools having failed to take adequate steps to safeguard pupils against extremism. Another school investigated, Alston Primary, was already in special measures. A sixth school was labelled inadequate for its poor educational standards and twelve schools were found needing of improvements. Three schools were commended. Ofsted subsequently expanded their investigation into schools in East London, Bradford and Luton over concerns regarding a limited curriculum and pupils' detachment from the wider community.

Ofsted chief Sir Michael Wilshaw accused Birmingham City Council of a "serious failure" in supporting schools in protecting children from extremism. Its leader, Sir Albert Bore, said that the Council accepted the Ofsted findings that schools in the city were failing pupils. Birmingham City Council commissioned Ian Kershaw of Northern Education Trust in Newcastle to review the evidence. However, because some of the schools were academies under the responsibility of the Department for Education, the then Secretary of State, Michael Gove, commissioned a separate report by Peter Clarke, the former head of the Metropolitan police's counterterrorism command. The two inquiries shared evidence, with the Kershaw inquiry deferring matters of extremism to the Clarke inquiry. The latter found that there is "no evidence to suggest that there is a problem with governance generally" nor any "evidence of terrorism, radicalisation or violent extremism in the schools of concern in Birmingham", but said that there was "evidence that there are a number of people, associated with each other and in positions of influence in schools and governing bodies, who espouse, sympathise with or fail to challenge extremist views", and that there had been "co-ordinated, deliberate and sustained" attempts "by a number of associated individuals, to introduce an intolerant and aggressive Islamic ethos" into "a few schools in Birmingham". The report found that senior council officials and elected members were apparently aware of these issues, but dealt with them on a case-by-case basis rather than making "any serious attempt to see if there was a pattern", though it is not clear whether this was due to "community cohesion", an "issue of education management", or appeasement. Birmingham City Council imposed a temporary freeze on the appointment of school governors after probes into Operation Trojan Horse were announced; after the Trojan Horse affair, this was replaced by a new duty to promote "fundamental British values".

The British Prime Minister, David Cameron, said that "protecting our children [was] one of the first duties of government" and convened an emergency meeting of the Extremism Taskforce and a ministerial meeting to discuss the affair. He announced proposals to send Ofsted to any school without warning, saying that the schools in question had been able to stage a "cover-up" previously. The government terminated its funding arrangement with three of the schools. In the wake of the findings, Michael Gove, the Education Secretary, announced that all schools in the country will have to promote British values of tolerance and fairness and said that teachers will be banned from the profession if they allow extremists into schools.

A number of governors and the Muslim Council of Britain dubbed the reaction of authorities to the plot a "witch-hunt". In protest of the investigations, Tahir Alam and several governors of affected schools resigned. As Holmwood and O'Toole show, neither the Kershaw Report nor the Clarke Report gave any attention to the schools improvement policies of Birmingham City Council or the Department for Education. This had been initiated by Sir Tim Brighouse, who had been Chief Education Officer in Birmingham between 1993 and 2002, and was highly critical of the 2014 Ofsted reports and the subsequent inquiries. This included a special concern with the achievement of pupils of Asian heritage, as set out in its "Asian heritage achievement action plan" of 19 December 2003.

== Letter ==
The leaked letter on the alleged plot was reported by media including the BBC on 7 March 2014. The letter was alleged to have been written from Birmingham and sent to a contact in Bradford to expand the operation into that city. Its author described the plan as "totally invisible to the naked eye and [allowing] us to operate under the radar". In it, responsibility was claimed for installing a new headteacher at four schools in Birmingham, and it highlighted 12 others in the city which would be easy targets due to large Muslim attendance and poor inspection reports. It encouraged parents to complain about the school's leadership with false accusations of sex education, forced Christian prayer and mixed physical education, with the aim of obtaining a new leadership of Islamists. The letter described pressure being put on the head teacher at Regents Park school, a school judged to be outstanding and "planting the seed of her cheating". The school was one of those identified in the Kershaw and Clarke Reports, but no information about it was provided. The headteacher and deputy headteacher were subsequently found guilty at an NCTL hearing of falsifying SATs tests.

Of the schools mentioned by the letter, the account of Adderley Primary School was the more detailed, alleging that an employment dispute at Adderley was part of the Islamic plot's attempt to unseat the head teacher and install a conspirator with the same radical Islamification goals as the letter writers. West Midlands Police and the city council investigated whether the letter was a hoax and the plot had been concocted to support Adderley's school case at the employment tribunal. Four teacher assistants were suing the school for unfair dismissal after being forced out of the school with fake resignation letters signed in their names. Following a forensic report by a handwriting expert for the tribunal that strongly suggested the signatures were fraudulent, Birmingham City Council advised Adderley's leadership not to fight the claims and withdrew the usual indemnity granted to council-run schools. This audit report was later reportedly retracted by the council following the Trojan Horse letter, and has never been published. The New York Times podcast "The Trojan Horse Affair" uncovered this secret document that disproves one of the central allegations of the Trojan Horse letter, that there was a conspiracy against the headteacher of Adderley primary school.

The letter also encouraged getting academy status for successfully infiltrated schools, so as to have a curriculum independent of the local education authority.

The Times described the letter as "a crude forgery", noting that "The document appears to show that the conspirators were working to remove a primary school headmistress who was actually dismissed 20 years ago". The Guardian and The Independent both stated that the letter is "widely regarded as a fake". However, both the Kershaw Report and the Clarke Report organised their inquiries in terms of the 5-step plan described in the letter and following the publication of their reports, Birmingham City's education commissioner Sir Mike Tomlinson stated his belief that what the letter described was happening "without a shadow of doubt".

The controversy started with a disclosure by a former teacher from Park View School, who was later named as Michael White. His complaints were published on 24 February 2014, whereas the 'trojan horse' letter was not sent to the press until 2 March 2014.

=== Authorship ===
Based on interview and research in The New York Times podcast Serial, the producers argue that most levels of government did not prioritise the identification of the letter's author. They say that the letter had disproportionate emphasis on events at Adderley Primary School and the letter's timing proved a boon to Adderley's head teacher, Rizwana Darr, in Adderley's contemporaneous employment dispute immediately after an internal audit report had referred the dispute at Adderley to the police, specifically recommending Darr be investigated.

== Original allegations ==
On 14 April, the City Council confirmed that it had received over 200 reports from parents and staff at 25 schools in Birmingham. Council leader Sir Albert Bore stated that his council had spoken to authorities in Bradford and Manchester, and said that there are "certainly issues in Bradford which have similarities with the issues being spoken about in Birmingham". Concerns have also been raised by the National Association of Head Teachers about schools in parts of East London and other "large cities around the country". Senior Department for Education sources have also been reported as claiming that coordinated attempts to undermine and supplant head teachers have occurred in Bradford, Manchester, and the London boroughs of Waltham Forest and Tower Hamlets.

Two anonymous members of staff at Park View School told BBC Radio 4 that school assemblies had praised Anwar al-Awlaki. Although the school describes itself as "multi-faith", there are claims that the Islamic call to prayer is broadcast to the entire school. A senior teacher told inspectors that the solution to all problems would be a global Caliphate under Sharia law.

Michael White, a former teacher at Park View School which was mentioned in the letter, told the BBC that the school's governing board had been "taken over by a Muslim sect" in 1993. He claims he was pressured to ban sex education and the teaching of non-Muslim religions, and was dismissed in 2003 after he told prospective teachers to question the governors.

In May 2014, the BBC reported that Tim Boyes, the former headteacher of Queensbridge School, had written anonymously to Birmingham City Council in 2010 to try to expose Operation Trojan Horse, and in June a former prospective school governor said that he had informed authorities of the conspiracy in 2008.

Reverend John Ray, OBE, and ex-head teacher of a school in Pakistan, resigned as a governor of Golden Hillock School after 25 years. He raised concerns about the governance of Golden Hillock 20 years ago stating that the Trojan horse plot "reveals something, something that is true". Reverend Ray claimed that in the 1990s, when John Major was Prime Minister, he made the government aware of Islamists from Hizb ut-Tahrir becoming involved at his school.

Bhupinder Kondal, principal at Oldknow Academy, stated in July 2014 after the publishing of the reports that she recognised the steps illustrated in the letter and that governors had been trying to undermine her since 2009, although the Local Education Authority would not support her. She also said, "It is not just an academy problem, this was happening before we became an academy."

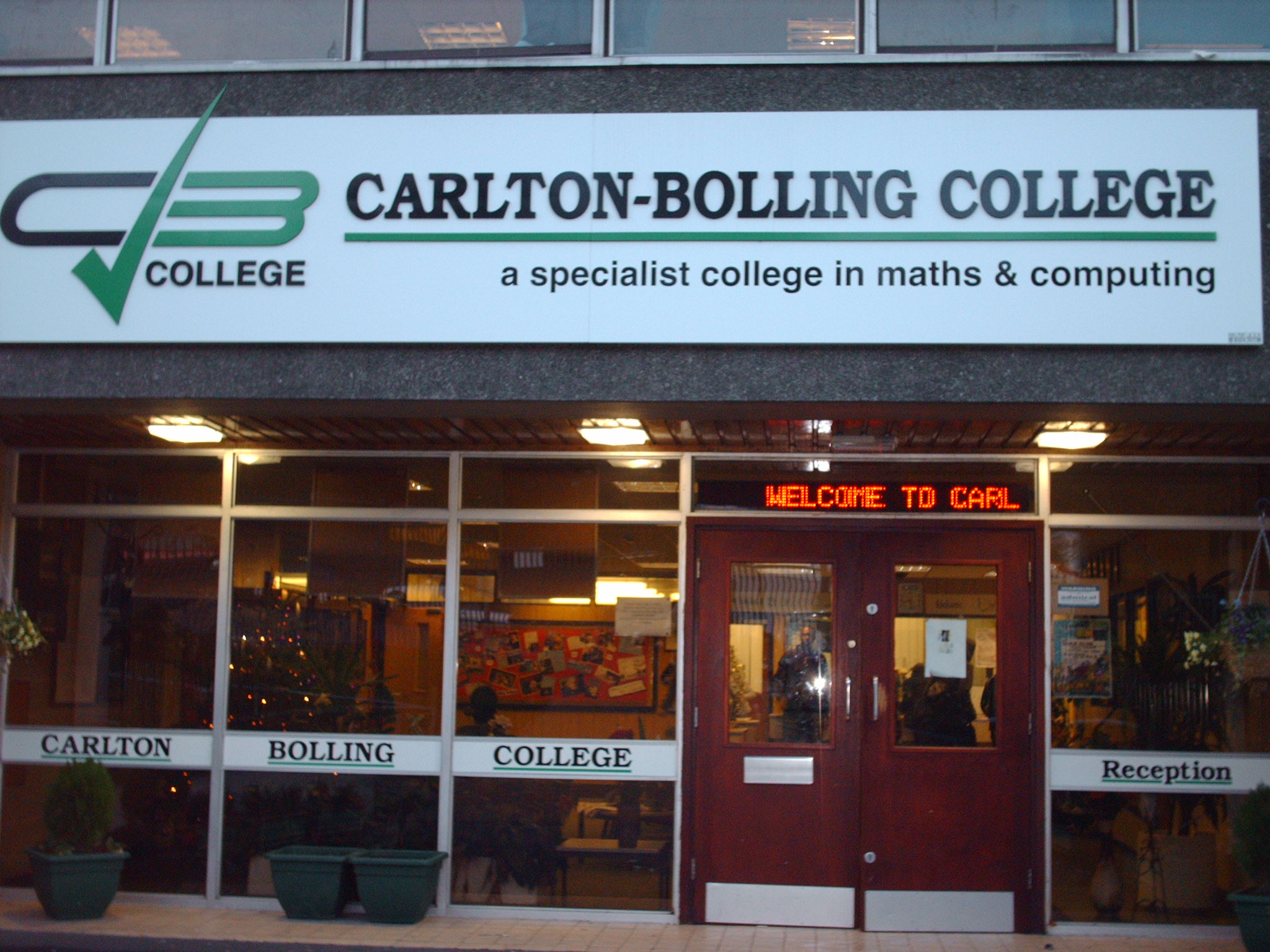
Gender segregation and intimidation by governors were alleged at Carlton Bolling College in Bradford

In Bradford, teachers reported instances of governors imposing an Islamic ethos. The BBC reported on gender segregation at a state secondary school, Carlton Bolling College, during trips and after-school workshops, as well as boys-only school trips. The school has a largely Muslim governing body. In 2012, head teacher Chris Robinson resigned, having felt that her reputation, integrity and leadership were being questioned by governors.

== Investigation ==
The Educational Funding Authority, Ofsted, and Birmingham City Council agreed to investigate the letter, although West Midlands Police decided that it was not a matter for them. Michael Gove, the Secretary of State for Education, said that "wider, more comprehensive action" was needed and appointed Peter Clarke, a former senior Metropolitan Police officer and ex-head of the Counter Terrorism Command. to lead the Department for Education analysis of "evidence of extremist infiltration in both academies and council-run schools".

Ofsted investigated in 21 schools in Birmingham in March 2014. The Education Funding Authority conducted a parallel investigation. Ofsted subsequently expanded their investigation into schools in the north and south-east of England. They investigated schools in East London, Bradford and Luton over concerns regarding a limited curriculum and pupils' detachment from the wider community.

Birmingham City Council announced an investigation into the allegations, estimated to last six months. Ian Kershaw, Head of Northern Education Trust in Newcastle, was named as its full-time special adviser.

In May, Mark Rogers, Birmingham City Council's Chief Executive, had a meeting with head teachers of affected schools. Despite calling for secrecy, a hidden recording was sent to The Daily Telegraph, in which Rogers criticised the approach to the conspiracy by Education Secretary Michael Gove and Chief Schools Inspector Sir Michael Wilshaw. He said that the overview report on the matter could trigger "some kind of bloody firestorm" and "may well lead to significant structural proposals" for the city council. Birmingham City Council was already under investigation by Sir Bob Kerslake over problems of governance associated with financial management, looked after children, waste services and issues of equal pay for work of equal value. Kerslake deferred issues of education to the Clarke and Kershaw Reports, but an appendix to his Report provided contextual data on poverty, adult education attainment, unemployment and school performance across comparator cities and for England as a whole. This showed Birmingham to be performing badly on most indicators, but outperforming other cities and the national average for its school results and the proportion of schools graded outstanding. The Kershaw and Clarke Reports provided no data on school performance in Birmingham or of the schools improvement programme which had shaken up schools following Sir Tim Brighouse's appointment.

== Allegations and investigation findings ==
As noted above, governors and teachers accused in the various investigations were given no opportunity to respond to the allegations and the claims made in the various reports were not subject to independent scrutiny until misconduct charges were brought by the NCTL against teachers associated with Park View Education Trust. Of 21 schools investigated by Ofsted, and 14 schools investigated by the Clarke Report, charges were brought against teachers at just 4 schools. Richard Kerbaj and Sian Griffiths, writing in The Sunday Times, reported that over 100 teachers would be charged with professional misconduct. In the event, just 12 teachers were subject to NCTL hearings, in which they were accused of "undue religious influence", not Islamist extremism. Most of the allegations presented in the Ofsted and EFA reports were not part of the cases against the teachers because they were not believed to be credible by NCTL lawyers. Others were challenged in court before the case against the senior teachers was discontinued. One EFA inspector went on to become educational adviser to Peter Clarke. Her credibility was called into question by the NCTL Panel when discontinuing the case. A detailed discussion of the evidence presented in the NCTL case is provided in chapter 9 of John Holmwood and Therese O'Toole's book on the Trojan Horse affair.

=== Ofsted and EFA allegations ===
Golden Hillock School, Nansen Primary School, Park View Academy – all run by the Park View Educational Trust – Oldknow Academy and Saltley School were placed in special measures after inspectors found systemic failings including the schools having failed to take adequate steps to safeguard pupils against extremism. Another school investigated, Alston Primary, was already in special measures. A sixth school was labelled inadequate for its poor educational standards and twelve schools were found needing of improvements. Three schools were commended.

Ofsted expressed concerns about an exclusively Muslim culture in non-faith schools and children not being taught to "develop tolerant attitudes towards other faiths". The inspections found that head teachers have been "marginalised or forced out of their jobs". Ofsted found that the curriculum was being narrowed to reflect the "personal views of a few governors". Teachers reported unfair treatment because of their gender or religious beliefs. Ofsted found a breakdown of trust between governors and staff and that family members had been appointed to unadvertised senior leadership posts

Park View Education Trust were found to be in breach of the Education Funding Agreement by failing to promote social cohesion, failing to promote the social, moral, spiritual, and cultural development of pupils, failing to promote balanced political treatment of issues, and failure to comply fully with safeguarding issues concerning criminal records checks.

Park View academy had been identified as outstanding in a 2012 Ofsted report, the first school to be inspected under a tougher new inspection regime introduced by then Secretary of State Michael Gove. Sir Michael Wilshaw, Chief Inspector at Ofsted, had commented at a national conference that "All schools should be like this and there's no reason why they shouldn't be."

==== Park View School ====
At Park View School, Ofsted reported that "students are not taught citizenship well enough or prepared properly for life in a multi-cultural and diverse society".

The EFA inspection found a classroom culture which was not welcoming to non-Muslim pupils. It described a "madrassa curriculum" and reported that "posters were written in Quranic Arabic in most of the classrooms visited. Posters were found in the classrooms encouraging children to begin lessons with a Muslim prayer, one saying: "If you do not pray, you are worse than a kafir", and staff reported that loudspeakers were set up in the school to broadcast a call to prayer. The few pupils that elected to study a Christianity unit as part of the Religious Studies GCSE course had to "teach themselves", because the teacher focused on Islamic studies which the majority were studying. The school staff defended the measures stating that the loudspeakers were put up to make announcements in general, not only the Islamic prayer call and that every school in Britain is legally required to provide a collective act of worship, which is usually Christian in nature but in their case was Islamic for which they applied for and received permission.

Year 11 pupils about to sit their GCSEs at the school were instructed to partake in an Islamic fast, taking neither food nor drink, to place them in the right "spiritual frame of mind" for the exams. Additionally, students were expected to fast during the month of Ramadan. Some staff at the school expressed fear that neither eating nor drinking amid high temperatures during the 18 hours of daylight in the months of June and July would compromise pupils' health and their ability to learn.

It was alleged that the sexes were segregated in the classrooms and boys and girls suspected of being too friendly towards each other were disciplined. The Department for Education inspection found the seating arrangements "often with boys sitting towards the front of the class and girls at the back or around the sides". The annual sports event for boys and girls was scheduled in different days. Girls claimed to have been discriminated against and said some were sent home from a tennis tournament because their dress was too "revealing".

Subjects such as Personal, Social and Health Education, Biology and Sex and Relationships Education were bowdlerised to conform with a conservative Islamic teaching. Pupils studying biology were not taught the section of the syllabus about reproduction and the teacher stated when briefly outlining evolution that "this is not what we believe". A former staff member said that one teacher had handed out a worksheet stating that women "must obey their husbands", and told his class that wives were forbidden from refusing their husbands sex. Pupils and teachers from Park View School denied this version of the story, saying that after this assertion had been raised by a boy during a presentation on sexual education teachers organised an assembly where they explained that "marital rape was legally and morally wrong".

A former teacher at the school reported that the current head teacher, Monzoor Hussain, expressed "mind-blowing" anti-American views at school assemblies, describing the US as the "source of all evil in the world". In school assemblies, former staff alleged that a senior teacher frequently praised Anwar al-Awlaki, an al-Qaeda recruiter that had been involved with at least three major terror attacks, and referred to non-Muslims as "kuffar", an insulting term for "infidel". The teacher also used school facilities to copy Osama bin Laden DVDs. External speakers were improperly vetted. An extended Islamic assembly for its Year 10 and 11 pupils was arranged with Sheikh Shady al-Suleiman, an extremist preacher who has called on God to "destroy the enemies of Islam", "give victory to all the Mujahideen all over the world" and to "prepare us for the jihad".

A teacher from Park View School was reported to the police after he broke into a female pupil's mobile telephone to prove she was having a "forbidden" relationship with a boy. The 16-year-old girl's phone was confiscated by the teacher during a Sunday event and then taken to a shop for its passcode to be broken, and its contents were then examined by the school. Texts and images of the girl with a boy, a fellow Year 11 pupil at Park View, were used to justify the girl's suspension weeks before her GCSE exams.

==== Golden Hillock School ====
Golden Hillock School in Sparkhill, Birmingham, was put under special measures by Ofsted on 5 June 2014, after being rated "inadequate" in all categories. The inspection said that "too little is done to keep students safe from the risks associated with extremist views". The Ofsted report stated that "students' understanding of other religions is scant as the religious education curriculum focuses primarily on the study of Islam" and said there was a "perceived unfairness and lack of transparency" over appointments to the school and that female members of staff had felt intimidated. Governors at the school banned any discussions regarding sexual orientation and intimacy. This affected the teaching of English, Art, Religious Education and Personal, Social and Health Education. Staff were prevented from teaching Sex and Relationships Advice freely as well as aspects of Safeguarding and Child Protection.

Forced segregation of the genders was observed in some classes at Golden Hillock and was mandated in some departmental policy documents.

On 9 June 2014, Lord Nash, Parliamentary Under-Secretary of State for schools, wrote to Tahir Alam concerning the OFSTED and EFA reports and outlined the actions required by the school.

In August 2014, the Principal Hardeep Saini was replaced by an interim principal. Two other senior teachers were also suspended.

In July 2015, Ofsted stated that Golden Hillock was still inadequate.

At the tribunal held in October and November 2015, Mr Saini was accused of advising a teacher who had been arrested for having extreme pornography to throw his mobile phone into the canal to make sure there was no problem.

As of September 2015, Golden Hillock School was rebranded Ark Boulton Academy after being taken over by the Ark Academy Chain.

==== Oldknow Academy ====
Ofsted found that a small group of governors were "endeavouring to promote a particular and narrow faith-based ideology in what is a maintained and non-faith academy". Staff were afraid to speak out about the significant changes. Ofsted stated that the school had failed to protect students from "the risks of radicalisation and extremism". The school's curriculum was deemed inadequate because it did not promote tolerance and harmony between different cultural traditions.

The Education Funding Agency (EFA) found that the school lacked a balanced and broad curriculum and saw several subjects marginalised. It found that non-Muslim staff were banned from assemblies in which the children were preached at and told that white women were "prostitutes". Children were urged to join in anti-Christian chants. Exchange visits with nearby churches had been curtailed. The EFA team concluded: "We saw evidence that Oldknow academy is acting as a faith school and is not making active efforts to make the academy attractive to all faith denominations including pupils of no faith."

Segregation was found in one classroom with girls sitting at the back with their heads covered. The school had spent £50,000 on three subsidised trips to Saudi Arabia so that pupils could visit the cities of Mecca and Medina in what the EFA described as "an extravagant use of public funds". Pupils and staff stayed in luxury five-star hotels. The contracts for the taxpayer-funded school trips never underwent a formal tender process, and instead a travel firm was used with close links to a current teacher and former director of the school. For three years running non-Muslim pupils and staff were excluded from these trips. Christmas events were cancelled and raffles and tombolas were banned at a recent school fete because they were considered un-Islamic. The summer play was criticised by staff for its "use of musical instruments" and a teacher was observed covering his ears during his music lesson. Some staff members admonished girls not to partake in school extracurricular visits and activities.

During the tribunal it emerged that a photo of a white person was shown to students as an example of what Christians look like. Students were also told that it is un-Islamic to have a pet dog.

==== Nansen Primary School ====
Pupils had limited knowledge of any religion apart from Islam. Effective strategies were not in place to deal with extremism and "governance, safety, pupils' cultural development, equal opportunities and the teaching of religious education are all inadequate". Ofsted found that "the governing body has removed some subjects, such as music, from the timetable". Inspectors found that no humanities, arts or music was taught in Year 6 and only "limited" teaching of these subjects in Year 5. The deputy head of Nansen Primary School, Razwan Faraz, leads a group called the "Educational Activists" which he says introduces an "Islamising agenda" in Birmingham state schools. He worked for a charity believed by the US to have links with terrorist organisations.

==== Saltley School and Specialist Science College ====
Ofsted found that the governing body interfered with the running of Saltley School and undermined the work of its senior leaders. It criticised the spending of the school's budget on paying private investigators to investigate the emails of senior staff and paying for meals in restaurants.

==== Olive Tree Primary School ====
The government ordered an inspection of the Olive Tree school following comments by its head, Abdul Qadeer Baksh, that in an ideal Islamic state, homosexuality would be punishable by death.

An Ofsted inspection found that the Islamic school, which shares its premises with a mosque, had books in its library with content that had "no place in British society". The books contained fundamentalist views and promoted executions, stoning and lashing as appropriate punishments. Books available to the children included one which advocated parents hitting children if they did not pray by the age of 10 and another which praised individuals who "loved death more than life in their pursuit of righteous and true religion". Additionally, the inspection stated that "there are too few books about the world's major religions other than Islam". Senior leaders did not ensure "balanced views of the world" were taught and that "contact with different cultures, faiths and traditions is too limited to promote tolerance and respect for the views, lifestyles and customs of other people". The school was rated "inadequate".

==== Laisterdyke Business and Enterprise College ====
During the inspection at Laisterdyke Business and Enterprise College in Bradford, a mainly Muslim secondary school, pupils were forced to revise for their GCSE exams outside in the street as staff did not want them to have an opportunity to speak to inspectors.

After resisting attempts by governors to impose an Islamic ethos, teachers were suspended and its principal, Jennifer McIntosh, and her deputy, faced attempts to oust them. It was alleged by teachers that the governors sought to hire the Trojan Horse "ringleader" Tahir Alam and model the school on his Park View School in Birmingham. The governors of the school were sacked in April because of inappropriate interference in the running of the school.

=== Clarke Report ===
An investigation ordered by the government found a "sustained, co-ordinated agenda to impose segregationist attitudes and practices of a hardline, politicised strain of Sunni Islam" in several Birmingham schools. However, the report interviewed none of the teachers or governors against whom allegations were made with the single exception of Tahir Alam. It also did not report any interviews with members of Birmingham Standing Advisory Council on Religious Education (SACRE) responsible for the agreed curriculum on religious education taught in local authority schools in Birmingham, and also responsible for approving deterninations of daily acts of collective worship for other than Christian worship. Nor did Clarke report any interviews with schools improvement officers at the local authority of the Department for Education. Indeed, in presenting his charges, Clarke commented that "it is only fair to point out that the Trust disputed most, if not all, of the allegations".

The investigation found there to be "no evidence to suggest that there is a problem with governance generally" nor any "evidence of terrorism, radicalisation or violent extremism in the schools of concern in Birmingham", but said there was "evidence that there are a number of people, associated with each other and in positions of influence in schools and governing bodies, who espouse, sympathise with or fail to challenge extremist views". It found that a number of governors and senior teachers had been promoting a form of Islamism or Salafism. The report identified the Muslim Council of Britain and the Association of Muslim Schools as organisations "[stemming] from an international movement to increase the role of Islam in education". This reflects the views of the neo-conservative Henry Jackson Society and included the description of a document intended to provide guidance about the needs of Muslim pupils in state schools as a "blueprint for Islamisation". It was entitled Towards Greater Understanding: Meeting the Needs of Muslim Pupils in State Schools. Information and Guidance for Schools and is available as an appendix to the Kershaw Report. Its intentions are clearly set out in the introduction where it states "its purpose is to promote greater understanding of the faith, religious and cultural needs of Muslim pupils and how they can be accommodated within schools. It also provides useful information and guidance and features of good practice in meeting those needs."

Peter Clarke, former counterterrorism chief, conducted the investigation which gathered and examined 2,000 documents and generated 2,000 pages of interview transcripts from 50 witnesses, including former headteachers, teachers, council staff and school governors. He said some of the witnesses had been very nervous and anxious. He found "very clear evidence" that young people were encouraged to "accept unquestionably a particular hardline strand of Sunni Islam that raises concerns about their vulnerability to radicalisation in the future". It described the ideology being promoted as "an intolerant and politicised form of extreme social conservatism that claims to represent and ultimately seeks to control all Muslims. In its separatist assertions and attempts to subvert normal processes it amounts to what is often described as Islamism." He conducted no interviews with governors or teachers who were accused of misconduct, with the exception of Tahir Alam. Nor did he report any evidence provided by school improvement officers at Birmingham City Council or the department for Education. Nor did he report the evidence of the secretary to Birmingham Standing Advisory Council on Religious Education (SACRE) that the scheme of Islamic collective worship at Park View had been in place since 1996 and had been regularly reviewed since then, and that the school was teaching the agreed local curriculum on religious education, despite not being required to do so as academies. This evidence would come to light when the NCTL misconduct case against senior teachers at PVET collapsed because the prosecution had failed to disclose material from the Clarke Report that it had had in its possession since the start of the proceedings.

==== Detailed allegations ====
The report outlined instances of Islamism or Salafism found in the schools. They included:

- Anti-Western rhetoric, particularly anti-US and anti-Israel;
- Segregationism – dividing the world into 'us' and 'them', with them to include all non-Muslims and other Muslims who disagree;
- Perception of a worldwide conspiracy against Muslims;
- Attempts to impose its views and practices upon others;
- Intolerance of difference, whether the secular, other religions or other Muslims.

===== Education and curriculum changes =====
The report found there had been changes made to the curriculum and education plans, including increasing the faith component. The choice of modern language teaching had been restricted to the study of Arabic or Urdu at several schools. At Park View, Golden Hillock, Nansen and Oldknow academy, it is alleged that teachers were instructed not to use images in any subject which displayed even slight intimacy between sexes. The investigation found that "terms such as condom, the pill and so forth have been banned" and that governors had insisted on an Islamic approach to subjects, such as Personal, Social and Health Education, science, religious education, and sex and relationships education. Governors also restricted teaching topics which were part of the Department for Education's Prevent strategy, such as forced marriage and female genital mutilation. No evidence was provided to substantiate these claims. Creationism was taught as fact in school assemblies and science lessons at both Park View and Golden Hillock. Children were banned from playing musical instruments and drama lessons were dropped from the schedule. The art curriculum was altered to "remove full faces or immodest images, such as paintings by Gustav Klimt".

These claims by witnesses were unsubstantiated. The educational advisers to the Clarke Report did not set out the guidelines applying to religious education and collective worship in schools and no information was provided about the locally agreed SACRE curriculum which continued to be taught in the schools. The school had a determination from the local SACRE to provide Islamic collective worship since 1996. Responsibility for determinations for academy schools passed to the Department for Education, but they put in place no measures for renewing determinations. The Department for Education had also commissioned a report by Ipsos Mori in 2010 into how schools understood their duties with regard to Community Cohesions and Prevent. This showed that most schools conflated the two and did not have teachers trained in the Prevent duty. Park View was more compliant than would be the case for other schools. In addition, Park View had been designated a National Healthy School for its approach to Personal, Social and Health Education.

===== Intolerance and racism =====
The report found evidence of intolerance at several schools toward gay, lesbian, bisexual and transsexual people, and said that governors and staff exhibited openly homophobic behaviour. Staff wishing to discuss LGBT matters were lambasted by governors.

The investigation found that at Anderton Park Primary School, after a white child joined the school, a Muslim parent instructed staff: "get a white chair and white desk and put the white kid in a white corner with a white teacher and keep him away from the others. If that fails get rid of the white kid." A three-year-old in a nursery said that his family were poor because the Jews and Zionists had all the money.

Student ambassadors, known as "religious police" by some staff, are appointed at Park View to report "the names of staff or students who exhibit behaviours deemed unacceptable by conservative Muslims".

==== Park View Brotherhood ====
The investigation obtained 3,000 messages, spanning 130 pages of transcripts, of a private WhatsApp discussion between a group of teachers at Park View School called the Park View Brotherhood. The report stated the messages evidenced that the group had "either promoted, or failed to challenge, views that are grossly intolerant of beliefs and practices other than their own".

The discussions contained: "Explicit homophobia, highly offensive comments about British service personnel, a stated ambition to increase segregation at the school, disparagement of Muslims in sectors other than their own, scepticism about the truth of reports of the murder of Lee Rigby and the Boston Marathon bombing and a constant undercurrent of anti-western, anti-America and anti-Israel sentiment." The group promoted links to extremist speakers that betrayed "an Islamist approach that denied the validity of alternative belief", and some group members who believed that the murder of Lee Rigby was staged, encouraged other members to promulgate this view.

Figures in the group included Park View Headmaster Mozz Hussain, Deputy Head of Nansen Primary Razwan Faraz and Shahid Akmal, the Chairman of Governors at Nansen. In a discussion on 5 February 2014, a teacher at Oldknow and governor at Small Heath School, revealed that the group's favoured candidate had become the head teacher at Small Heath. Nasim Awan, a governor at Springfield, said that the "first agenda item" should be to apply for Islamic assemblies at the secular school. Faraz replied by saying that the new head "has to establish herself with minimum controversy for first six months", also referring to starting an eventual "Islamising agenda", but at the same time ensuring that the new head does not become a "coconut" in the process. Another participant in the discussion said that "JEWS" (emphasis in original) were making websites with false information on the Quran, while Abdul Malik, Deputy Head of Golden Hillock in Bradford wrote "Al-Islam will prevail over all other ways of life. Look at how [the] Muslim population is increasing in the UK."

==== Criticism of Birmingham City Council ====
The report concluded that based on the examination of emails and correspondence: "There is incontrovertible evidence that both senior officials and elected members of Birmingham council were aware of activities that bear a striking resemblance to those described in the Trojan horse letter many months before it surfaced."

It said that the council had been aware of the extremist activities as early as the end of 2012, and that discussions had taken place between officials as early as July 2013, half a year before the emergence of the Trojan Horse letter. Yet, "eight weeks after the letter was received there was no systematic attempt to deal with the issue". Instead, the report concluded, the council was focused on community cohesion. It said that there was never a serious effort to ascertain what was happening in school governing bodies, and that council's approach had been described as one of "appeasement and a failure in their duty of care towards their employees".

These claims by witnesses were unsubstantiated. The educational advisers to the Clarke Report did not set out the guidelines applying to religious education and collective worship in schools and no information was provided about the locally agreed SACRE curriculum which continued to be taught in the schools. The school had a determination from the local SACRE to provide Islamic collective worship since 1996. Responsibility for determinations for academy schools passed to the Department for Education, but they put in place no measures for renewing determinations. The Department for Education had also commissioned a report by Ipso Mori in 2010 into how schools understood their duties with regard to Community Cohesions and Prevent. This showed that most schools conflated the two and did not have teachers trained in the Prevent duty. Park View was more compliant than would be the case for other schools. In addition, Park View had been designated a National Healthy School for its approach to Personal, Social and Health Education.

=== Kershaw Report ===
The report commissioned by Birmingham City Council and compiled by former head teacher, Ian Kershaw, concluded that school governors and teachers had tried to promote and enforce radical Islamic values and found evidence of extremism in 13 schools. It said that "manipulative" governors had been determined to introduce "unacceptable" practices and to deny students a broad and balanced education. It found evidence that the "five steps" to destabilise a school's leadership, as outlined in the original Trojan Horse letter, were "present in a large number of the schools considered part of the investigation". It said evidence pointed to a group of "British male governors and teachers, predominantly of Pakistani heritage".

The investigation, however, did not find evidence of a "conspiracy" to promote "violent extremism or radicalisation" values.

==== Criticism of Birmingham City Council ====
Mr Kershaw stated that the council had been "slow to respond" to allegations in the letter and said there was "culture within of not wanting to address difficult issues and problems with school governance" for risk of incurring accusations of racism or Islamophobia. The report said that the extremism went unchallenged as the council prioritised community cohesion over "doing what is right".

==== Extremism ====
The report found that attempts were made to introduce Sharia law in schools. There were posters in schools warning the children that if they did not pray, they would "go to hell". Girls were taught they could not refuse sex with their husbands, and would be "punished" by angels "from dusk to dawn" if they did. Teachers taught the children at Park View Academy that "good" Muslim women must wear a hijab and tie up their hair.

In an incident that was referred to counter-terrorism police, a teacher told the pupils at the Golden Hillock school "not to listen to Christians as they were all liars". Another teacher told the children that were "lucky to be Muslims and not ignorant like Christians and Jews".

At Nansen School, Islamic religious assemblies were introduced and Christmas and Diwali celebrations were cancelled. The study of French was replaced by Arabic. At the Oldknow academy, children were asked whether they believed in Christmas and encouraged to chant "no we don't" in response. The pupils were told at an assembly not to send Christmas cards and that Mary was not the mother of Jesus.

Kershaw revealed to MPs at the Commons select committee on education in September 2014 that at one school "a film about violent extremism" was shown to the children. In fact, this film was a BBC Panorama programme, a copy of which had been made at the request of West Midlands Police, to show at a session they were providing for the school on the dangers of radicalisation.

==== Criticism of the report ====
Russell Hobby, the general secretary of the National Association of Head Teachers said the organisation could not fully endorse the report. He said that its conclusions did not reflect the full reality in schools, and that discrepancies between this and the governmental report were "regrettable and unhelpful". He said that Birmingham City Council had limited its process and terms of reference "in a way which excludes critical evidence", that it had employed "too narrow a definition of extremism" and that the governmental report had reached a very different set of conclusions by accessing a different evidence base.

== Response ==
=== Political ===
Prime Minister David Cameron declared that refusing to accept British laws and way of life was "not an option"

Prime Minister David Cameron, on a visit to Birmingham, praised his government's swift action in investigating the conspiracy. He said that "protecting our children" was "one of the first duties of government" and convened an emergency meeting of the Extremism Taskforce and a ministerial meeting to discuss the affair. He announced proposals to send Ofsted to any school without warning, saying that the schools in question had been able to stage a "cover-up" previously.

Former Prime Minister Tony Blair said that the Trojan Horse plot was driven by the same Islamic extremism as that of Boko Haram, the Nigerian terrorist group. He said that the efforts to instil fundamentalist practices into Birmingham classrooms were based on a "warped and abusive view of the religion".

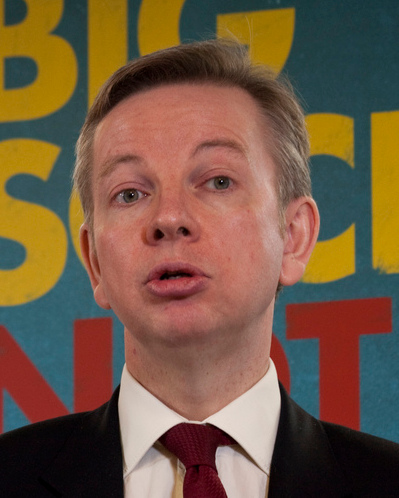
Michael Gove, Secretary of State for Education, announced after the investigation that schools must promote "British values"

Michael Gove, the Education secretary, announced that all of England's schools would have to promote "British values" of tolerance and fairness and that teachers would be banned from the profession if they allowed extremists into schools. This would be so despite the fact that the previous duty on schools to promote community cohesion had included an emphasis on 'shared values' which were exactly the same values espoused in the new duty. New clauses were added into funding agreements for academies, stating that the Secretary for Education could close schools whose governors do not comply with "fundamental British values".

Harriet Harman, the shadow Culture Secretary, urged the Culture Secretary, Sajid Javid, to protect music from being dropped from school curriculums after learning this had taken place at one of the investigated schools.

Deputy Prime Minister and leader of the Liberal Democrats Nick Clegg also backed the investigation, stating that schools should not become "silos of segregation". Later, he was critical of the Conservatives' plan to teach "British values", claiming that it would alienate moderate Muslims.

In a letter to Park View Trust chairman Tahir Alam, Education Minister Lord Nash criticised its running of the schools, saying he was "deeply mindful of the need to eliminate discrimination, advance equality of opportunity and foster good relations". He said the government would be terminating its funding arrangement with three of the schools.

Members of Parliament of all three major parties in Birmingham wrote a joint letter for an inquiry. Khalid Mahmood, the Labour MP for Perry Barr, said that the City Council may have known of previous plots, but not acted due to fears of being seen as anti-Islamic. Mahmood, said that he felt that it was certain that "Salafists" were attempting to change the school's secular nature and "split young people away from their parents". He accused Tahir Alam, chairman of the Park View Educational Trust, of "planning this for 15 years" and honing in Birmingham tactics that he had drafted in his 72-page document, published by the Muslim Council of Britain in 2007, on how to subvert schools to fundamentalist Islam. Mahmood told Channel 4 that he did not believe that the investigation was Islamophobic, stating "Over 200 people complaining to the local authority about what's gone on and you can't really claim that it's a witch-hunt". When the reports were published, Mahmood said that scepticism of the original letter could be "put in the bin", but some people still had "their heads buried in the sand".

After the reports were published, Liam Byrne, Labour MP for Birmingham Hodge Hill, said that cultural division in Birmingham had been caused by the rhetoric of the government, and "[Birmingham]'s school system is so fragmented it feels at times likes the Balkans".

In May, David Blunkett announced that if in government again, the Labour Party would appoint an 'Independent Director of School Standards' with the power to monitor academies: "In April 2014, the alleged Operation Trojan Horse in Birmingham demonstrated the difficulties that have arisen from this 'absence of transparency'".

The Labour MP for Poplar and Limehouse, Jim Fitzpatrick, warned of a 'Trojan Horse'-style Islamist plot to infiltrate councils in London. He said that "the Trojan Horse in east London was a political one rather than an educational one" and spoke of racial politics taking hold. He noted that in Tower Hamlets, a borough in which 32 per cent of the population is Bangladeshi, the Tower Hamlets First Party, of which the Mayor was a member, had 18 councillors who were all Bangladeshi, and 17 of them were men.

Salma Yaqoob, a former Birmingham City Councillor and prominent Muslim spokesperson, began a group named "Hands Off Birmingham Schools" in the aftermath of the inspections, saying that they were influenced by "a climate of political and media hysteria".

==== Political row between Home Office and Department for Education ====
In June 2014, there was a highly public argument between the Home Office and Department for Education ministers about the responsibility for the alleged extremism. The Prime Minister, David Cameron, intervened, requiring that Secretary for Education Michael Gove apologise to the Office for Security and Counter-Terrorism head Charles Farr for briefings critical of him appearing in The Times, and Home Secretary Theresa May to sack a close adviser, Fiona Cunningham, known to be in a relationship with Farr, who was found by a Downing Street inquiry to have been the source of a negative briefing against Gove.

=== Unions ===
The National Union of Teachers (NUT) demanded a full review of academies after the letter was revealed, expressing that political and religious groups had exploited the status at thousands of schools to indoctrinate children. The National Association of Head Teachers (NAHT) has also expressed concerns about the scope of the problem in other major cities, whilst advising that there was no "cause for panic". The general secretary of the headteachers' union, Russell Hobby, said the union has found "concerted efforts" by hardliners to infiltrate Birmingham schools, and that it was working with 30 of its members in 12 schools and had "serious concerns" about some of them.

=== Birmingham City Council ===
Sir Albert Bore, the leader of Birmingham City Council, called the original Trojan Horse letter "defamatory" and "hugely difficult to investigate" and offered protection to the whistleblower if they would come forward to help in the investigation. He later said that the Council accepted the Ofsted findings that schools in the city were failing pupils. The council's Chief Executive, Mark Rogers, said that there was no plot, but that "new communities" had raised "legitimate questions and challenges" to the "liberal education system".

In July 2014, after the reports had been published, Bore apologised and admitted that the council had ignored Operation Trojan Horse due to "fear of being accused of racism".

=== Schools ===
David Hughes, a trustee at Park View School, claimed that Ofsted's investigation of the school was biased, and dubbed the inspection a "witch hunt". Tahir Alam, a governor at Park View School since 1997, and former chair of the education committee of the Muslim Council of Britain, said that the accusations had been "motivated by anti-Muslim, anti-Islam sentiment". The Muslim Council of Britain also described the investigation as a 'witch hunt'. Waseem Yaqub, former Head of Governors at Al-Hijrah school, called it "a McCarthy-style witch-hunt" and that the letter was used by councillors "to turn on [Muslims] and use Muslims as scapegoats".

Helena Rosewell, a music teacher at Park View for 15 years, stated that her "blood [was] boiling" when investigations started at the school. However, she admitted that senior staff had warned her not to let pupils dance to pop or Bollywood music. Assistant principal Lee Donaghy, a self-declared agnostic, said that the school was achieving more by "accommodating" Muslim practices, but called it "pernicious" the idea "that people running the school are trying to force more religion on these kids than the parents want".

On reaction to Gove's call for British values in schools, the Muslim Council of Britain expressed fear that it would effectively bar conservative Muslims from becoming school trustees or governors.

Governors resigned from Saltley School in protest after the Ofsted findings were released, stating that they doubted the inspectors' impartiality.

Tahir Alam, chair of governors at Park View and labelled by some newspapers as the "ringleader" of Operation Trojan Horse, resigned alongside all of his board of trustees on 15 July. He denied all allegations against him.

=== Media ===
Media coverage of Operation Trojan Horse was varied.

Andrew Gilligan of The Daily Telegraph wrote extensively on the episode. He criticised the approaches to the story by the BBC and The Guardian, which he claimed were unduly biased in favour of the schools. Pieces in The Guardian included criticism of the academy system, and demands that all state schools be made secular. The latter piece concluded that in the present system, the schools investigated could have registered themselves as faith schools and been allowed to teach Islamic values with permission from the state. The Guardian also analysed Michael Gove's book on combatting Islamist terror, Celsius 7/7, pointing out that a chapter is titled "The Trojan Horse". The Guardian also revealed that West Midlands Police was investigating whether the alleged plot was a hoax concocted to support one of the schools named in the plot, Adderley primary school, in an industrial dispute.

In July 2014, Channel 4's investigative programme Dispatches aired an episode titled "No Clapping in Class" on the issue of faith schools. It interviewed Mohammed Zabar, a Muslim parent who wrote to the Prime Minister in December 2013 about the lack of cultural balance in the curriculum at his daughter's school, Oldknow. A member of staff at Park View also alleged that the school had handed out worksheets stating that wives can not refuse to have sex with their husbands, a claim that the school denied. The show also found evidence of unregistered Haredi Jewish schools in London, which an ex-pupil claimed were not teaching a balanced curriculum.

A play about the Trojan Horse affair and the injustices at its heart by LUNG Theatre (Helen Monks, co-writer; Matt Woodhead, co-writer and director) won the Amnesty International Freedom of Expression Award at the Edinburgh Festival Fringe in August 2018 and began a national tour in October 2019.

In January 2022, a new podcast by The New York Times, The Trojan Horse Affair, cast many doubts on the multiple investigations and the version of events that emerged. Across eight episodes, journalists Brian Reed and Hamza Syed sought to discover the author of the anonymous letter that triggered the scandal. Adderley primary school is at the centre of the podcast's investigations.

==== Daily Mirror exposé ====
An undercover reporter working for the Daily Mirror posed as a wealthy businessman and potential client of the training firm Exquisitus, a firm owned by Shahid Akmal, the chairman of governors at Nansen Primary School. The reporter recorded a series of meetings with him which the Mirror alleged exposed Akmal as a "sexist, racist bigot".

Akmal was recorded saying that "white women have the least amount of morals" and since women were "emotionally weaker" than men, their role was to look after children and the home. Akmal criticised female politicians, saying: "She has to sacrifice her family, she has to sacrifice her children, she has to sacrifice her husband, all in the name of equality." He claimed that girls should be taught cooking and sewing while boys should be taught trades.

He claimed that white children were lazy. He said that the "colonial blood" within white people was "very difficult to get rid of that very quickly", as British people "still think they rule half the world".

Akmal said that jailing gay people and adulterers was a "moral position to hold" and that they should be exiled from the community. He said "man-made" British laws were "very confusing", unlike those "given by God", which were fair.

=== Reinstatement of headteachers ===
The headteacher of Oldknow Academy, Bhupinder Kondal, handed in her notice in January 2014. Ms. Kondal alleged she had been the victim of undue and unlawful pressure to resign her position by both parents and governors. The previous trustees of the academy having been replaced, she withdrew her resignation and returned to her post on 19 August 2014. Speaking after withdrawing her resignation, Ms. Kondal said: "The pressures outlined in the Trojan Horse letter are very real and it mustn't be allowed to happen again." Shabina Bano, chair of the Oldknow Academy Parents' Association, said parents would welcome Ms. Kondal back because they wanted

stability as soon as possible ... At the same time we want to know why she deserted parents. These questions have been left unanswered ... She has not been held to account. The governors have been made to resign ... Has she come back because she wants to take the school forward or is she fulfilling a personal vendetta?

Ms. Bano had previously been highly critical of the terms of the inspections of the school, claiming that "[My children] never knew words like radicalisation, but have now been exposed to them." Bhupinder Kondal left the school again shortly after.

=== Other ===
In 2017, the academic scholars Therese O'Toole and John Holmwood, who served as an expert witness in the professional misconduct cases, described the Trojan Horse affair as a "false narrative" spread by a hostile British press which led to "a serious miscarriage of justice" against the teachers, drawing comparisons to the Hillsborough affair.

== Aftermath ==
In May 2015, the National Association of Head Teachers' annual conference heard that the problems associated with Operation Trojan Horse persisted, and there were claims that teachers had received death threats for attempting to dissuade students away from homophobia. Responding to those claims, Education Secretary Nicky Morgan said that there was no place for extremism in education, and there was still more work to be done to eradicate it. "This is a reminder that this is a serious issue and something that is not going to be solved overnight. We have taken action to remove and continue to take action to remove people from being in schools who don't follow British values."

== National College of Teaching and Leadership (NCTL) hearings ==
The first opportunity for teachers to challenge the claims came when hearings against them for professional misconduct brought by the NCTL were begun in September 2015 over a year after the story about the affair first broke.

Case hearings in July and August 2015 took place to establish the nature of the charges to be put and evidence to be submitted (in the case of the senior teachers at PVET, the evidence file expanded from around 1,000 pages to 6,000 pages between the two meetings). No charges of extremism were put forward, only charges associated with 'undue religious influence'. This was after the government had cited the Trojan Horse affair as justification for its new plans to counter extremism.

The hearings were expected to be concluded quickly, but continued through until May 2017. The rush to set up the hearings in July and August 2015 (prior to the Conservative Party conference in September) provided little time for the preparation of the case for the defence prior to the start of the hearings in contrast to the long-drawn-out nature of the proceedings once they had started.

Arrangements for the hearings were deeply unsatisfactory, with four separate cases brought against different groups of teachers associated with PVET and one other school, Oldknow Academy (which it transpired had a Memorandum of Understanding with PVET, signed at the behest of the Department for Education). Three cases against junior teachers were heard separately from that against the senior leadership team at PVET. The drawn out nature of the cases meant that there were no journalists present to report the detailed rebuttal of claims indicated above, for example of banning Christmas celebrations, or teacher handouts promoting the obligations on wives to consent to sex with their husbands.

The hearings dramatically came back into media attention in October 2016 after one of the hearings that had concluded with guilty verdicts against two teachers went to the High Court on appeal. The findings were quashed on grounds of serious procedural irregularities. Mr Justice Phillips declared that evidence for the defence presented in the hearing against the senior leadership team should have been made available to the defendants in the other case.

A further comment by Mr Justice Phillips is noteworthy. At paragraph 37 of his judgement, he writes that

the Panel expressly stated in each decision, when pronounced on 9 February 2016, that the allegations were "in no way concerned with extremism". It appears that this wording troubled the Head of the Department for Education's Due Diligence and Counter Extremism Group, Hardip Begol. He asked for publication to be delayed pending "clarification". With the apparent agreement of the Chair of the Panel, the decisions were amended prior to publication so as to state that the allegations ... were "in no way concerned with violent extremism".

The charge of failure to disclose documents from the main hearing against senior teachers in other hearings, however, indicated a possibility of a similar failure on the part of NCTL to fulfil its obligations of disclosure in the hearing against senior leaders. The Panel had been ready to announce its decision in the case on 23 December 2016, but an urgent application for disclosure, relating, in part, to transcripts associated with the Clarke Report, was made by defence lawyers on 24 November 2016. Media reporting expressed alarm that the transcripts were those of 'whistleblowers' who had provided statements under terms of confidentiality.

However, what was at issue also included other documents outside the Clarke Report that had potentially been relevant to the case. Altogether the documents that were deemed to be relevant amounted to about 1600 pages. As set out in the Panel Report, this included evidence an inspector from the EFA Report who had acted as adviser to the Clarke Report about the circumstances of the EFA inspections where the Panel proposed that "no doubt it would be argued that this further undermined her credibility and the reliability of her evidence" (see paragraphs 124/125 of the Panel's justification of discontinuing). There was evidence from officials at the Department for Education responsible for managing the incorporation of schools into PVET, as well as initiating a memorandum of agreement between PVET and Oldknow (paragraph 123). It also included evidence from then secretary to Birmingham SACRE, given to the Clarke inquiry but not reported by him, which "conflicts with the evidence of NCTL witnesses who had been saying that it was wrong for collective worship to be solely about Islam when a school had a determination but [the secretary] who had been with SACRE for 9 years, said it was acceptable" (paragraph 125).

Initially, the failure to disclose the transcripts was explained as a "departmental misunderstanding", albeit one, according to the Panel, where, "even on that basis such failure was simply unacceptable". However, it transpired that, just before the Panel was due to rule on 3 May 2017 on an application by the defence lawyers to discontinue, the NCTL presented a note from their solicitors. This stated that, on 14 October 2014, they had received "25 of the Clarke transcripts to include transcripts of 10 interviewees who went on to be witnesses for the NCTL in these proceedings. This pre-dated by approximately 3 1/2 months the date on which the witness statements were signed and finalised". This led the Panel to conclude that the matter had not been a misunderstanding, but that the transcripts were "deliberately withheld from disclosure". In consequence, the Panel judged that the matter was "an abuse of the process which is of such seriousness that it offends the Panel's sense of justice and propriety. What has happened has brought the integrity of the process into disrepute".

The case against the senior leaders was discontinued, as were the remaining two cases in July 2017. Unlike the teachers, the lawyers involved in serious impropriety were not subject to professional misconduct charges despite the cost of the hearings. Teachers lost their livelihoods and a community had its reputation besmirched, yet their defence was neither fully heard nor reported. Government officials and policy advisers, as well as journalists previously involved in the case, rushed to announce that the cases had collapsed on a 'technicality'. For example, the co-head of the security and extremism unit at Policy Exchange (the conservative think tank that had advised Michael Gove's schools programme), Hannah Stuart, and its head of education, John David Blake, proposed that, "non-disclosure of anonymous witness statements from the Clarke inquiry was described as an 'abuse of process', and that is deeply unfortunate, but this falls short of an exoneration. The decision to discontinue disciplinary proceedings was based on procedural grounds – not on a shortage of evidence". No mention was made of the fact that allegations of extremism had not been any part of the charges against teachers. Jaimie Martin, former special adviser at the Department for Education, wrote, "as [the teachers] were not tried for the charges, they were therefore not cleared of them", and that "people who downplay the seriousness of Trojan Horse, claiming those involved exhibited 'mainstream' Islamic views, are guilty not only of stunning naivety, but of a dangerous error".

The academic scholar John Holmwood, who served as an expert witness in the professional misconduct case brought against the senior teachers at Park View Educational Trust, wrote a book with scholar Therese O'Toole about the Trojan Horse affair, Countering Extremism in British Schools? The Truth about the Birmingham Trojan Horse Affair (2017). They described the Trojan Horse affair as a "false narrative" spread by a hostile British press which led to "a serious miscarriage of justice" against the teachers, drawing comparisons to the Hillsborough affair.

== See also ==
- Islamism in the United Kingdom
- Al-Madinah School, Muslim academy investigated in 2013 over allegations of discrimination and subsequently shut down
- Sharia patrols (London), vigilante gang convicted in 2014 of violently enforcing Islamic principles in East London
