= Ark Boulton Academy =

Location
- Golden Hillock Road; Birmingham, West Midlands, B11 2QG; England; 52°27′25″N 1°51′39″W

Information
- Type: Academy
- Established: 1 September 2015
- Trust: Ark
- Department for Education URN: 140014 Tables
- Ofsted: Reports
- Principal: Laurence Cole
- Gender: Coeducational
- Age: 11 to 16
- Website: arkboulton.org

Ark Boulton Academy, formerly Golden Hillock School, is a coeducational secondary school in Sparkhill in the south of Birmingham, England. It was opened in 1910 and has just under 900 pupils. The principal is Laurence Cole.

In 2014, the school was under investigation as part of Operation Trojan Horse for promoting radical Islamic views to pupils. Following this, in September 2015 the school joined the Ark network.

The school has a higher than average number of pupils eligible for free school meals. In 2015, Ofsted reported that all its pupils were from ethnic minorities, and the majority spoke English as an additional language. The school has an average number of students with special educational needs. The school was judged 'Good' by Ofsted in 2017.

== Notable former pupils ==
=== As Golden Hillock School ===
- Sid Field - actor
- Barry Squires - footballer
