= Helen Monks =

English writer, actress and comedian

- Born: 2 October 1992 (age 33); Birmingham, West Midlands, England
- Education: University of Sheffield
- Occupations: Actress, writer, comedian

Helen Monks (born 2 October 1992) is an English writer, actress and comedian. She is best known for her roles in Raised by Wolves, Upstart Crow, The Archers, Holby City, Genius, and Inside No. 9.

== Early life ==
Monks was born and raised in Birmingham. Both her parents work in theatre. Her brother is a theatre lighting designer.

When she was nine years old, Monks successfully auditioned for the Carlton Junior TV Workshop run by Colin Edwards and remained there until she left school.

== Career ==
In 2005, Monks became Birmingham's first Young Poet Laureate, aged 13. That same year she was cast in the radio soap-opera The Archers on BBC Radio 4, taking on the role of Pip Archer. She left the series in 2014.

Monks co-founded the Barnsley-based touring theatre company LUNG Theatre in 2012. Lung is "a political documentary theatre company that makes theatre with communities, by communities and for communities."

In 2015, Monks came third in the finals of the Funny Women Awards. Together with actress and writer Tilly Steele, Monks has been a co-host of the Bitchin' podcast since 2018.

Monks also appears in Ben Elton's BBC One sitcom Upstart Crow, Monks played the role of Susannah Shakespeare, daughter to David Mitchell's William Shakespeare.

She plays Charlotte opposite Miriam Margolyes in the BBC Radio 4 sitcom Charlotte and Lillian.

== Writing ==
Monks' radio plays include One Day, which won the BBC young writer's competition Radio Online in 2007 and The Chicken Salad of a Troubled Mind, which was made by the Wireless Theatre Company in 2013. Her stage play The Piano Man was performed at the Birmingham Rep as part of their Transmissions Festival 2008. Monks won the Taunton Young Writer's Award in 2014 and again in 2015 with her stage plays Pillow Talk and No Fishing. In 2015 she co-wrote E15 with Matt Woodhead about the Focus E15 campaign group. After winning a student drama award and being shortlisted for the Amnesty International Award, E15 went on a national tour with the Battersea Arts Centre. It has since been published by Oberon Books.

Her one-woman play Dolly Wants to Die premiered at the Edinburgh Fringe in 2016. In 2018, Monks co-wrote Trojan Horse with Matt Woodhead. The play explores the impact of the Trojan Horse inquiry into an alleged Islamist takeover of a number of inner city schools in the east of Birmingham on the city and the people affected by the inquiry. It premiered at the Edinburgh Fringe in 2018 and has won the 2018 Amnesty International Freedom of Expression Award and a Fringe First.

== Personal life ==
Monks earned a degree in English Literature and Theatre Studies from the University of Sheffield in 2014.

She admires the work of Caitlin Moran and David Mitchell, citing Mitchell as the reason that she got into comedy.

== Filmography ==
Year	Title	Role	Notes
2003	Red Sky at Night		TV short
2013–16	Raised by Wolves	Germaine Garry	Played one of the principal characters throughout the series.
2015	Holby City	Tallulah Hart	Season 17, episode 43: "A Good Man"
2016	The Last Kingdom	Gwen	
2016–present	Upstart Crow	Susanna Shakespeare	Appeared in all episodes as of Series 2
2017	Taboo	Zilpha's Maid	Series 1, episode 7
2017	Genius	Maja Einstein	Episodes 1–3
2017	Election Spy		
2018	Inside No. 9	Colette	Series 4, episode 1: "Zanzibar"
2019	Hold the Sunset	Stephanie Hugh	Series 2, episode 4: "The Lemming Family"
2020	Maxxx	Rose	
2020-21	Charlotte and Lillian	Charlotte	Radio sitcom: lead role, 3 series
2022	Elden Ring	Roderika	Voice
