= We Were Three =

Podcast about COVID-19 denialism

We Were Three is a podcast about COVID-19 denialism produced by The New York Times's podcast production company, Serial Productions. The podcast was hosted by Nancy Updike and was about Rachel McKibbens.

== Background ==
The podcast was Serial Productions' second release of 2022, following The Trojan Horse Affair. The show is hosted by Nancy Updike. The podcast contains three episodes that are each approximately 50 minutes in length. The music for the podcast was made by Soccer Mommy.

The podcast is about COVID-19 denialism. The podcast focuses on Rachel McKibbens and her relationship with her father and brother. Rachel investigates the last few months of her father and brother's lives. Rachel, her husband, and her children were all vaccinated, but her father and brother were not. Rachel's father died of COVID-19 and her brother died of COVID-19 two weeks later. The first episode discusses how Rachel tried convincing her brother to seek medical attention when he had COVID-19.
