= The Trojan Horse Affair =

2022 podcast

The Trojan Horse Affair is a 2022 podcast about the Trojan Horse scandal. The eight-episode series is hosted by Brian Reed, formerly a producer of This American Life and host of the podcast S-Town, and Hamza Syed, a reporter from Birmingham, in the UK, where the Trojan Horse scandal unfolded.

== Background ==
Syed, a former doctor attending journalism school, approached Reed after an event where Reed discussed his podcast S-Town. Syed pitched the idea of re-examining the Trojan Horse scandal, specifically to try to learn who had written the anonymous letter at the heart of the scandal, alleging a conspiracy by Muslims to take over schools for religious purposes. While the letter had become a national scandal in Britain, costing educators their jobs and affecting national policy, the subject of the letter’s provenance had gone mostly ignored. Syed felt that identifying the author would seriously revise the public understanding of the scandal, and thus Islamophobia in Britain broadly. Reed agreed to help him investigate. The work began as a story for This American Life, but expanded and was ultimately published by Serial and The New York Times.

== Episodes ==
All eight episodes debuted together on February 3, 2022.

Episode	Title	Description
1	The Letter in the Brown Paper Envelope	
2	The Case of the Four Resignations	
3	Sir Albert and the Missing "H"	
4	The Meeting and the Mole	
5	A Study in Scarlett	
6	Cucumbers and Cooker Bombs	
7	The Detail of the Deputies	
8	An Appointment in Perth	The pursuit of the story takes Brian and Hamza to Australia

== Reception ==
On Fresh Air, Nicholas Quah praised the podcast as “a thrilling audio documentary… It excels in bringing you inside the investigation. You feel the excitement of excavating a new document, a new lead, a new name." He also felt "the experience takes on a richer dimension when the series reveals itself to also be about the different ways of looking at the role of journalism in the world,” examining the different perspectives Syed and Reed bring to their reporting given differences in race, religion, nationality and professional backgrounds. In The Guardian, Alexi Duggins said, "The storytelling is as hooky as you’d expect, given it was part created by S-Town’s Brian Reed."

Also in the Guardian, Sonia Sodha said, “The Trojan Horse Affair presents a one-sided account that minimises child protection concerns, misogyny and homophobia in order to exonerate the podcast’s hero, a man called Tahir Alam”. Serial Productions sent a right-of-reply response to the Guardian prior to publication, which it claimed rebutted Sodha's arguments and which Vulture described as "largely ignored."

Writing in the Spectator, Birmingham Labour MP Khalid Mahmood (who was involved in the response to the original letter) said The New York Times "has blundered again, emboldening the worst elements of the community. Our city deserves better.”
