= Rockwood Academy, Birmingham =

Rockwood Academy
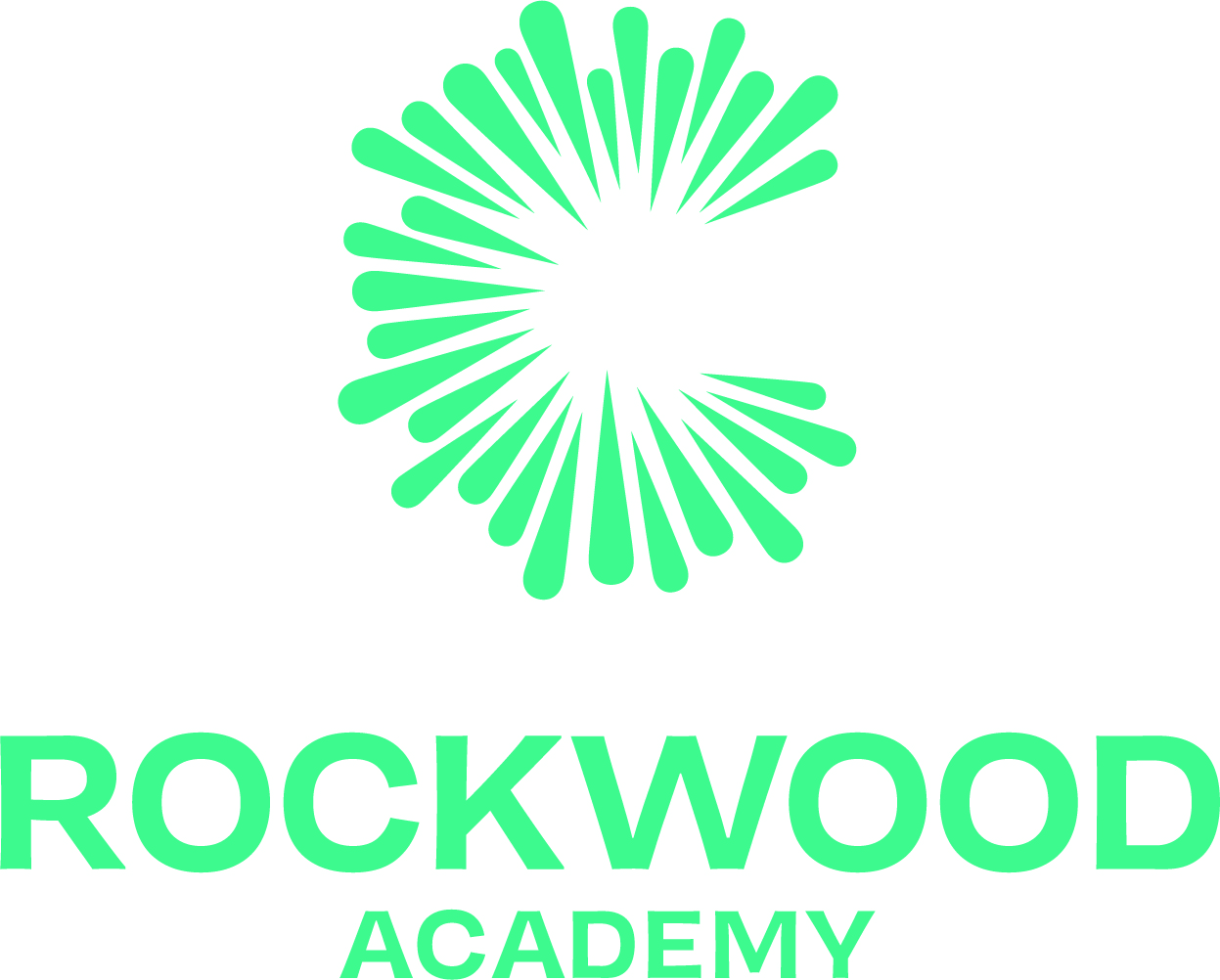

Location
- Naseby Road; Alum Rock; Birmingham, West Midlands, B8 3HG; England; 52.4906°N 1.8465°W

Information
- Type: Academy
- Established: 2022
- Trust: CORE Education Trust
- Department for Education URN: 138059 Tables
- Ofsted: Reports
- Gender: Mixed
- Age: 11 to 16
- Enrolment: 596
- Website: www.rockwood-academy.co.uk

Rockwood Academy (formerly Park View School) is a mixed secondary school located in Alum Rock, Birmingham. The academy is sponsored by CORE Education Trust. It was judged Good at an Ofsted inspection in 2016. A further Ofsted inspection in April 2025 found that the school had taken effective action to maintain the standards at its previous inspection. Inspectors described Rockwood Academy as a "productive and inclusive place of learning", with pupils responding well to the school's high expectations.

== History ==
The school was built in the 1960s and was known as Naseby School. In 1983 it became Park View School and was based over two sites. The Lower School was located on Naseby Road and Upper school was based in Park Hall School. The school became Park View Business and Enterprise School in 2005 and later was refurbished in the early 2010s under the Building Schools for the Future programme. The school was previously a specialist Business and Enterprise College; however, in 2013 it became an academy sponsored by Park View Educational Trust.

In 2014 the school was subject to an inquiry: see Operation Trojan Horse. The school was put under investigation by Ofsted. In 2015 the Education Funding Agency (EFA) found financial irregularities to the amount of £70,000, including a payment of £27,000 to a public relations firm without authorisation from the EFA. The EFA report alleged that money which had been allocated to the school under the government's pupil premium scheme — which is intended to help the most disadvantaged of children — was misused on public relations.

The school was renamed Rockwood Academy in September 2015, at the request of the children and their families. Rockwood is now sponsored by CORE Education Trust which has lifted the academy from special measures to 'Good' by Ofsted in 2016.
