= Carpenter's Road Lock =

Lock in Newham, London, England

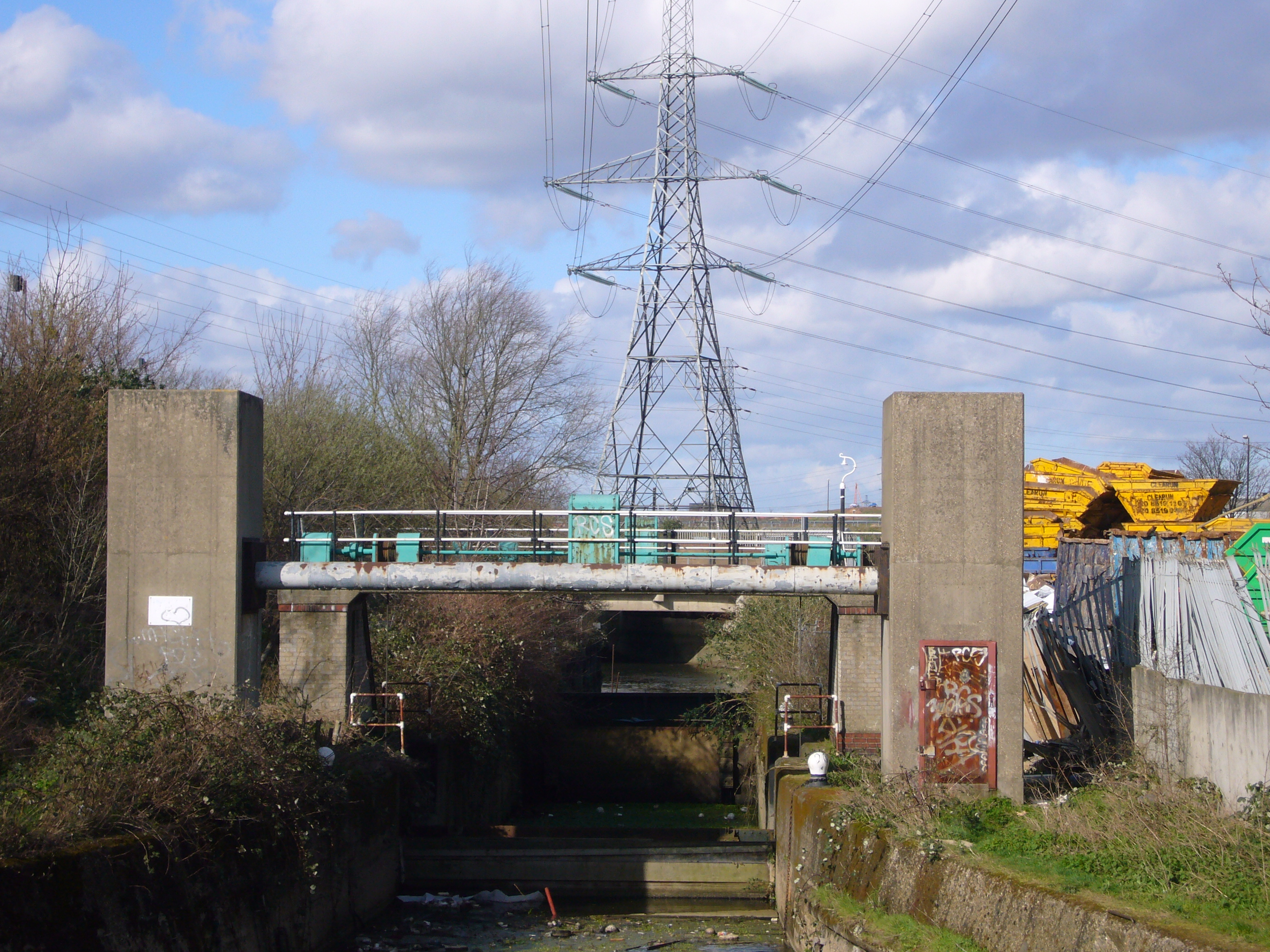
- Carpenter's Road Lock, seen from Marshgate Lane, before the construction of the Olympic Park
- 51.541774°N 0.016437°W
- Waterway: Bow Back Rivers
- County: Newham; Greater London
- Maintained by: Canal and River Trust
- Operation: automatic (original)
- First built: 1934
- Length: 92 feet (28 m)
- Width: 20 feet (6.1 m)
- Fall: was tidal

Carpenter's Road Lock is a rising radial lock in the London Borough of Newham, near Marshgate Lane in Stratford, England. It is located on the Bow Back Rivers and was constructed in 1933/34. It is the only lock in Britain with rising radial gates at both ends. British Waterways were hoping to restore it as part of the upgrade to Bow Back Rivers which took place for the 2012 Summer Olympics, but the gantries which enabled the gates to be raised were demolished to accommodate a wide bridge giving access to the main stadium. After the Games, most of the overbridge was removed. Funding for the restoration of the lock was in place by early 2016, and it is expected to be brought back into use in 2017.

== History ==
The Bow Back Rivers are a network of channels, which although they form a link between the River Lea and the River Thames, were never officially a part of the Lee Navigation. They were used commercially for navigation, but no tolls could be collected and there was no incentive to the trustees or conservators of the Lea to spend any money on their maintenance. Most of the channels had at various times been associated with water mills, and also formed an essential part of the flood relief system of the River Lea, but by the 1920s, they posed a flood risk to the surrounding area as they became choked. At the time, there were high rates of unemployment in the West Ham area, and the government had recently introduced an unemployment relief scheme. West Ham Corporation, working with the Lee Conservancy Board, applied for and received grants to enable major improvements to be carried out to the Bow Back Rivers. The work was authorised by the granting of an act of Parliament, the River Lee (Flood Relief) Act 1930 (20 & 21 Geo. 5. c. cxcii).

The work included dredging and reconfiguration of most of the channels, a new lock at Bow, rebuilding of Marshgate Lock on a new site further to the east, and the construction of a new lock at Carpenter's Road, at the northern end of the City Mills River. The whole project took around four years to complete, with work starting in 1931. Work on the lock itself, which was 92 feet (28 m) long and 20 feet (6.1 m) wide, began in 1933, and it was completed in 1934. It was built with rising radial gates at both ends. The use of rising radial gates was fairly common in continental Europe, but Carpenter's Road was the first use of them in Britain. The choice was dictated by the fact that the structure had to act both as a navigation lock and as a means of discharging flood water. It also had to be able to cope with variable water levels in both the City Mills River to the south, and the tidal Waterworks River to the north, where either one could be higher than the other. It was therefore built with two rising radial gates, one at each end.

The lock was built with a gantry over each of the gates, which housed the counterbalance weights and the operating mechanism. There were also steps up to the gantry, so that it provided a footbridge from one side of the lock to the other. Each gate, which formed an arc, could be raised out of the water in order to allow a boat to pass underneath it. A house for the lock keeper was completed by February 1935, and the lock was officially named Ward's Lock, after a local councillor, but soon became Carpenter's Road Lock. The lock house was demolished in 1967. Three other locks were built on the British canal system with rising radial gates, but this was the only one with such gates at both ends. Use of the Bow Back Rivers declined, and the last use of the lock by commercial traffic was in the 1960s. By the mid 1970s, both Carpenter's Road Lock and the new Marshgate Lock, by then known as City Mills Lock, were impassible and virtually derelict.

The lock controlled access to the northern section of the City Mill River, the southern approach being controlled by City Mills Lock. Two locks were needed as, when tidally controlled, there was insufficient headroom for barges passing beneath the Northern Outfall Sewer, which passes over the City Mill River.

=== Restoration ===
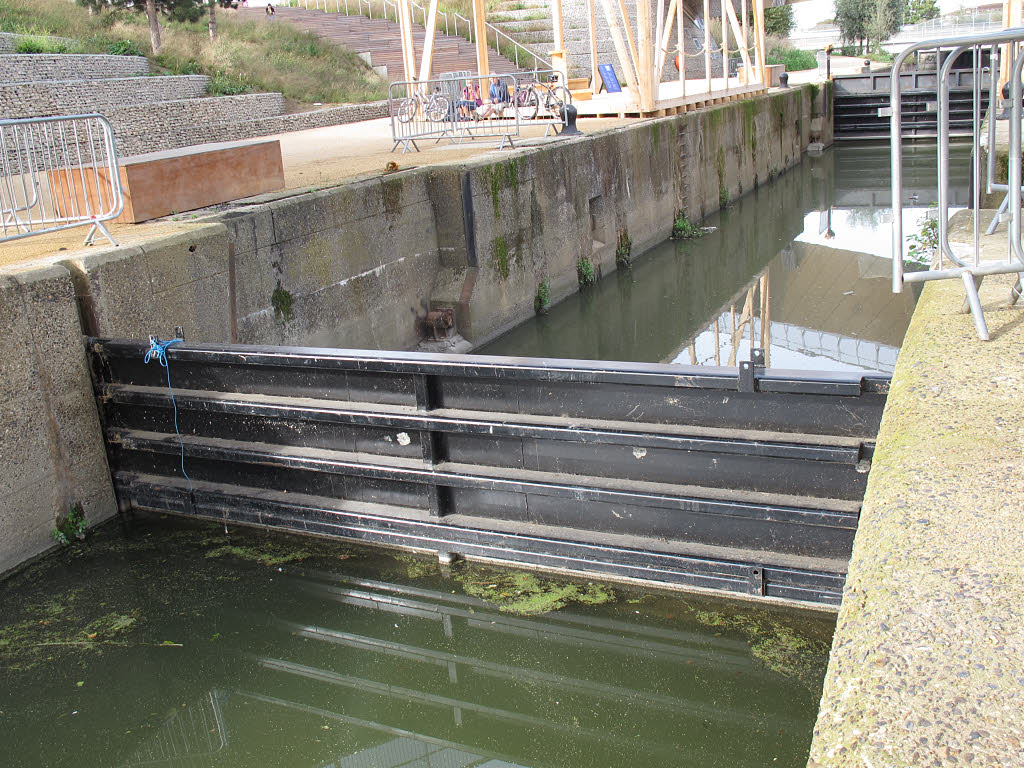
The gantries were demolished and the lock was blocked off with stop planks during the Olympic event

As a result of the passing of the Transport Act 1968, Bow Back Rivers were classified as a remainder waterway, meaning that no investment was likely to be made in them. However, in 2002, British Waterways decided that full restoration of the channels should be a national priority, and the Mayor of London ensured that this was included in the London Plan. By 2006, the International Olympic Committee had awarded the 2012 Games to London, and the chosen site for the main venues included most of the Bow Back Rivers. Initial restoration of City Mills Lock was completed early that year, In July 2006, the Olympic Delivery Authority sanctioned the building of a new lock on the Prescott Channel, which was subsequently named Three Mills Lock. Its purpose was to control water levels in the Waterworks River, maintaining them at a level where navigation was possible throughout the day. Previously, it had been a muddy creek at low tide, and at high tide, there was inadequate headroom to pass beneath the Northern Outfall Sewer, which crossed on a low bridge. The lock and associated flood defence structure were completed in 2009.

Once Three Mills Lock was operational, the Waterworks River was no longer tidal, and so water levels at Carpenter's Road Lock were more predictable. In 2010, British Waterways were hopeful that negotiations with High Speed 1 Ltd, who were operating the Channel Tunnel rail link, would result in £800,000 towards the cost of restoring Carpenter's Road Lock. This was part of a larger programme to ensure that the Stratford and Olympic areas were adequately drained. Little progress was made, and with the 2012 Olympic stadium sited about 100 metres (109 yd) south of the lock, on an island site between the Old River Lea and the City Mill River which branches just to the south of the lock, it was cosmetically restored and a wide bridge was constructed above the lock from Stratford City to the stadium. In order to accommodate the bridge, the gantries and ramps were demolished.

By early 2016, the wide bridge over the lock had been demolished, and replaced by much narrower structures, to allow the lock to be rebuilt. The Canal & River Trust, successors to British Waterways, approved a £1.75 million project to restore the lock in February 2016. Grants of £680,000 were received from the Heritage Lottery Fund, £100,000 from the London Legacy Development Corporation and £4,500 from the Inland Waterways Association. Restoration saw the gantries replaced, to accommodate the counterbalance weights, and two new radial rising gates installed. These enable the new structure to operate as a lock, and also to distribute flood water to the various channels in the Bow Back Rivers when the need arises. Operation of the gates to achieve this is automatic. Hyder Consulting managed the project, with Kier Construction carrying out the construction work. The new radial gates and control gear were designed by Kgal, and because there is limited headroom, they were built as a series of modules, each weighing less than 0.5 tonnes, which were assembled on site. During the Olympics, the underside of the bridge over the lock was covered in mirrors, and this feature has been retained on the new narrower structure. The job of manufacturing the gates, the new gantries and the controls was awarded to Mayflower Engineering of Sheffield. The gantries were clad in weathering steel, which forms a rust-coloured protective layer over time, and this is designed to contrast with the bridge over the lock, which is clad in stainless steel.

The gates were installed at the lock in mid-May, 2017. The reconstructed lock was formally opened as part of the first East London Waterways Festival, held over the August bank holiday. The event was attended by over 50 narrow boats and around 700 boaters, many using paddles or pedal-powered craft. All of the powered boats made a passage through the lock. One anomaly is that the 0.5-mile (0.8 km) stretch of the navigable River Lea to the north of Carpenter's Road lock is managed by Lea Valley Regional Park Authority, and they do not allow powered boats to use it.
