= Fish Island, London =

Area of east London, England

Coordinates: 51.538768°N 0.023850°W

Fish Island
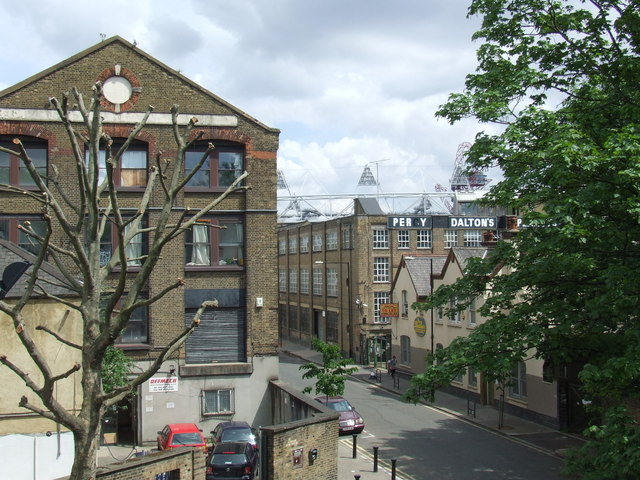
- View down Dace Road, Fish Island, with the London Stadium, over the River Lea, in the distance.

- Location within Greater London
- OS grid reference: TQ372841
  - Charing Cross: 4.5 mi (7.2 km) SW
- London borough: Tower Hamlets
- Ceremonial county: Greater London
- Region: London
- Country: England
- Sovereign state: United Kingdom
- Post town: LONDON
- Postcode district: E3, E20
- Dialling code: 020
- Police: Metropolitan
- Fire: London
- Ambulance: London
- UK Parliament: Stratford and Bow
- London Assembly: City and East

Fish Island is an area of east London, England. It is one of 58 designated conservation areas in the London Borough of Tower Hamlets, with many of its buildings considered important to Britain's industrial heritage, though there are no listed buildings in the area.

Regeneration and construction projects in Fish Island from 2016 onwards have caused the area to be referred to as "the new Shoreditch", in reference to the gentrification of that neighbourhood in the late 1990s.

Nearby Hackney Wick has a similar character to Fish Island and this sometimes leads to Fish Island being described as part of Hackney Wick, though they are in different boroughs.

Fish Island, despite its name, is not an actual island.

== Location ==
The area of Fish Island runs along the river Lea and borders the Queen Elizabeth Olympic Park to the east.

It is separated from Bow to the west by the A12 and its southern border is the intersection of the A12, the river Lea and the railway lines to and from Stratford.

According to the council's Fish Island Area Action plan, the area extends north past the Hertford Union Canal to border with the London Borough of Hackney along the Hackney Wick railway station.

The area of the Olympic park belonging to Tower Hamlets is also considered as part of Fish Island by the council, making it the north-easternmost part of the borough.

== History ==
=== Early history ===
Although it is thought the area has had human settlements since pre-historic times, evidence of human activity prior to the Roman period is sparse.

Evidence from the Roman period, however, is abundant. The exact nature of the Roman settlements is undetermined, though there is evidence that the area was occupied until the end of the 4th or 5th century and, according to the London and Middlesex Archaeological Society (LAMAS) "it produced large quantities of Roman pottery, coins, burials, ditches, pits and animal bones, particularly of cattle".

Pye Road, the main Roman road linking London to Colchester, passed through the area and would likely have crossed the river Lea at what is now Fish Island, though the nature or exact location of the crossing point is not fully understood.

Immediately after the Roman period, little is known of what became of the local settlements. In the Domesday Book of 1086, the wider area is known Old Ford and is listed as part of the Manor of Stepney and remained as such until at least the early 1300s.

At some point the Roman road and crossing will have fallen into disrepair, though the area remained the main crossing point between London and Essex until the early 12th century, at which point a stone bridge was constructed approximately half a mile downstream.

There are few historical references of the area from the medieval and post-medieval periods. The first known map of the area, from 1665, shows what is now Fish Island as an undeveloped marshland only sparsely populated.

=== Industrialisation ===
In the late 18th and early 19th century, the Hackney Cut and the Hertford Union Canal were cut into the local marshes and a series of railway lines were established through the area which precipitated the shift from rural to industrial. Crown Wharf, the oldest industrial site in the area, was developed from 1853 onwards, with a wallpaper works located there by E.M. Coley and an ironworks subsequently being established next door. Toxic processing plants for commodities such as crude oil and coal tar were set up along the Hertford Union Canal. These factories were soon followed by others using these materials to produce things like printing ink, rubber and dry cleaning. The waterways were a vital part of this industry, allowing for raw materials and finished products to be moved to and from the docks. It was at one point London's largest waterside industrial area.

In 1865, a 30-acre plot of surplus railway land in the area was purchased by the Imperial Gas Light & Co. in order to establish a new gasworks. However, a decision was made to set up the new works in a different location and so the land was sold on to the Gas Light and Coke Company (separate company). They instead used the land to build a factory town comprising a series of small houses and multi-storey factories and a network of new roads. These roads were given the names of fresh water fish (Dace, Bream, Roach) and, as the local area had been known to residents as "the Island", it eventually became known as Fish Island.

By the end of the 19th century, Fish Island had become an area of intense and diverse industrial activity, often dangerous or noxious in nature. At this time the area had a population of approximately 6,000 inhabitants, mostly consisting of local workers and their families and although local living conditions were improving towards the beginning of the 20th century, most residents of Fish Island lived in poverty and squalor in makeshift accommodation.

During World War II, Fish Island suffered extensive bomb damage with many of the buildings either completely destroyed or seriously damaged.

=== Post-war and recent regeneration ===
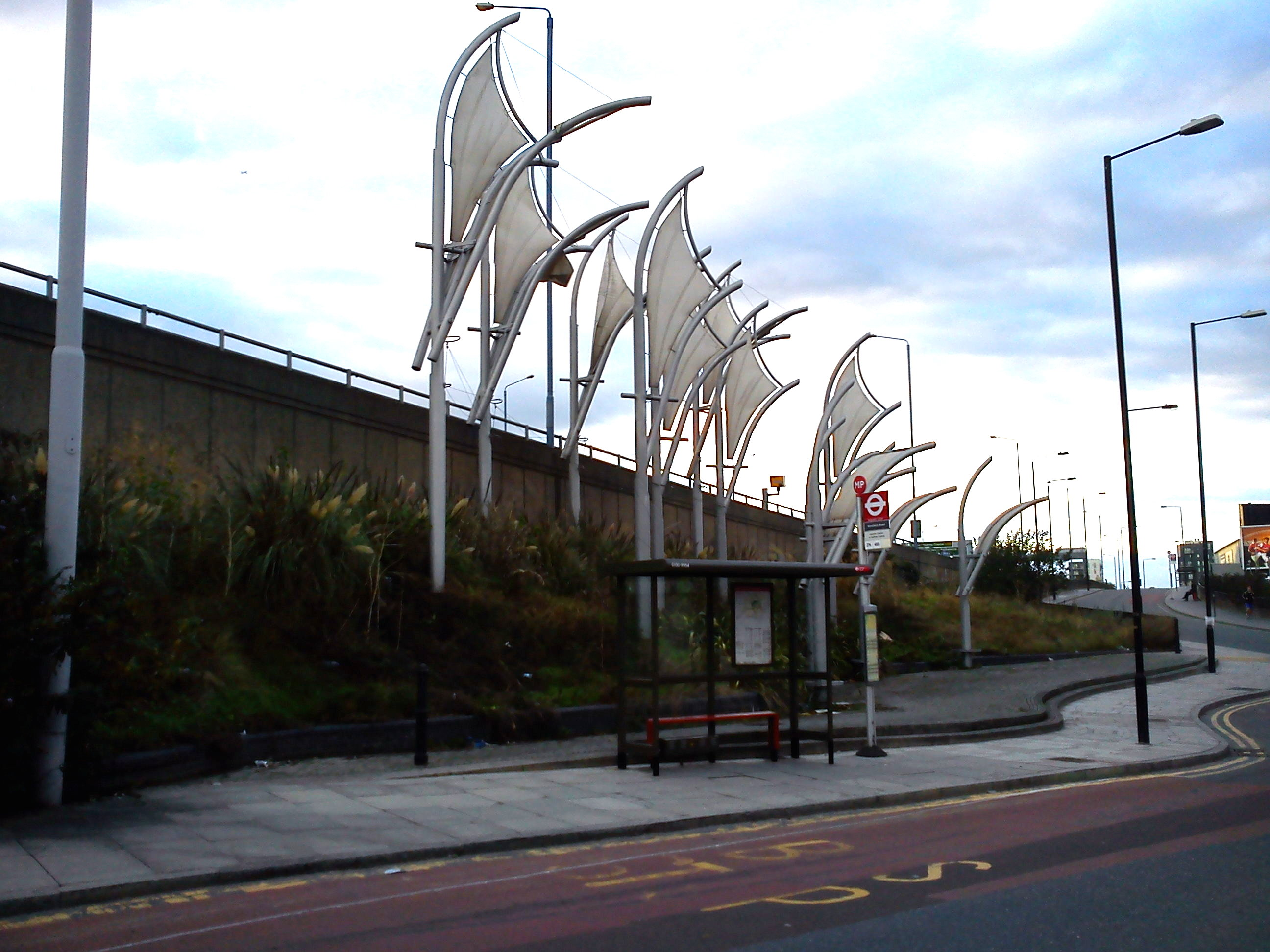
Fish tail sculptures at the junction of Monier Road and Wansbeck Road

Following the war, the area changed greatly as local industries shifted to "low employment uses", such as waste disposal, timber yards and warehouses, and much of the population left the area. Houses and local amenities were cleared and converted to industrial use. As a result, by the 1970s, the area became almost exclusively light industrial in nature and was virtually devoid of other uses, with many waste disposal sites and warehouses.

During the 1990s, the area saw an expansion of new creative industries and an influx of artists, who converted old and dilapidated warehouses into studios or lofts. It is claimed that the area had the highest density of artists in Europe in the 1990s and Fish Island, together with neighbouring Hackney Wick, became better known for its local art scene than its industry.

In the early 2000s, Fish Island received new attention given its proximity to the site of the Queen Elizabeth Olympic Park, the venue for the London 2012 Olympics. Local councils identified Fish Island, together with Hackney Wick, as key areas for regeneration as part of the development for the Olympic Games. As a result, the area saw the construction of a number of large residential and mixed use buildings, with more planned for completion in later years. This regeneration of the area and the associated increase in living cost and property prices led many to draw parallels with the gentrification of Shoreditch in the late 1990s, with the Daily Telegraph calling Fish Island "the new Shoreditch" in 2016.

== Governance ==
Fish Island falls within the London Borough of Tower Hamlets and the parliamentary constituency of Stratford and Bow. The electoral ward it falls within is the Bow East ward.

== Accessibility ==
The areas waterways are crossed by a number of bridges. The Hertford Union Canal is crossed by a footbridge called Roach Point Bridge, while the Lee Navigation is crossed by Carlton Bridge (also known as Monier Bridge) which carries Bassett Road across the river. The Lee Navigation is also crossed by a footbridge called Stour Bridge. There are also a number of bridges over the main branch of the River Lea, a short distance further east.

== In popular culture ==
Fish Island has a long tradition as a home to artists and art spaces. In 2009 the Island, and adjoining Hackney Wick, was found to have "one of the highest densities of fine artists, designers and artisans in Europe", with around 600 artists' studios in the area.

The London Centre for Book Arts has been based in the Britannia Works building, part of Space Studios, since 2012. The centre promotes book arts and artist-led publishing, with printing, binding and publishing facilities. The Heath Studio, a premier venue and art gallery, photography, fashion, commercial, and film projects. Dating back to 1853, the site originally housed a wallpaper works, followed by a paper staining operation in the 1860s. In 1873, it was taken over by Fredrick Layton Contractor, and by 1889, it became home to a Construction Ironwork Company, leading to its designation as the Iron Foundry from 1893. In 2014, a partnership between tech hub The Trampery and the Barbican Centre, led to the establishment of Fish Island Labs, a mentored art and technology project, which allowed 40 to 50 participants to share a low-cost workspace for ten months.

Channel 4’s The Big Breakfast was broadcast from the Lock Keeper's Cottage at Fish Island from 1992 to 2002.

== Nearest places ==
- Bow
- Hackney Wick
- Queen Elizabeth Olympic Park
- Stratford
- Old Ford
- Victoria Park
