= Mother Studios =

Organisation which provides work spaces for artists in London

Mother Studios is an organisation which provides work spaces for artists in London.

MOTHER STUDIOS in HACKNEY WICK, London and Colchester, Essex is an independent, non-profit, artist-run organisation. It was founded in August 2001 by artist Joanna Hughes for fine artists, designers and makers. In the site in London, there is 15,000 square feet of warehouse space housing 43 affordable, quality studio spaces. Since 2004, Mother Project and Exhibition space opened in Mother Studios – a 1,200 square foot space. The gallery space has also housed Elevator Gallery and Banksy. A second site for Mother Studios in Colchester, Essex was set up in 2015. The space is 14,000 square feet and is home to 34 studios.

The studios are based in Hackney Wick, along the River Lea and immediately opposite to the Olympic Site. The building, originally a warehouse, was built in 1910 and is typical for the style of the time. The studio spaces comprise situated on the top 3 floors of the building.

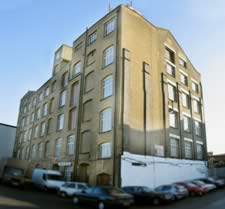
Mother Studios, 2004

== History ==
Mother Studios opened in 2001 by, and continue to be run by, artist Joanna Hughes. Mother Exhibition and Project space, opened in May 2004 and in recent years has hosted Elevator Gallery, The Lab Film Festival and a Banksy project. The Hackney WickED art festival was co founded by Joanna Hughes in 2008, and continued to be a director until May 2013. Many of its residents take part in the open studios element of the festival. In 2012 she moved on to set up and co found The Lab Film Festival along with Abbas Nokhasteh and Bill Howard.

Mother Studios in London closed in September 2016. Mother Studios Essex was sold to ACAVA studios in December 2017. This site is still a thriving creative arts community.
