= Lakeview Estate =

Housing estate in East London

Coordinates: 51°31′59″N 0°2′27″W

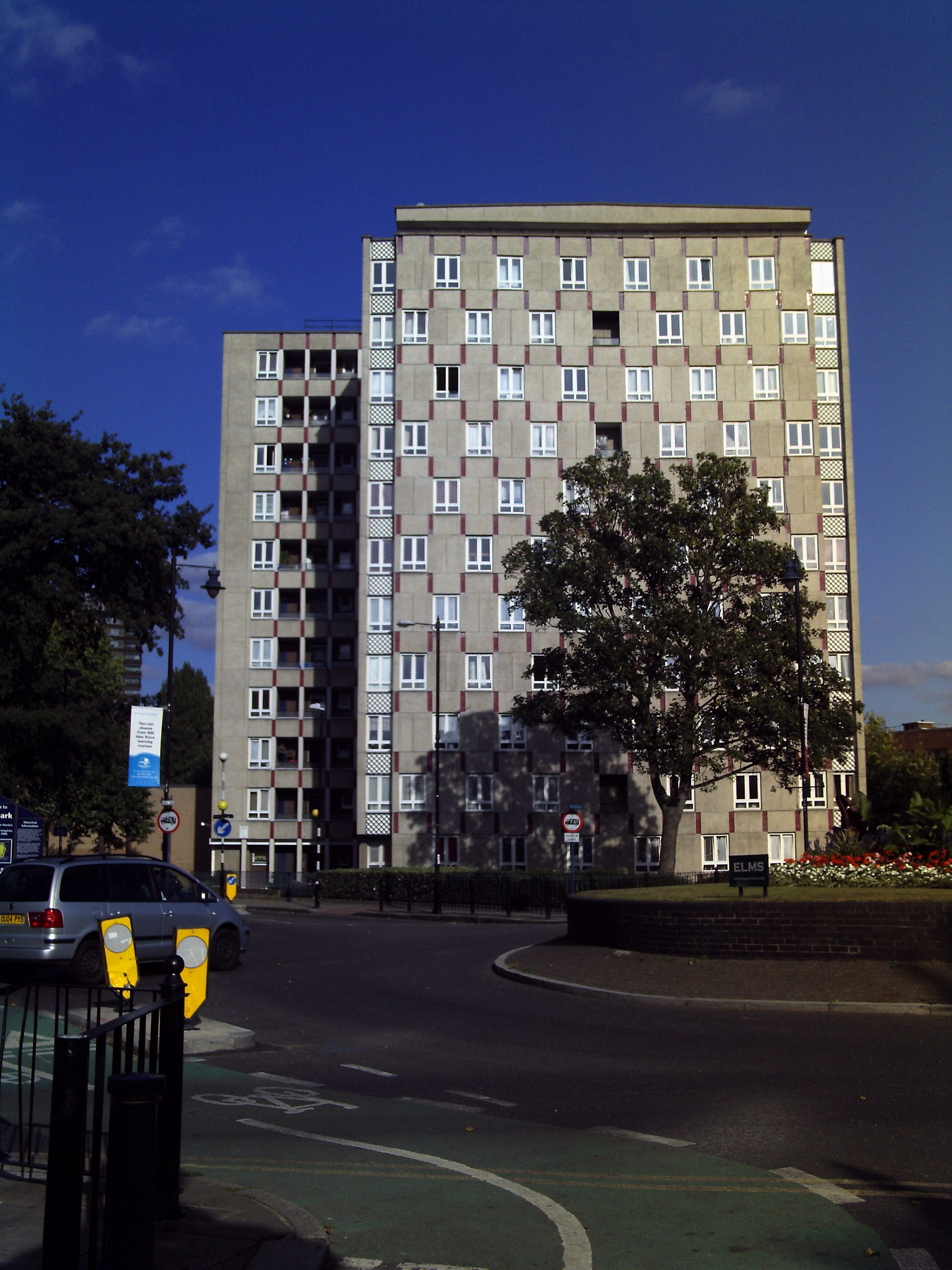
View of Lakeview Estate.

Lakeview Estate is a housing estate in Old Ford, east London, designed by Berthold Lubetkin. It was built on a site damaged by bombing in World War II, on Grove Road between Old Ford Road and the Hertford Union Canal. The estate opened in 1958. It overlooks the lake in Victoria Park.
