= London canal =

The following waterways are known as a London canal:

- Regent's Canal
- The Paddington Arm of the Grand Union Canal

== See also ==
- Hertford Union Canal
- Limehouse Cut
