= Hackney Wicked =

Annual arts festival

Hackney Wicked is an annual arts festival that takes place in Hackney Wick in East London.

The first Hackney Wicked festival took place from 8 to 10 August 2008. It was started by local artists and supported by The Residence Gallery, the Elevator Gallery, the Decima Gallery and The Wallis Gallery

It has been held annually since, with more artists and venues across Hackney Wick supporting the event. The 2019 festival included 90 artists, 55 venues and 75 events. It is now regularly listed in London What's On guides. In 2014, the V&A's Friday Late was a partner with the festival.

The event receives funding from the Arts Council England and since 2015 has been sponsored by the L&Q group. It receives support from artists and venues in Hackney Wick. Key supporters of the event include: the Residence Gallery, the Elevator Gallery, the Decima Gallery, The Wallis Gallery, SEE Studio, Coracle Regatta, Openvizor, Create, CRATE Brewery, Carlton London Exhibition Space, Gavin Turk, the Schwartz Gallery, Stour Space, Forman's Smokehouse Gallery and the Arts Council England.

In 2015 the organisers couldn't fully fund the growing event and instead opted to put money and efforts into smaller events.
