= Hackney Wick =

Neighbourhood in East London, England

Coordinates: 51.541°N 0.027°W

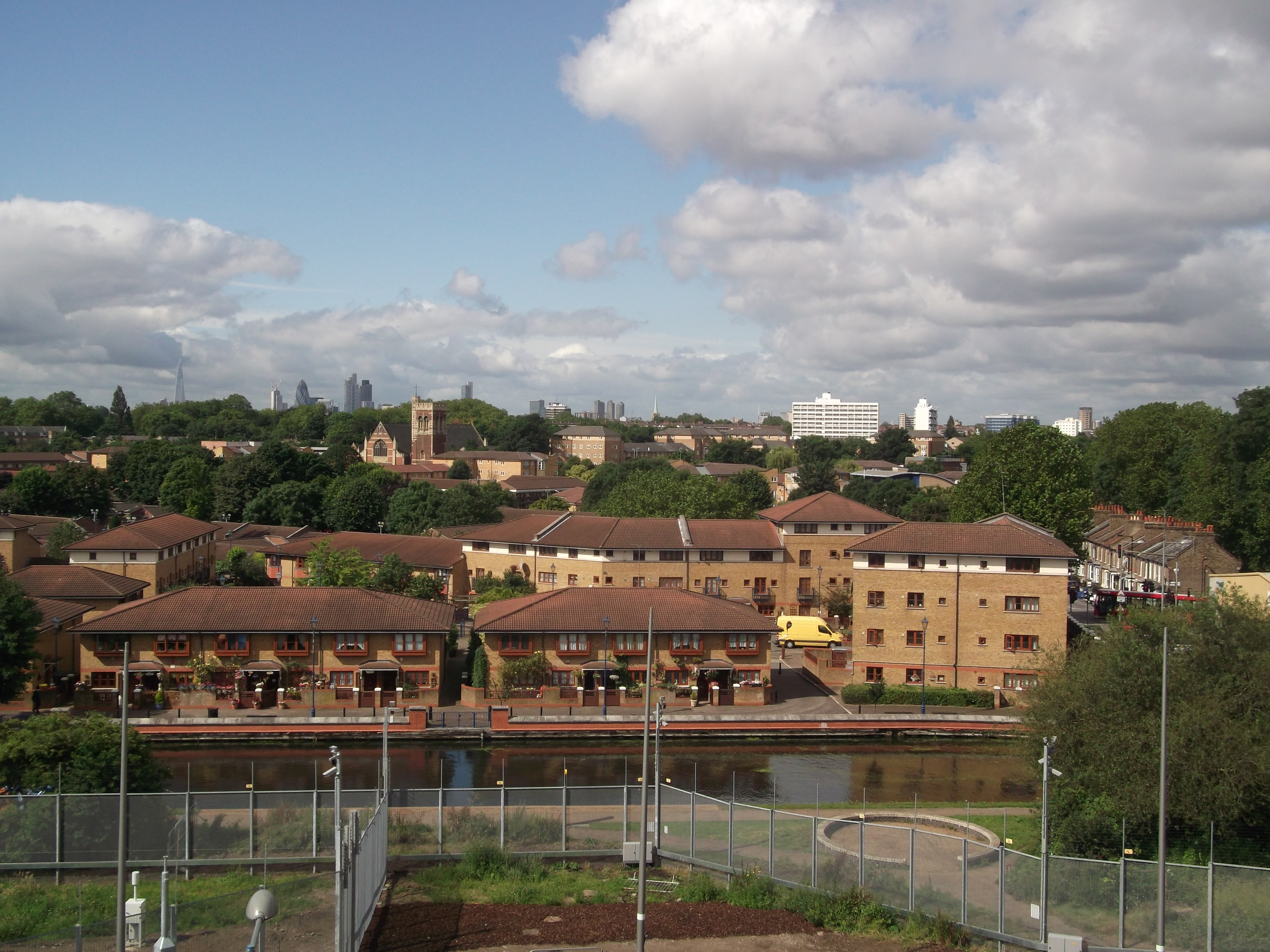
- Housing in Hackney Wick.

- Location within Greater London
- Population: 11,734 (2011 Census)
- OS grid reference: TQ369843
  - Charing Cross: 4.2 mi (6.8 km) SW
- London borough: Hackney; Tower Hamlets
- Ceremonial county: Greater London
- Region: London
- Country: England
- Sovereign state: United Kingdom
- Post town: LONDON
- Postcode district: E9, E3, E15
- Dialling code: 020
- Police: Metropolitan
- Fire: London
- Ambulance: London
- UK Parliament: Hackney South and Shoreditch
- London Assembly: North East; City and East

Hackney Wick is a neighbourhood in East London, England. The area forms the south-eastern part of the district of Hackney, and also of the wider London Borough of Hackney. Adjacent areas of the London Borough of Tower Hamlets, namely Fish Island, are sometimes also described as being part of Hackney Wick. The area lies 4.2 miles (6.8 km) northeast of Charing Cross.

== Geography ==
Hackney Wick is the south-eastern part of the historic district of Hackney, and also of the wider modern London Borough of Hackney. Adjacent parts of Old Ford (including Fish Island) in the London Borough of Tower Hamlets are also sometimes described as Hackney Wick, due to similar post-industrial land uses and their proximity to Hackney Wick railway station. The boundary runs along Wallis Road and the railway.

The core area lies west of the Lee Navigation, here called Hackney Cut, however the parts of the Queen Elizabeth Olympic Park within Hackney have often also been described as Hackney Wick, and the East Wick development within the Olympic Park reflects that.

The A12 and East Cross route form major barriers to the north and west (within Hackney), though the Wick Woodland, an area of secondary woodland, built on former marshland raised up by rubble from the Blitz, lies north of the A12.

== History ==
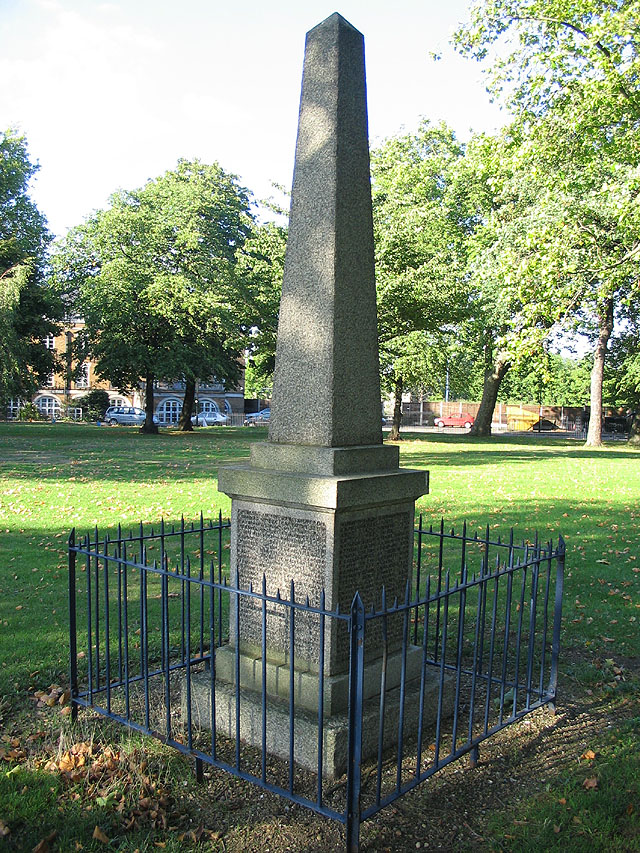
The Hackney Wick First World War memorial in Victoria Park, August 2005

=== Early history ===
The area was part of the Ancient Parish of Hackney, which became the Metropolitan Borough of Hackney in 1900 and merged with neighbouring areas to become the London Borough of Hackney in 1965.

In the Roman period the River Lea was much wider, and the tidal estuary stretched as far as Hackney Wick. In 894, a force of Danes sailed up the river to Hertford; Alfred the Great saw an opportunity to defeat the Danes and dug a new channel to lower the level of the river, leaving the Danes stranded.

Historically, Hackney Wick was an area prone to periodic flooding. The construction of the canals and relief channels on the Lea alleviated that and allowed the development of the area. In historic times, the marshes were used extensively for grazing cattle, and there was limited occupation around the 'great house' at Hackney Wick. This area as well as the marshes were historically part of Lower Homerton (also a part of the parish of Hackney). The former Hackney Brook once flowed through the area, with a confluence with the Lea a short distance to the south in Old Ford.

The area had its roots in the landholding called Wick Manor, in the parish of Hackney, which was farmed from a large building known as Wick House. In 1745 the population was limited to Wick House and a handful of cottages. There was very little urbanisation until the rapid growth of the 1860s and 1870s, which followed the arrival of the railway station.

=== Industrial history ===
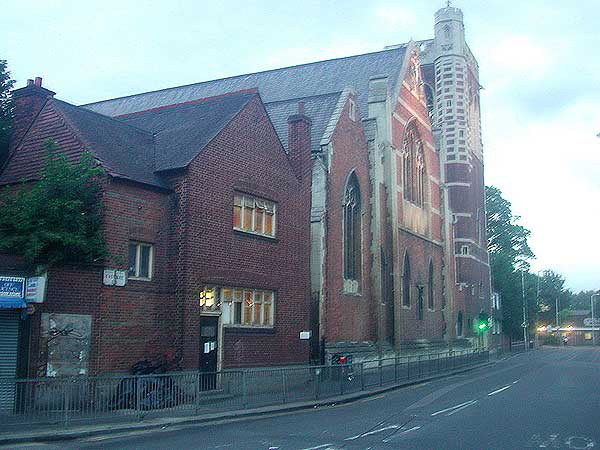
The Eton Mission; until 1880 the parochial building housed rope works.

During the 19th and early 20th centuries, the Wick was a thriving well-populated industrial zone, as the Hackney Wick First World War memorial in Victoria Park testifies (see picture right)—the lower part of the obelisk is densely inscribed on all four faces with the names of Wick men who died in that conflict. When Charles Booth surveyed Hackney Wick in his London-wide survey of poverty during the 1890s he would have noticed that there were, amid the noxious fumes and noise, areas of lessened deprivation. Streets south of the railway such as Wansbeck and Rothbury Roads were a mixture of comfort and poverty. Kelday Road, right on the canal seemed positively middle class. To the north of the railway, streets either side of Wick Road, e.g. Chapman Road, Felstead Street and Percy Terrace were described as "very poor", with "chronic want".

It was no doubt conditions such as these which hastened the involvement of Eton College about this time to instigate their urban mission in Hackney Wick, a philanthropic and perhaps more accurately pedagogical outreach shared with several other public schools. The Eton Mission lasted from 1880 to 1971 when the college decided that a more local social project was appropriate for changed times, and has left as legacy a fine church by G. F. Bodley, a noted rowing club, and the 59 Club.

In the last quarter of the eighteenth century, water mills on the Hackney Brook were adapted for the manufacturer of silk, and in particular crêpe. In 1811, it was said that "the works at these mills are moved by two steam engines, on an improved principle, which set in motion 30,000 spindles, besides numerous other implements of machinery used in the manufacture."

The world's first true synthetic plastic, parkesine, invented by Alexander Parkes, was manufactured here from 1866 to 1868, though Parkes' company failed due to high production costs. In contrast shellac, a natural polymer was manufactured at the Lea Works by A.F. Suter and Co. at the Victory Works for many years. The factory at nos 83/4 Eastway commenced operation in 1927. Subsequently, they relocated to Dace Road in Bow. For many years Hackney Wick was the location of the oil distiller Carless, Capel & Leonard, credited with introduction of the term petrol in the 1890s. The distinguished chemist and academic Sir Frederick Warner (1910–2010) worked at Carless's Hackney Wick factory from 1948 to 1956. William J Leonard (1857–1923) was followed by his son Julian Mayard Leonard (1900–1978) into the firm, where he became managing director and deputy chairman.

The firm of Brooke Simpson Spiller at Atlas Works in Berkshire Road had taken over the firm of William Henry Perkin at Greenford Green near Harrow in 1874, but subsequently disposed of some operations to Burt Bolton Heywood in Silvertown. Nevertheless, Brooke Simpson Spiller is the successor company to the founding father of the British Dyestuff Industry. The company employed the brilliant organic chemist Arthur George Green (1864–1941) from 1885 until 1894, when he left to join the Clayton Aniline Company in Manchester and ultimately, when the British chemical industry failed his talents, to the chair of Colour Chemistry at Leeds University. At Hackney Wick, Green discovered the important dyestuff intermediate Primuline. He was a contemporary of the organic chemist Richard John Friswell (1849–1908) who was from 1874 a research chemist, and from 1886 until 1899 director and chemical manager. Perhaps even more distinguished was the Jewish chemist Professor Raphael Meldola FRS, who is remembered for Meldola's Blue dye and is commemorated by the Royal Society of Chemistry's Meldola Medal. He worked at Hackney Wick from 1877 until 1885, where Meldola's Blue was discovered. Friswell went on to succeed H. E. Armstrong as Professor of Chemistry at Finsbury Technical College. Friswell eventually left Hackney Wick to work for the British Uralite Company at Higham although he was still a director there in 1893 when he wrote to Armstrong to describe bad trading conditions at Atlas Works. A large collection of Hackney made dyestuffs is on view at the Powerhouse Museum in Sydney Australia. The firm of W. C. Barnes of the Phoenix Works was also engaged in the aniline dye industry at Hackney Wick.

The confectioner Clarnico is synonymous with Hackney Wick. The company, known as Clarke, Nickolls, Coombs until 1946, arrived in Hackney Wick in 1879. Despite being taken over by Trebor Bassett, the name lives on in Bassett's Clarnico Mint Creams and also in the CNC Property company. Just after the second world war, Clarnico was the largest confectioner in Britain but moved further across the Lea to Waterden Road in 1955 where it survived for another 20 years. The company had its own brass band in the early 20th century.

Another pathfinding entrepreneur in Hackney Wick was the Frenchman Eugene Serre. His father, Achille Serre, who had settled in Stoke Newington, introduced dry cleaning to England. Eugene expanded the business into a former tar factory in White Post Lane which still carries traces of the firm's name.

=== Post industrial history ===
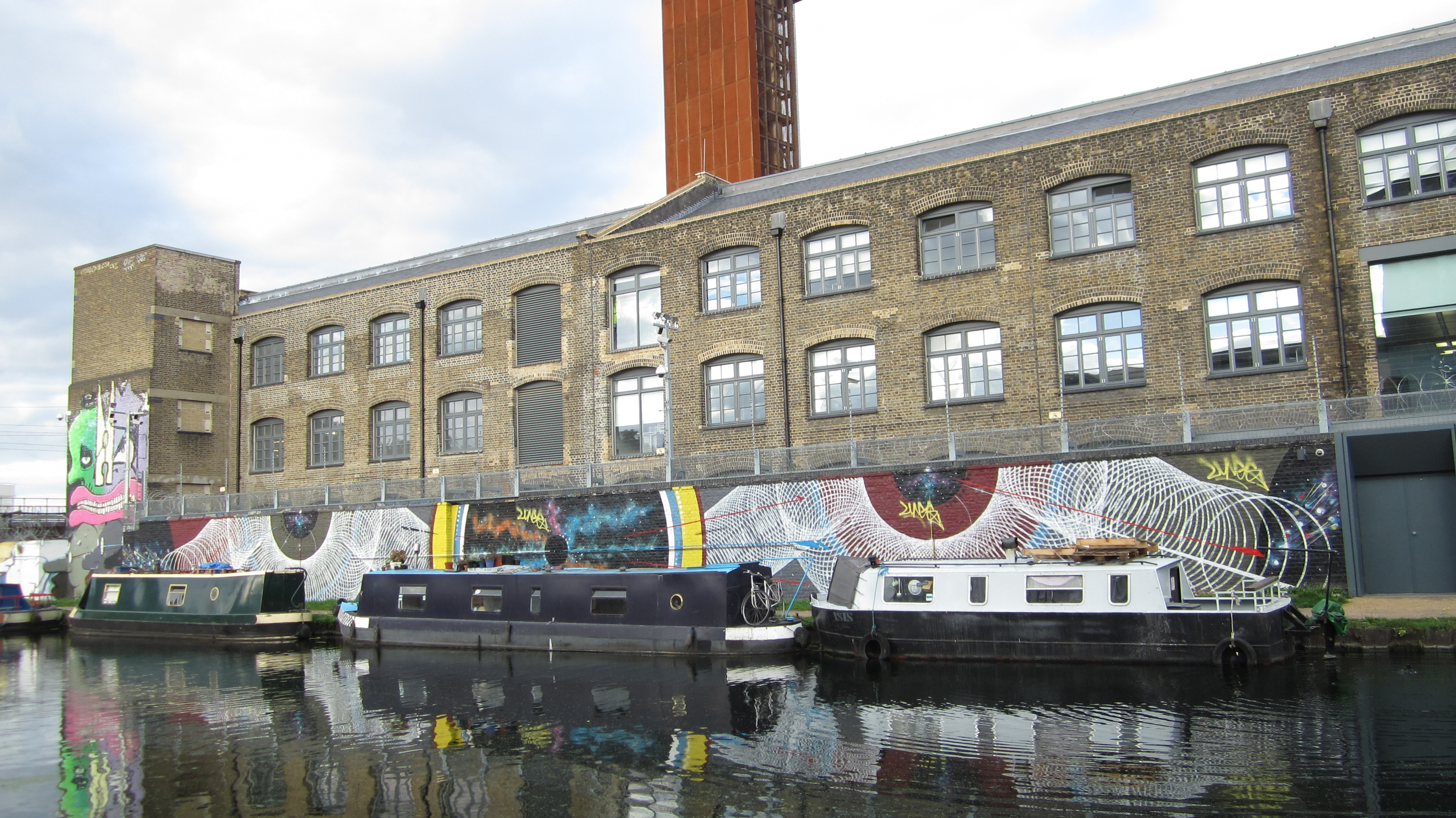
River Lee Navigation, off White Post Lane

In post-industrial times, Hackney Wick has seen many changes to its topography. Very little remains of the inter-war street pattern between the Hertford Union Canal and Eastway (the western part was then known as Gainsborough Road) or the masses of small terraced houses. Many of the street names have permanently vanished due to later redevelopment. Part of the Wick was redeveloped in the 1960s to create the Greater London Council's Trowbridge Estate, which consisted of single-storey modern housing at the foot of seven 21-storey tower blocks. The estate's housing conditions deteriorated quickly and despite an attempt to regenerate the tower blocks, much of the housing in the estate was replaced between 1985 and 1996. The artist Rachel Whiteread made screenprints of photographs of the former Trowbridge estate which are in the Tate Collection as part of her series Demolished.

The Atlas Works of 1863, backing onto the Lee Navigation, was demolished to make way for housing in the 1990s. In the 1930s it had been the home of the British Perforated Paper Co, famous for inventing toilet paper in 1880.

== Development ==
Due to its proximity to the Olympic Park, Hackney Wick received community and public realm development grants. The Draft Phase 1 Hackney Wick Area Action Plan was developed for consultation in November 2009 by Hackney Council as a strategy to guide and manage future change in the area. The updated Area Action Plan was adopted in 2012. This should further contribute to improvements in the area, although there are fears that development may price many residents, particularly artists, out of the area.

Conversely, concerns have been raised over some of the local effects of the Olympic Park development, including the potential impact to the future of the century-old Manor Garden Allotments, which has inspired a vocal community campaign.

== Demography ==
Hackney Wick compared
2011 UK Census	Hackney Wick	Hackney	London	England
Total population	11,734	246,270	8,173,941	53,012,456
White	48.4%	54.7%	59.8%	85.4%
Black	31.8%	23.1%	13.3%	3.5%
Mixed	11.1%	6.4%	5.0%	2.3%
Asian	8.7%	10.5%	18.5%	7.8%
Other	4.4%	5.3%	3.4%	1.0%

At the time of the 2011 UK census, the Wick ward covered Hackney Wick and nearby areas. The census showed the ward had a total population of 11,734, with an area of 163.26 hectares and a density of 71.9 persons per hectare. Of the 4,802 households in Hackney Wick, 17.0% were married or same-sex civil partnership couples living together, 36.5% were one-person households, 8.6% were co-habiting couples and 19.4% were lone parents.

In 2011 the largest ethnic group is White (48.4%), followed by Black or Black British (31.8%), Mixed (11.1%) and Asian or British Asian (8.7%). The remaining 4.4 per cent is made up of other unspecified ethnic groups. As for religion, in 2011 50.4% of residents identified as Christian, 12.7% as Muslim, 1.5% as Buddhist, 1.0% as Jewish, 0.5% as Sikh, 0.4% as Hindu, 0.4% having an unspecified religion, 8.1% not stating their religion, and 25.1% having no religion.

== Culture ==
Hackney Wick has a long been home to a large number of professional creatives, artists and musicians. Attracted in part by the low cost studio spaces that became available with the decline of its industrial past, more than 600 individual artist studios existed in 2013. With notable artists including Banksy, Paul Noble and Fantich and Young

The area has also a number of established creative arts venues with the Schwartz Gallery, Stour Space, The Yard micro theatre, and the artists collectives such as the Performance Space, and the White Building, London's centre for art, technology and sustainability which was developed in partnership with the London Legacy Development Corporation and is occupied by Space studios.

Following the Olympic Games in 2012, Hackney Wick has seen the onset of rapid gentrification in part due to the opening of new residential locations within the Olympic legacy site but also specifically the artist culture which has been long established in recent history.

=== Contemporary culture ===
Further along the Eastway, the 2012 Olympic site claimed industrial premises formerly used by British Industrial Gases (later BOC) to manufacture oxygen and acetylene and Setright Registers Limited who, between the mid-1950s and mid-1960s, made the famous bus ticket issuing Setright Machine used throughout the UK and abroad.

The historic Hackney Wick Stadium, well known throughout the East End for greyhound racing and speedway, became derelict in the late 1990s and closed in 2003. However, it became the site for the 2012 Olympic media and broadcast centre and, after the Games, was to be turned over for commercial use.

There are many other signs of revival. Not only will the area benefit from the 2012 Olympics development, but London's artistic community, increasingly forced out of the old warehousing and industrial zones to the south of Hackney borough and in Tower Hamlets by rising rents, are taking an interest in the more affordable industrial buildings out at the Wick. Though rents rose through 2011 and 2012 because of the upcoming Olympics. Hackney Wick's first arts festival, Hackney Wicked, took place from 8 to 10 August 2008. The festival weekend included show openings from a series of the Wick's local art venues, including Mother Studios, Elevator Gallery, The Residence, Decima Gallery, Schwartz Gallery, Show Dome, Mainyard Gallery, Top and Tail Gallery, The Peanut Factory and Wallis Studios. 2009 saw the staging of a second 'Hackney Wicked' arts festival, which took place from Friday 29 July to Sunday 1 August. The Festival had the 4th edition in 2011, taking place between 29 July and 31 July where you can watch a film of its true spirit. In September 2012, Hackney Film Festival curated an outdoor canal-side screening of Andrew Kötting and Iain Sinclair's olympic sized travelogue 'Swandown', with a Q&A session at Carlton London Exhibition Space, during the closing ceremony of the Paralympics. The evening was hosted by Gareth Evans in association with the Mayor of London.

The notable 59 Club for motorcyclists was founded at the Eton Mission church in 1959 in Hackney Wick.

=== In popular culture ===
Hackney Wick is mentioned in an exchange of dialogue in The Ribos Operation, a 1978 episode of Doctor Who, as being a "mudpatch in the middle of nowhere" that one of the characters longs to return to.

A song titled "Hackney Wick" is featured on singer Rose Gray's debut studio album Louder, Please, released on 17 January 2025.

Hackney Wick is mentioned in the song "Danceteria Afterhours" by the American singer Madonna and British singer Charli XCX released on September 24, 2026. They performed the remix of the single "Danceteria" from Madonnas album Confessions II live at the 2026 MTV Video Music Awards.

== Transport ==
=== Rail ===
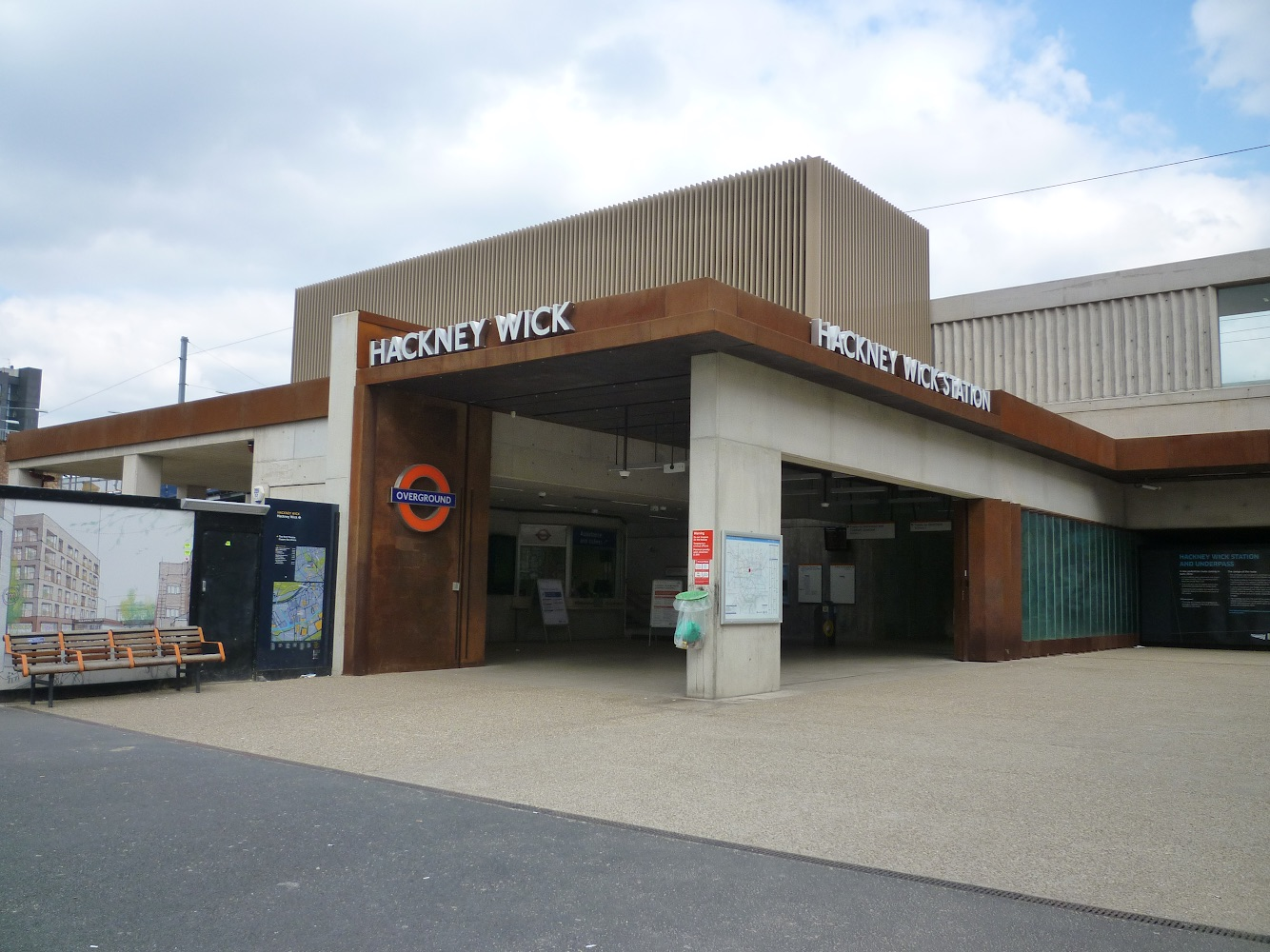
Entrance to Hackney Wick railway station

Hackney Wick railway station is served by London Overground services on the Mildmay Line. The station is near the scene of the first railway murder. The victim, Thomas Briggs of 5 Clapton Square, was returning from dining with his niece in Peckham in July 1864 and was murdered on the train.

Victoria Park railway station was on the North London Railway to Poplar, which closed to passengers in 1943 and to goods in the early 1980s. It was on the site of the present East Cross Route and opened in 1866 at the former junction of the Stratford and Poplar lines, replacing a short-lived station of 1856 on the north side of Wick Lane (now Wick Road). No trace of either remains. The redundant viaduct carrying the former goods line to the Millwall docks over the East Cross Route was removed in the 1990s. The present Hackney Wick railway station was built on the 1854 spur from the original North London Line to Stratford. The entrance poles to the former Hackney Wick Goods and Coal Depot (a site now occupied by housing) are still to be seen beside the Kenworthy Road bridge.

=== Buses ===
The local area is well served by seven daytime bus routes and one nighttime route, with three of the routes terminating at Hackney Wick. With the area having access to London bus routes 26, 30, 236, 276, 339, 388, 488 and N26, Hackney Wick has connections to areas of Central London and other areas such as Stratford.

=== Roads ===
Hackney Wick is connected to the National Road Network, with the A12 Eastway (completed late 1990s), and East Cross Route linking the area with the Blackwall Tunnel (1960s).

=== Walking and cycling and waterways ===
Hackney Wick is on the Capital Ring walking route, much of which is accessible to cyclists. The River Lee Navigation, and other local canals, have a tow path which is accessible for both walking and cycling. The Hertford Union Canal is accessed via a ramp from Wick Road, near St Marks Gate. From here, eastward, the Lea Valley Walk provides a continuous route to Hertfordshire for the particularly determined, the National Cycle Route 1 also runs on both towpaths connecting Hackney Wick to the National Cycle Network. Westwards, the towpath proceeds to the Hertford Union junction with the Regent's Canal; to the south this proceeds to Limehouse Basin, and to the north-west provides a route through north London to Islington, Camden and Paddington.

== See also ==
- Lower Lea Valley
