= Elevator Gallery =

Art gallery in London, England

Coordinates: 51°30′49.1″N 00°00′31.7″W

Elevator Gallery is a contemporary art venue in Balfron Tower. The gallery first opened in 2007 in Hackney Wick, London, and has since been on location at various venues around London. Besides regular exhibitions of contemporary art, the gallery has a varied programme of live art, cinema and musical events.

The gallery opened on 20 October 2007, with its opening show 'Magical Thinking'. Since then it has mainly been curated by artists Simon Reuben White and Snoozie Hexagon. Subsequent exhibitions have been 'Interface', 'Dead Bodies and Cardboard', 'Relocating Absence' (co-curated with Elisa Tosoni) and 'The Tomorrow People', and 'In Its Wake' (guest curated by Lisa Peachy). Elevator Gallery was one of the galleries that participated in the Hackney Wicked arts festivals 2008 and 2009.

Elevator is also known for its performance, film and club nights such as its regular 'Zero de Conduite' events. One of the most successful of these events was its 'Happy Birthday Elevator' night, which took place on the evening of 20 October 2008, to mark the gallery's first anniversary.

Elevator has been a featured gallery on the artreview.com website.
