= Hertford Union Canal =

Canal in the London Borough of Tower Hamlets

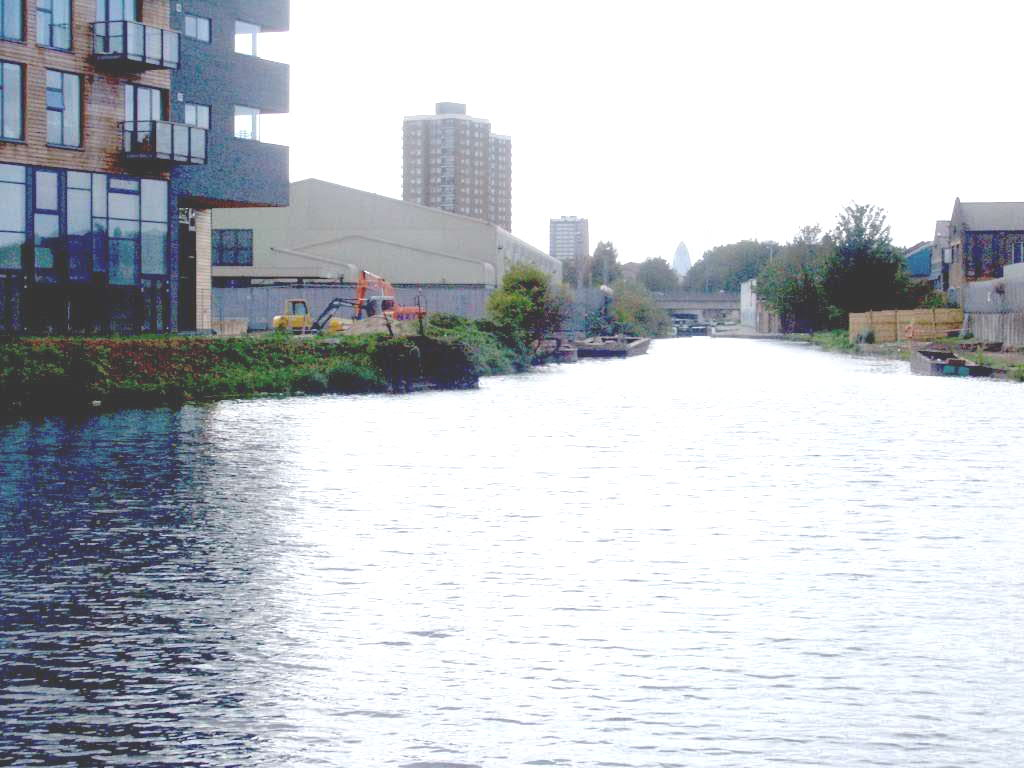
- Junction of Hertford Union Canal and River Lee Navigation

Specifications
- Maximum boat length: 72 ft 0 in (21.95 m)
- Maximum boat beam: 14 ft 0 in (4.27 m)
- Locks: 3
- Status: Navigable
- Navigation authority: Canal and River Trust

History
- Original owner: Sir George Duckett
- Principal engineer: Francis Giles
- Date of act: 1824
- Date completed: 1830

Geography
- Start point: Regent's Canal
- End point: Lee Navigation

The Hertford Union Canal or Duckett's Cut, just over 1 mile (1.6 km) long, connects the Regent's Canal to the Lee Navigation in the London Borough of Tower Hamlets in East London. It was opened in 1830 but quickly proved to be a commercial failure. It was acquired by the Regents Canal Company in 1857, and became part of the Grand Union Canal in 1927.

== History ==
Like its 1766 predecessor, the Limehouse Cut, the Hertford Union Canal was intended to provide a short-cut between the River Thames and the River Lee Navigation. It allowed traffic on the Lea heading for the Thames to bypass the tidal, tortuous and often silted Bow Back Rivers of the Lea via a short stretch of the Regent's Canal, and provided a short-cut from the Lea to places west along the Regent's Canal.

Hertford Union Canal Act 1824
- Act of Parliament
- Parliament of the United Kingdom
- Long title: An Act for making and maintaining a Navigable Canal from the River Lee Navigation in the Parish of Saint Mary Stratford Bow in the County of Middlesex, to join the Regents Canal at or near a Place called Old Ford Lock in the Parish of Saint Matthew Bethnal Green in the said County of Middlesex.
- Citation: 5 Geo. 4. c. xlvii

Dates
- Royal assent: 17 May 1824

The canal was promoted by Sir George Duckett who succeeded in obtaining an act of Parliament, the Hertford Union Canal Act 1824 (5 Geo. 4. c. xlvii), that gained its royal assent on 17 May 1824. The act was entitled An Act for making and maintaining a navigable Canal from the River Lee Navigation, in the parish of St. Mary Stratford Bow, in the county of Middlesex, to join the Regent's Canal at or near a Place called Old Ford Lock, in the parish of St. Matthew Bethnal Green, in the said county of Middlesex. The Act authorised Duckett to borrow up to £50,000 to fund construction, and to charge tolls for using the canal, initially one shilling (£0.05) per ton of goods carried.

Regent's and Hertford Union Canals Act 1855
- Act of Parliament
- Parliament of the United Kingdom
- Long title: An Act to authorize the Company of Proprietors of the Regent's Canal to purchase the Hertford Union Canal; and for other Purposes.
- Citation: 18 & 19 Vict. c. xcv

Dates
- Royal assent: 26 June 1855

Text of statute as originally enacted

With Francis Giles appointed as engineer, the canal opened in 1830 and was for some years known as Duckett's Canal or Duckett's cut (or passage). It was not a commercial success, and within a year offers to waive the tolls were being made. For several years around the 1850s it was unnavigable, as a dam was built across it to prevent the Regent's Canal losing water to it. After failed attempts to sell it in 1851, it was eventually acquired by the Regent's Canal Company by the Regent's and Hertford Union Canals Act 1855 (18 & 19 Vict. c. xcv) and became a branch of that canal on 28 October 1857. The new owners removed the dam, and deepened and widened the channel. When the Grand Union Canal Company came into existence on 1 January 1929, it became part of that network. Today, it is maintained by the Canal & River Trust.

== Route ==
The canal starts at Hertford Union Junction between Mile End Lock and Old Ford Lock on the Regent's Canal in Bethnal Green. It passes along the north of Bow Wharf, redeveloped in the 1990s with shops and bars, and after Grove Road, passes south of Lakeview Estate, completed in 1958. For much of the rest of its route it is bounded on the north by Victoria Park. The canal joins the Lee Navigation just above Old Ford Lock.

Many of the associated locks, bridges and other features around the canal date from the canal's opening in 1830, and are designated listed structures within a scheduled monument.

== Locks ==
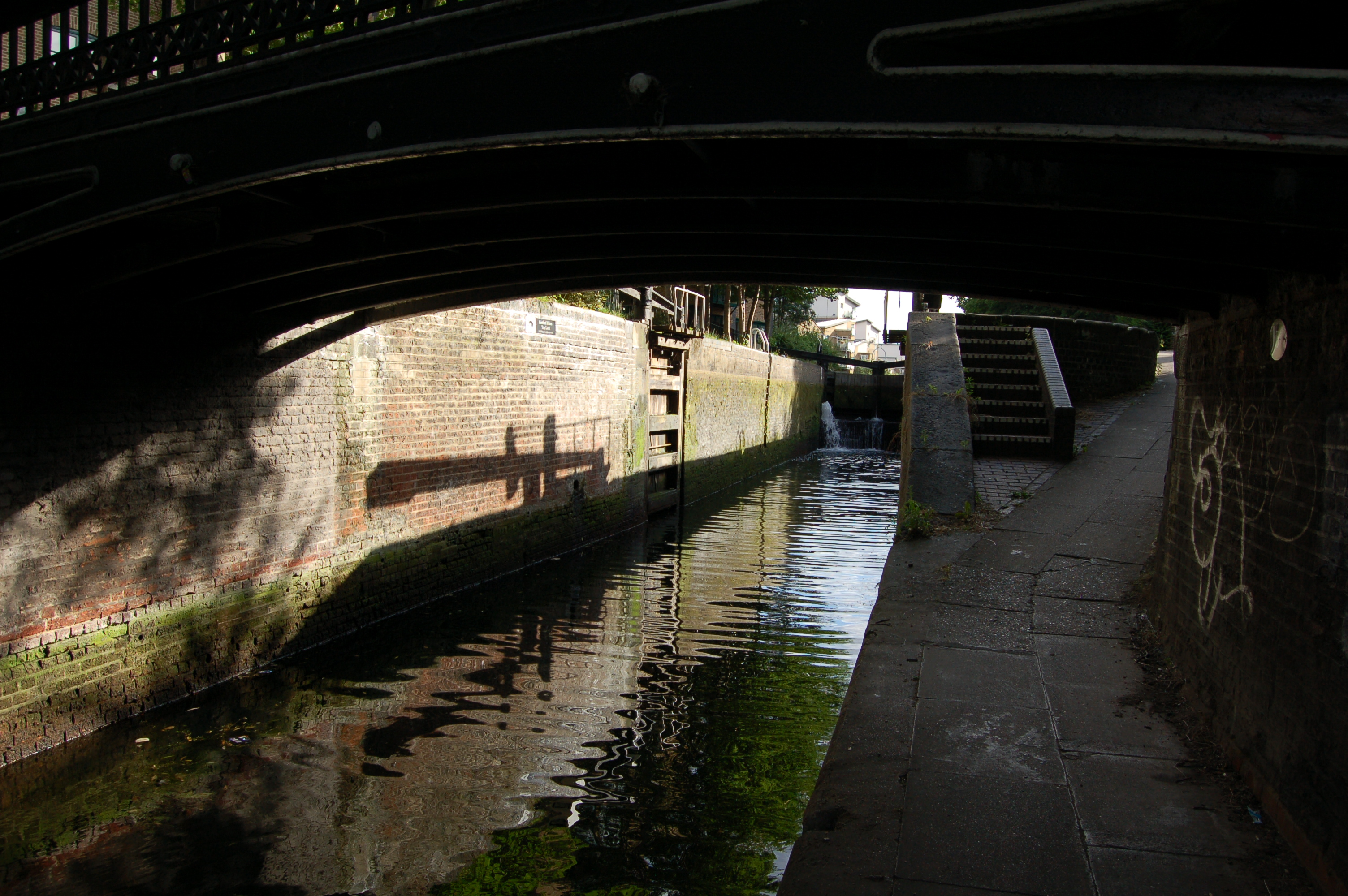
Hertford Union Top Lock No. 1

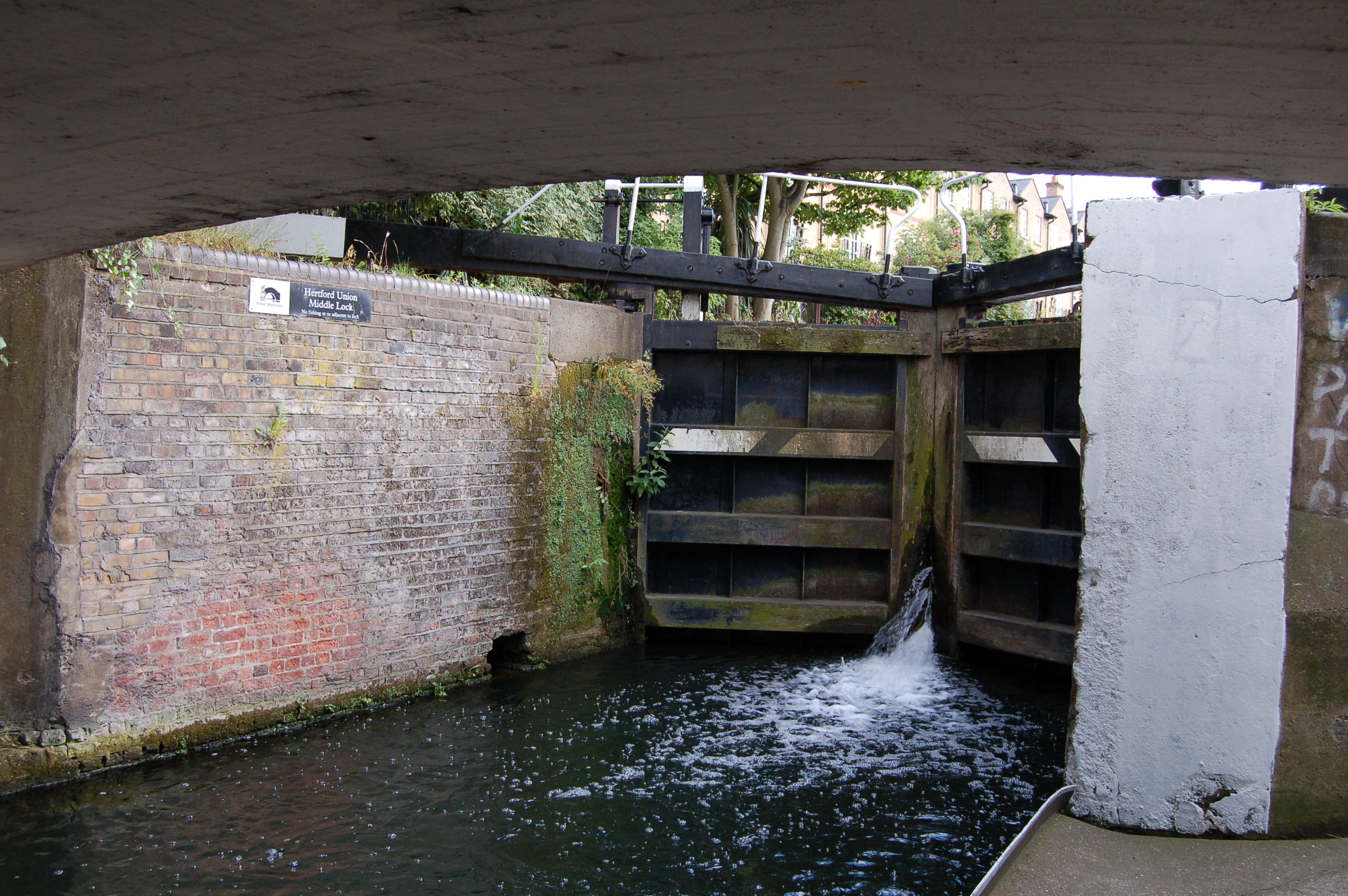
Hertford Union Middle Lock No. 2

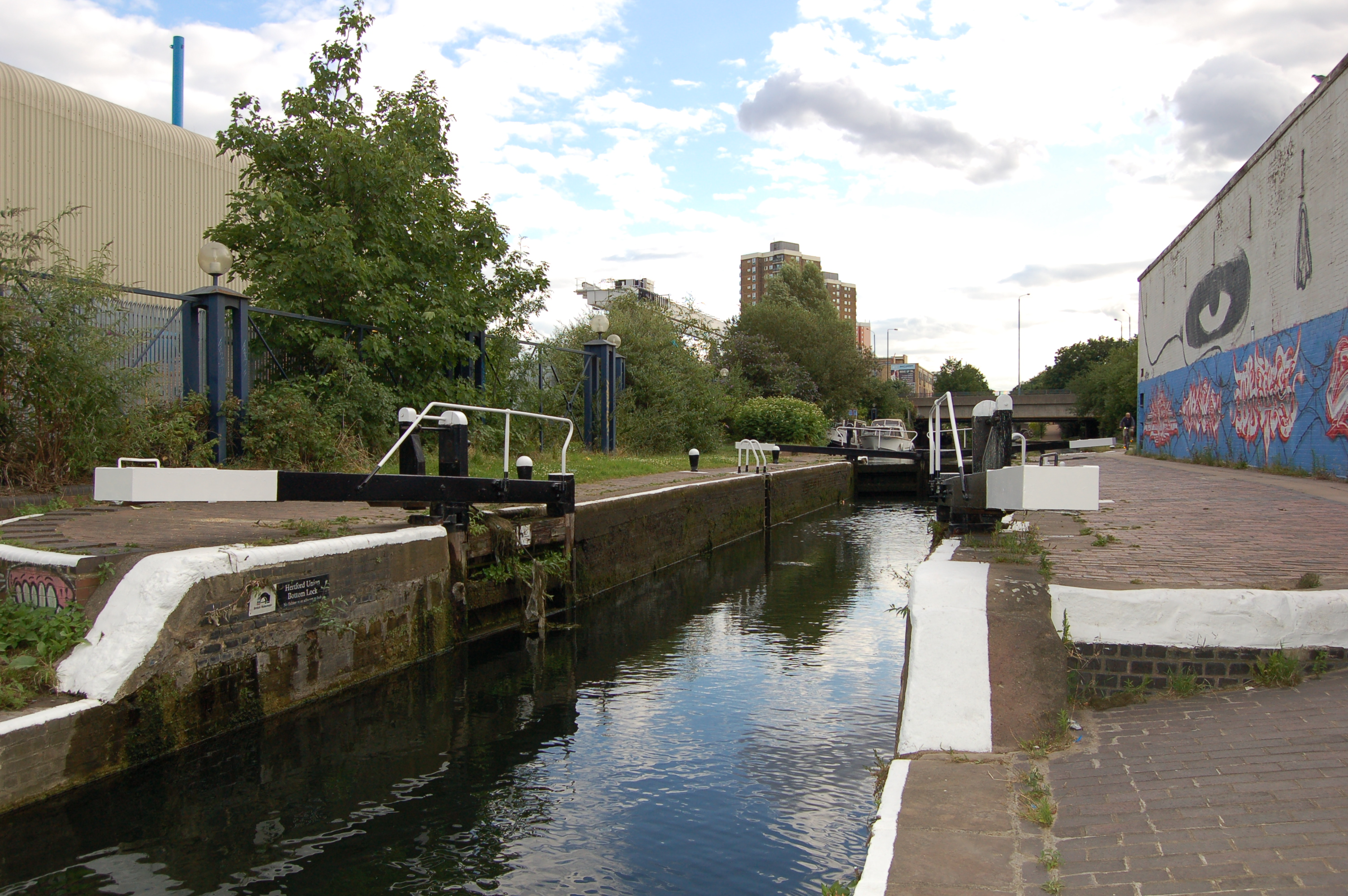
Hertford Union Bottom Lock No. 3

The locks on this canal have been collectively named Old Ford Three Locks, all lying within the district of Old Ford, but are now individually known as Hertford Union Top, Middle and Bottom locks. They are grouped together towards the north-eastern end, and descend approximately 19 feet (5.8 m) from the Regent's Canal to the Lee Navigation. They are all single manual locks, and the largest craft that can use them have a length of 72 feet and a beam of 14 feet.

Proceeding west to east, the locks are:

=== Hertford Union Top Lock No. 1 ===
This is lock No.1, and is 0.63 miles (1.0 km) from the Hertford Union Junction with the Regent's Canal. It is to the south of Victoria Park, with the tail of the lock passing beneath a cast iron footbridge accessing the park from Parnell Road. It has a fall of 6 feet 3 inches (1.9 m).

The lock was designated a Grade II listed structure in 1990, and its bottom gates have rare cast iron balance beams. One of the adjacent cottages (No 3 Lock Cottages) is also a Grade II listed building.
51°32′17″N 0°01′47″W

=== Hertford Union Middle Lock No. 2 ===
The middle lock has a fall of 8 feet 11 inches (2.7 m) The tail of the lock passes under Cadogan Terrace.
51°32′21″N 0°01′39″W

=== Hertford Union Bottom Lock No. 3 ===
The lower lock has a fall of 3 feet 9 inches (1.1 m). It is just 0.13 miles (0.2 km) from the junction with the River Lee.

A now demolished public house, The Mitford Castle, by the ramp to the canal, on Wick Road, was where Thomas Briggs – the first victim of a railway murder – was taken to die from his wounds, in July 1864 (see Hackney Wick).
51°32′26″N 0°01′29″W

== Transport ==
The nearest London Overground stations are Cambridge Heath at the western end or Hackney Wick at the eastern end.

The canal towpath is open to walkers and cyclists, without permit. At its eastern end, the towpath joins the Lea Valley Walk. At Hackney Wick, the Capital Ring crosses the canal; with section 13 proceeding north-west toward Stoke Newington and section 14, south-east via The Greenway towards Beckton District Park. The towpath forms part of the "Limehouse Circuit" commencing at Limehouse Basin and utilising the Limehouse Cut, Lee Navigation, Regent's Canal and Hertford Union in a circular five-mile walk.

The Olympic Park was constructed to the east of the Lee Navigation. During the games, the Cut was closed to navigation and used for mooring visiting craft. In the legacy phase of the 2012 Summer Olympics, there is promised access to the Olympic Park and Bow Back Rivers.

== See also ==
- Canals of the United Kingdom
- History of the British canal system
