= A1205 road =

Road in east London, England

Coordinates: 51.538°N 0.043°W

A1205

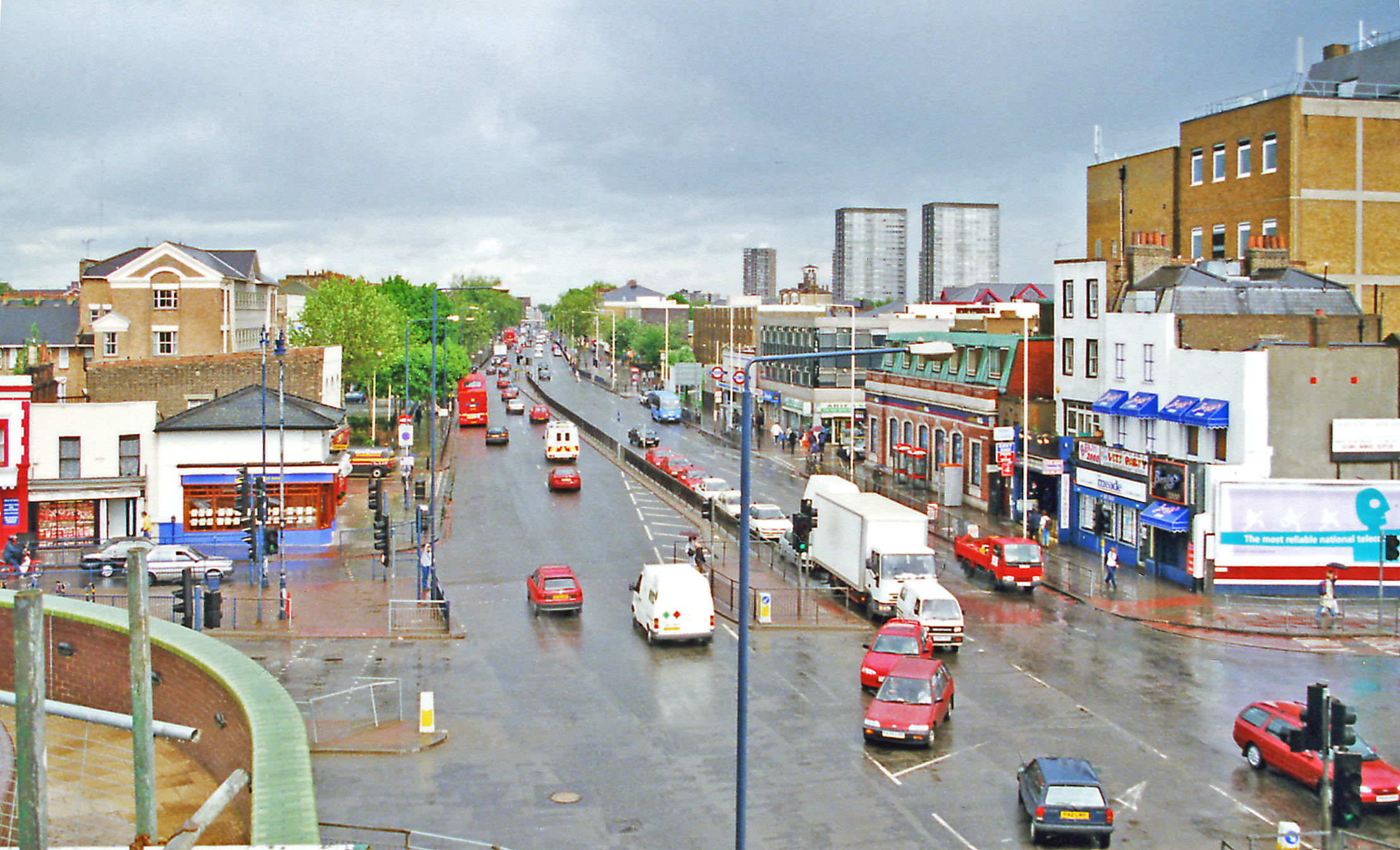
- Mile End Road in 2000 - panorama eastward from the Green Footbridge along the A11 Mile End Road, at junction of A1205 Grove Road (left) - Burdett Road (right). On the right is the entrance to Mile End station (London Underground, District and Central Lines)

Route information
- Length: 2.0 mi (3.2 km)

Major junctions
- North end: Hackney
- A106; A11; A13; A1261
- South end: Limehouse

Location
- Country: United Kingdom
- Primary destinations: Victoria Park

Road network
- Roads in the United Kingdom; Motorways; A and B road zones
← A1203	→ A1206

The A1205 is a road in east London which runs north to south parallel to the Regent's Canal and connects South Hackney and Victoria Park with the A13 at Limehouse. It is approximately 2 miles (3 km) in length, and runs in a roughly SSW direction.

== Route ==
=== Lauriston Road ===
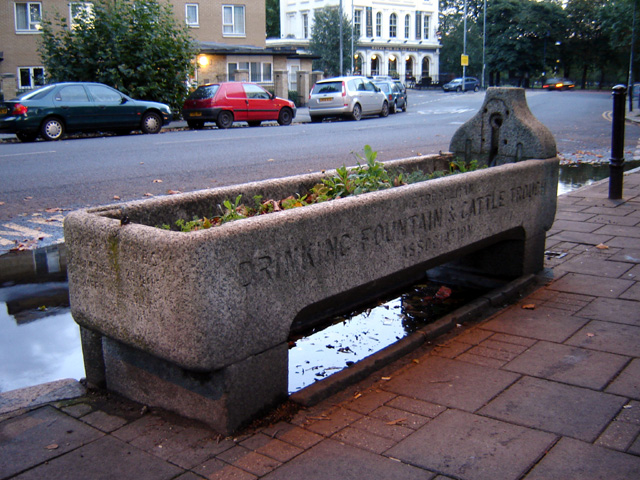
Cattle trough on Lauriston Road, South Hackney. Victoria Park is in the right background to the south, where the road becomes Grove Road.

The road starts at a roundabout junction with Victoria Park Road in South Hackney in the London Borough of Hackney, and for the short distance it is in that borough it is called Lauriston Road.

=== Grove Road ===
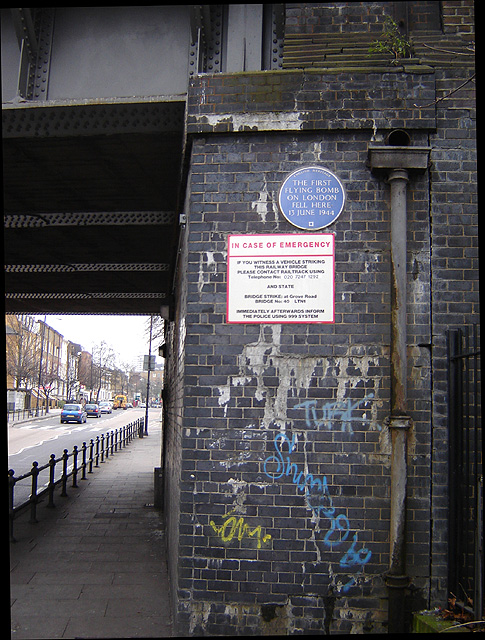
The railway bridge on Grove Road, showing the blue plaque commemorating the first V-1 to strike London on 13 June 1944. (January 2006)

The road then enters the London Borough of Tower Hamlets and forms a divide between the two halves of Victoria Park, until a roundabout junction with Old Ford Road (the B118) in Bethnal Green. By the roundabout is the Lakeview Estate, designed by Berthold Lubetkin. From there until it crosses Mile End Road, the A1205 is called Grove Road and for much of the distance after crossing Roman Road it forms the eastern boundary of Mile End Park.

Where the road passes under the Great Eastern Main Line, there is a plaque indicating the spot where, on 13 June 1944, during the Second World War, the first V-1 flying bomb to hit London fell, killing six, injuring 30, and making 200 people homeless. The area remained derelict for many years until it was cleared to extend Mile End Park. Before demolition, local artist Rachel Whiteread made a cast of the inside of 193 Grove Road. Despite attracting controversy, the exhibit won her the Turner Prize for 1993.

=== Burdett Road ===
==== History ====
Built in 1858, it was at first called Victoria Park Approach Road because it enabled access from the docks to Victoria Park. On 19 December 1862 it was renamed Burdett Road after philanthropist Angela Burdett-Coutts. The Limehouse Board of Works objected to the change of name, saying it was unpatriotic, "ridiculous" and would lower house prices; but the name was retained, it being popular in the Mile End area. Burdett Road was the site of Burdett Road railway station, closed in 1941.

==== Today ====
Burdett Road is part of the North and East London red route system.

After crossing the junction with Bow Road and Mile End Road the remaining distance is called Burdett Road. It forms the western boundary of the Lansbury Estate and ceases to form the boundary of Mile End Park after passing Mile End Stadium and passing under the London, Tilbury and Southend line. Here a crossroads is formed with St Pauls Way (B140). The road then passes over Limehouse Cut before terminating at a junction with the A13 and the West India Dock Road.

== Culture ==
It is referenced in the song "Mile End" by Pulp, featured in the 1996 film Trainspotting.

== Public transport ==
=== Buses ===
The 277 bus serves the entire length of the road with other routes serving some sections: 425 till Mile End bus stop, D6 from the south of Burdett Road to Roman Road, D7 from the south of Burdett Road to Mile End bus stop (north of Mile End Road), 323 from Bow Common Lane to Mile End bus stop and the 339 from Roman Road to Mile End (turning east onto Mile End Road).

The 309 crosses it in the south (at St. Paul's Way/Ben Jonson Road), and the 25, 205 and N205 at Mile End Road.
