= Victoria Park, Tower Hamlets =

Urban park in East London, United Kingdom

Coordinates: 51.537°N 0.038°W

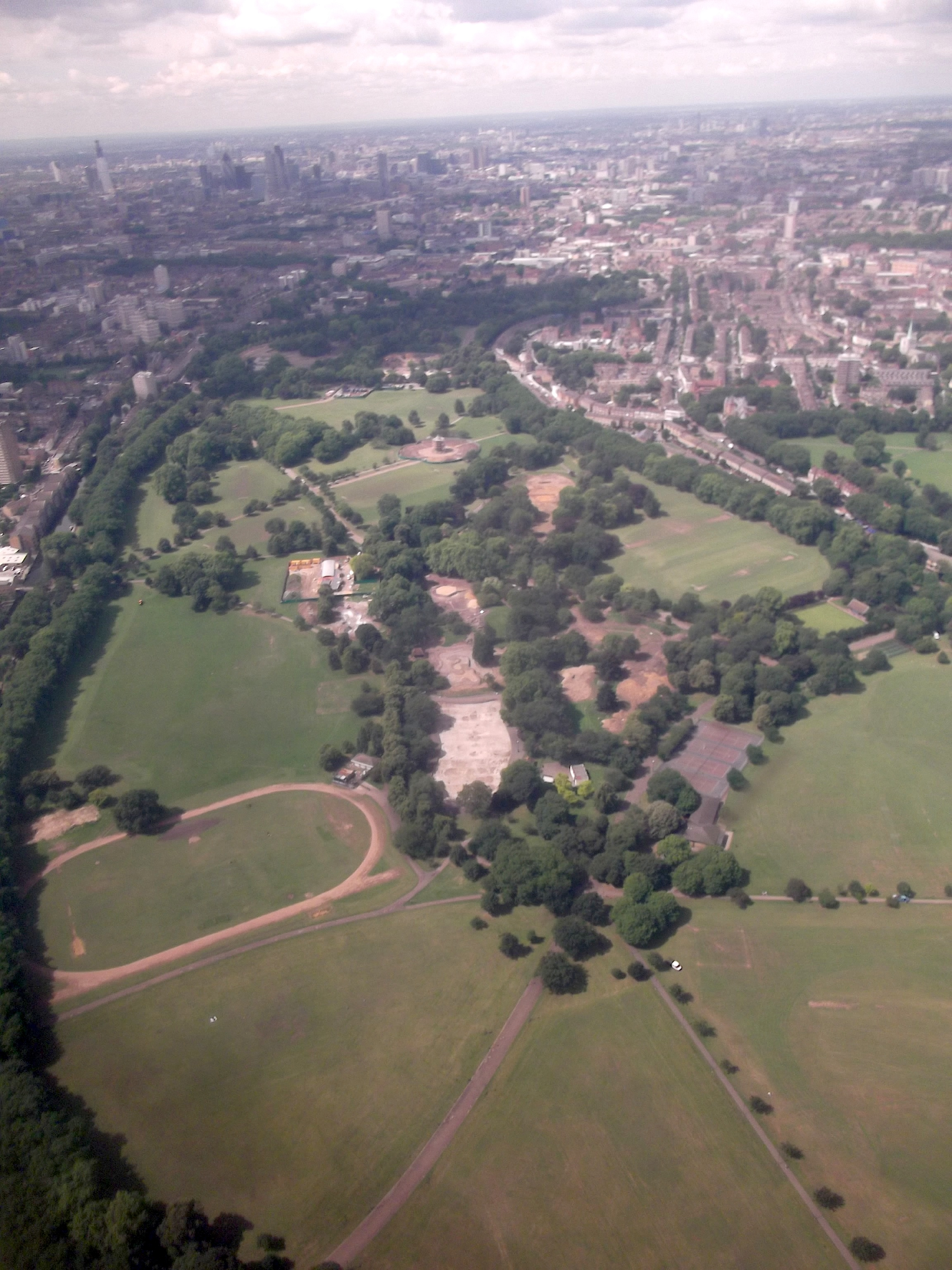
Aerial view of Victoria Park (looking southwest, 2011)

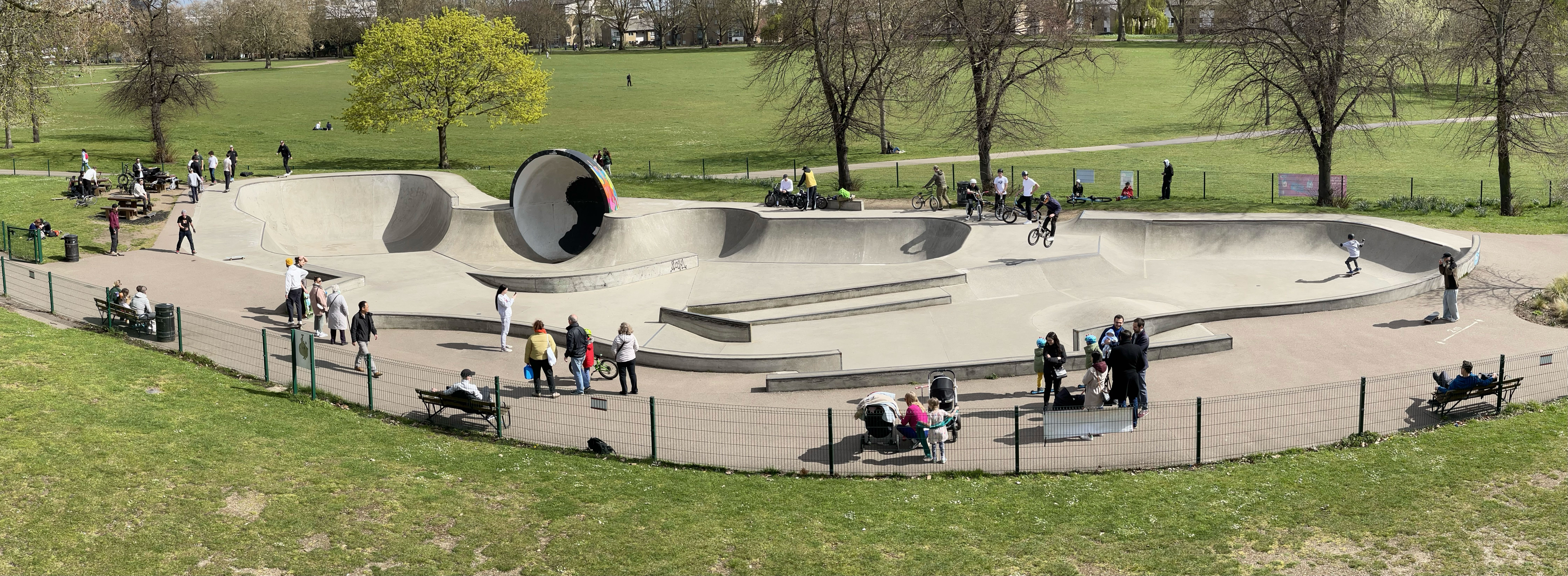
Elevated view of Victoria Park Raemers Skatepark (2022)

Victoria Park (known colloquially as Vicky Park or the People's Park) is a park in the London Borough of Tower Hamlets in East London, England.

It is the largest park in Tower Hamlets and one of London's most visited green spaces, with approximately 9 million visitors each year. The park spans 86.18 hectares (213.0 acres) of open space and opened to the public in 1845.

== Location ==
Victoria Park is situated towards the north-eastern edge of the London Borough of Tower Hamlets. It is bordered by Bethnal Green to the west, Bow to the south and Hackney Wick to the east. It is bordered by the London Borough of Hackney to the north.

Grove Road (A1205) crosses through Victoria Park, and as a result the areas on either side of the road may be designated as the 'east' or 'west' of the park.

There are numerous gates around the park, for pedestrians, bicycles and motor vehicles.

== History ==
=== Origins ===
Victoria Park Act 1842
- Act of Parliament
- Parliament of the United Kingdom
- Long title: An Act to extend an Act passed in the Fourth and Fifth Years of Her present Majesty, for enabling Her Majesty's Commissioners of Woods to purchase certain Lands for Victoria Park.
- Citation: 5 & 6 Vict. c. 20
- Territorial extent: United Kingdom

Dates
- Royal assent: 13 May 1842
- Commencement: 13 May 1842 (Note: The Acts of Parliament (Commencement) Act 1793.)
Other legislation
Amends	York House and Victoria Park Act 1841
Amended by	Crown Lands (Copyholds) Act 1851

Status: Amended

Text of statute as originally enacted

A mass petition to Queen Victoria, in support of a recommendation by epidemiologist William Farr, led to the creation of the park. The UK Parliament passed the York House and Victoria Park Act 1841 (4 & 5 Vict. c. 27), which enabled the Crown Estate to purchases 218 acres (88 ha) which were laid out by the London planner and architect Sir James Pennethorne between 1842 and 1846. A part of the area was known as Bonner Fields, after Bishop Bonner, the last lord of the manor of Stepney. Bonner's Hall, also known as Bonner's Palace, served as a residence of the Bishops of London, and was pulled down in 1845 to make way for Victoria Park. The land had originally been parkland, associated with the Bishop's Palace, but by the mid-1800s had been spoiled by the extraction of gravel, and clay for bricks.

The park was opened to the public in 1845. It is reminiscent of Regent's Park, having been designed by Pennethorne's teacher John Nash, and is considered by some as the finest park in the East End. It is bounded on two sides by canals: the Regent's Canal lies to the west, while its branch, once known as the Hertford Union Canal, runs along the southern edge of the park. There is a gate named after Edmund Bonner, and guarding the main entrance at Sewardstone Road are replica statues of the Dogs of Alcibiades, the originals of which stood here from 1912 to 2009 until vandalism led to their being removed, restored and rehoused elsewhere in the park.

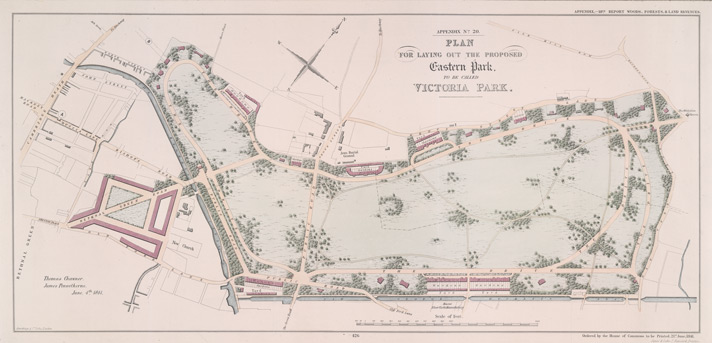
A drawing of the proposed layout published in 1841.

Two pedestrian alcoves are located at the east end of the park near the Hackney Wick war memorial where they were placed in 1860. They are surviving fragments of the old London Bridge, demolished in 1831, and were part of the 1760 refurbishment of the 600-year-old bridge, by Sir Robert Taylor and George Dance the Younger. They provided protection for pedestrians on the narrow carriageway. The insignia of Bridge House Estates can be seen inside these alcoves, which have been Grade II listed since 1951.

The Lido opened in 1936 and reopened in 1952 following damage during the Second World War; it was closed in 1986 and demolished in 1990.

=== The People's Park ===
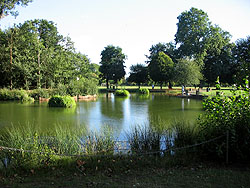
The bathing pond at Victoria Park (2005). Unused for bathing since the 1930s, it is now popular with anglers.

In the latter half of the 19th century, Victoria Park became an essential amenity for the working classes of the East End. For some East End children in the 1880s, this may have been the only large stretch of uninterrupted greenery they ever encountered. Facilities like the Bathing Pond (picture right) —later superseded by the park lido—would have introduced many to swimming in an era when many public baths (like that at Shacklewell) were still simply communal washing facilities.

Victoria Park's reputation as the 'People's Park' grew. It became a centre for political meetings and rallies. The park occupies much of the space between Tower Hamlets, an area that experienced much poverty in the 19th century and with a tradition of socialist and revolutionary agitation, and Hackney, a more genteel part of the city, but heir to a legacy of religious dissent and non-conformism that led to its own brand of reformism. So there was a lot of activity at Speaker's Corners.

Although anyone could set up their own soapbox, the biggest crowds were usually drawn to 'star' socialist speakers such as William Morris and Annie Besant.

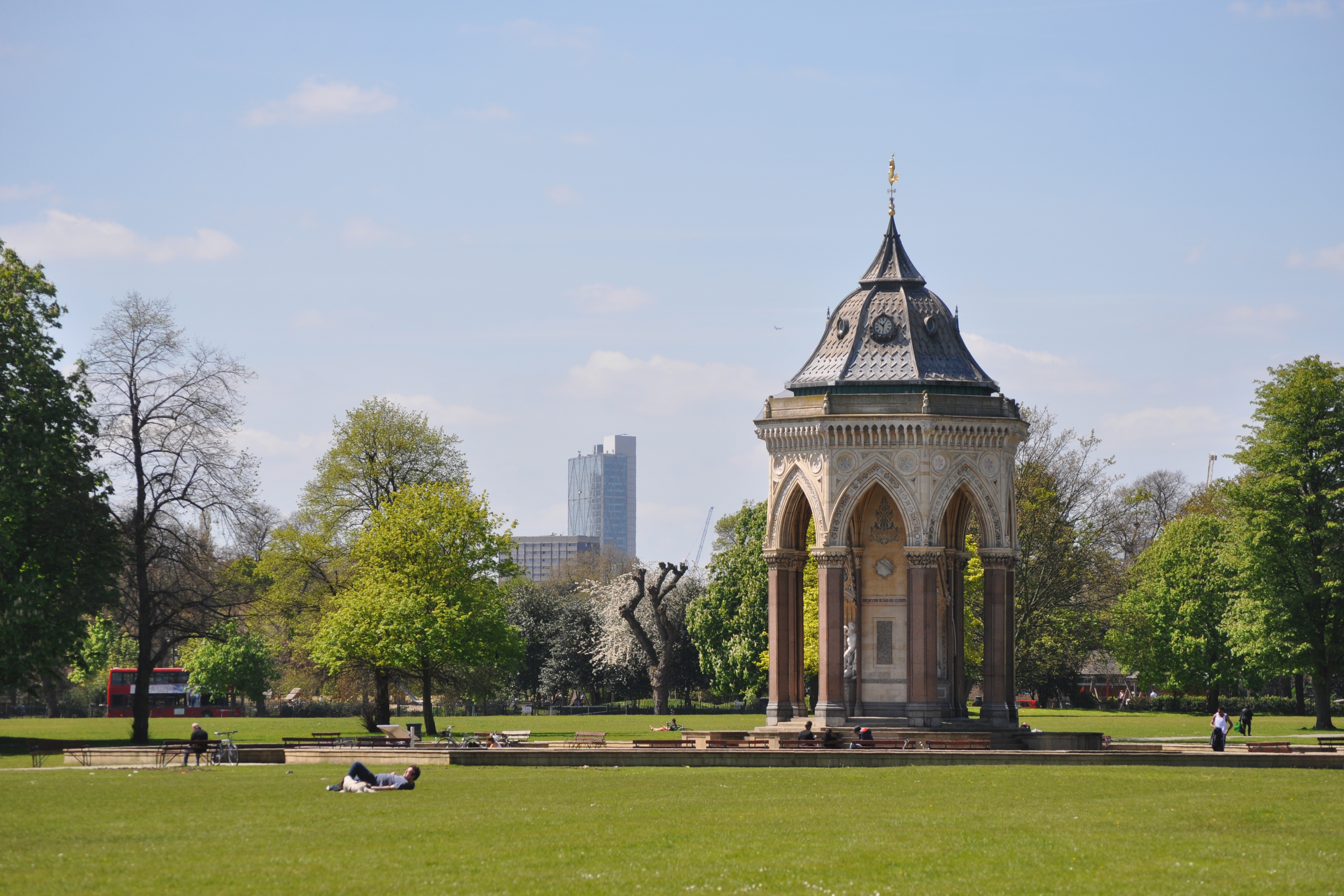
Grade II* listed drinking fountain in Victoria Park (2016), erected by Baroness Angela Burdett-Coutts in 1862.

This description by J. H. Rosney, correspondent for Harper's Magazine (February 1888) evokes a scene:

On the big central lawn are scattered numerous groups, some of which are very closely packed. Almost all the religious sects of England and all the political and social parties are preaching their ideas and disputing [...] On this lawn the listener, as his fancy prompts him, may assist on Malthusianism, atheism, agnosticism, secularism, Calvinism, socialism, anarchism, Salvationism, Darwinism, and even, in exceptional cases, Swedenborgianism and Mormonism. I once heard there a prophet, a man who professed to be inspired by the Holy Ghost; but this prophet ended by being locked up in an asylum, where he will have to convert the doctor before he can recover his liberty.

The tradition of public speaking in the park continued until well after the Second World War, and was still later reflected in politically oriented rock concerts, such as those held by Rock Against Racism and the Anti-Nazi League in the 1970s and 1980s. It is still not uncommon for marches or demonstrations to begin or end in Victoria Park.

On 26 June 2014, a campaign to revive the Speakers' Corner at Victoria Park was launched at a democratic theatre event held in Shoreditch Town Hall. Hosted by The People Speak, a participatory campaign and events group, 66 audience members deliberated over how to use the pooled cash revenue from their tickets, and eventually voted to recreate the well-known tradition of free speech and debate in Hyde Park in East London's Victoria Park. The campaign formally launched in July 2014.

=== Second World War ===
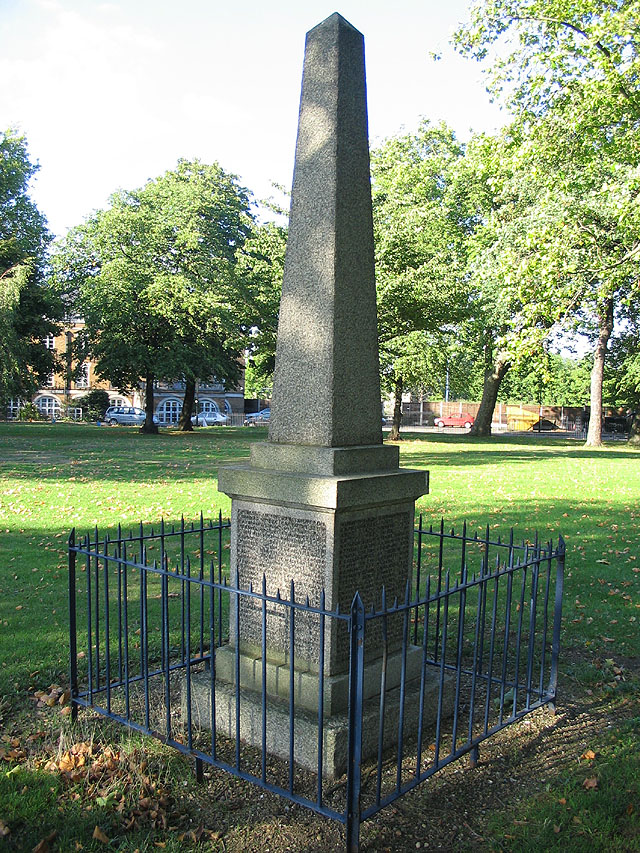
The Hackney Wick Great War memorial (2005)

During the Second World War, Victoria Park was largely closed to the public and effectively became one huge Ack-Ack (anti-aircraft) site. The gun emplacements conveniently straddled the path of German Luftwaffe bombers looping north west after attacking the docks and warehouses further south in what is now Tower Hamlets, and so the park was of some strategic importance.

Prisoner of war camps were erected along the north eastern edge parallel to Victoria Park Road and were used to house both Germans and Italians. An air raid shelter was built underground just inside St Marks Gate. On 15 October 1940 a bomb made a direct hit, trapping around a hundred inside and killing fifteen. Much of the park was taken to be used as part of the war effort, which much of the earth being used for allotments, military stations and barrage balloon sites, even the park railings were melted down to be re-used.

More controversially, anti-aircraft activity in the park has been implicated in the crowd panic that caused the Bethnal Green tube disaster of 1943. Some eyewitness accounts have led to the suggestion that, after several air raid alerts, the panic run for shelter was caused by a gigantic explosion of noise from the direction of the park. A BBC documentary on the event suggests that this was due to the first firing of the new Z-Battery anti-aircraft rockets. The UK Ministry of Defence, however, disputes this account.

The war destroyed many of the park's beautiful early features: three lodges including the Bonner Lodge were completely reduced to rubble, the palm house was shattered, St Augustine's Church collapsed in on itself and the pagoda, moorish shelter and lido were all damaged. With finances tight after the war ended, most were torn down rather than repaired.

=== Modern ===
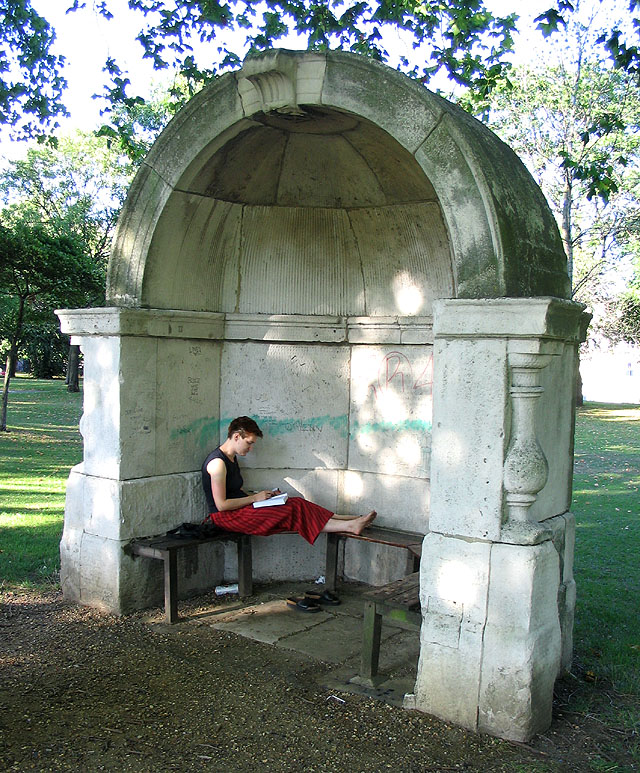
This pedestrian alcove is a surviving fragment of the old London Bridge, demolished in 1831. Two have stood in Victoria Park since 1860 (2005)

In 1986 the Greater London Council was abolished and responsibility for the park was transferred to the two boroughs within whose boundaries it lay, Tower Hamlets and Hackney, through a joint management board. In 1990 Tower Hamlets assumed full management control and in 1994 the Boundary Commission transferred the Hackney section of the park to Tower Hamlets.

In recent times, Victoria Park became noted for its open-air music festivals, often linked with a political cause. In 1978, Rock Against Racism organised a protest event against growth of far-right organisations such as the National Front. The concert was played by The Clash, Steel Pulse, X-Ray Spex, The Ruts, Sham 69, Generation X, and the Tom Robinson Band. The 1980 rock docudrama Rude Boy features The Clash playing at an Anti-Nazi League event in the park.

London International Festival of Theatre presented pyrotechnics company Group F in 2001 and again in 2004, led by pyrotechnician Christophe Berthonneau. In 2006 through to 2010, Paradise Gardens, a free community festival, produced by Remarkable Productions working in partnership with Tower Hamlets Council's Arts and Events department, re-imagined Victorian pleasure gardens for the modern era, before moving in 2012 to London Pleasure Gardens in Newham. Radiohead played two concerts in the park on 24–25 June 2008. Madness celebrated their 30th year with a fifth Madstock festival there on 17 July 2009.

The park has also become popular amongst dance music's biggest names; Dutch DJ Tiësto played at Victoria Park in 2009 and again in 2010.

On 24–25 July 2010, Victoria Park was the site of the first High Voltage Festival. Victoria Park has also hosted Field Day, The Apple Cart, Underage Festival, Lovebox Festival, and All Points East.

For children, Victoria Park is host to: a One O'Clock Club for under-fives and a programme of summer activities and a children's play park including a paddling pool that runs from 1–5pm in the summer months.

The oldest model boat club in the world, the Victoria Model Steam Boat Club, founded in the Park on 15 July 1904, is still active today and holds up to 17 of their Sunday regattas a year. The VMSB Club runs straight-running boats just as they did 100 years ago but have also progressed to radio controlled boats and hydroplanes. The first Regatta is traditionally held on Easter Sunday and the Steam Regatta is always held on the first Sunday in July.

The Park is also the home of Tower Hamlets Football Club and Victoria Park United Football club, Tower Hamlets Cricket Club, Victoria Park Harriers & Tower Hamlets Athletics Club, which has its headquarters at St. Augustine's Hall located at the north-east corner of the Park. The club celebrated its 80th anniversary in 2006.

During the summer cricket is played every evening on the park's three all-weather wickets, organised by the Victoria Park Community Cricket League. The park also has a popular three-lane cricket net, free to use at all times. It was refurbished to a high standard at the end of 2005, paid for by a grant from the England and Wales Cricket Board.

The park is open daily from 7:00am to dusk.

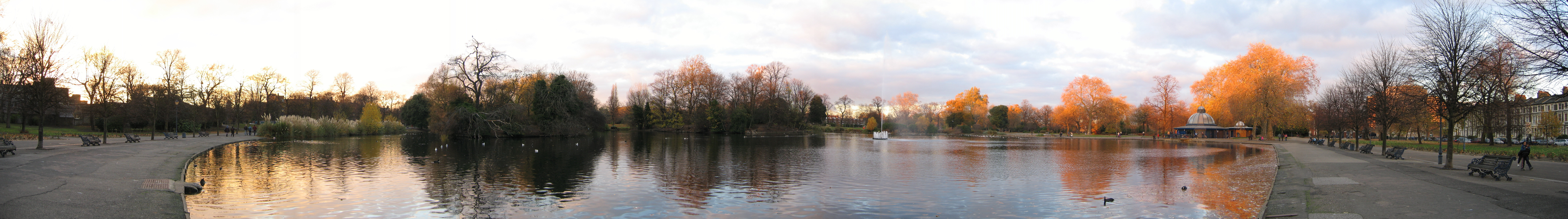
Victoria Park lake (2004)

In 2010 the National Lottery Big Lottery Fund awarded the London Borough of Tower Hamlets a £4.5 million grant towards a £12 million programme of major improvements to Victoria Park. Plans included a new building, the Hub, comprising a cafe, public toilets, community rooms and adult play facilities to promote healthy living.

The landscape has been restored in many places, and the Old English gardens restored to include new water features. In 1842 a pagoda was put in London's Hyde Park as an entrance to its Chinese Exhibition, and when the exhibition finished it was moved to Victoria Park's island in the west boating lake for ornamental purposes. The original architect for the park, Pennethorne, designed a bridge to the island that matched the style of the pagoda; this was never built, however, and during World War II the pagoda suffered much damage.

The pagoda was eventually demolished in the 1950s, while the water surrounding the island was filled in, shrinking the lake and making what was the island part of the park landscape. With the park's refurbishments that began in 2010 it was decided to restore the island to its former glory; the lake was extended back around the original area, the pagoda was replicated through the use of many photographs and eye-witness information and then, to complete Pennethorne's unfinished vision, the plans for his original bridge were discovered and the bridge built after over 100 years. As a finishing touch, pedalos and row boats were brought back on to the West lake, a feature which had been missing from the park for decades.

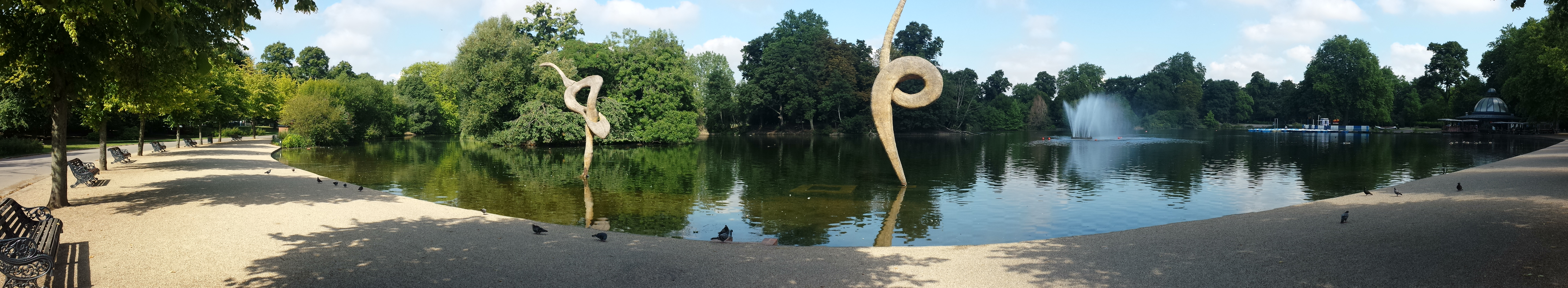
Victoria Park lake (2013)

The Burdett-Coutts fountain (named after the Victorian philanthropist Angela Burdett-Coutts) had a partial restoration of its intricate granite carvings and sculptures. In recent years the fountain had been fenced off due to graffiti and vandalism, but along with the restoration the fences were removed, and four symmetrical mirror pools were placed around the fountain along with decorative flower beds. The area is now a public space, with many benches offering an attractive place to sit.

A modern addition to the park is the Memoryscape trail, an audio trail winding through the park that visitors listen to using headphones. The trail consists of many historical facts and tidbits of information, and includes accounts from people who grew up in and around the park, with one person for example reminiscing about the prisoner of war camp in the park during World War 2. Visitors can either download the tracks from the council's website and put them on their own device, or they can get a pair of pre-loaded headphones from the hub in exchange for a small refundable deposit.

As part of the 2012 Summer Olympics, the Romanian Cultural Institute commissioned artist Ernö Bartha to produce two sculptures Bird and Skyscraper in the West Lake. Despite both being made of hay enforced with steel frames they still remain in the park and have become a prominent feature of the lake receiving their own plaques in 2015.

== Facilities ==
There are public toilets within the park. There are three cafes in the park – The Pavilion Cafe and Blas in the west and The Hub in the east.An application to convert the Victoria & Albert building in the west to a cafe was submitted to Tower Hamlets council in July 2026.

A weekly Sunday food market opened in 2017 occupying Central Drive and some of the adjacent Carriage Drive to the west. A smaller food market also trades from Central Drive on Saturdays.

There are two children's playgrounds, one on either side of the park, as well as sporting facilities and a skatepark in the east.

The park is home to many historic artifacts and features and has decorative gardens and wilder natural areas as well as open grass lands. It also hosts a lawn bowls club. There are two lakes within the park which are home to various wildlife, as well as a model boating lake. There is also a historical bandstand, which hosts an annual summer programme of free performances.

Since the 2006 Lovebox Festival, Victoria Park has increasingly been used as a concert venue for large-scale music productions including All Points East. The park is approximately a mile away from the Queen Elizabeth Olympic Park. Owing to its proximity to the Olympic Park, it became a venue for the BT London Live event along with Hyde Park during the London 2012 Olympic Games.

The park underwent a £12 million refurbishment in 2011 and 2012, and many of the park's historical and heritage features have been reinstated or repaired. It has won the Green Flag People's Choice Award for the most popular public green space in 2012, 2014 and 2015, the only park in the UK to have won the award three times, and often appears in the Top-10.

The park is Grade II* listed on the English Heritage Register of Historic Parks and Gardens.

=== Bowls Club ===
Victoria Park Bowls Club
- Founded: c.1900
- Location: Victoria Park, Bow, Tower Hamlets, London E9 7DD
- Colors: Blue Yellow
- Affiliations: Bowls England, Middlesex Bowling Association, London Parks Bowling Association
- Website: victoriaparkbowlsclub.org.uk

Victoria Park Bowls Club is a lawn bowls club in the park. It is in the Bow East ward of London Borough of Tower Hamlets.

Founded in or around 1900, the club was an early member of the London Parks Bowling Association, providing the association's president in 1908. Its bowls green is currently provided and maintained by London Borough of Tower Hamlets.

The club offers annual memberships, and welcomes visitors, who pay an hourly rate. It has benefitted from support from local funding bodies to provide aids for people with disabilities to play bowls.

Victoria Park Bowls Club is affiliated to Bowls England, the Middlesex Bowling Association and the London Parks Bowling Association.

== Transport ==
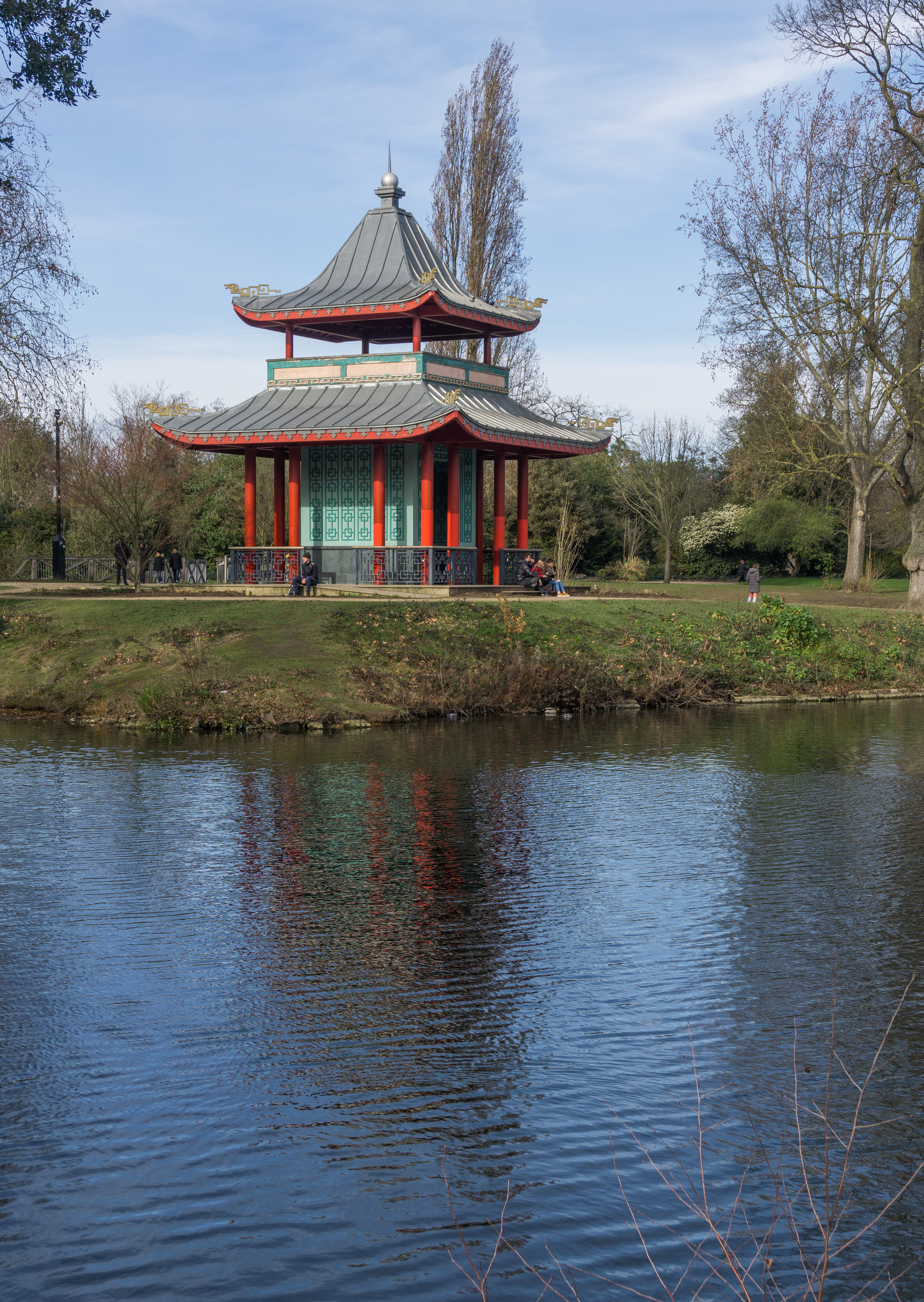
Chinese pavilion (2019)

London Buses Routes 277, 425 serve the heart of the park, 8, 339, D6, and Night Route N8 on Roman Road. 309 and D3 at London Chest Hospital via Approach Road. 388 (westbound) on Victoria Park Road.

Mile End tube station for the Central line, District line, Hammersmith & City line services to Stratford, Upminster, Barking or Central London is 10min via Grove Road, you can take the 277 or 425 to Mile End which is 5min away. Cambridge Heath station for National Rail services to Liverpool Street and Enfield or Chingford is 5mins away via Bishops Way. Victoria Park had its own rather grand station Victoria Park railway station (London), on the North London Railway, closed in 1943. The station survived into the 1960s, but when the line to Stratford reopened, it was replaced by Hackney Wick railway station, which is also a short walk from the eastern end of the Park.

The Regent's Canal borders the west side of the park, while Hertford Union Canal borders the south side of the park; this offers access to walking or cycling on their towpaths. The National Cycle Route 1 (NCR1) passes here on the Hertford Union Canal. Mare Street or Mile End or Hackney Wick can easily be reached from here.

The northern end of the Greenway walk/cycle path to Beckton, via Queen Elizabeth Olympic Park and Newham General Hospital, starts nearby on the eastern side of Victoria Park.

== Awards ==
In summer 2008, the park was voted London's best local park by Time Out magazine.

In 2011 it won its first Green Flag award (which it has retained every year since,) and it was again voted London's favourite park, this time in the national People's Choice Award, a UK wide competition. In 2013 Victoria Park was also certified a Green Heritage Site by English Heritage and Keep Britain Tidy, an award given in recognition of achieving the required standard in the management and interpretation of a site with local or national historic importance.

In 2013 the park came second in a national vote to find the public's favourite Green Flag Awarded park, beaten only by Margam Country Park in south Wales from a field of 1,448 qualifying open spaces.

In 2014, Victoria Park reinstated itself as the most popular park in the UK, with over 13,000 votes in the Green Flag People's Choice Awards. The park also was once again rewarded both Green Flag and Green Heritage status.

As of November 2025, Victoria Park had retained the Green Flag People's Choice Award for a 13th consecutive year. It was also the only park in London in the top 10 that year.

== In popular culture ==
- The denouement of Sarah Waters' 1998 debut novel Tipping the Velvet plays out at a "Workers' Rally" held at the park in 1895.
- Appears in the 2004 film Spivs by Colin Teague, starring Rita Ora.
- Appears in the 2013 music video Paper Heart, by Chlöe Howl.
- Appears in the 2014 film Pride starring Imelda Staunton, Bill Nighy and Dominic West.
- Appears in the 2014 film Good People starring James Franco and Kate Hudson.
- Appears in the 2014 John Lewis Christmas advert: Monty the Penguin can be seen around the West Boating Lake.
- Appears in Catastrophe starring Sharon Horgan and Rob Delaney.

== See also ==
- Underage Festival
