= Lea Valley Walk =

Long-distance footpath in South East England

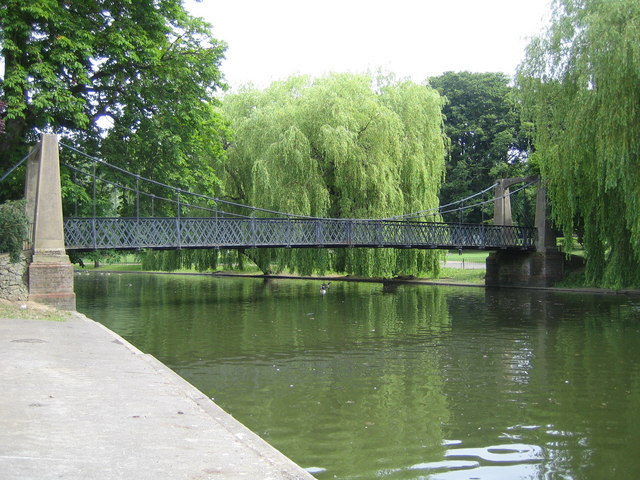
- The trail goes through Wardown Park
- Length: 50 mi (80 km)
- Location: South East England
- Trailheads: Leagrave; Limehouse Basin
- Use: Hiking, Cycling, Angling, Boating
- Season: All year

The Lea Valley Walk is a 50-mile (80 km) long-distance path located between Leagrave, the source of the River Lea near Luton, and the Thames, at Limehouse Basin, Limehouse, east London. From its source much of the walk is rural. At Hertford the path follows the towpath of the River Lee Navigation, and it becomes increasingly urbanised as it approaches London. The walk was opened in 1993 and is waymarked throughout using a swan logo.

== Route ==
=== Stage 1 Leagrave - Hatfield ===
Approximately 19.9 miles (32.0 km)

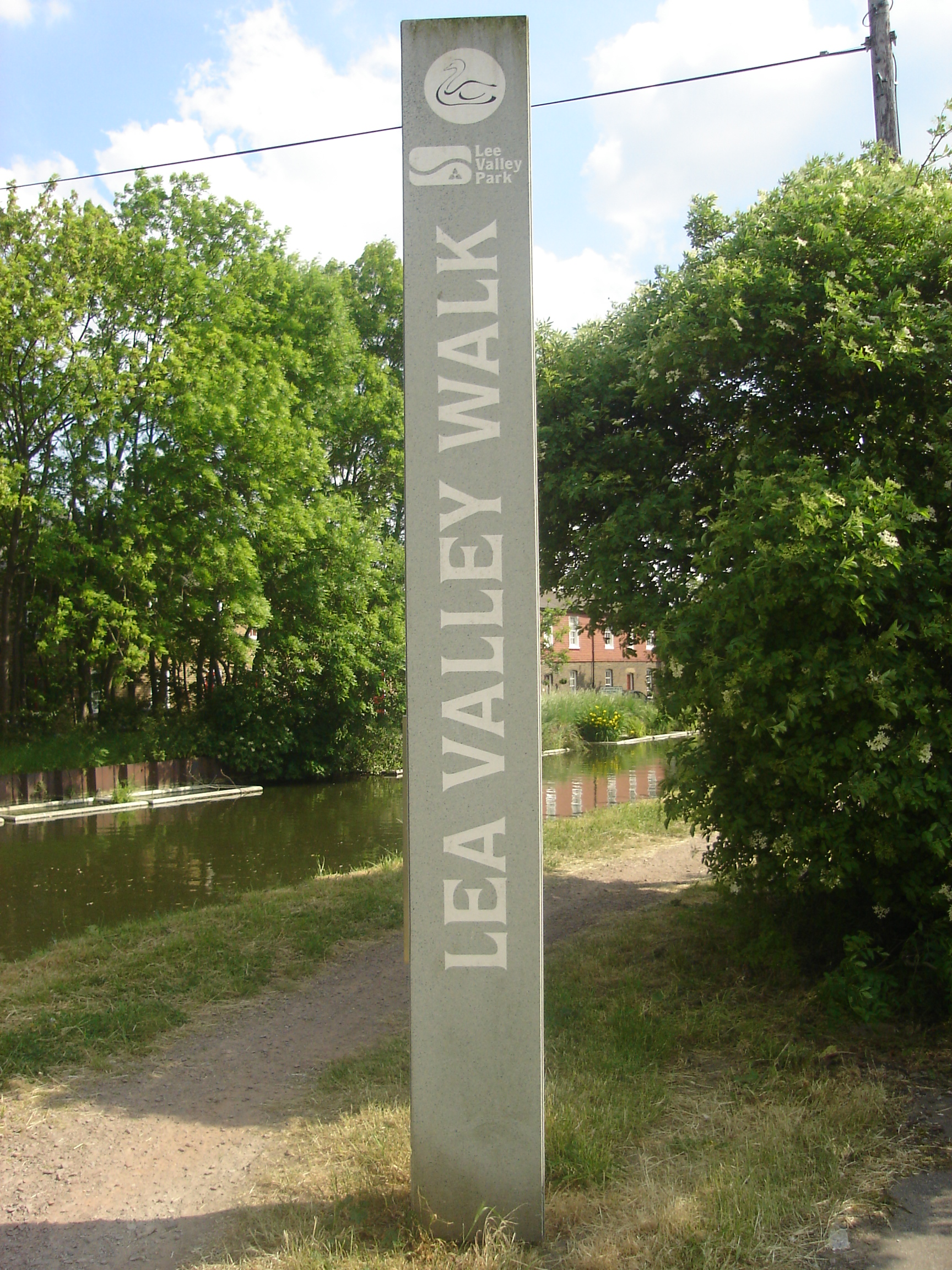
Signpost above Enfield Lock. A glimpse of Government Row in the background. Note the variant spellings of the river

The walk can be accessed close to Leagrave railway station at Leagrave Common where there are a number of springs and ponds from which the Lea forms. The first part of the walk is through the suburbs of Luton. After passing through Wardown Park the path joins the A6 road and goes through the town centre passing St Mary's Church as it heads close to the runways of Luton Airport. The A505 road is crossed as the trail makes its way through open countryside towards Harpenden.

The path descends into the Lea Valley, passing under the railway lines before crossing the B653 road. The route now follows the track of a disused railway, the former Luton, Dunstable and Welwyn Junction line. After Harpenden the path leaves the railway track and heads uphill into Wheathampstead, then it goes through the village, past the church, and crosses over to the other bank of the river. The path now follows the river towards Water End Lane and the grounds of Brocket Hall where it crosses the middle of a golf course on its way towards Lemsford. The path goes under the A1 road to Stanborough Park.

=== Stage 2 Hatfield - Broxbourne ===
Approximately 16.1 miles (25.9 km)

The original path runs alongside the A414 road in the grounds of Home Park Hatfield cutting through a small woodland to the Cecil Saw Mill. A short stretch of road leads to a bridleway and then the river. The path crosses the river at Holwell Bridge the trail continues through woodland opposite Holwell Court and joins the Cole Green Way. The path has been diverted due to access issues and now follows roads past the New QEII Hospital in Welwyn Garden City to join the Cole Green Way the disused Welwyn to Hertford railway line at the edge of the town. The route is shared with the Hertfordshire Chain Walk as it approaches the outskirts of Hertford. The path continues to Hertford town centre passing Hertford Town F.C and Hertford Castle before following Maidenhead Street and Bull Plain to rejoin the River Lea.

At this point the Lea becomes the canalised River Lee Navigation. For the remainder of its length, the walk follows the towpath all the way to the Thames. The first lock located at the edge of the town is Hertford Lock. The rivers Beane and Rib enter the Lea on the opposite bank. The walk passes through the town of Ware which is the start of Lee Valley Park. Passing Ware Lock, Victorian gazebos can be seen in some of the far bank riverside gardens. The path goes under the A1170 road opposite the Saracen's Head public house and then passing Hardmead Lock. On the far bank is Amwell Quarry, an SSSI.

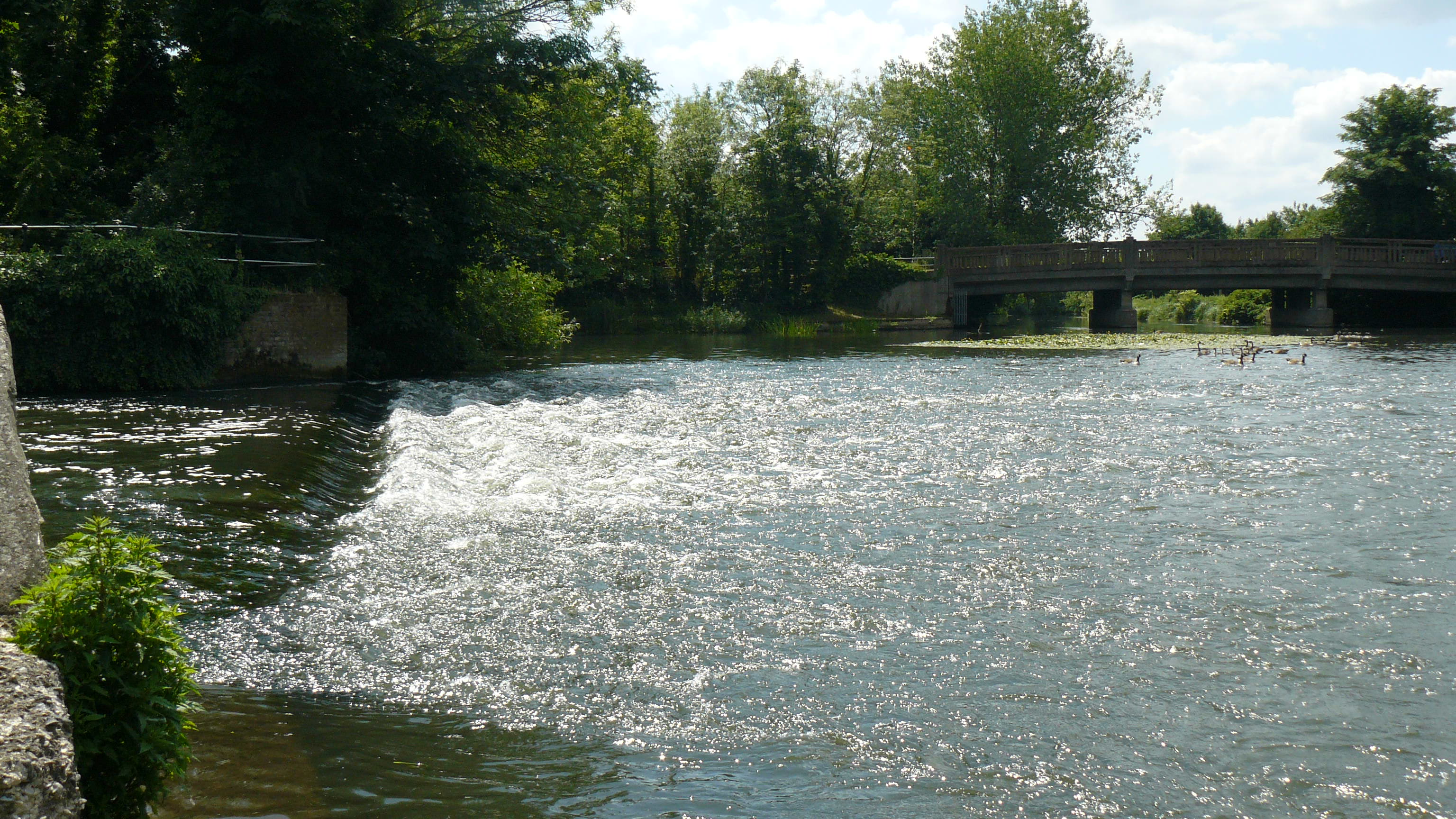
Dobbs Weir lies on the trail

Stanstead Lock is next before continuing under the A414 road towards Rye House, in Hoddesdon. Attractions nearby include Rye House Stadium, the gatehouse of Rye House and RSPB Rye Meads nature reserve . Close to the confluence of the River Stort and Lea is Feildes Weir. Passing Feildes Weir Lock, the Rye House Power Station dominates the skyline. Crossing the river opposite the Fish and Eels public house which is above Dobbs Weir and then over the Hoddesdon to Nazeing road close to the Lee Valley Camping site (Permanently closed 2010) where a stretch of the Old River Lea can be seen. With the canal to the right the path passes Dobbs Weir Lock and then onto Carthagena Lock behind the lock is Carthagena Weir. Below the lock the tail end of the weir pool joins the main river. The path carries on under the Broxbourne to the Nazeing road bridge, close to Broxbourne railway station.

=== Stage 3 Broxbourne - Lea Bridge Road (Walthamstow Marshes) ===
Approximately 13.1 miles (21.1 km)

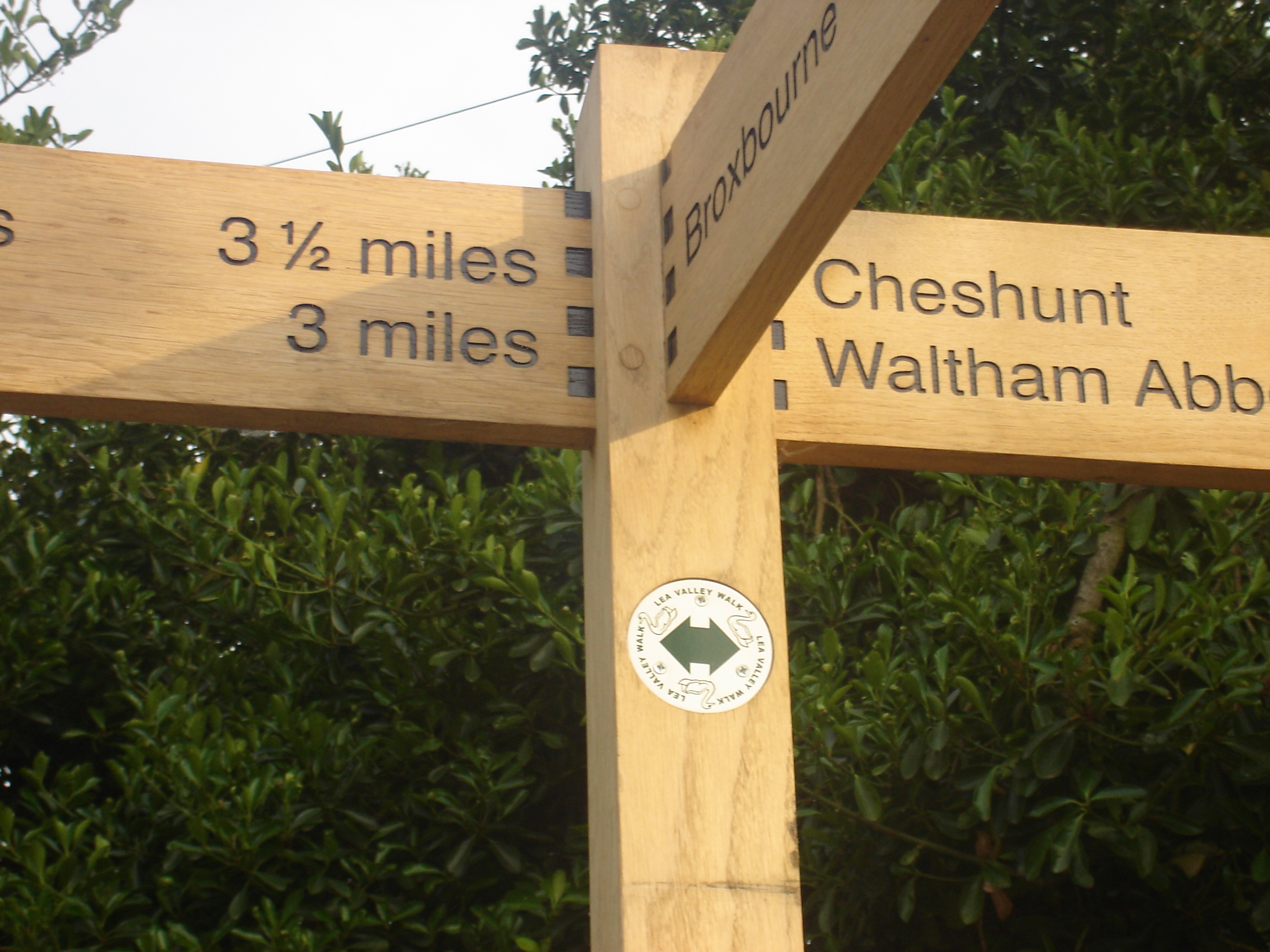
Waymark on the walk

The Crown public house is located adjacent to towpath. Attractions in this area include a boat centre and Broxbourne Mill. Adjacent to the walk, the Lee Valley leisure pool closed in 2008. The river is crossed to the west bank by bridge. On the opposite bank there are a number of riverside houses. Over a small bridge under which flows the Broxbourne Mill Stream. Above Aqueduct Lock a channel from the river feeds into Kings Weir and a stretch of the Old River Lea can be found. On both sides of the river mature flooded gravel workings can be seen, a legacy of this areas large sand and gravel industry, some of which form part of the Turnford and Cheshunt Pits (SSSI). Continuing past Cheshunt Lock. Close to Cheshunt railway station is the Lee Valley Youth Hostel. A glimpse of the Small River Lea can be seen which flows nearby under Windmill Lane. Past Waltham Common Lock and then Waltham Town Lock which is adjacent to the Showground Site the chosen venue to host the 2012 Summer Olympics canoeing and kayak slalom events will be known as the Broxbourne White Water Canoe Centre. The towns of Waltham Cross and Waltham Abbey are close by.

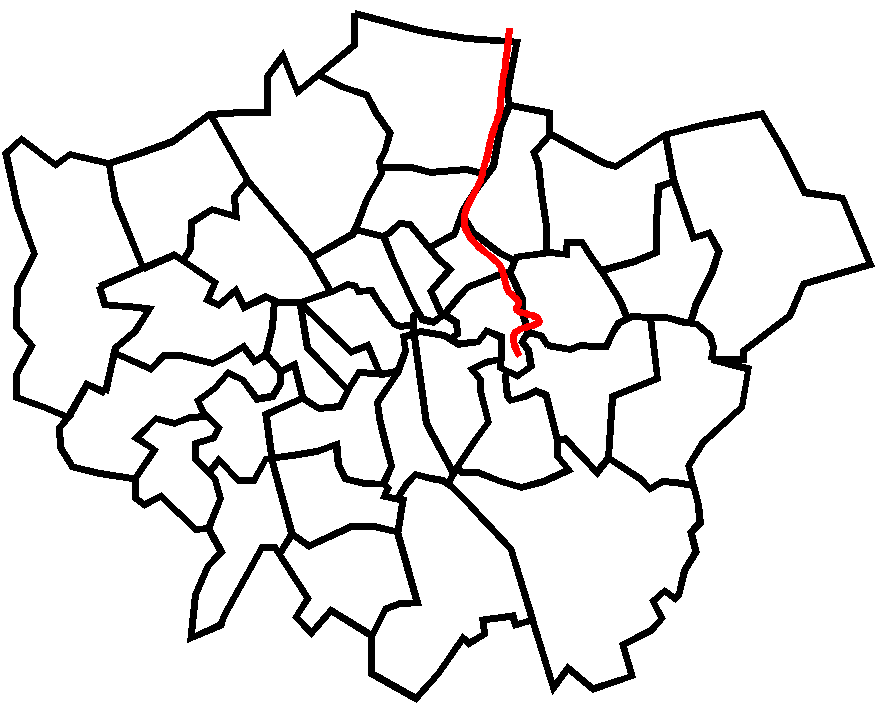
Lea Valley Walk within Greater London

On the A121 road bridge stands the Old English Gentlemen public house (closed May 2008). Close by are the Royal Gunpowder Mills which are open to the public. The path goes under the M25 motorway to Rammey Marsh Lock. The river splits on the far bank and a section of the Old River Lea flows through the former Royal Small Arms Factory now a housing development known as Enfield Island Village. The Victorian Terraced houses on the east bank are former Small Arms factory workers' houses known as Government Row. Above Enfield Lock a new bridge leads to the housing estate. Passing the Greyhound public house and the lock. Adjacent to the Rifles public house (closed May 2008) is the Old River Lea and section 13 of the London Loop a Long-distance path can be joined. Crossing the bridge over the Swan and Pike pool a former barge turning basin.

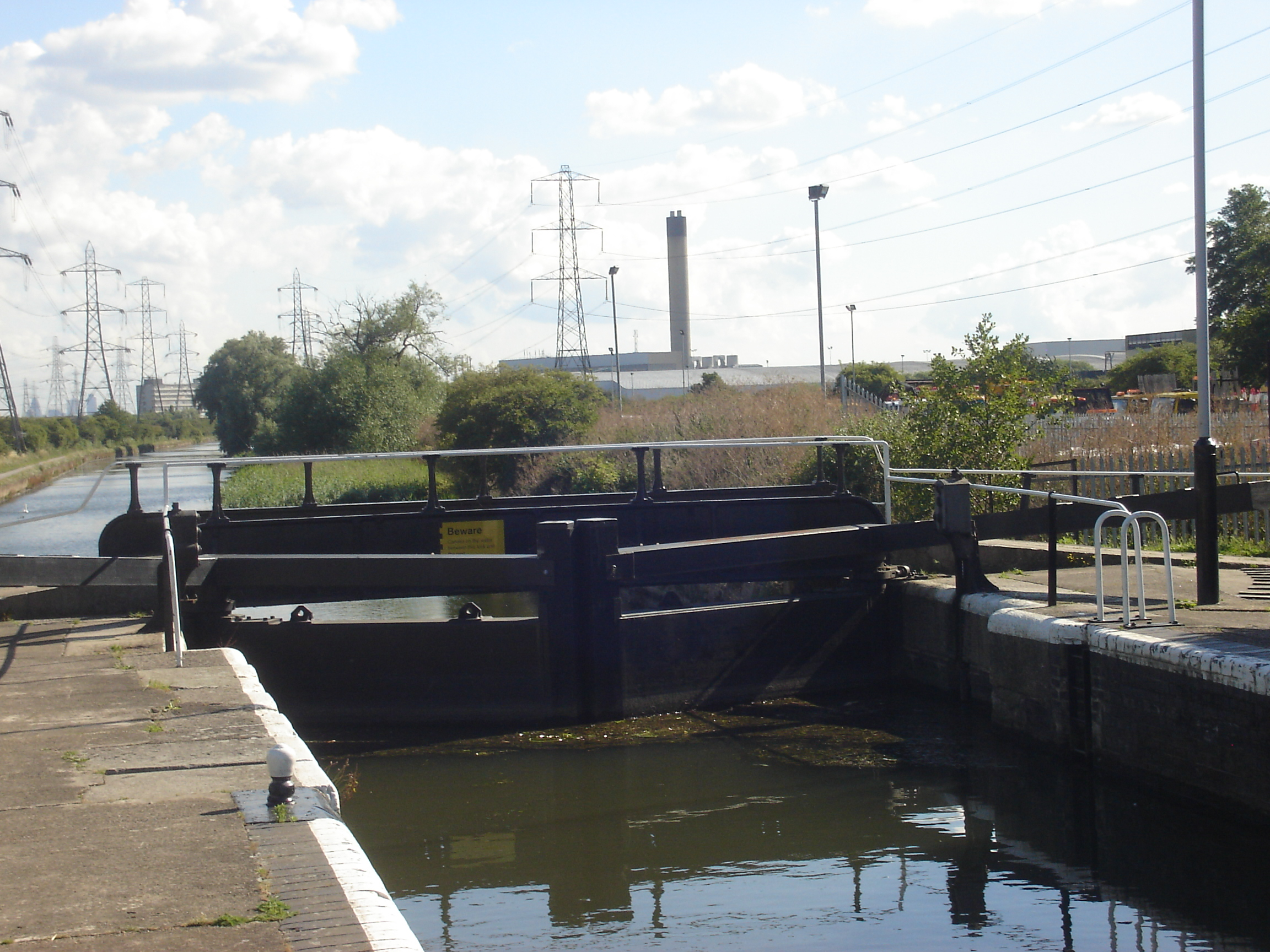
Looking south from Pickett's Lock with the chimney of the Edmonton Incinerator dominating the skyline

The grassed embankment of the King George V Reservoir is directly in front and is the first in the Lee Valley Reservoir Chain. Turkey Brook joins the Lee on the opposite bank. The far bank now comprises mainly industrial units. At Brimsdown Mossops Bridge connects to Mossops Creek and the Brimsdown Industrial Estate area. Before the paired lock gates at Ponder's End Lock come into view. The Ponders End Mill Stream leaves the Navigation to flow through the historic Wright's Flour Mill close by to Ponders End railway station. Above Ponders End lock opposite the towpath is the Navigation Inn, a former pumping station built in 1899. The inn offers moorings for passing boats and views of the grassed embankment of the King George V reservoir. Past the lock and under a road bridge the mill stream merges with the Lee on the far bank. To the east is the start of the William Girling Reservoir. The west bank opens up with views of the golf course– part of the Lee Valley Leisure Complex.

At Pickett's Lock the Pymmes Brook Trail can be joined. From the lock the 100 metre chimney of the Edmonton Incinerator dominates the skyline, and on the horizon the towers of Canary Wharf and the Swiss Re can be clearly seen. Following the towpath under the North Circular Road past the site of the Cooks Ferry Inn public house (well known music venue-demolished late 20th century for road widening). Both sides of the river are industrialised. The river opens up with views of Banbury Reservoir to the East and Tottenham Marshes. Under a small footbridge known locally as Chalk Bridge. Walking towards Stonebridge Lock with Lockwood Reservoir to the east.

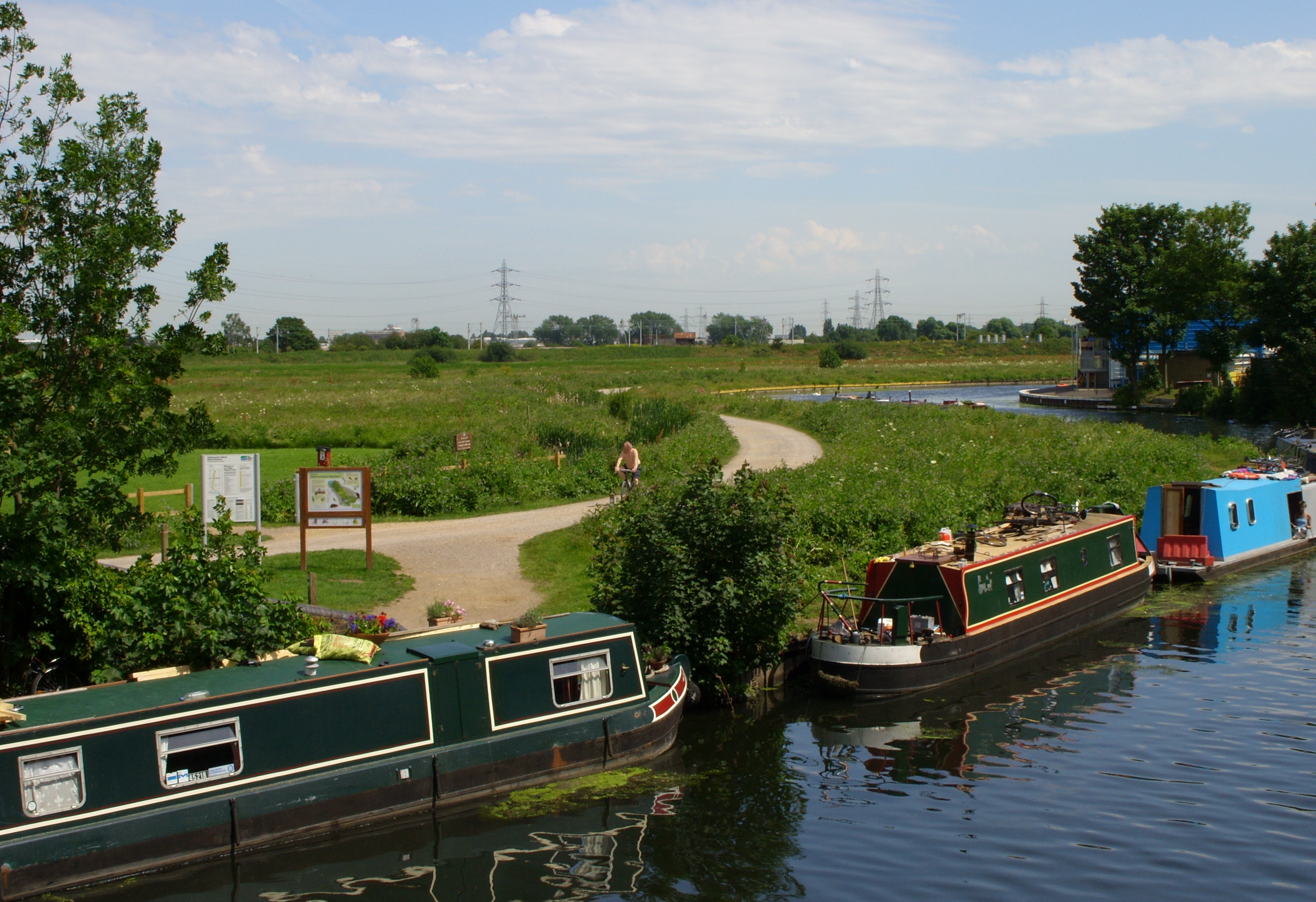
Walthamstow Marshes lie on the route

Crossing the river here it is less than 1 mile to Tottenham Lock. Pymmes Brook joins the Lee here. To the East are the High Maynard and Low Maynard reservoirs. Passing under Ferry Lane A503 road bridge. Close by is the Ferry Boat Inn public house and Tottenham Hale station. The path passes under the London Overground Gospel Oak to Barking line and Lea Valley Lines railway bridges as the towpath skirts the West Warwick Reservoir further to the east are the East Warwick Reservoir and the Walthamstow Reservoirs. The Coppermill Stream joins the Lea close to the Lee Valley Marina.Passing by Springfield Park the path crosses the river at Horseshoe Bridge. Passing under the Lea Valley Lines rail bridge. Walthamstow Marshes and Leyton Marshes are passed as the path heads towards Lea Bridge Road.

=== Stage 4 Lea Bridge Road (Walthamstow Marshes) - Limehouse Basin ===
Approximately 4.9 miles (7.9 km)

Amenities in Lea Bridge Road area include the Lee Valley Ice Centre, riding stables and two nature reserves; the Middlesex Filter Beds and the Waterworks Nature Reserve. The river splits at the Middlesex Filter Beds Weir where a section of the River Lea's natural channel flows in an easterly direction can be found. Still following the navigation which is known as the Hackney Cut at this point, the path passes the site of the redundant Pond Lane Flood Gates. The walk crosses a small footbridge to the east bank adjacent to Hackney Marshes. Passing under A106 road Eastway and then the East Cross Route. The path passes nearby Hackney Wick Stadium. The walk passes under the North London Line (now London Overground) railway and Rothbury Road. The Hertford Union Canal joins the river on the west bank before crossing Victoria Park.

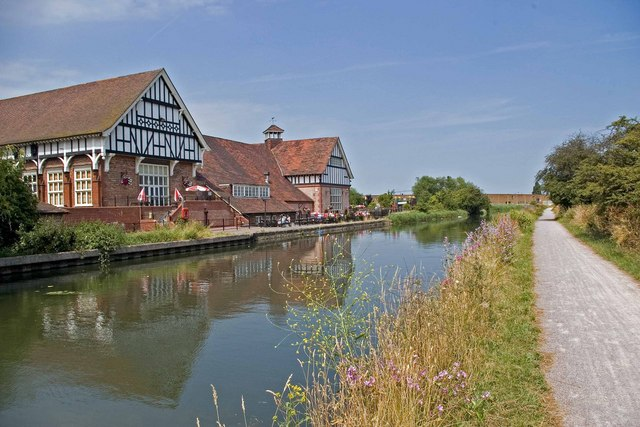
The Navigation Inn at Ponders End

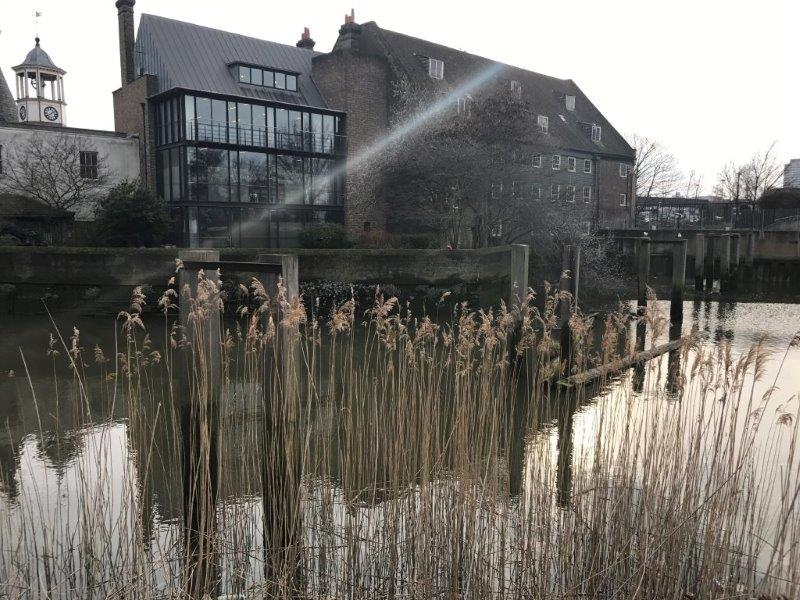
Three Mills - The Mill House

Heading towards Old Ford Lock the path links to the Capital Ring walk and then passing under The Greenway and the Docklands Light Railway close to Pudding Mill Lane station. Crossing to the opposite bank at Bow Road and crossing the river at Three Mills Bridge close to Three Mills. The walk continues under the District line and Hammersmith and City line close to Bromley-by-Bow. The river forks at Bow Locks with the Lee Navigation joining the tidal section of the river known as the Bow Back Rivers through Bow Creek to its confluence with the Thames. The path now follows the Limehouse Cut and passing the disused Bromley and Britannia Stop Locks to Limehouse Basin where the walk ends. Close by is the Thames Path.

== Other users ==
The towpath section of the river is popular with cyclists, and much of it forms part of National Cycle Route 1.

Angling is available on much of the river.

== Maps ==
Ordnance Survey Explorer 162.174.182.193 Landranger 166.177
