= River Lynch =

River in Hertfordshire, England

Coordinates: 51.75727°N 0.00253°W

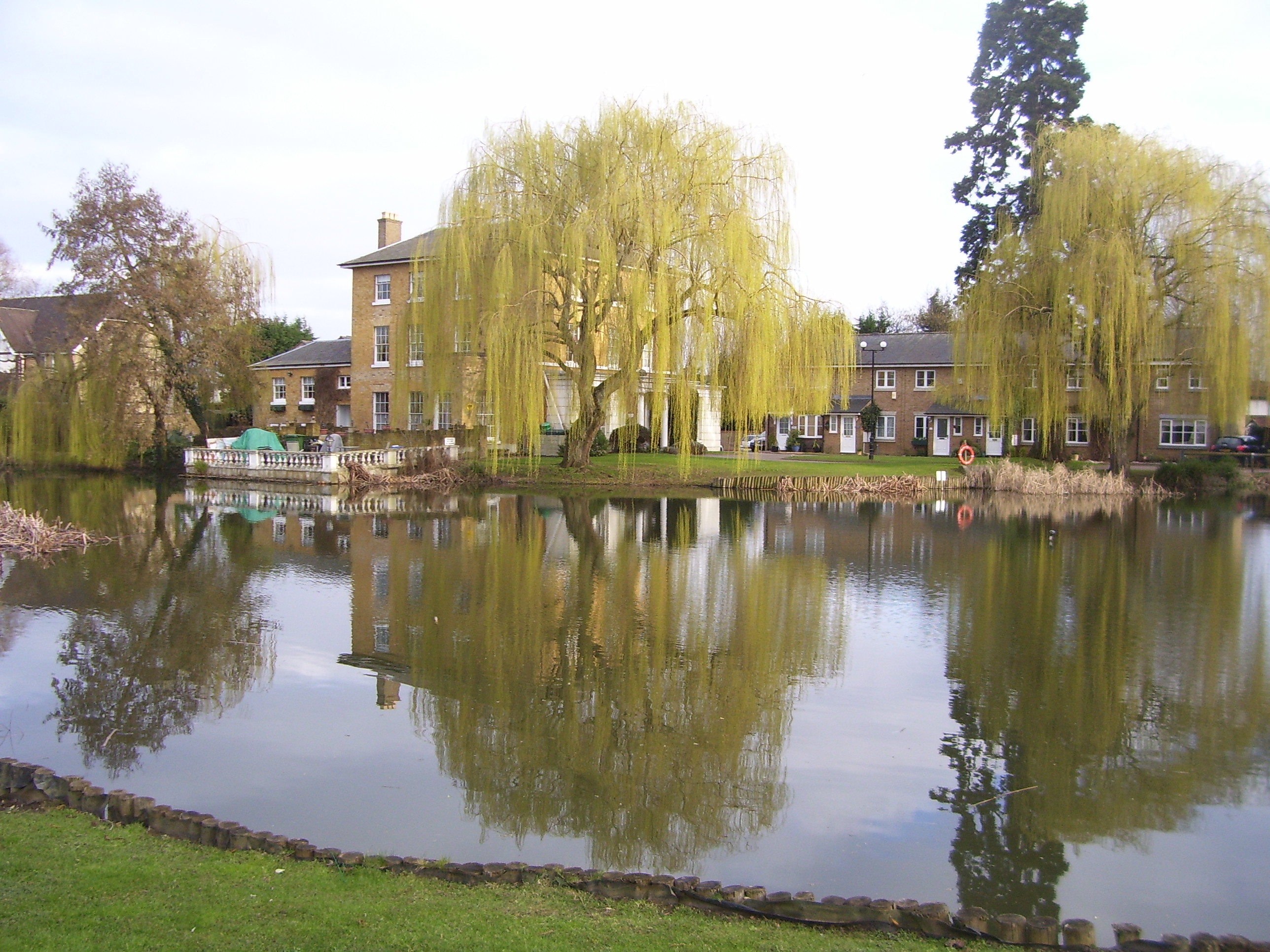
Lynch Mill Pond, Hoddesdon

The River Lynch, also known as the Lynch Brook, is a minor tributary of the River Lea in Hoddesdon, Hertfordshire, England.

== History ==
Historically, the River Lynch was named after the flat terraces, known as a lynch in Old English, which were formed when cultivating the steep slopes of a river valley, much the same as the rice terraces of South East Asia. The terrace, or lynch, was designed to reduce soil erosion by slowing the rapid run-off of water, and a series of these terraces gave the Lynch landscape a stepped appearance. These terraces were used extensively in the area directly above the River Lynch for the production of water cress during the 19th and early 20th centuries, using the fertile brick earth soils of the valley sides. The site of these former terraces is still clearly visible today within the Lampits housing estate, in the sloping open area below the course of the New River, leading downhill to Conduit Lane East and the Lynch Mill Pond. The terraces at the Lynch were situated above a deep funnel-shaped natural hole that carried water up from the chalk. The pond and watermill at Lynch Corner, fed by the spring, were described in medieval court rolls, as being ancient and known locally as 'Le Lince.' The New River, which passes directly overhead, closely hugging the 100 foot contour of the Lea Valley, destroyed much of the original landscape of the area, notably Lynch Hill and the Lynch Gap.

Modern course of the River Lynch

== Course ==
The course of the River Lynch has been altered extensively over the centuries for use in agriculture and then later for gravel extraction. The spring by the Lynch also supplies the Admiral's Walk Lake in the Lee Valley Park with clear water. Beginning in the rear property of Spring Lodge on Conduit Lane East, Hoddesdon, the Lynch is joined by the flow of the Woollens Brook after Bridgeways, the site of the former Lynch Mill, and then flows in an eastern direction under the Lea Valley Lines towards the former Lee Valley Caravan Park at Dobbs Weir. The Lynch then continues its journey in a southerly direction along a straightened channel, forming the western boundary of the caravan park, before joining the former original loop of the River Lea, which in turn becomes Broxbourne Mill Stream, by Dobbs Weir Lock.

== Public access ==
It is possible to walk alongside the Lynch by following a public footpath to Dobbs Weir, albeit much of it has been enclosed within the gardens of the houses along Bridgeways, a private and unadopted road in Hoddesdon. The Lynch is visible and can be heard as you walk along the path where it is joined by the Woollens Brook before passing under the railway lines.
