= Carthagena Lock =

Lock on the River Lee Navigation, England

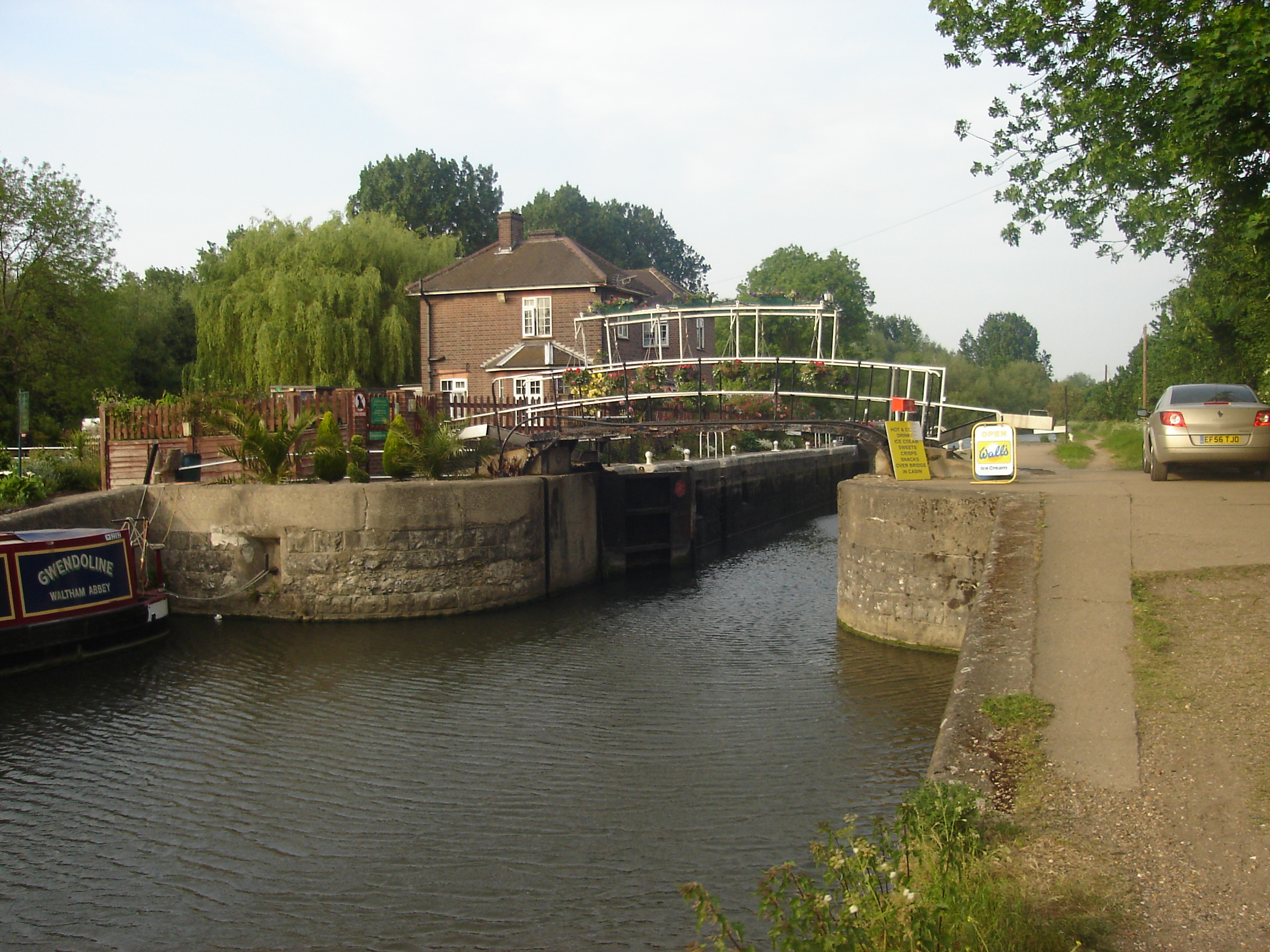
- Below the lock
- Interactive map of Carthagena Lock
- 51.743566°N 0.002108°W
- Waterway: River Lee Navigation
- County: Hertfordshire; Essex
- Maintained by: Canal & River Trust
- Operation: Manual
- Length: 85 feet (25.9 m)
- Width: 16 feet (4.9 m)
- Fall: 5 feet (1.5 m)
- Distance to Bow Creek: 17.5 miles (28.2 km)
- Distance to Hertford Castle Weir: 8.8 miles (14.2 km)

Carthagena Lock (No7) is a lock on the River Lee Navigation at Broxbourne, Hertfordshire, England.

Directly behind the lock is Carthagena Weir, part of a fishery which also includes two lakes and a section of the Old River Lea. To the east of the lock is the Nazeing Mead complex of lakes which incorporates part of the River Lee Flood Relief Channel.

Vehicular access is via the B194 Nazeing New Road. Pedestrian and cycle access is via the towpath which forms part of the Lea Valley Walk.

Next lock upstream	River Lee Navigation	Next lock downstream
Dobbs Weir Lock; 0.8 mile	Carthagena Lock; Grid reference: TL3791806924	Aqueduct Lock; 2.0 miles
