= Feildes Weir Lock =

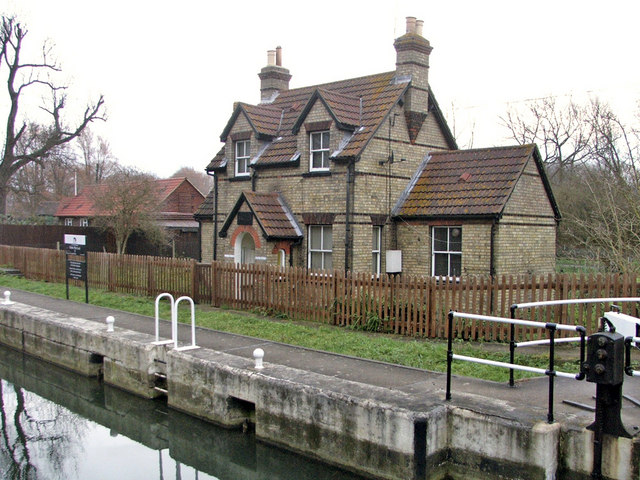
- The lock-keeper's cottage
- Interactive map of Feildes Weir Lock
- 51.763574°N 0.012998°E
- Waterway: River Lee Navigation
- County: Hertfordshire
- Maintained by: Canal & River Trust
- Operation: Manual
- Length: 85 feet (25.9 m)
- Width: 16 feet (4.9 m)
- Fall: 5 feet (1.5 m)
- Distance to Bow Creek: 19 miles (30.6 km)
- Distance to Hertford Castle Weir: 7.3 miles (11.7 km)

Feildes Weir Lock (No5) is a lock on the River Lee Navigation located in Hoddesdon.

== Location ==
The lock is adjacent to the confluence of the River Lea and the River Stort at Feildes Weir.

The 120-acre (0.49 km^{2}) Glen Faba lake is to the east of the lock.

== Public access ==
Vehicular access via Rattys Lane

Walking and cycle access via the towpath that forms part of the Lea Valley Walk

== Public transport ==
Rye House railway station

Next lock upstream	River Lee Navigation	Next lock downstream
Stanstead Lock; 2.5 miles	Feildes Weir Lock; Grid reference: TL3890009177	Dobbs Weir Lock; 0.7 mile
