= Dobbs Weir Lock =

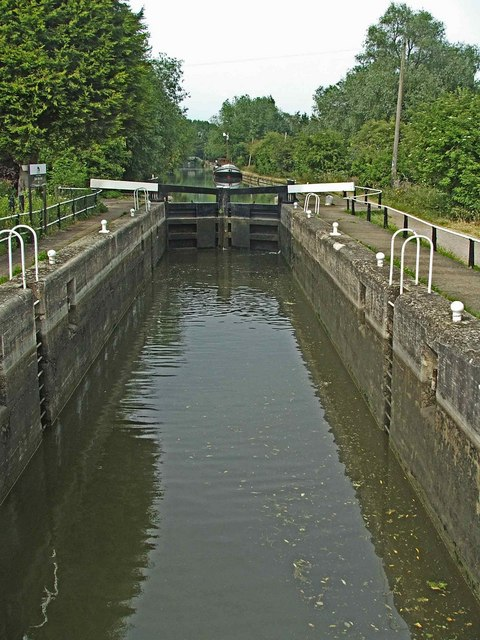
- Looking north
- Interactive map of Dobbs Weir Lock
- 51.752395°N 0.003307°E
- Waterway: River Lee Navigation
- County: Hertfordshire; Essex
- Maintained by: Canal & River Trust
- Operation: Manual
- Length: 85 feet (25.9 m)
- Width: 16 feet (4.9 m)
- Fall: 5 feet 1 inch (1.5 m)
- Distance to Bow Creek: 18.3 miles (29.5 km)
- Distance to Hertford Castle Weir: 8.0 miles (12.9 km)

Dobbs Weir Lock (No 6) is a lock on the River Lee Navigation near Hoddesdon.

== Location ==
The lock is south of the nearby Dobbs Weir, and stands close to the confluence of the Lynch Brook and the Old River Lea. To the east of the lock is the Nazeing Mead complex of lakes which incorporates part of the River Lee Flood Relief Channel.

== Public access ==
Vehicular access via Meadgate Road from Carthagena Lock.

Walking and cycle access along the towpath that forms part of the Lea Valley Walk.

== Public transport ==
Broxbourne railway station

Next lock upstream	River Lee Navigation	Next lock downstream
Feildes Weir Lock; 0.7 mile	Dobbs Weir Lock; Grid reference: TL3826507916	Carthagena Lock; 0.8mile
