= Woollens Brook =

Stream in Hertfordshire, England

Coordinates: 51.7662°N 0.0228°W

Course of the Woollens Brook

The Woollens Brook is a minor tributary of the River Lea which flows through Hoddesdon in Hertfordshire, England.

The Woollens Brook rises close to Ermine Street, south of Hertford Heath and flows through Box Wood. The stream flows under both the A10 and the Dinant Link Road roundabout with Amwell Street. The stream then runs parallel with Essex Road before going under it and through the Lampits where it joins another minor tributary of the River Lea, the River Lynch, at Bridgeways.
