= Cheshunt Lock =

Lock on the Lee Navigation, England

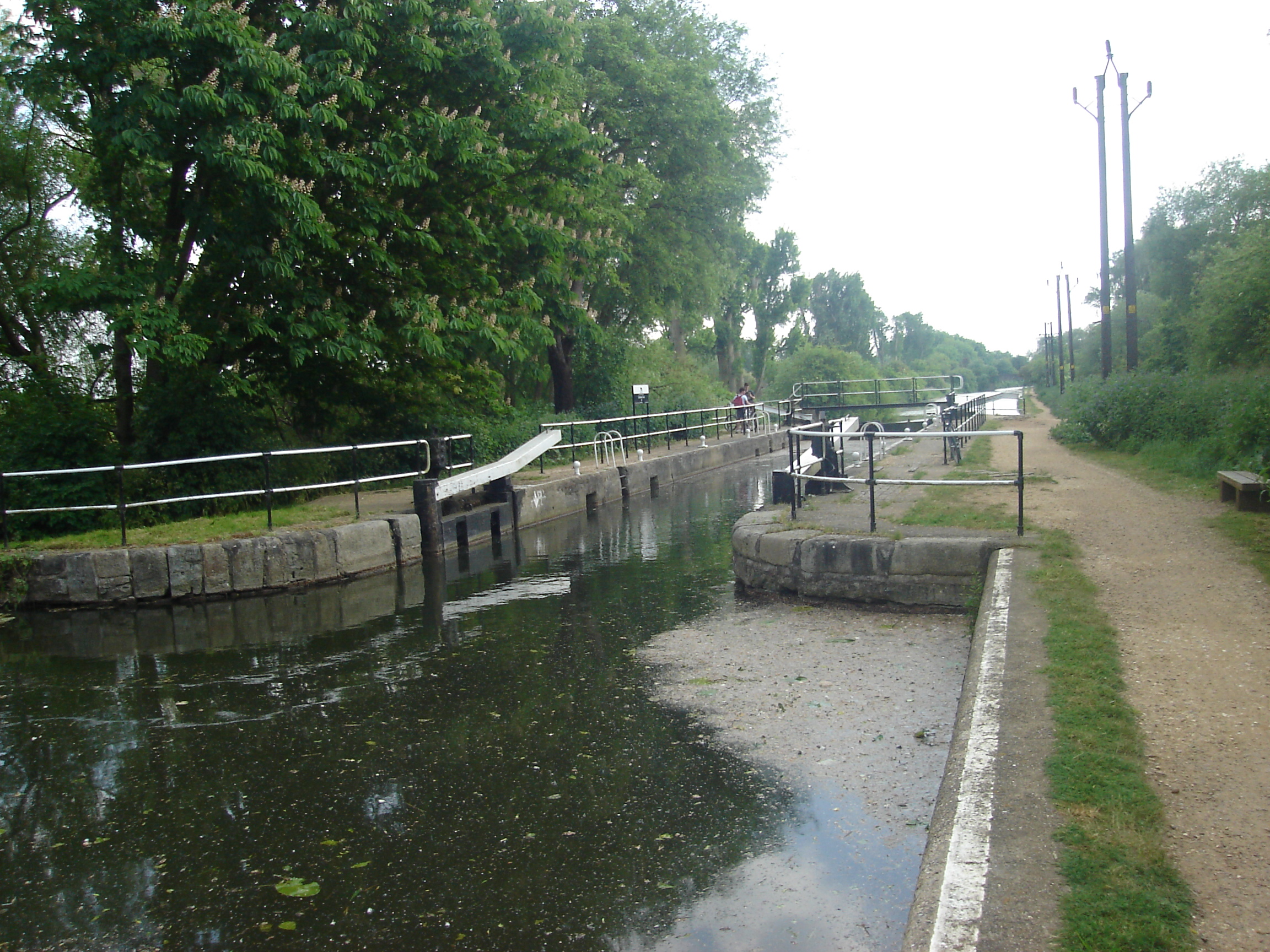
- Interactive map of Cheshunt Lock
- 51.710046°N 0.016882°W
- Waterway: River Lee Navigation
- County: Hertfordshire
- Maintained by: Canal & River Trust
- Operation: Manual
- Length: 85 feet (25.9 m)
- Width: 16 feet (4.9 m)
- Fall: 5 feet 1 inch (1.5 m)
- Distance to Bow Creek: 14.5 miles (23.3 km)
- Distance to Hertford Castle Weir: 11.8 miles (19.0 km)

Cheshunt Lock (No 9) is a lock on the River Lee Navigation at Cheshunt, Hertfordshire, for which it is named. Unlike some other locks on the River Lee, it has not, in turn, given its name to more local the surrounding area.

== Geography ==
The lock is located in the River Lee Country Park which is a part of the Lee Valley Park. The Seventy Acres Lake to the east is an important site for the bittern. To the west is North Met Pit, a mature gravel pit of 58 acres divided into two. It is another former gravel pit which is popular with anglers and naturalists.

== Public access ==
Pedestrian and cycle access by the towpath which is part of the Lea Valley Walk.

== Public transport ==
The nearest station is Cheshunt railway station.

== Navigation ==
Next lock upstream	River Lee Navigation	Next lock downstream
Aqueduct Lock; 1.0 mile	Cheshunt Lock; Grid reference: TL3700003169	Waltham Common Lock; 1.0 mile

== See also ==
- Enfield Lock
