= Aqueduct Lock =

Lock on the River Lee Navigation, England

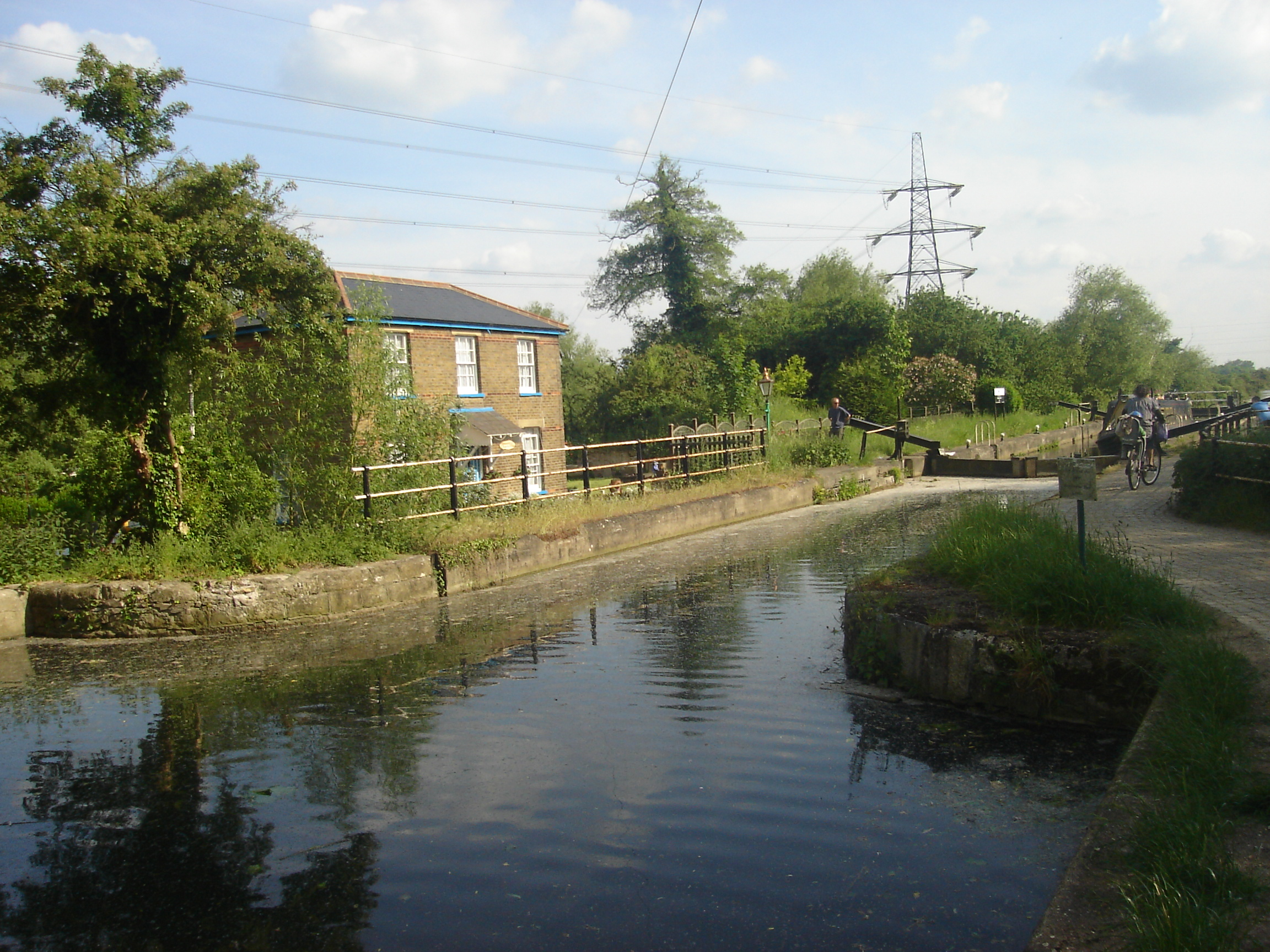
- Looking south, the lock and the lock-keeper's cottage
- Interactive map of Aqueduct Lock
- 51.721937°N 0.014299°W
- Waterway: River Lee Navigation
- County: Hertfordshire; Essex
- Maintained by: Canal & River Trust
- Operation: Manual
- Length: 85 feet (25.9 m)
- Width: 16 feet (4.9 m)
- Fall: 5 feet 6 inches (1.7 m)
- Distance to Bow Creek: 15.5 miles (24.9 km)
- Distance to Hertford Castle Weir: 10.8 miles (17.4 km)

Aqueduct Lock (Number 8) is a lock on the River Lee Navigation close to Turnford.

== Location ==
The lock is located in the River Lee Country Park and is adjacent to the Old River Lea and the 180-acre (0.73 km^{2}) Holyfield Lake which incorporates part of the River Lee Flood Relief Channel

The aqueduct above the lock carries the Small River Lea under the Navigation, which flows from the nearby Old River Lea.

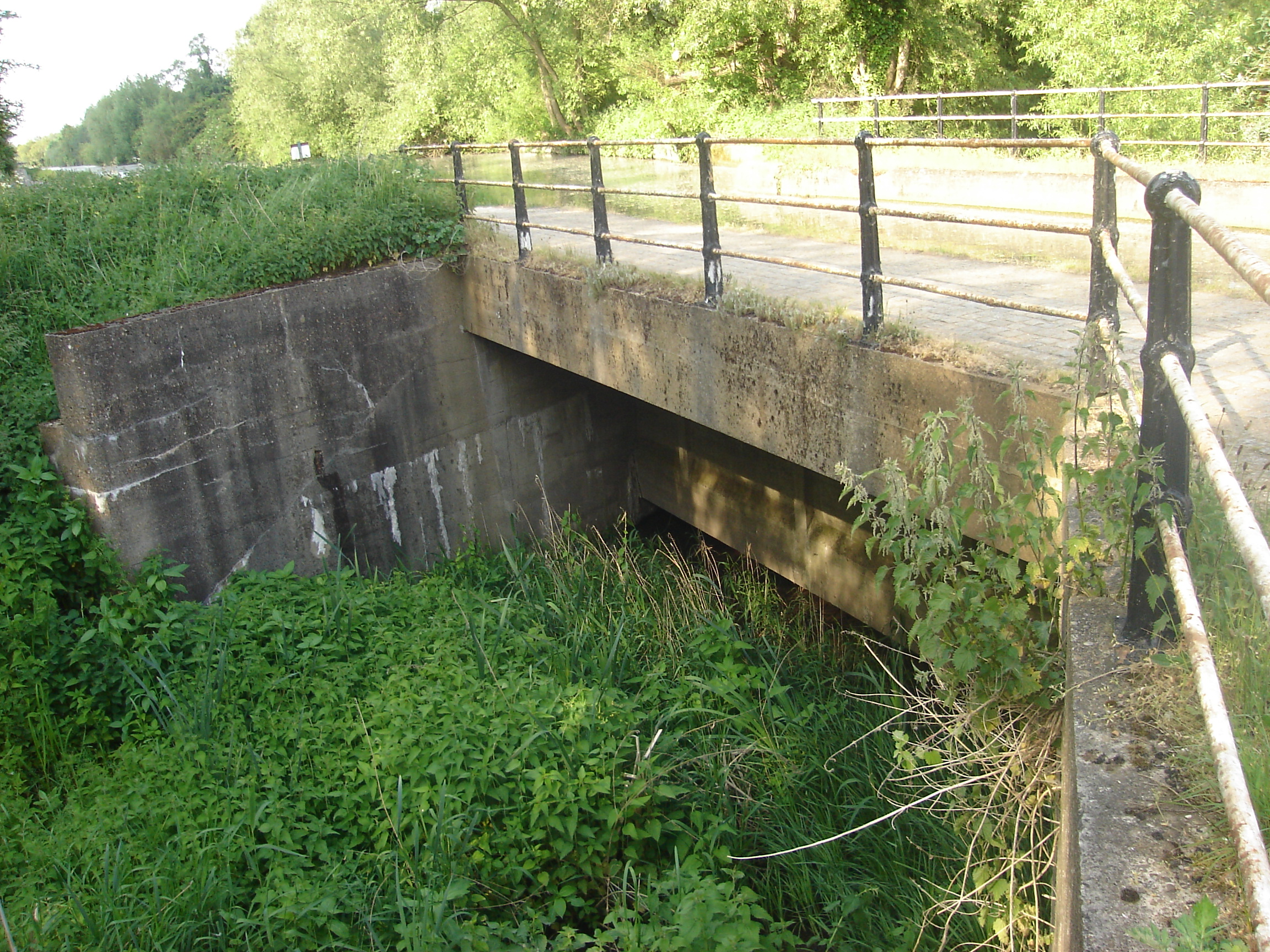
The aqueduct

== Public access ==
Vehicular access at Wharf Road, Wormley car park.

Pedestrian and cycles via the towpath which forms part of the Lea Valley Walk.

== Public transport ==
- Broxbourne railway station
- Cheshunt railway station
- Bus timetables

Next lock upstream	River Lee Navigation	Next lock downstream
Carthagena Lock; 2 miles	Aqueduct Lock; Grid reference: TL3714204496	Cheshunt Lock; 1 mile
