= Broxbourne Mill Stream =

Stream in Hertfordshire, England

Coordinates: 51.7433°N 0.0142°W

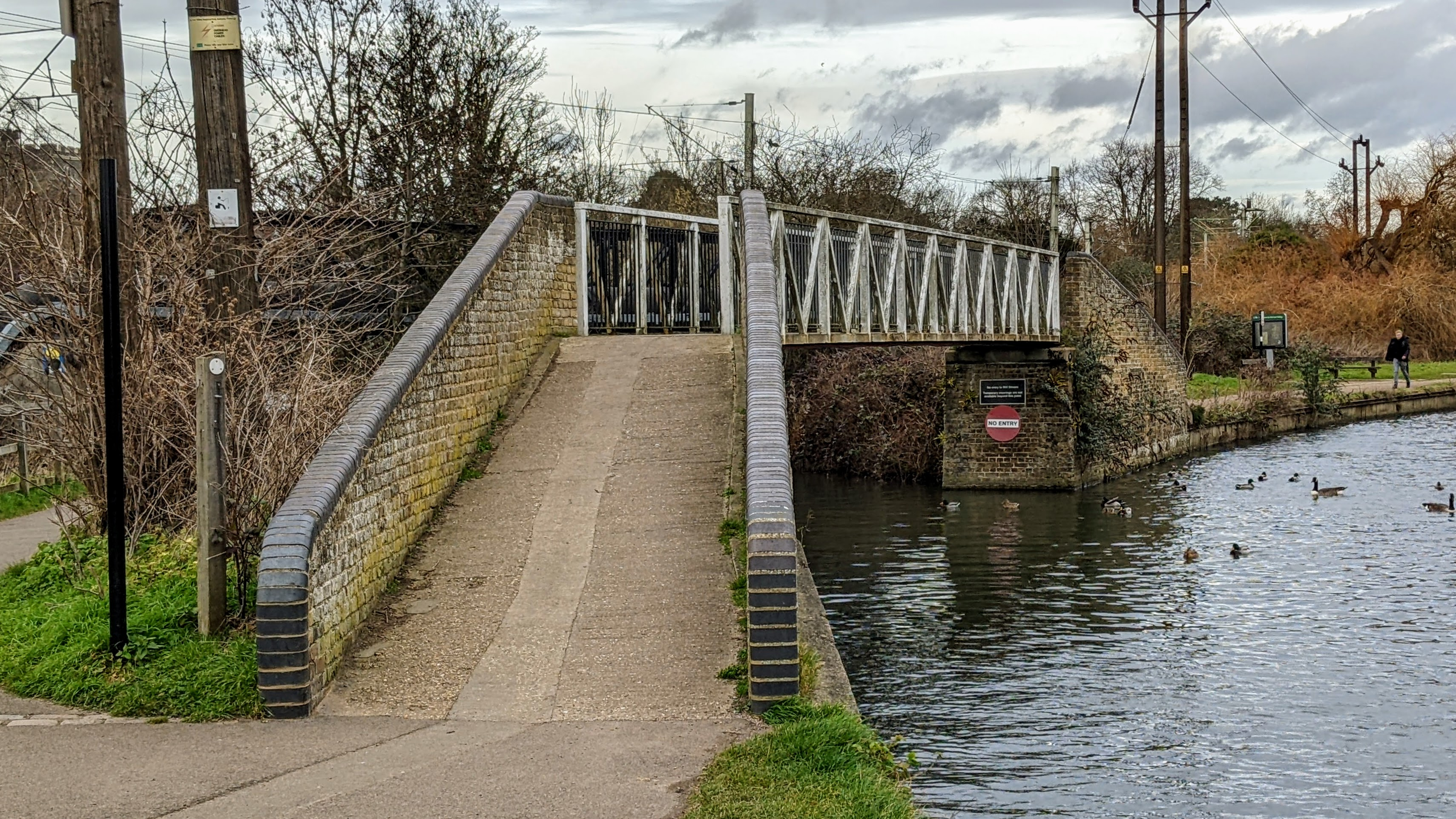
Bridge over the Broxbourne Mill Stream where it rejoins the River Lea

The Broxbourne Mill Stream which diverges from the River Lee Navigation just south of Dobbs Weir, is one of the few remaining 'old river' loops of the River Lea, with a relatively natural channel form and a diverse range of habitats. Broxbourne developed as a small settlement for milling at a river crossing point at Broxbourne Mill. Spital Brook empties into the Mill Stream by Nazeing New Road.
