= Britannia Stop Lock =

Former lock on the Limehouse Cut in Tower Hamlets, London

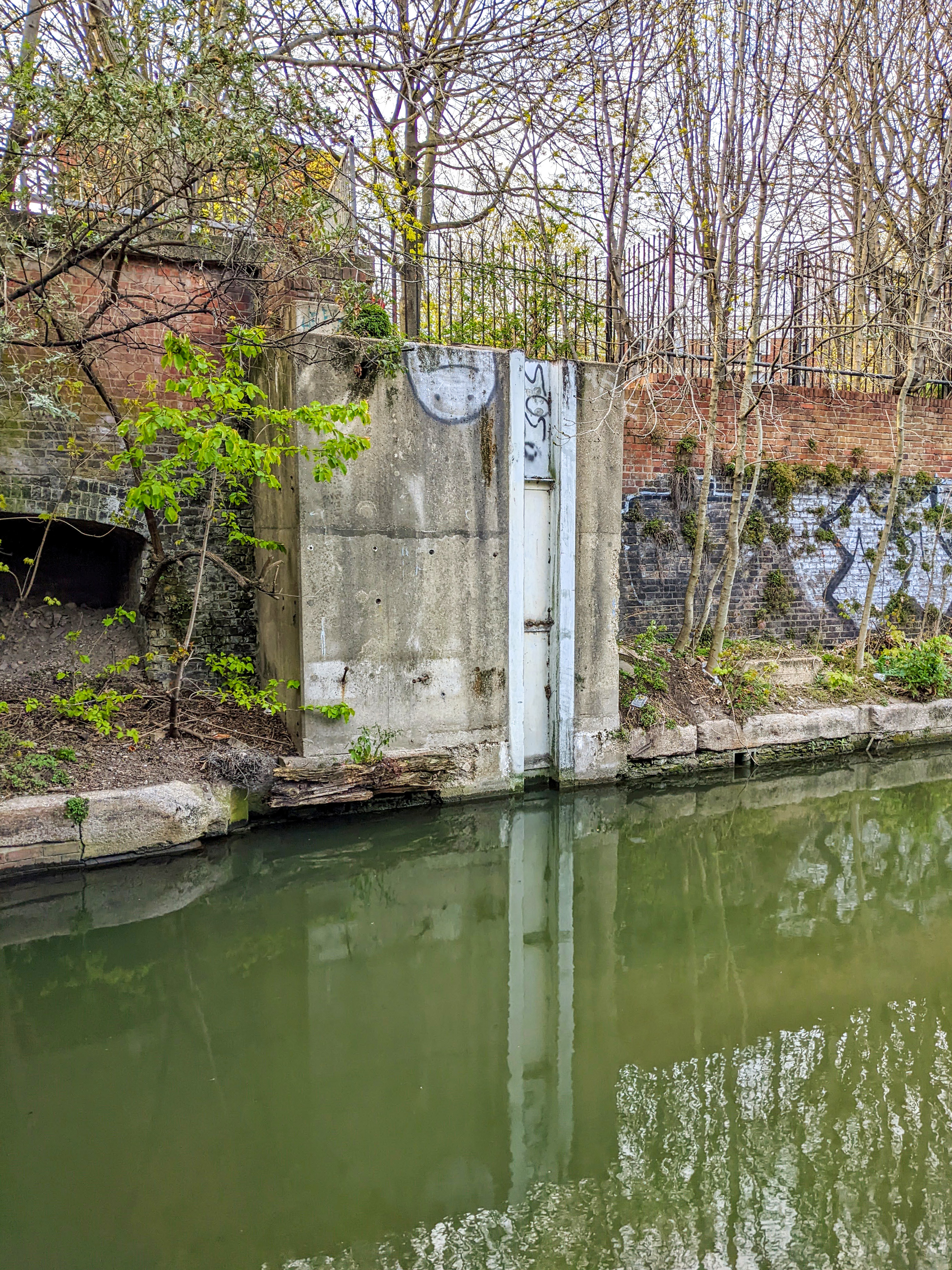
- Remnants of the lock gate in 2022
- Interactive map of Britannia Stop Lock
- 51.51235°N 0.0318°W
- Waterway: Limehouse Cut
- County: Tower Hamlets; Greater London
- Maintained by: N/A
- Operation: Redundant
- Fall: Stop lock
- Distance to Old Ford Lock: 1.9 miles (3.1 km)
- Distance to Limehouse Basin: 0.1 miles (0.2 km)

Britannia Stop Lock was a lock on the Limehouse Cut in the London Borough of Tower Hamlets. It was built in 1853. The gates were either side of Commercial Road bridge and were oriented such that a boat travelling from south-west to north-east would ascend in height.

From 1 January 1854, the Regents Canal took control of Limehouse Cut and built a connecting link into the Regents Canal Dock, now called Limehouse Basin. At the same time, a third set of gates was added to Britannia Lock. These faced the other way to the existing gates and were installed to cope with the situation where the level in the dock was higher than that of Limehouse Cut.

The link was short-lived and in May 1864, it was filled in. A report in 1893 noted that there was no evidence that the third set of gates at Britannia Lock had ever been used, that they had been removed around 1868 and that the other gates had also been removed because they were useless. Following the takeover of the canal by British Waterways in 1948, a vertical guillotine gate was fitted on the north side of Commercial Road bridge but this was removed in the 1990s.

== Public access ==
Pedestrian and cycle access via the towpath that forms part of the Lea Valley Walk.

== Public transport ==
The nearest Docklands Light Railway station is Limehouse.
