= Feildes Weir =

Weir on the River Lea in Hertfordshire, England

Coordinates: 51.764055°N 0.014001°E

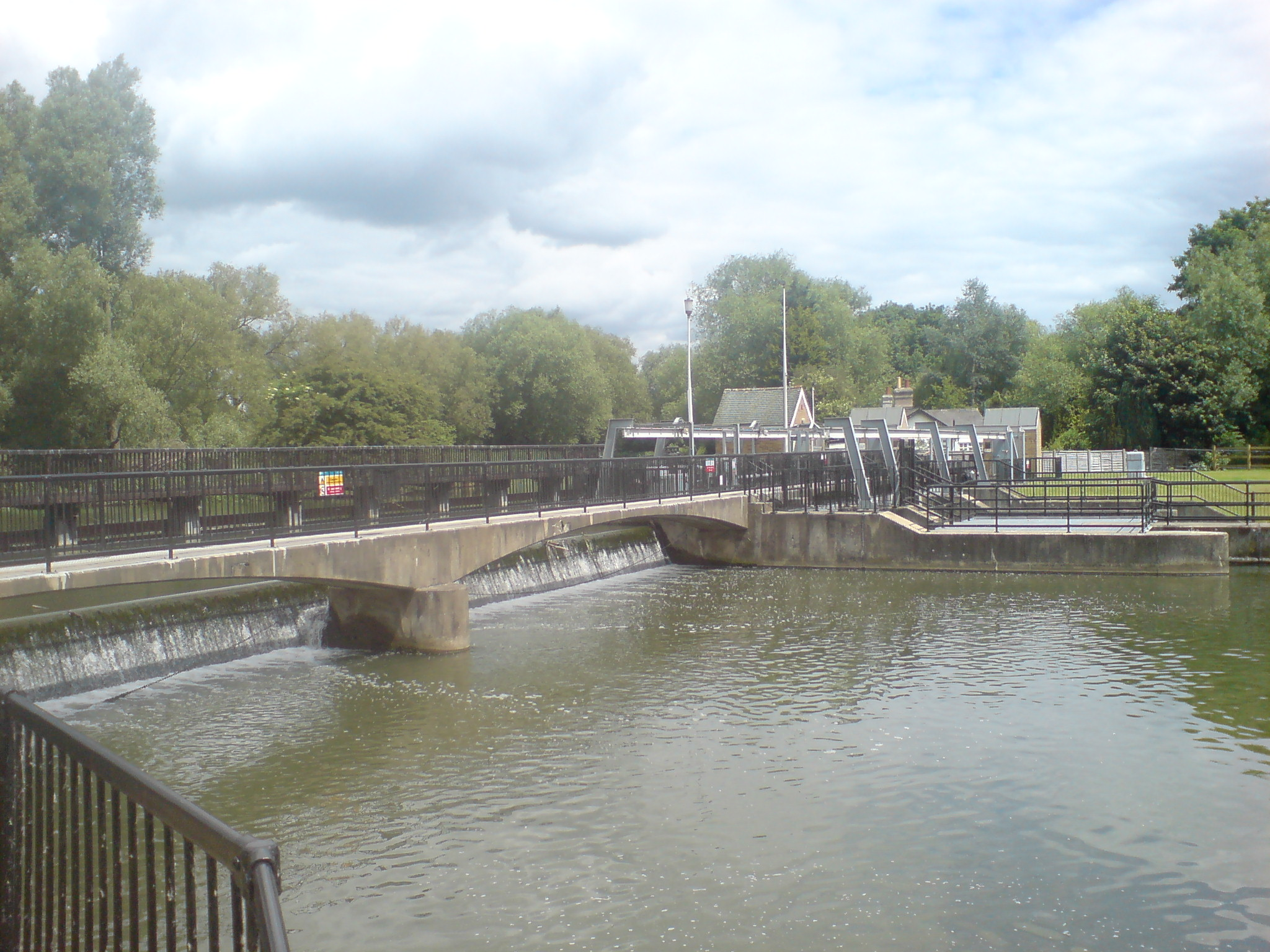
Main weir drop

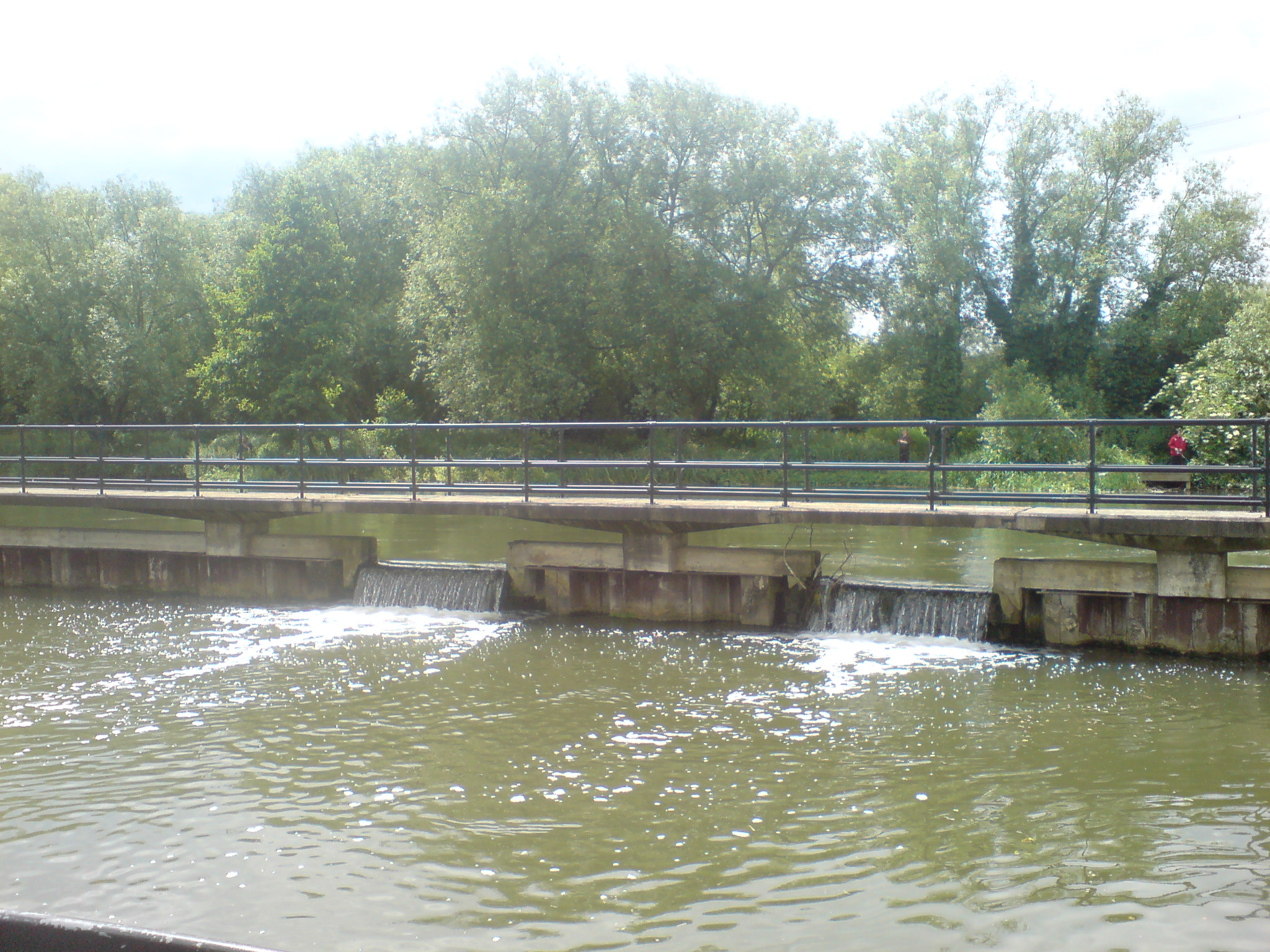
Side drops

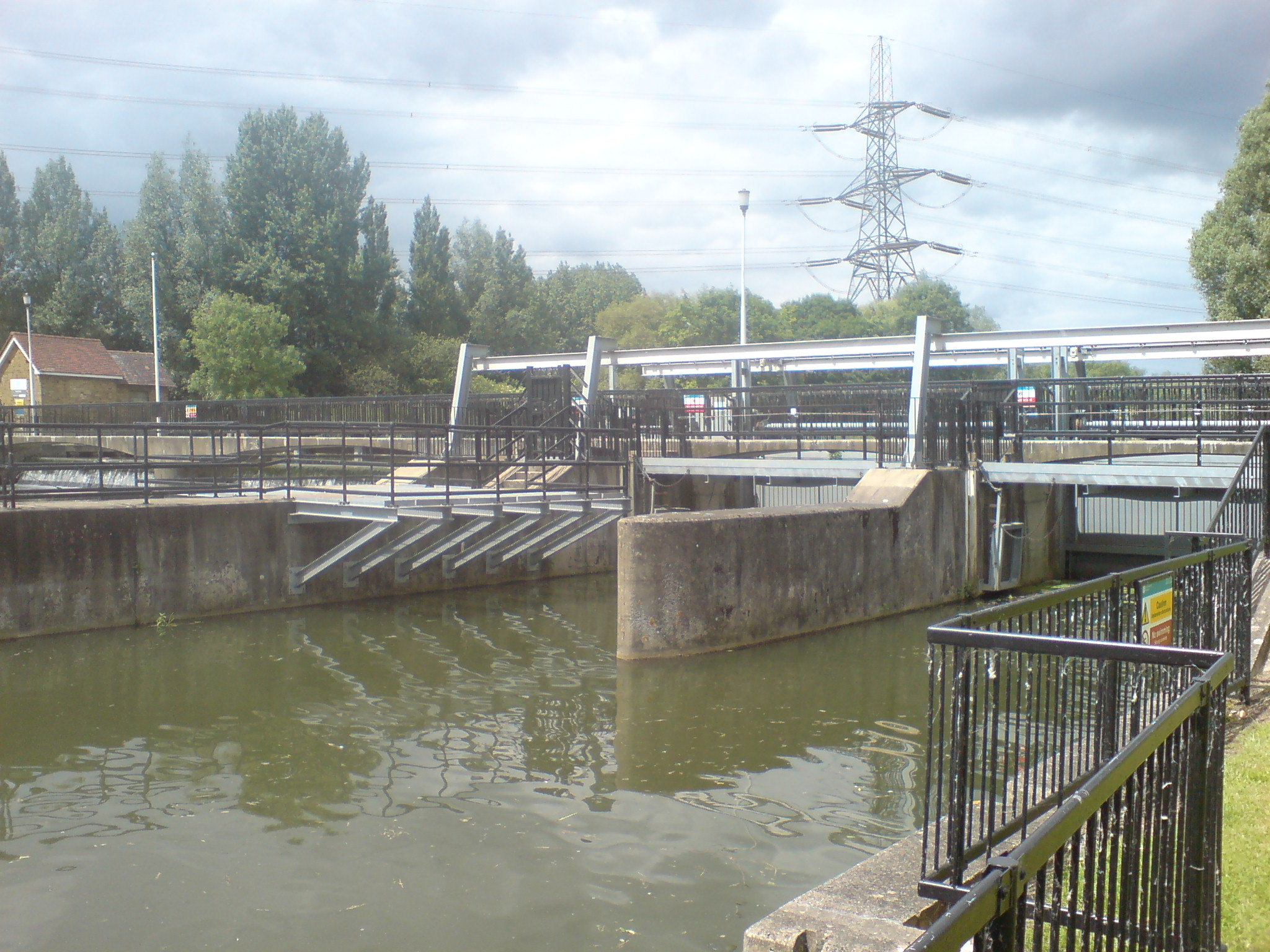
Flood channel

Feildes Weir is a weir on the River Lea located in Hoddesdon, Hertfordshire at the confluence of the River Lea and River Stort. The weir marks the start of the Lower Lee. A channel of the man-made River Lee Flood Relief Channel is incorporated into the weir.

== History ==
The weir has had a complex history of changes to channel control and bypassing over the years. Control was originally exercised by a barrage of gates and sluices.

In 1976, a 29 metres (95 ft) wide thin-plate weir was installed, with three vertical-lift sluices controlling a parallel flood relief channel. Flows average about 4.4 m3/s discharge over the weir; higher flows enter the flood channel.

== Angling ==
Angling in the weir pool is controlled by the Ware Angling Club and the River Lea Angling Club.

== Access ==
=== Road ===
- From Hoddesdon via A10 road, A1170 road to Dinant Link Road to Rattys Lane.
- From Nazeing via Dobbs Weir Road.

=== Rail ===
- Rye House railway station.

=== Other ===
- Pedestrian and cycling access via Lea Valley Walk.
