= Hertford Lock =

Lock on the River Lea

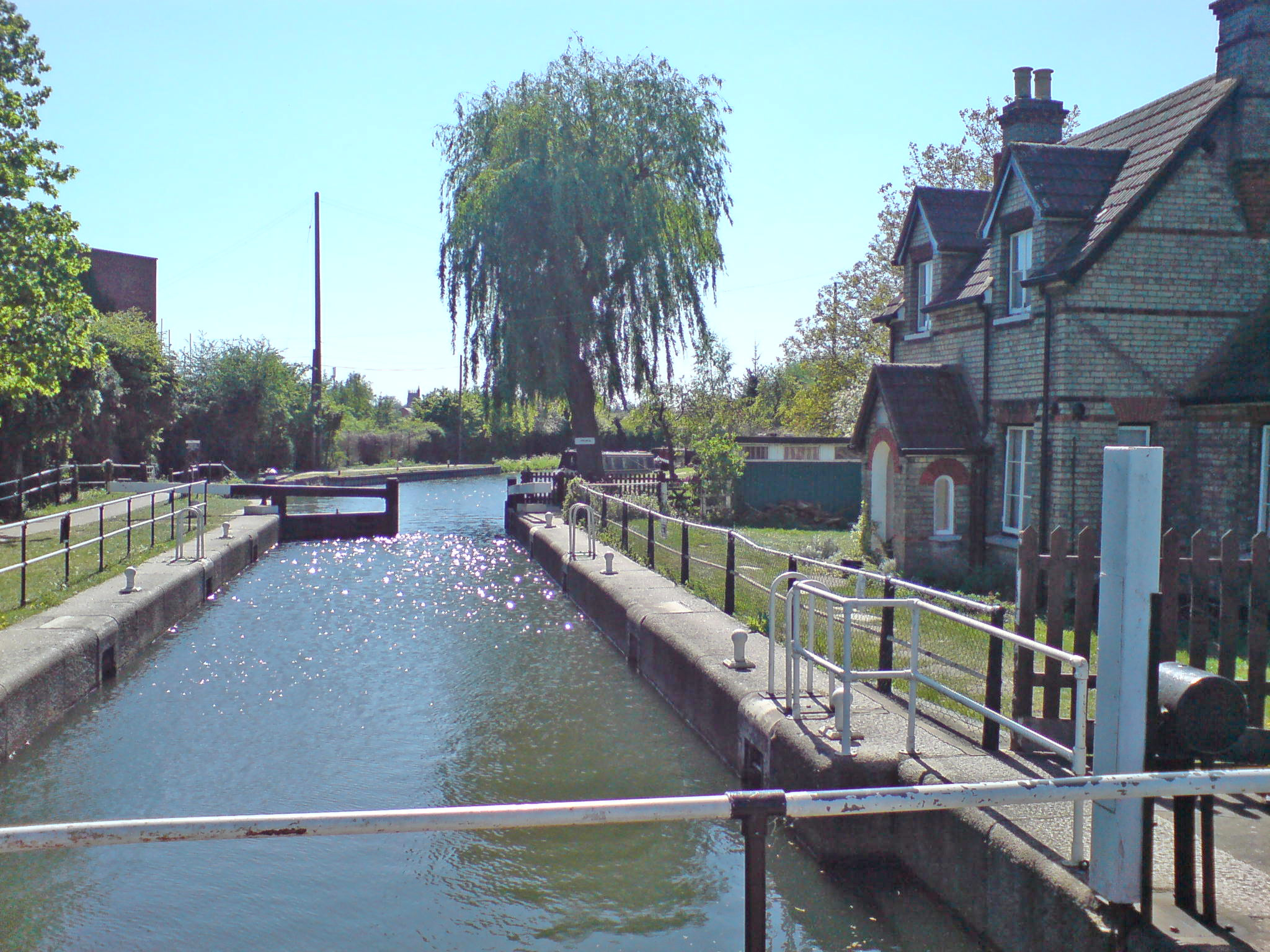
- The lock and lock-keeper's cottage
- Interactive map of Hertford Lock
- 51.803799°N 0.066739°W
- Waterway: River Lee Navigation
- County: Hertfordshire
- Maintained by: Canal & River Trust
- Operation: Manual
- Length: 85 feet (25.9 m)
- Width: 16 feet (4.9 m)
- Fall: 7 feet 11 inches (2.4 m)
- Distance to Bow Creek: 26.3 miles (42.3 km)
- Distance to Hertford Castle Weir: 0.8 miles (1.3 km)

Hertford Lock (No1) is a lock situated on the River Lea on the eastern side of Hartham Common, Hertford in the English county of Hertfordshire. It is owned and managed by Canal & River Trust and is the first lock of the River Lee Navigation.

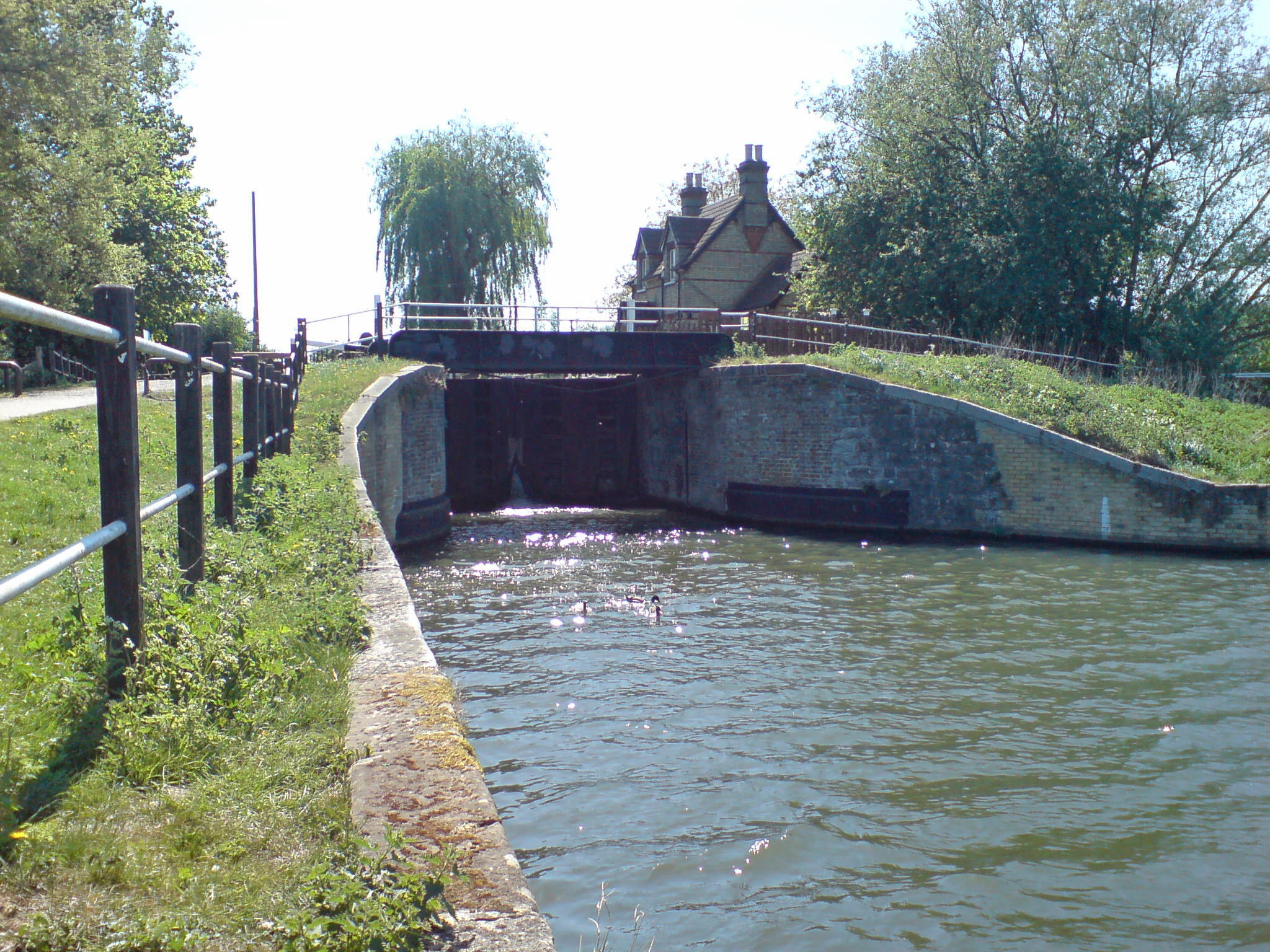
Lower end of lock, and main gates

== Public access ==
The lock is located on the River Lee Navigation towpath which forms part of the Lea Valley Walk

== Public transport ==
Hertford East railway station

Next lock upstream	River Lee Navigation	Next lock downstream
None	Hertford Lock; Grid reference: TL3328013501	Ware Lock; 0.5 mile
