= Ware Lock =

Canal lock in Hertfordshire, England

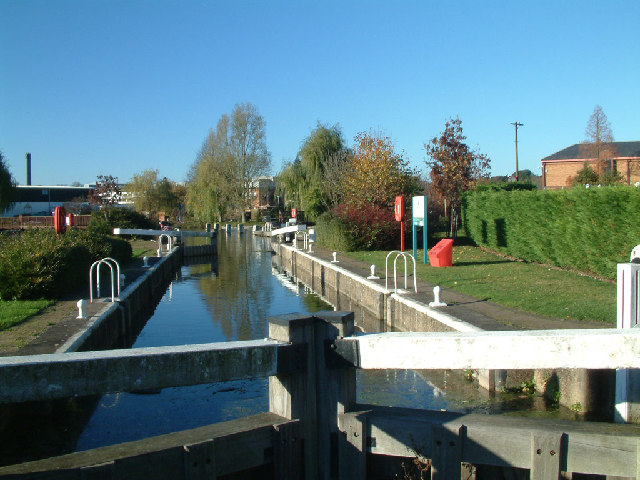
- Ware Lock
- Interactive map of Ware Lock
- 51°48′39″N 0°02′28″W
- Waterway: River Lee Navigation
- County: Hertfordshire
- Maintained by: Environment Agency
- Operation: Manual
- First built: 1855
- Length: 85 feet (25.9 m)
- Width: 16 feet (4.9 m)
- Fall: 7 feet 6 inches (2.3 m)
- Distance to Bow Creek: 25 miles (40 km)
- Distance to Hertford Castle Weir: 1.3 miles (2.1 km)

Ware Lock (No2) is a lock on the River Lee Navigation at Ware. The lock stands adjacent to Ware Weir and is the only lock on the Navigation to be operated and maintained by the Environment Agency.

== Public access ==
The lock stands on the River Lee Navigation towpath which forms part of the Lea Valley Walk.

Unlike most of the locks on the Lea, when travelling upstream, the temporary mooring before entering the lock is on the right-hand (starboard) side of the river, as is the mooring on leaving the lock.

== Public transport ==
- Ware railway station

Next lock upstream	River Lee Navigation	Next lock downstream
Hertford Lock; 0.5 mile	Ware Lock; Grid reference: TL3502914331	Hardmead Lock; 2.5 miles
