= Bromley Stop Lock =

Lock on the River Lee Navigation, England

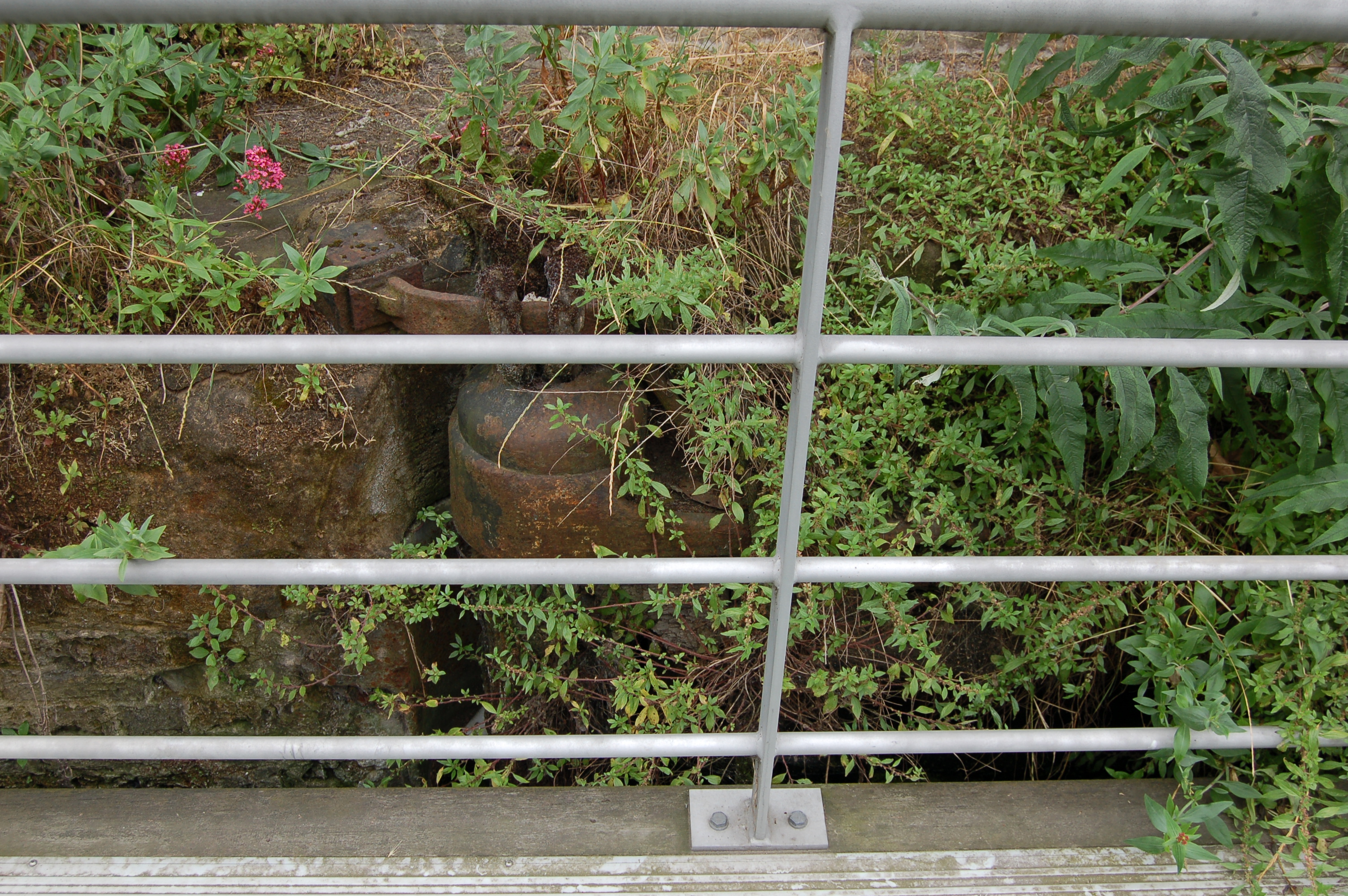
- The remains of the Bromley Stop Lock, can be seen amongst the weeds in the bank beyond the 'floating' towpath.
- 51.521857°N 0.009832°W
- Waterway: Limehouse Cut
- County: Tower Hamlets; Greater London
- Maintained by: N/A
- Operation: Redundant
- Fall: Stop lock
- Distance to Old Ford Lock: 0.25 miles (0.4 km)
- Distance to Limehouse Basin: 1.75 miles (2.8 km)

Bromley Stop Lock was a lock on the Limehouse Cut in the London Borough of Tower Hamlets that was situated near the junction of Limehouse Cut and the River Lee Navigation by Bow Locks.

Stop locks were initially installed where there was a change of canal ownership to prevent the loss of water from one canal to another. Bow Locks were originally tidal, i.e. not a falling lock. They would be opened at high tide to fill the Limehouse Cut and to maintain navigation in the River Lee Navigation. This lock could be closed should anything go wrong with the process to maintain the level of the Cut, at the level in Limehouse Basin.

Today, the lock is redundant and very little of it remains. One gate at the lower end of the lock is visible within a patch of weeds behind the modern floating tow-path.

== Public access ==
Pedestrian and cycle access via the towpath which forms part of the Lea Valley Walk

== Public transport ==
The nearest Docklands Light Railway station is Devons Road.
