= Stanborough Reedmarsh =

Natural reserve in Hertfordshire

Coordinates: 51.8102°N 0.2172°W

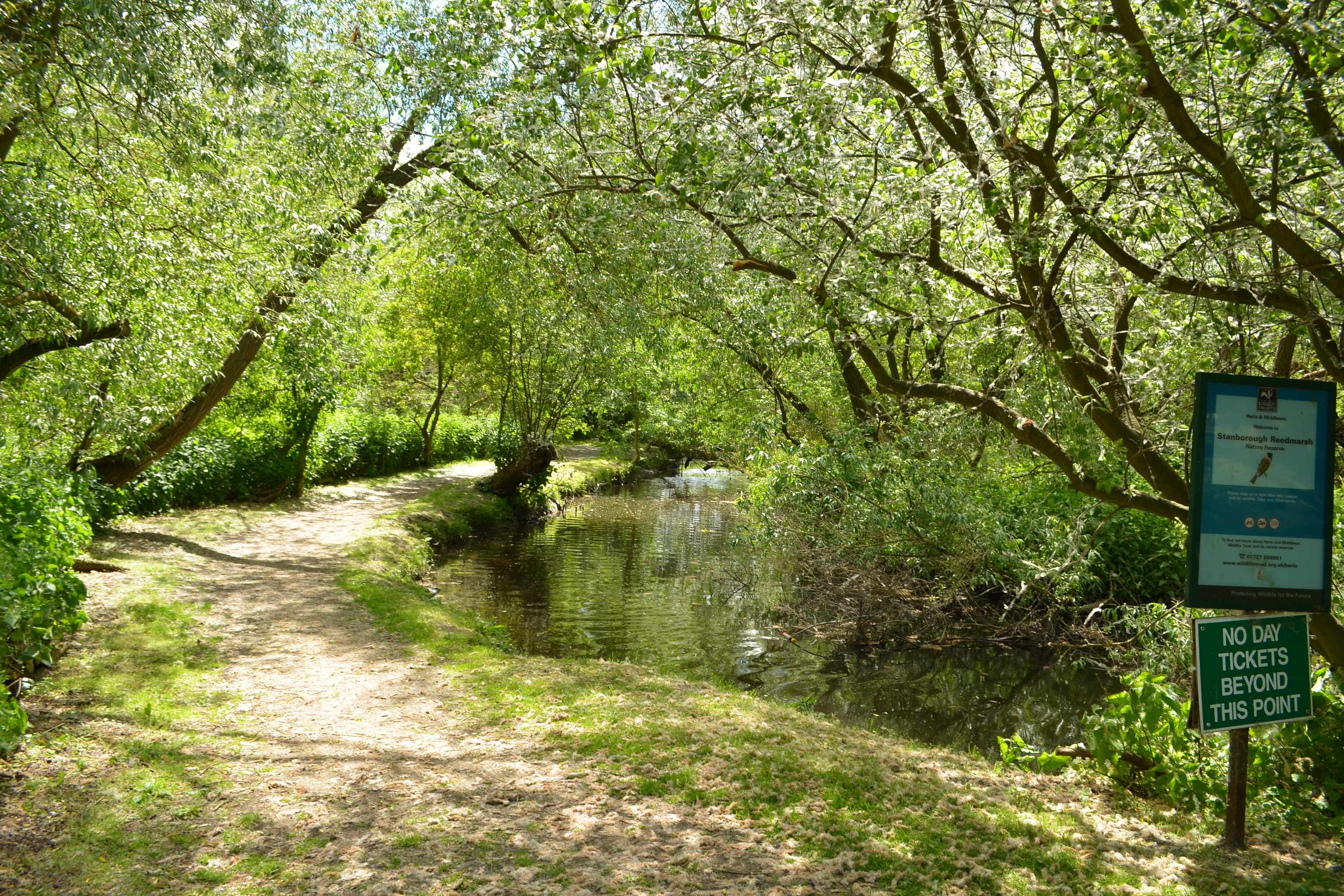
Entrance to Stanborough Reedmarsh in May 2017

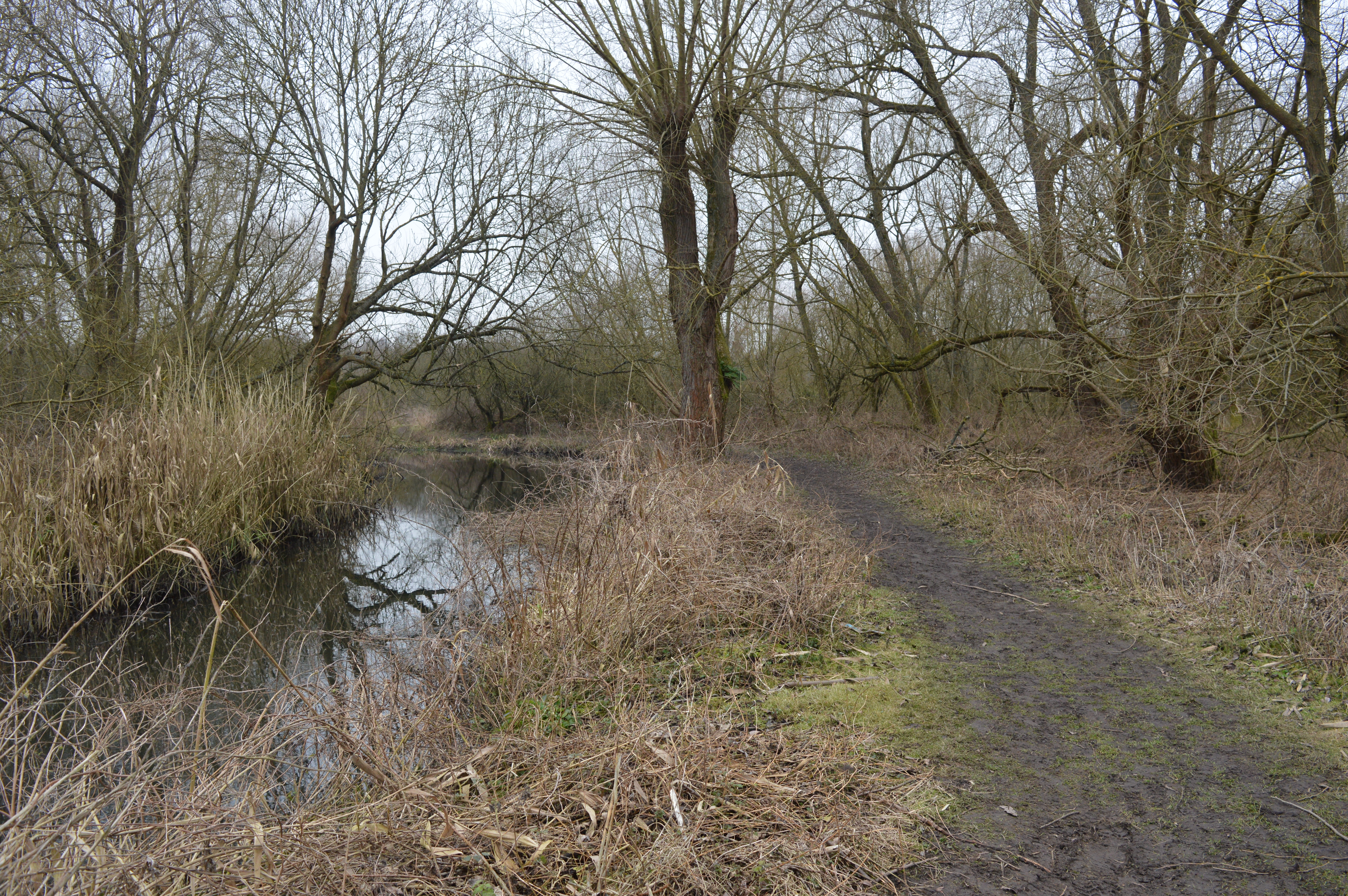
Stanborough Reedmarsh and the River Lea

Stanborough Reedmarsh is a 3.3 hectare Local Nature Reserve in Welwyn Garden City in Hertfordshire. It is owned by Welwyn Hatfield Borough Council and managed by the Herts and Middlesex Wildlife Trust.

The site is wet willow woodland on the bank of the River Lea. It is important for water voles and birds such as reed and sedge warblers. Water figwort, common meadow rue and water chickweed grow along the river bank.

There is access to the site from Stanborough Road through Stanborough Park.
