= Broxbourne Mill =

Coordinates: 51.743843°N 0.01429°W

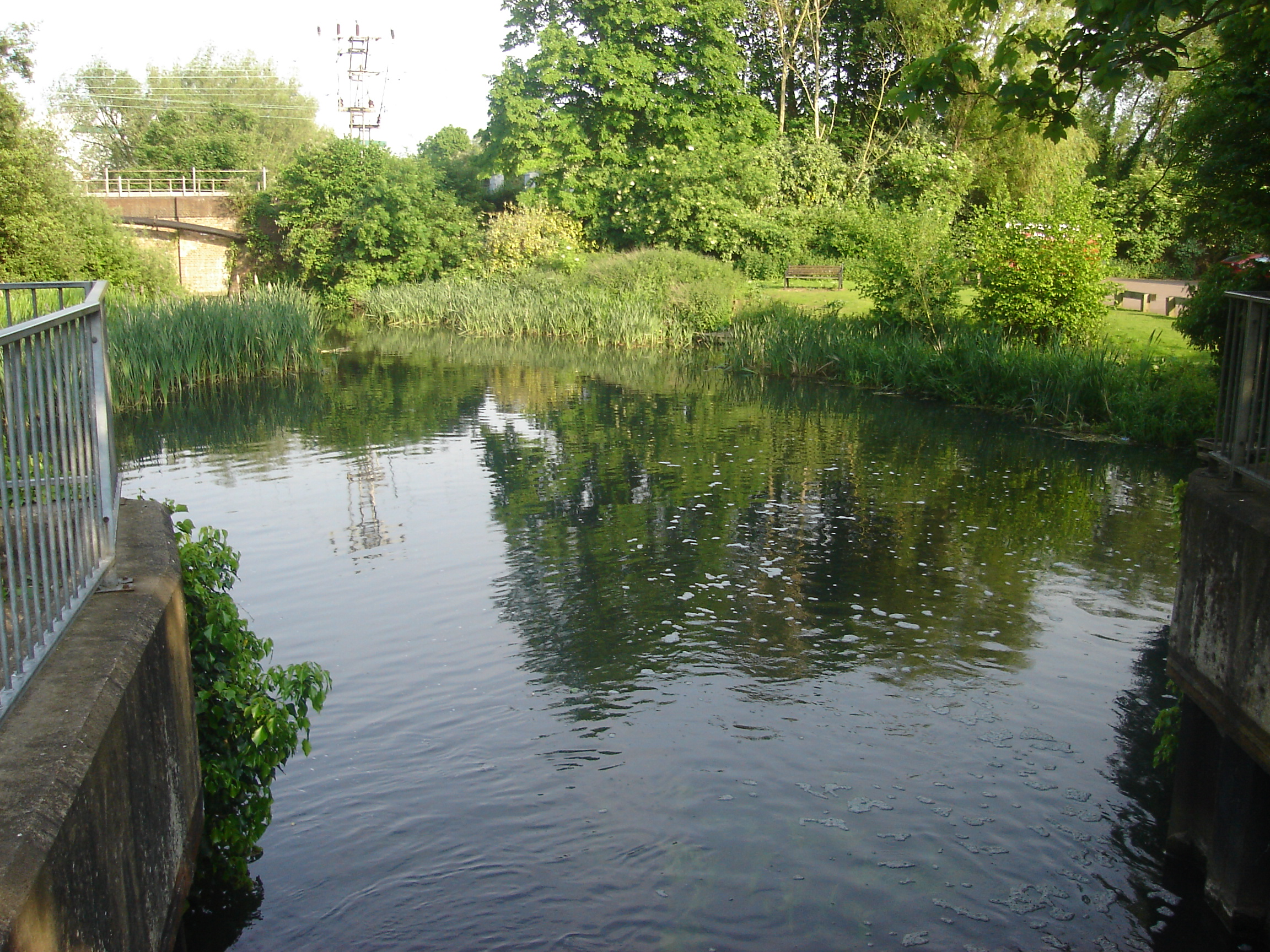
The millpool and stream. The West Anglia Main Line railway bridge is in background

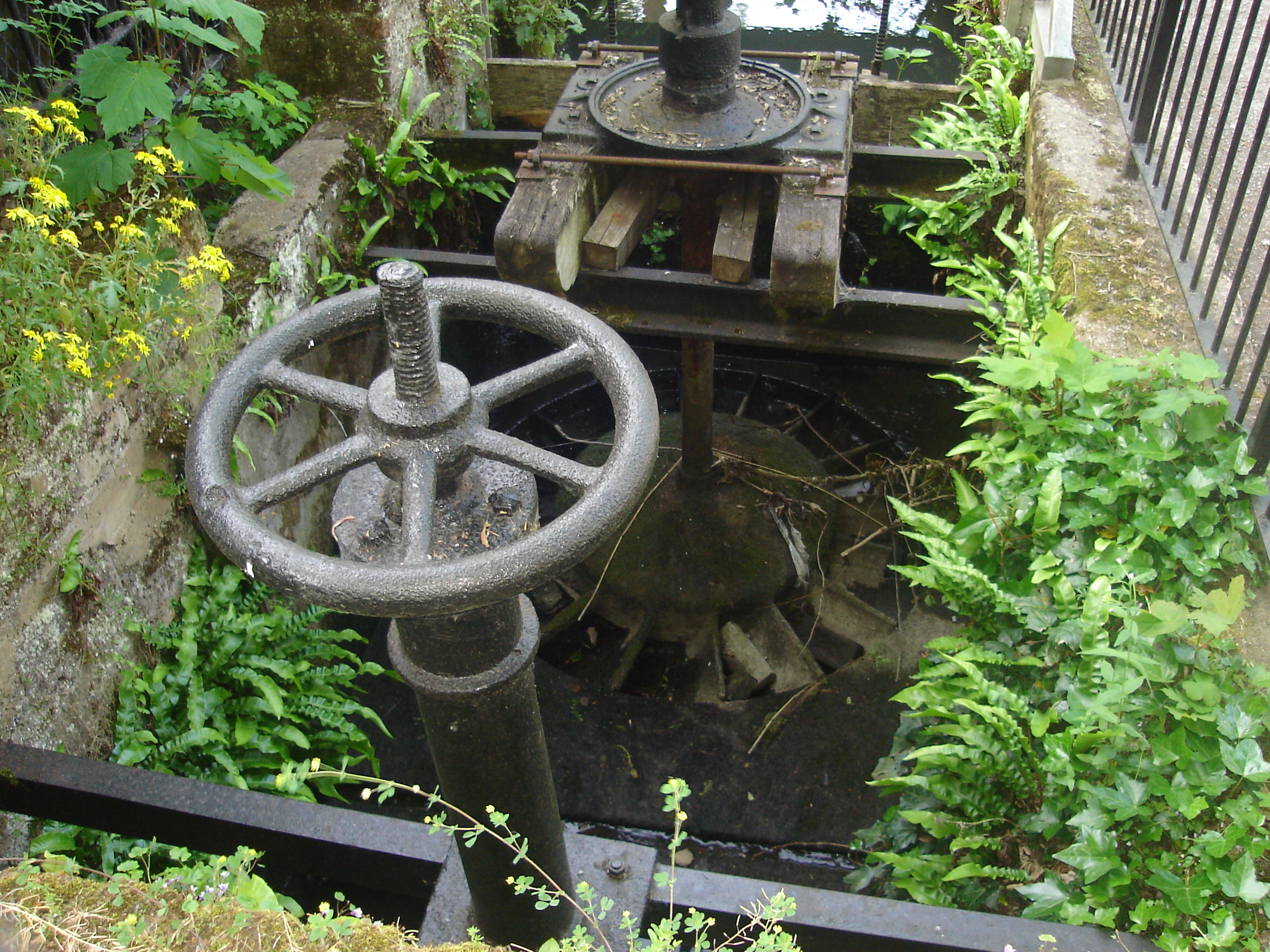
Mill machinery

Broxbourne Mill is located at the Old Mill and Meadows Site Lee Valley Park, Broxbourne, Hertfordshire.

== History ==
A mill stood here for 900 years before being destroyed by fire on 1 October 1949. It is the only mill in this area to be mentioned in the Domesday Book 1086. The first known owners were the Knights of St. John of Jerusalem who held the mill to 1544 at the time of the Reformation. The mill ceased the milling of grain in 1891 and was used for a variety of uses until its destruction.

== Recent history ==
The remnants of the mill which were renovated by the Lee Valley Regional Park Authority in 1977 included c16 brickwork floor and window frames of the c19 two-storey miller's house. The original water wheel has been restored to include replacement paddles made from re-cycled plastic which have a longer life, weigh less therefore placing less stress on the original wheel. Additional work included a new side sluice which when raised allow excess water to pass through.

== Today ==
The mill and its surroundings which are open to the public are known as the Old Mill and Meadows site. The main bulk of which is wet meadows where water voles can be found. During the summer months dragonflies and damselflies are seen hovering over the reedbeds. The small piece of woodland provides habitat for birds and cover for small mammals such as the fox and the muntjac deer. Other activities here are angling which is permitted in the millpool and the millstream. Cycle hire is available in season and a model railway club is open to the public at certain times.

== Facilities ==
- Riverside holiday chalets
- Car Park
- Toilets
- Refreshments at certain times

== How to get there ==
Rail

- Broxbourne railway station is close by

Buses

- 310,311,C3

By road

- A10 to A1170 to B194 Towards Broxbourne Station 2nd Right Churchfields 1st Left Mill Lane.

By foot and cycle

- Lea Valley Walk
