= Stanborough Park =

Natural local park in Welwyn Garden City

Coordinates: 51°47′00″N 0°13′00″W

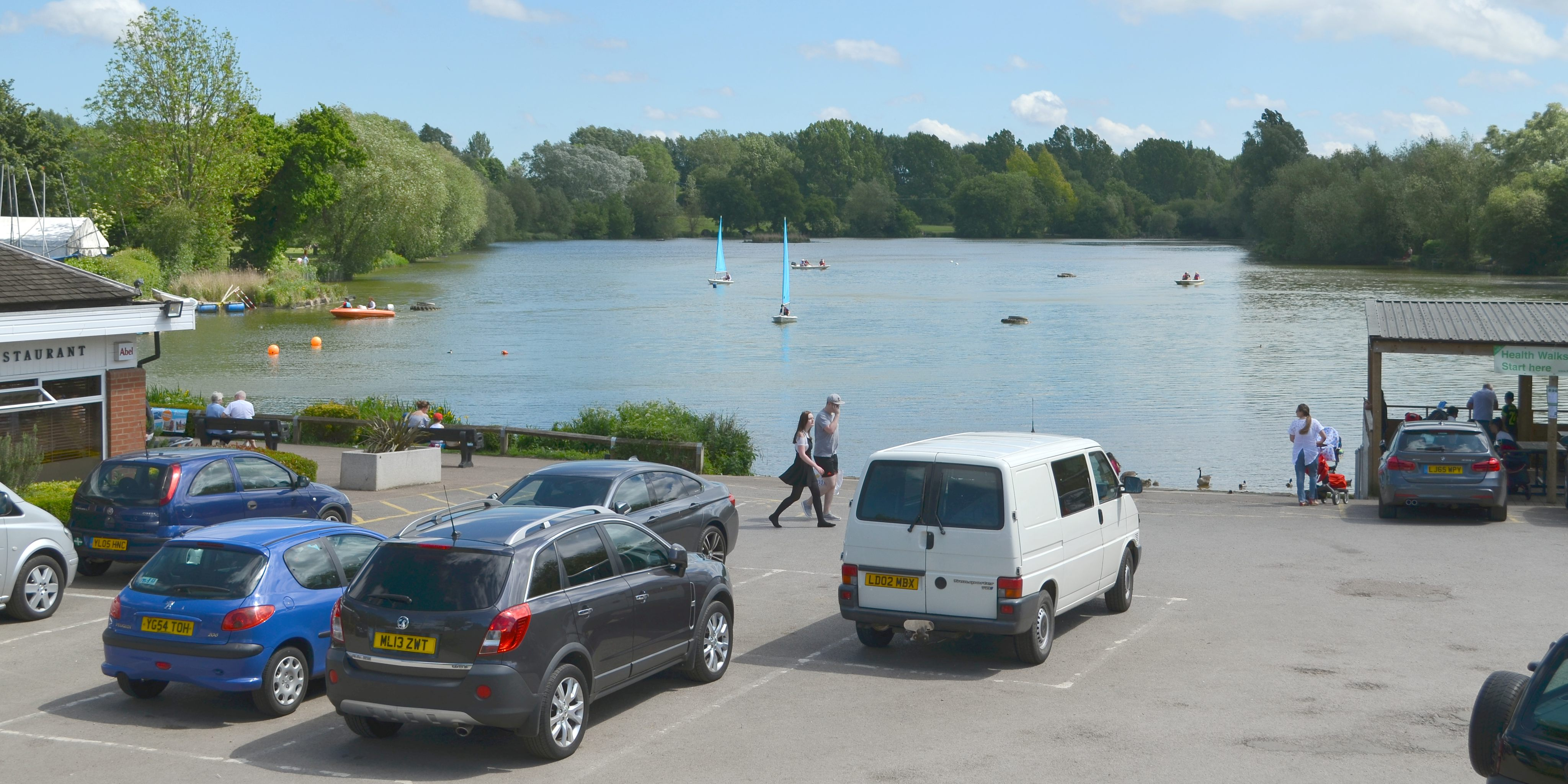
Stanborough Park, Southern Lake

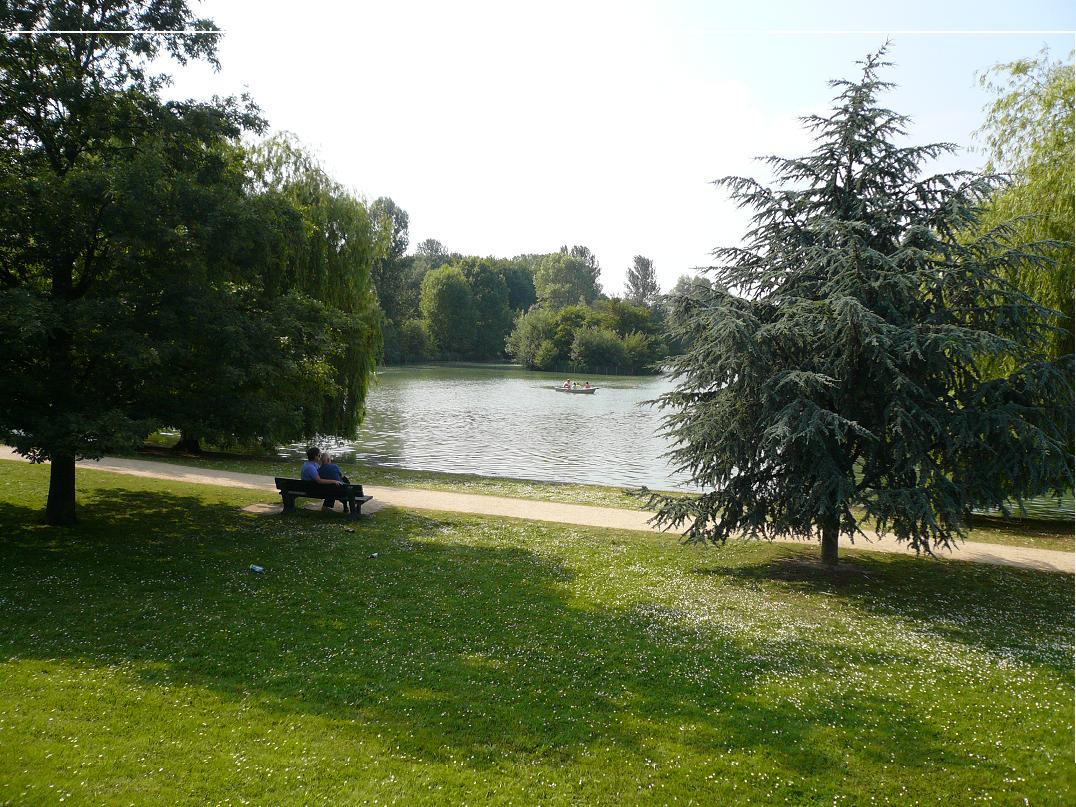
Stanborough Park, Northern Lake

Stanborough Park, also referred to as Stanborough Lakes is a 126-acre (0.51 km^{2}) park in Welwyn Garden City, Hertfordshire, England.

The park features two lakes, which were opened in 1970. They were created by gravel extraction carried out at the time of the building of the A1(M) motorway

The Boating Lake (the northern lake) at Stanborough is 11.3 acres (46,000 m^{2}) in size. It is a shallow lake, under three feet in depth with several small islands. The boating lake is fed by water from the River Lea at its north end and from a spring. Excess water flows over a weir back into the river at the south end. Coarse fish such as carp are bred in the boating lake and fishing is banned here. Pedalos & Rowing boats are available to hire. Splashlands splash park is situated on the North side of the park, open Easter to September and free to use. The Kiosk by Splashlands also sells hot drinks, ice-creams, chocolate bars, fizzy drinks, hot drinks, duck food and more.

The Sailing Lake (the southern lake) is 15.3 acres (62,000 m^{2}) in size. This lake has no islands but is deeper than the boating lake, more than six and a half feet deep in places. Unlike the Boating Lake the Sailing Lake is ground water fed. Before the lakes were built the River Lea used to flow through part of the Sailing Lake but it was re-directed to the west side. Many watersport activities take place here, including sailing, paddleboarding, kayaking and angling.

At the south end of the park there is access to Stanborough Reedmarsh, a Local Nature Reserve managed by the Herts and Middlesex Wildlife Trust.
