= Carthagena Weir =

Weir on the River Lea in Hertfordshire, England

Coordinates: 51.7440°N 0.0021°W

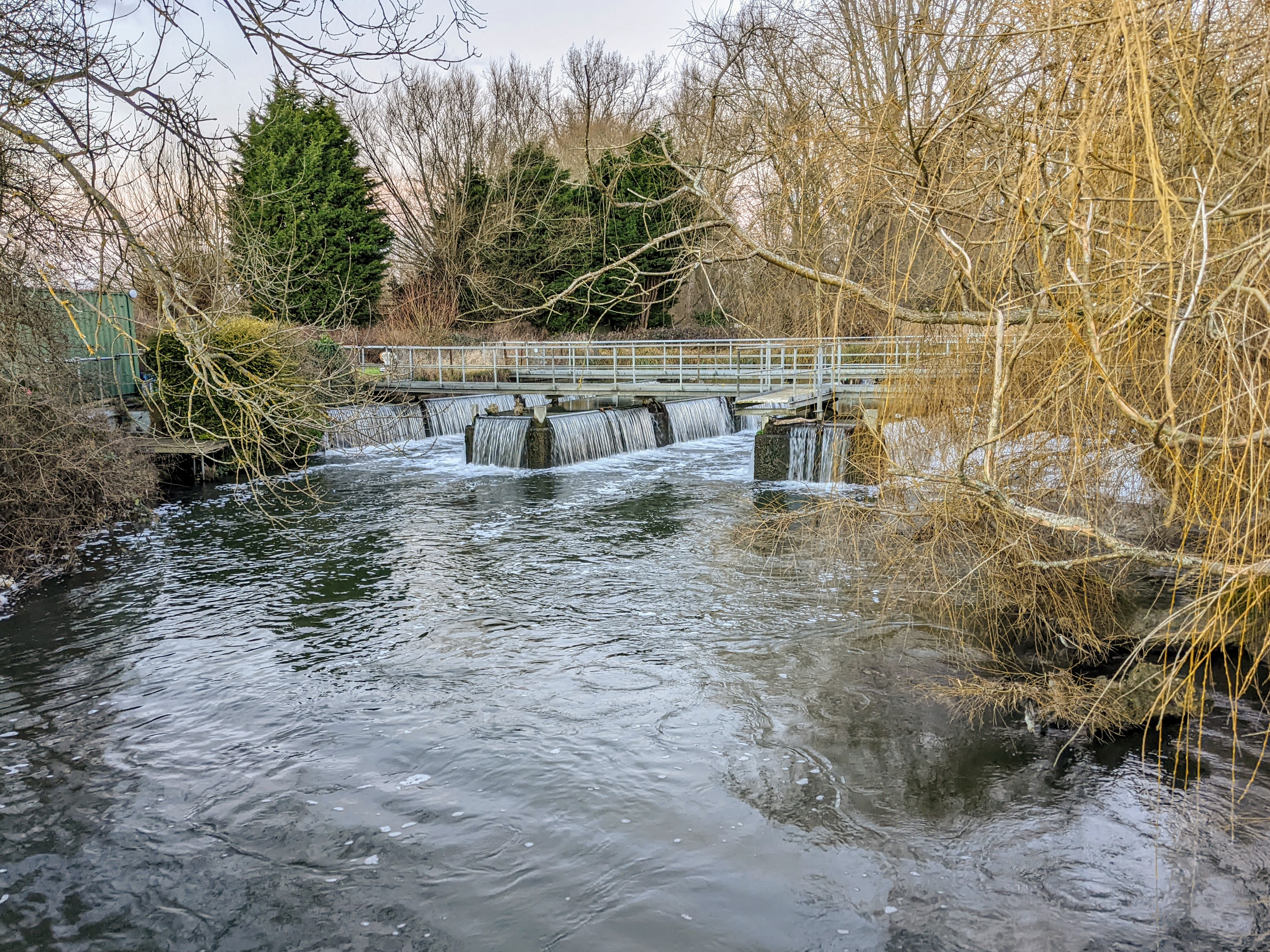
The weir

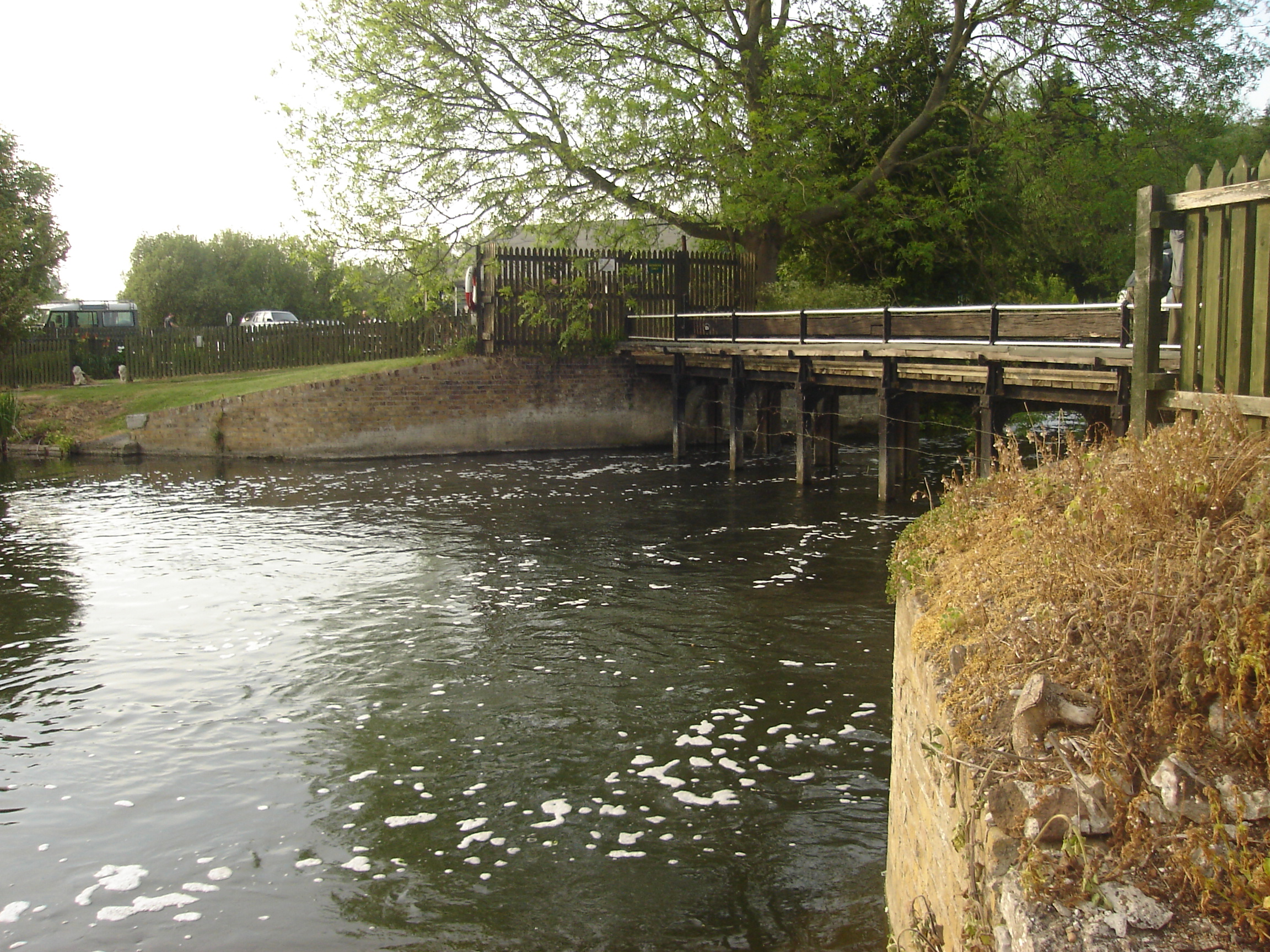
Below the weir

Carthagena Weir is a weir located at Broxbourne on the River Lea. The well oxygenated water with depths ranging to over 16 ft, makes it an ideal environment for coarse fish including the common barbel.

== Fishery ==
The weir is part of a complex known as the Carthagena Fisheries. Today the weir is known nationally for the quality of its chub fishing.

Well known anglers who have fished these waters include Chris Yates and Matt Hayes.

== Public access ==
Broxbourne railway station

Vehicular access via the B194 Nazeing New Road

Walking and cycling via the River Lee Navigations towpath which forms part of the Lea Valley Walk
