= Dobbs Weir =

Weir on the River Lea in Hertfordshire, England

Coordinates: 51.755902°N 0.004863°E

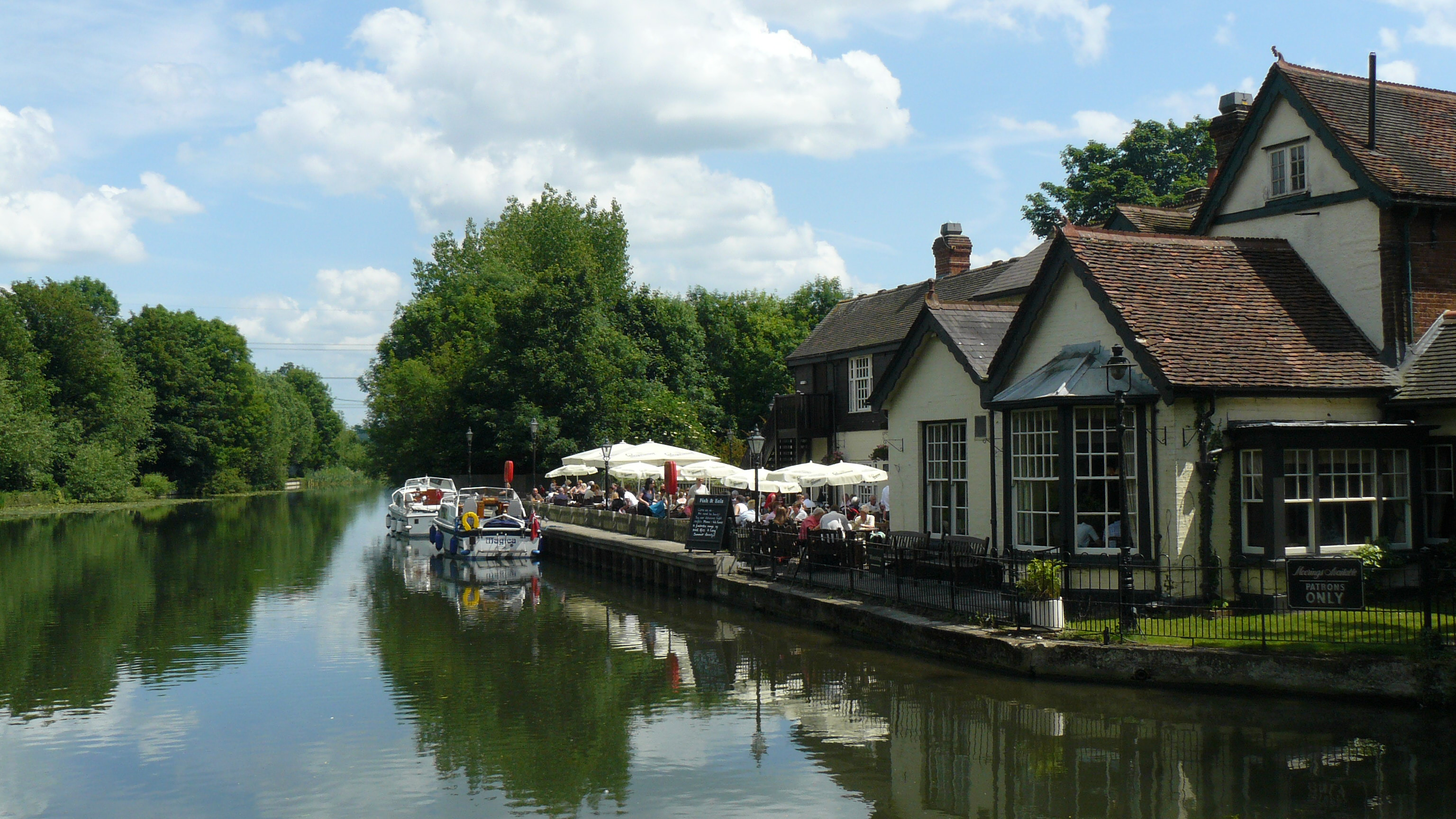
Fish and Eels public house

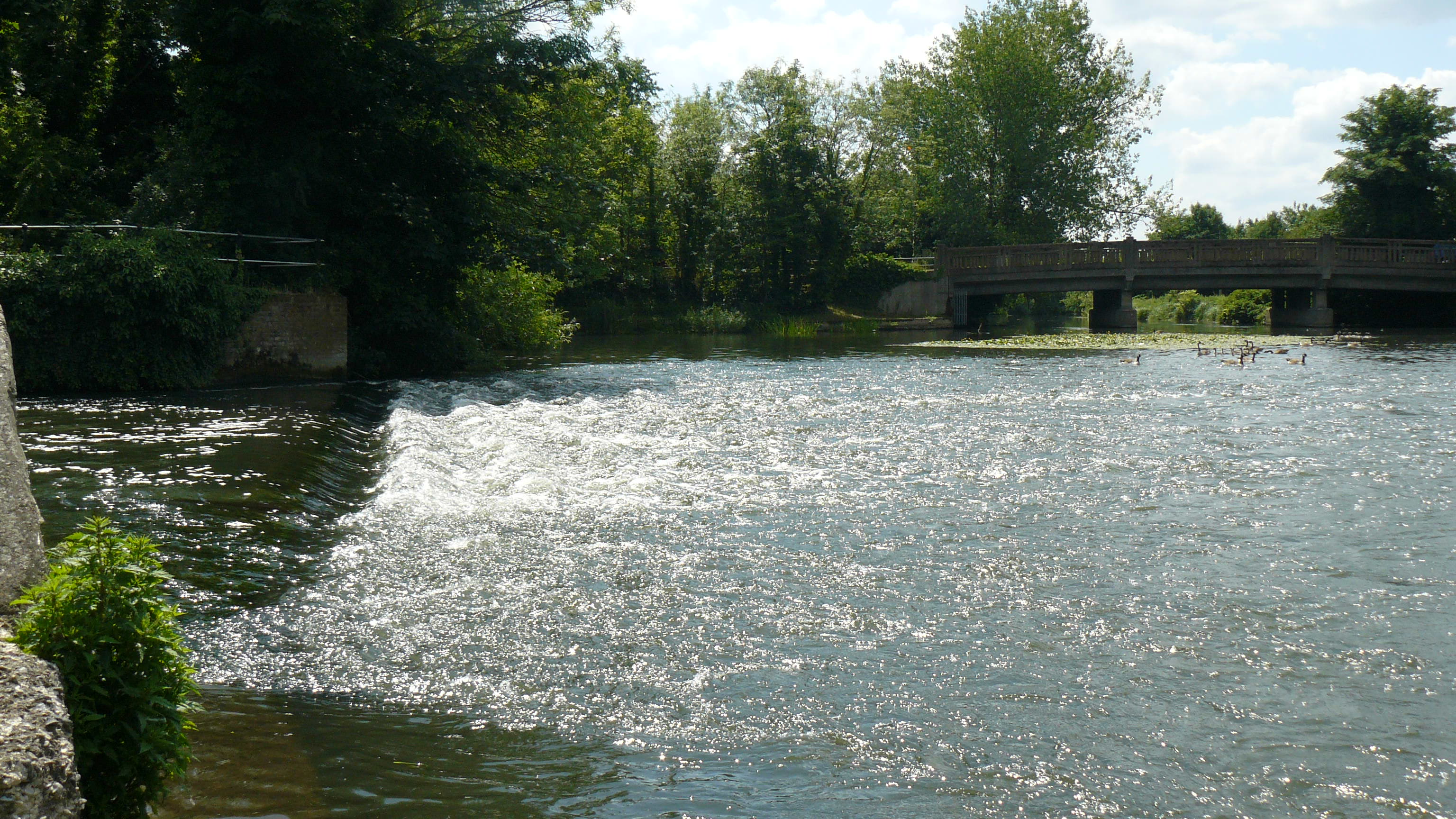
Weir pool with bridge. There is a clear Hydraulic jump visible as the water exits the weir slope and enters the pool.

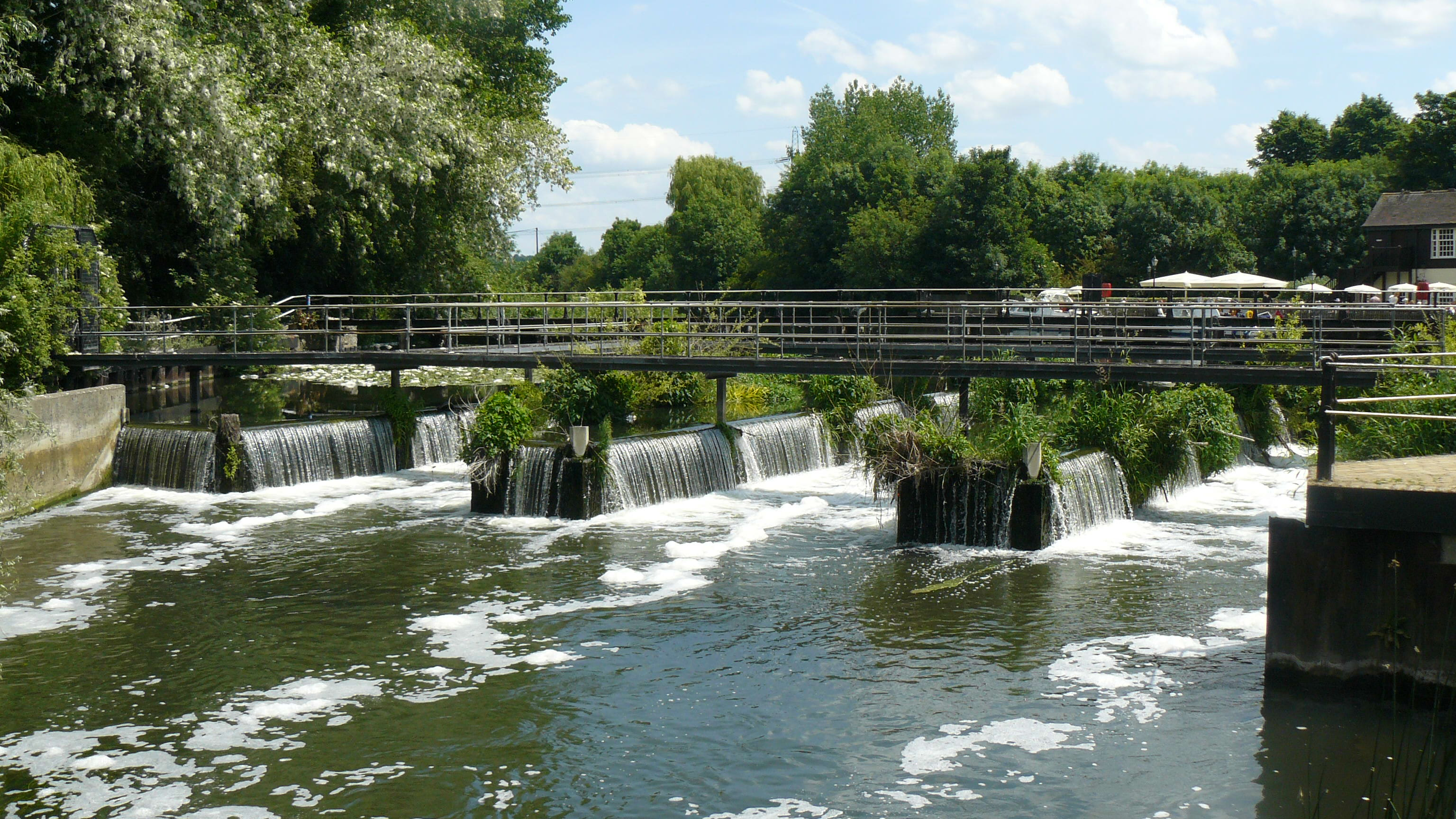
Main v-drops

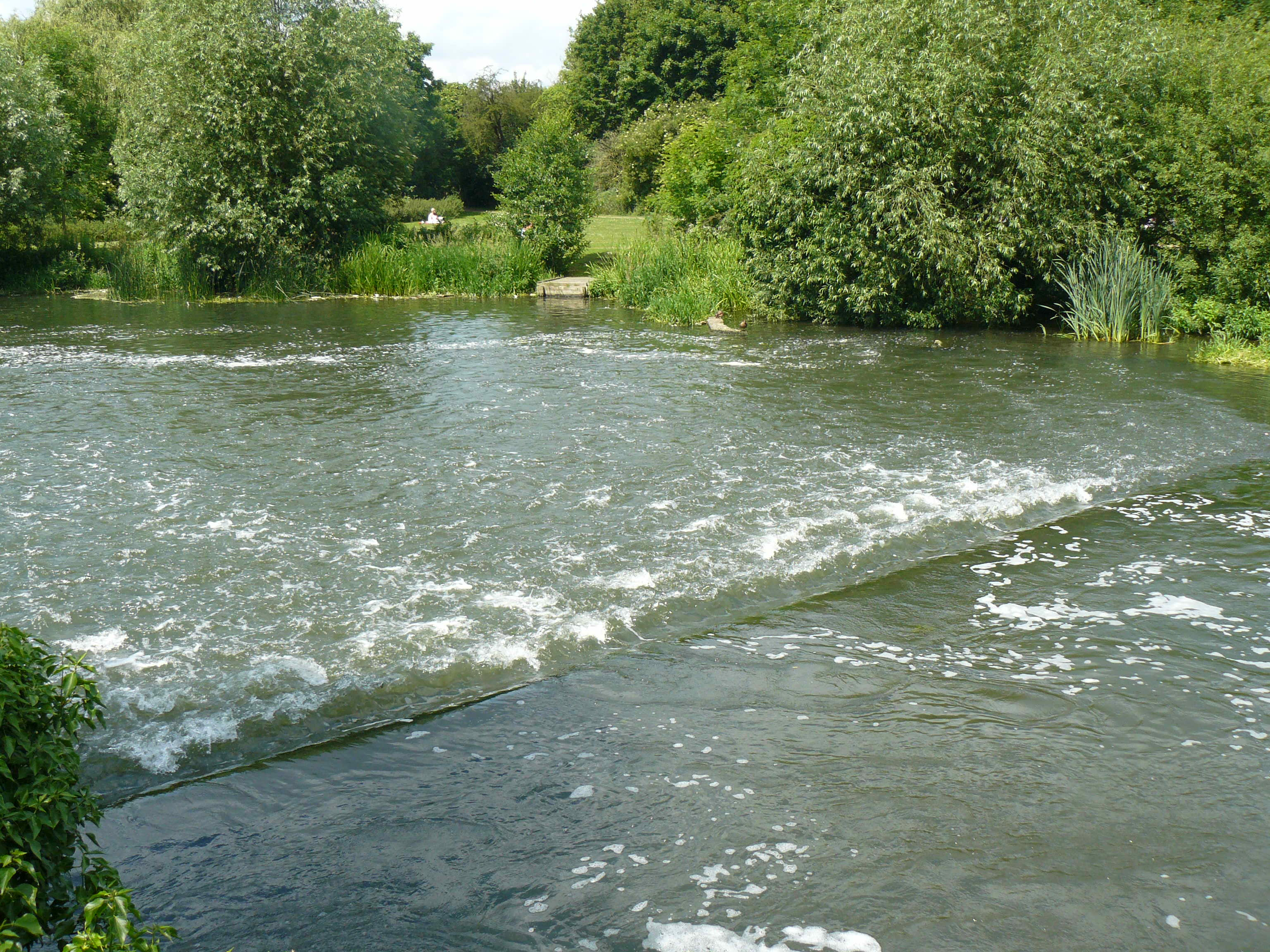
Weir pool and bankside

Dobbs Weir is both a weir in Hoddesdon, Hertfordshire and an area of Roydon, Essex in England on the River Lea. It is well known for angling, outdoor beauty and watersports. It is overlooked by the Fish and Eels pub.

== Angling ==
The weir is a popular fishery. In 2003, the then record chub, weighing 8.8 pounds, was caught by Tim Archer. The fishery is owned by the Lee Valley Regional Park Authority and is currently (2013) controlled by the partnership of Ware Angling Club and Hertford Angling Club forming a part of the Towpath Fishery. Day tickets are available on the bank. Season tickets are available by joining one of the controlling clubs.

== Watersports ==
Dobbs Weir has had a long history serving the watersports community, as the sluice gates after the v-drops could be changed according to the flow of the water. Especially in winter months after heavy rain, the weir could be changed into a formidable feature used for whitewater training or playboating.

== Repair ==
Since August 2003, when British Waterways padlocked the sluice gates, watersports enthusiasts have been forced to go elsewhere, as the site has been deemed unsafe and requires approximately £25,000 for the weir to be repaired.

== See also ==
- River Lea
- River Thames of which the River Lee is a tributary.
- Locks and Weirs on the River Lea
