= Stonebridge Lock =

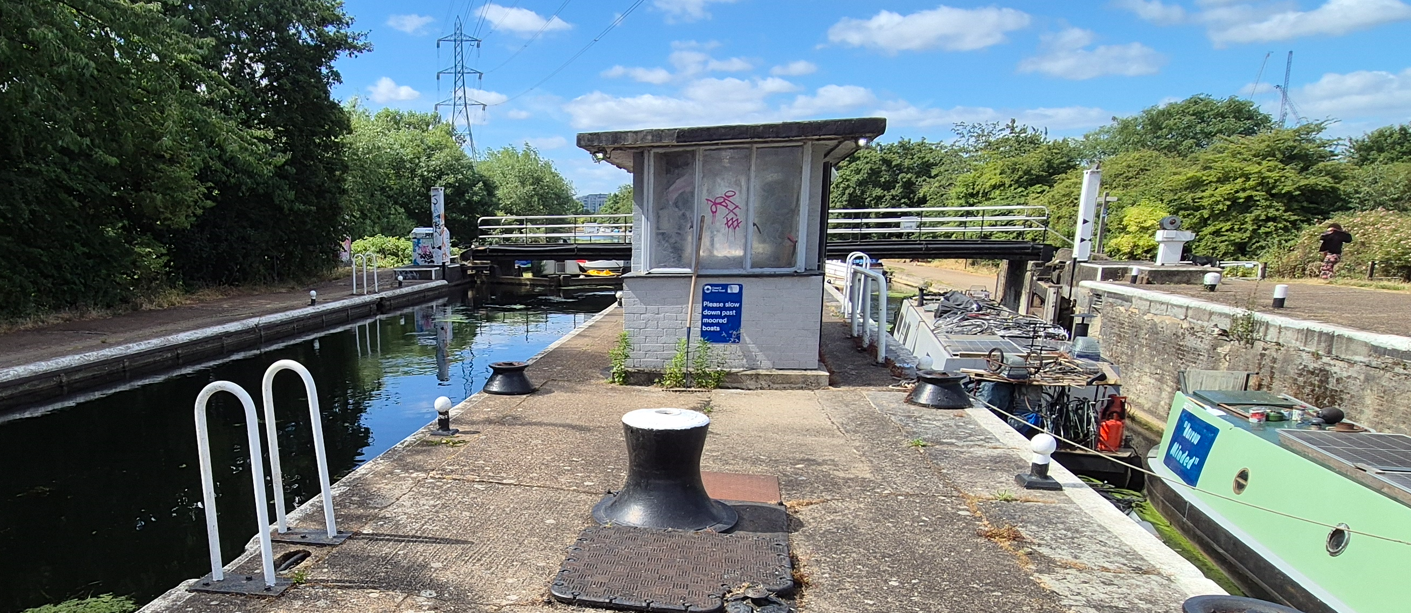
- Stonebridge Lock
- Interactive map of Stonebridge Lock
- 51.597106°N 0.050517°W
- Waterway: River Lea Navigation
- County: London Borough of Haringey; Greater London
- Maintained by: Canal & River Trust
- Operation: Mechanical/Manual
- Length: 95 feet (29 m)
- Width: 19 feet 6 inches (5.9 m)
- Fall: 6 feet 6 inches (2 m)
- Distance to Bow Creek: 8.3 miles (13.4 km)
- Distance to Hertford Castle Weir: 19.7 miles (31.7 km)

Stonebridge Lock (No16) is a paired lock on the River Lee Navigation in the London Borough of Haringey, England and is located near Tottenham, London. Like other locks as far as Ponder's End Lock it is large enough to take barges of up to 130 tons. The primary lock has been upgraded to mechanical operation, but the secondary lock is operated manually.

== Access to the lock ==
The lock is situated on the navigation between the Lockwood Reservoir on the Walthamstow side and Tottenham Marshes on the Tottenham side. The lock can be reached on foot only from Marsh Lane behind Northumberland Park railway station.

Pedestrian and cycle access via the towpath which forms part of the Lea Valley Walk

== Recreation ==
Angling is allowed on the River Lee Navigation upstream and downstream of the lock. Information from the River Lea Anglers Club.

== Facilities ==
Located north of Stonebridge Lock are several facilities for boaters and the general public. These include:

- Toilets
- Water Point
- Refuse Point
- Elsan
- Pump Out
- Cafe

== Gallery ==
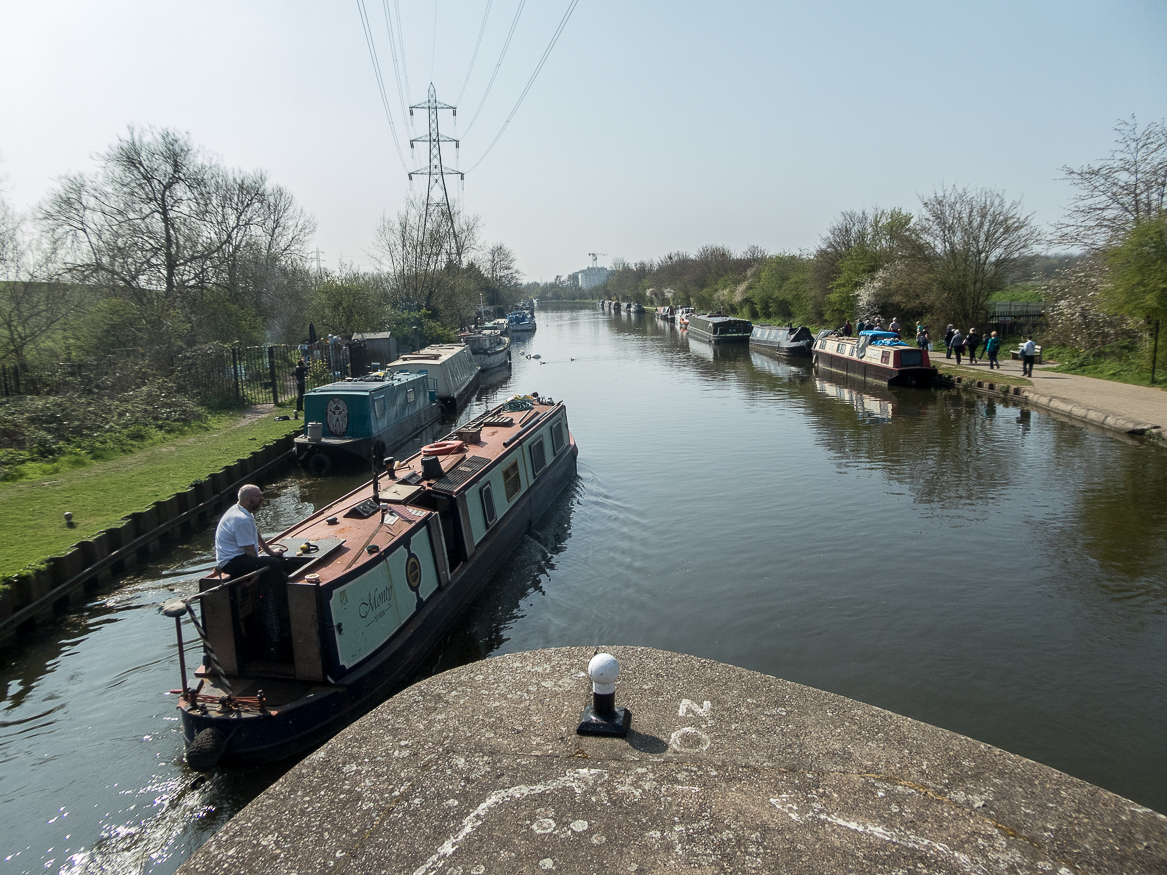
Looking south from the lock

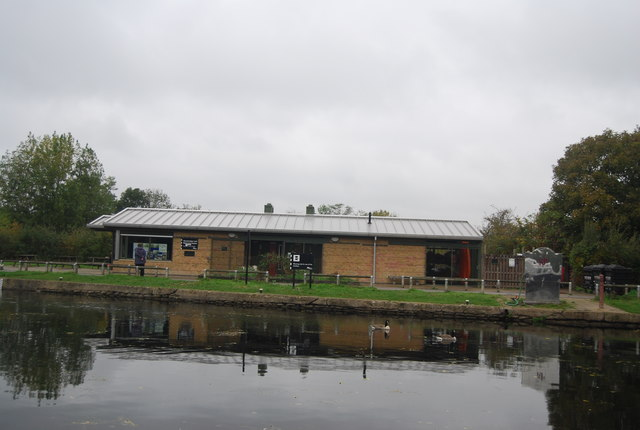
Facilities and Cafe north of the lock

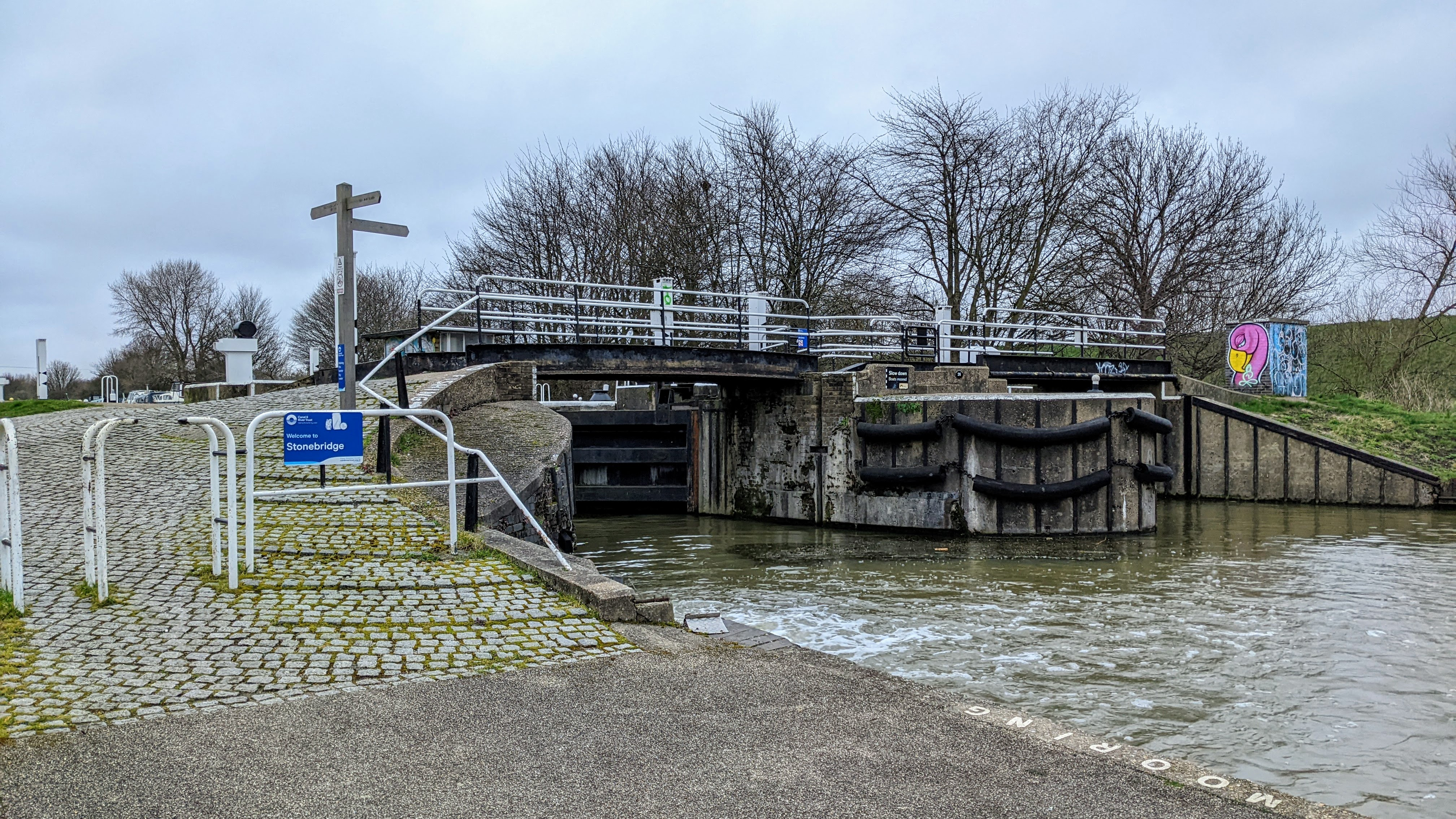
Stonebridge Lock looking North

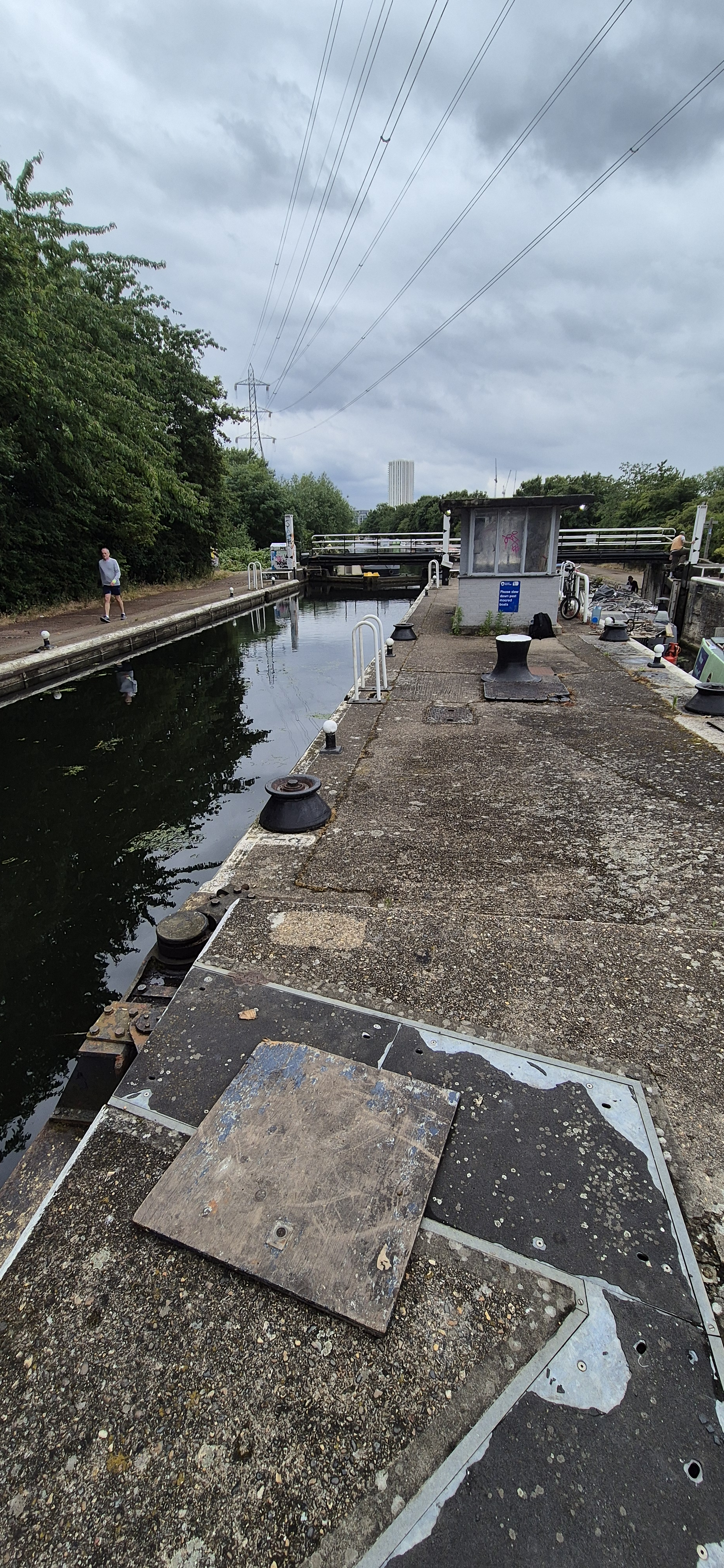
Stonebridge Lock looking south in 2024

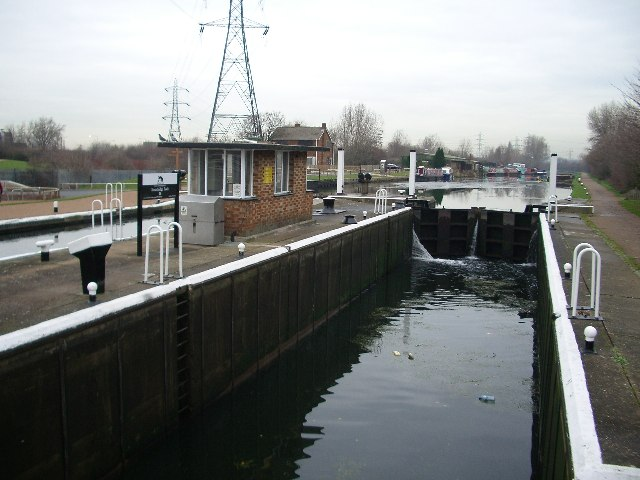
Stonebridge lock in 2005 under British Waterways

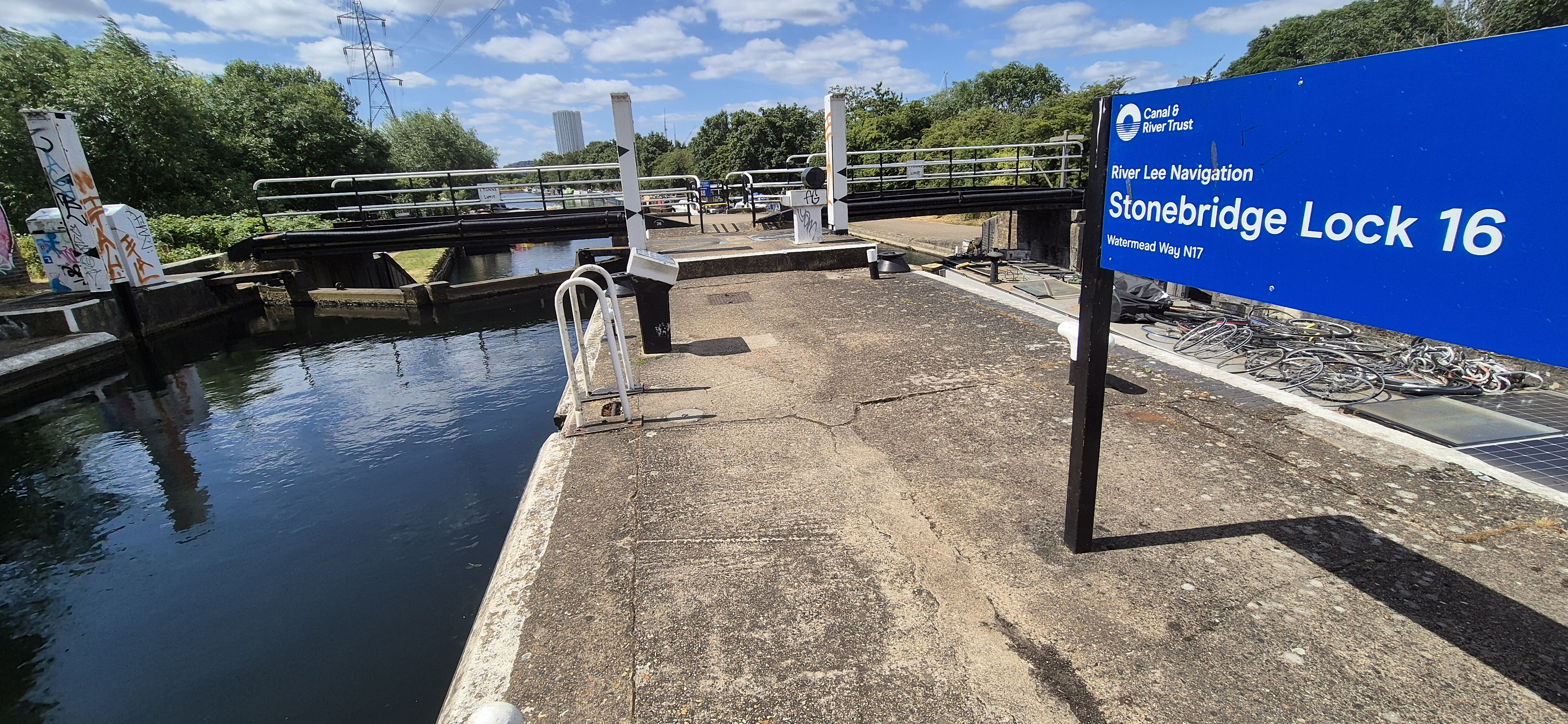
Stonebridge Lock with updated Canal and River Trust signage

Next lock upstream	River Lea Navigation	Next lock downstream
Pickett's Lock; 2.2 miles	Stonebridge Lock; Grid reference: TQ3501290548	Tottenham Lock; 0.9 miles
