= Lee Valley (disambiguation) =

Lee Valley or Lea Valley can refer to:

- Greer, Arizona, an unincorporated community founded as Lee Valley
- Lea Valley, the valley of the River Lea (or River Lee) in England
  - Lee Valley Park
    - Lee Valley Athletics Centre
    - Lee Valley Hockey and Tennis Centre
    - Lee Valley Ice Centre
    - Lee Valley Leisure Complex
    - Lee Valley VeloPark
    - Lee Valley White Water Centre
    - Lee Valley Regional Park Authority
- Lea Valley, Hertfordshire, a location in Wheathampstead parish
- Lee Valley, Ontario, an unincorporated community in Canada
- Lea Valley Academy, Enfield, England
- Lea Valley lines, railways in England
- Lee Valley Tools, Canadian purveyor of woodworking and gardening tools
