= Pickett's Lock (lock) =

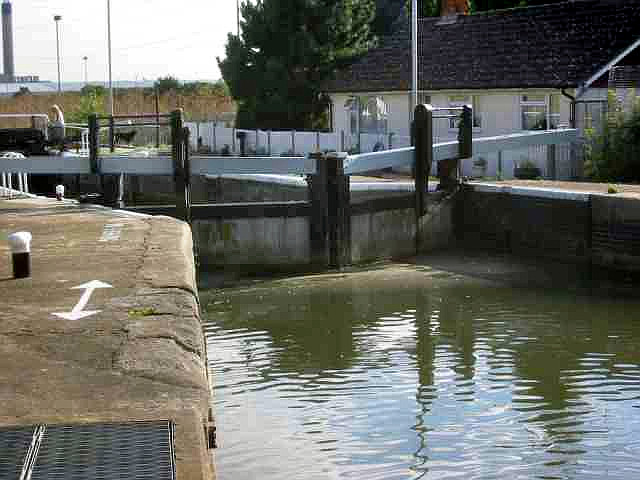
- Looking south at the lock and the lock-keeper's cottage
- Interactive map of Pickett's Lock
- 51°37′34″N 0°01′57″W
- Waterway: River Lee Navigation
- County: London Borough of Enfield; Greater London
- Maintained by: Canal & River Trust
- Operation: Manual
- First built: 1855
- Length: 95 feet (29 m)
- Width: 19 feet 6 inches (5.9 m)
- Fall: 6 feet 5 inches (2 m)
- Distance to Bow Creek: 10.5 miles (16.9 km)
- Distance to Hertford Castle Weir: 17.5 miles (28.2 km)

Pickett's Lock (No 15) is a lock on the River Lee Navigation in the London Borough of Enfield, England and is located near Edmonton, London. It gives its name to the surrounding area of Picketts Lock. In common with other locks as far upstream as Ponder's End Lock it is large enough to take barges of up to 130 tons. However it has not been upgraded to power operation and so it must be manually operated. It has gate paddles but these do not have gate baffles to mitigate the rush of water into the lock.

== Etymology ==
Picketts Lock was marked on the Ordnance Survey map of 1877, that is 'lock associated with the Picot or Pickett family'. Picketts feld (1669) located nearby is also named from this family, who take their surname from one Picot de Marisco ('of the marsh') recorded locally in the 13th century.

== History ==
The original lock was rebuilt following the River Lee Water Act 1855, enabling a second Edmonton lock to be closed.

In 2015, Pickett's Lock was temporarily renamed Alfie's Lock by the Canal & River Trust, in honour of local resident Alfie Saggs, the former lock keeper at the site.

== Access to the lock ==
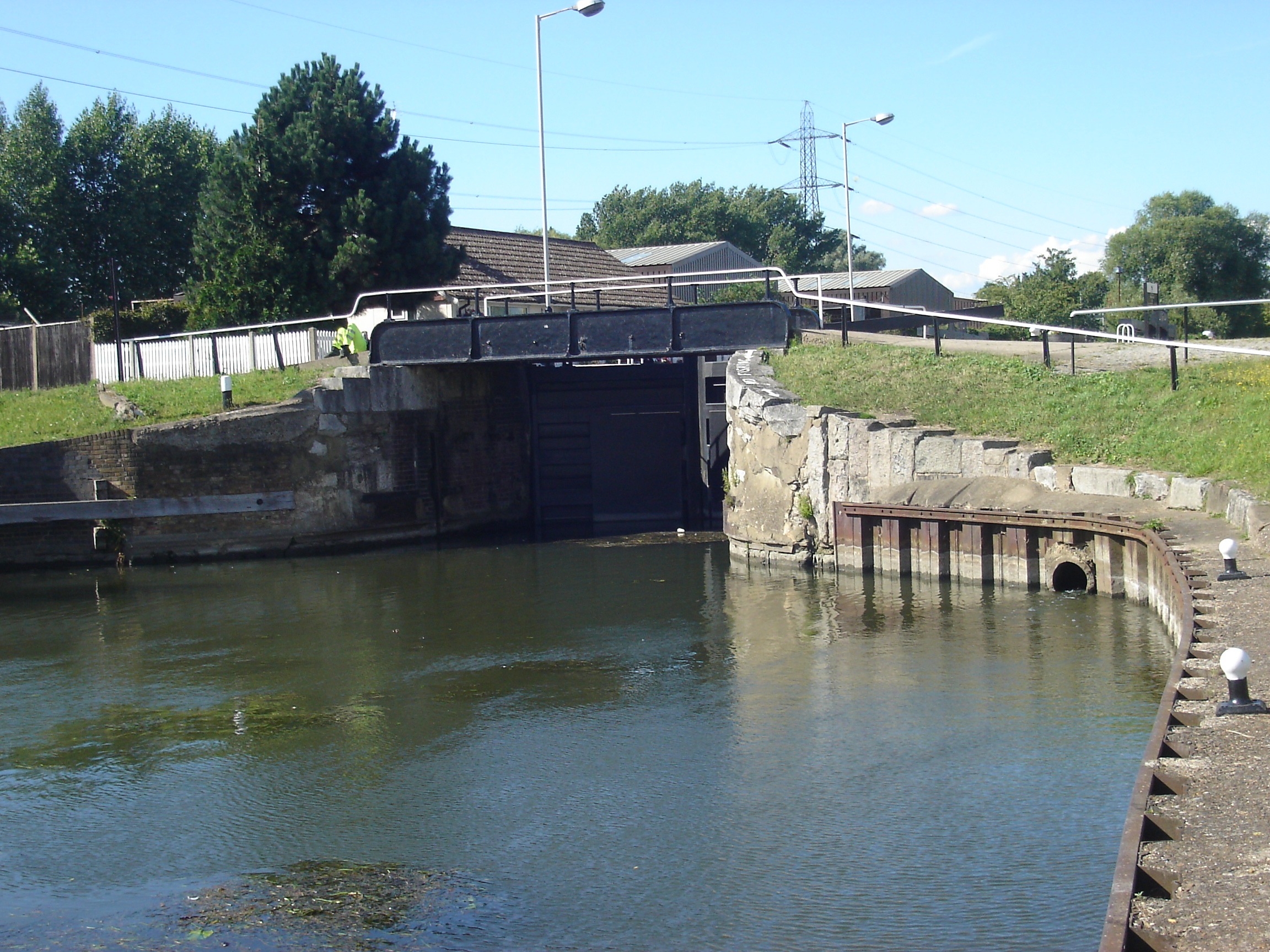
Below the lock

The lock is situated on the navigation between the William Girling Reservoir to the east, Deephams Sewage Treatment Works to the west and close to the Lee Valley Leisure Complex golf course.

The lock can be reached from Montagu Road, Edmonton via Pickett's Lock Lane which is part of the Pymmes Brook Trail. It can also be reached from the Lea Valley Viaduct via Lea Park Way and the River Lee's towpath which forms part of the Lea Valley Walk and the National Cycle Route 1.

== Recreation ==
Angling is allowed on the River Lee Navigation upstream and downstream of the lock. Information from the River Lea Anglers Club.

Next lock upstream	River Lee Navigation	Next lock downstream
Ponder's End Lock; 1.5 miles	Pickett's Lock (lock); Grid reference: TQ3617693803	Stonebridge Lock; 2.2 miles
