= Tottenham Lock =

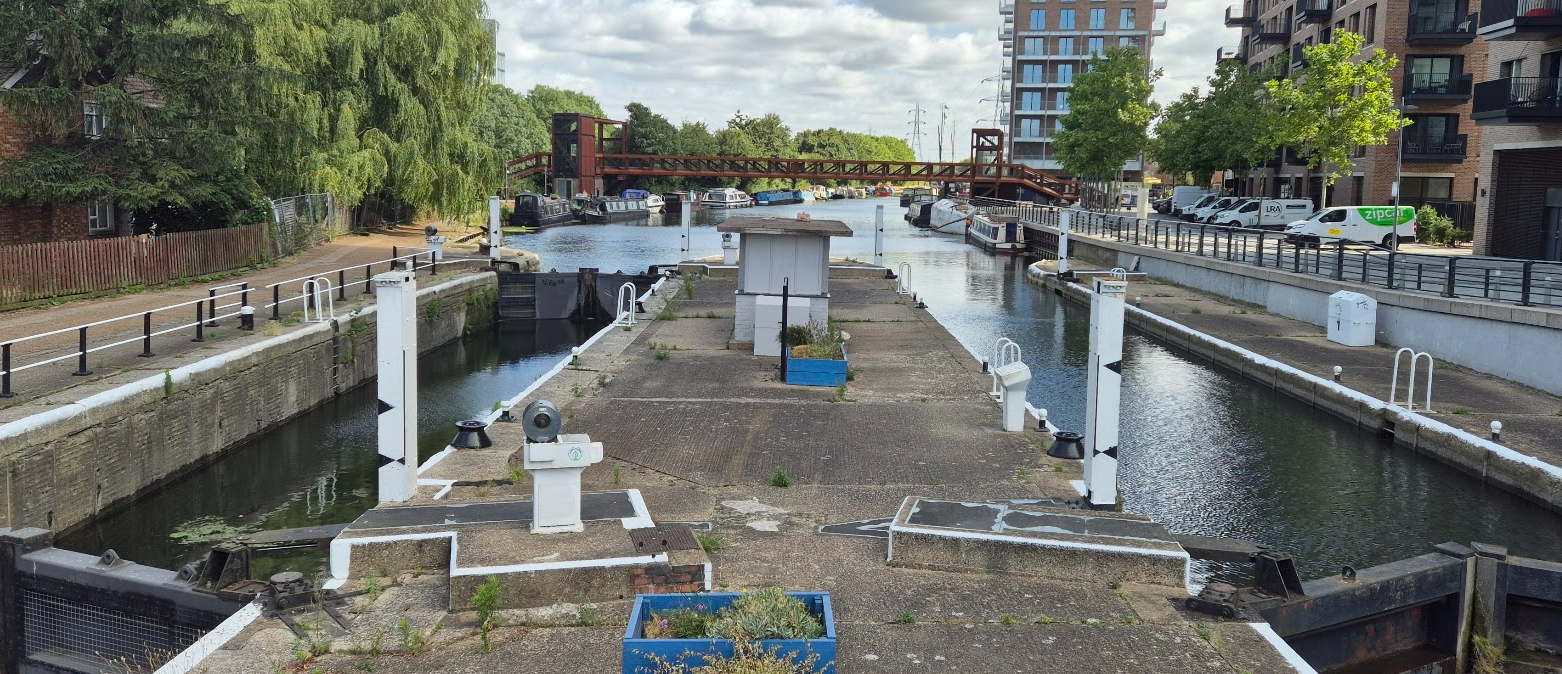
- Tottenham Lock
- Interactive map of Tottenham Lock
- 51°35′17″N 0°03′23″W
- Waterway: River Lee Navigation
- County: London Borough of Haringey; Greater London
- Maintained by: Canal & River Trust
- Operation: Mechanical/Manual
- Length: 95 feet (29 m)
- Width: 19 feet 6 inches (5.9 m)
- Fall: 6 feet 9 inches (2.1 m)
- Distance to Bow Creek: 7.3 miles (11.7 km)
- Distance to Hertford Castle Weir: 20.7 miles (33.3 km)

Tottenham Lock (No17) is a paired lock on the River Lee Navigation in the London Borough of Haringey, England and is located near Tottenham, London. Like other locks as far as Ponders End it is large enough to take barges of up to 130 tons. The primary lock has been upgraded to mechanical operation, but the secondary west lock is operated manually.

Tottenham Lock was originally nearer to Stonebridge, but was relocated to its current location when the cut was created, creating a junction just south of the lock.

== Transport ==
The nearest London Underground station is Tottenham Hale at Ferry Lane. The towpath is open to pedestrians and cyclists which forms part of the Lea Valley Walk.

== Recreation ==
Angling is allowed on the River Lee Navigation upstream of the lock. Information from the River Lea Anglers Club.

== Gallery ==
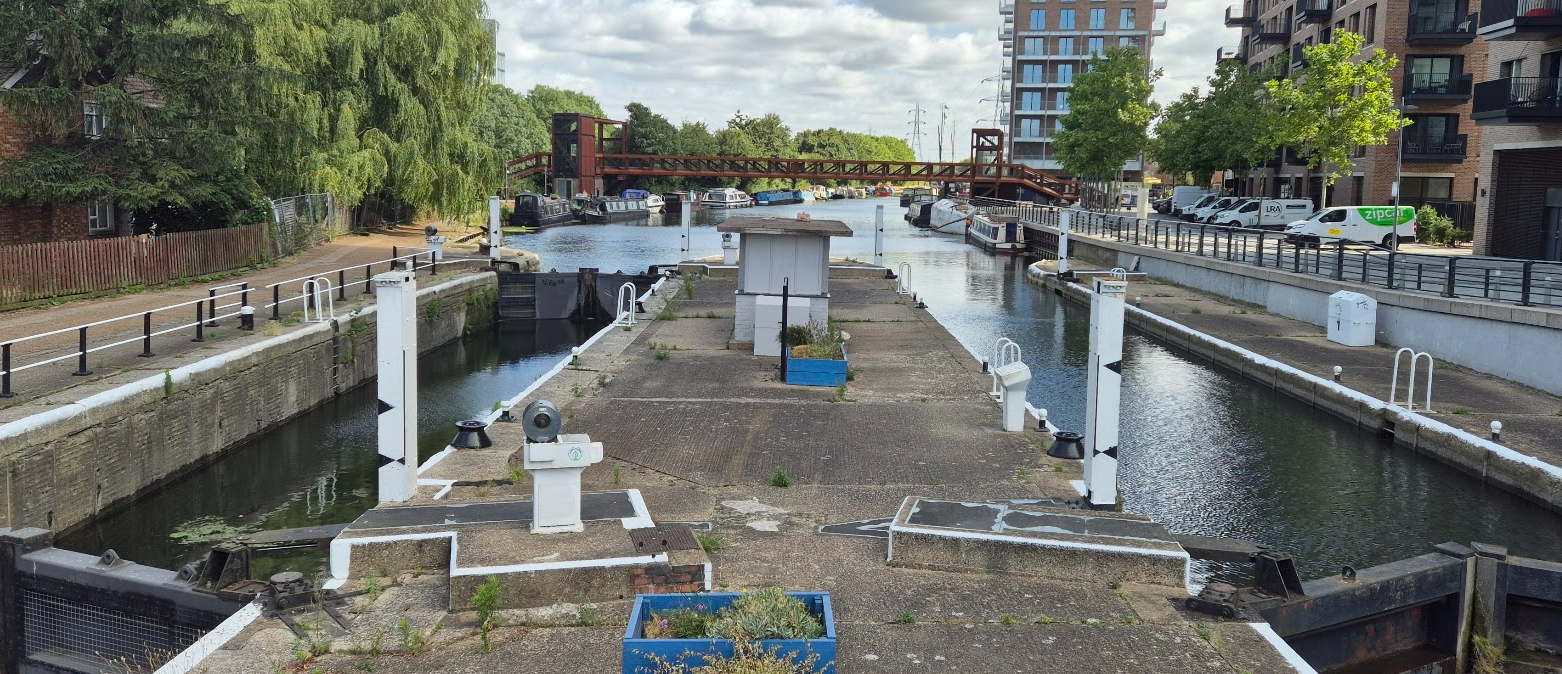
Tottenham Lock in 2024 after the area's redevelopment.

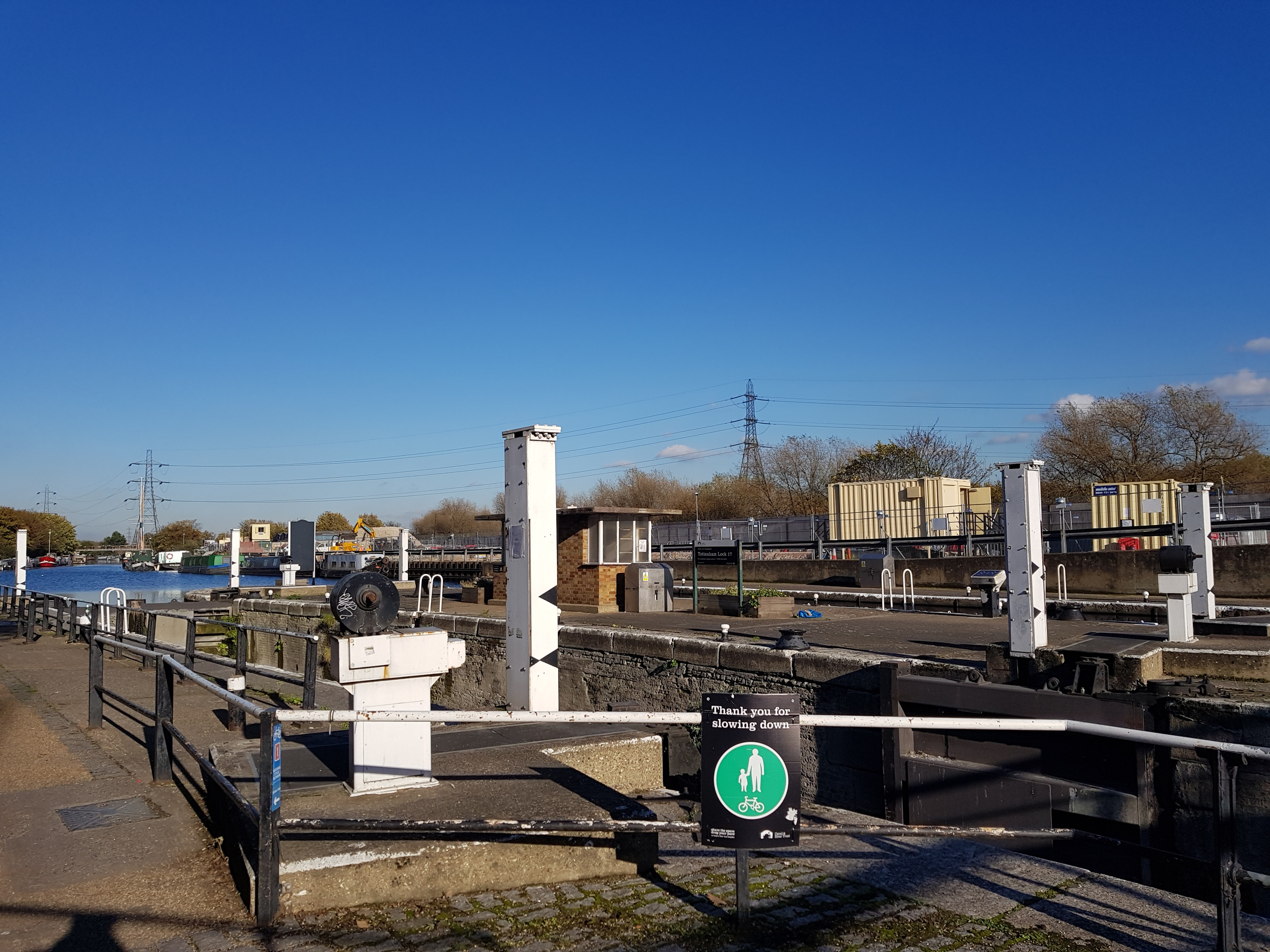
Tottenham Lock before the area's redevelopment

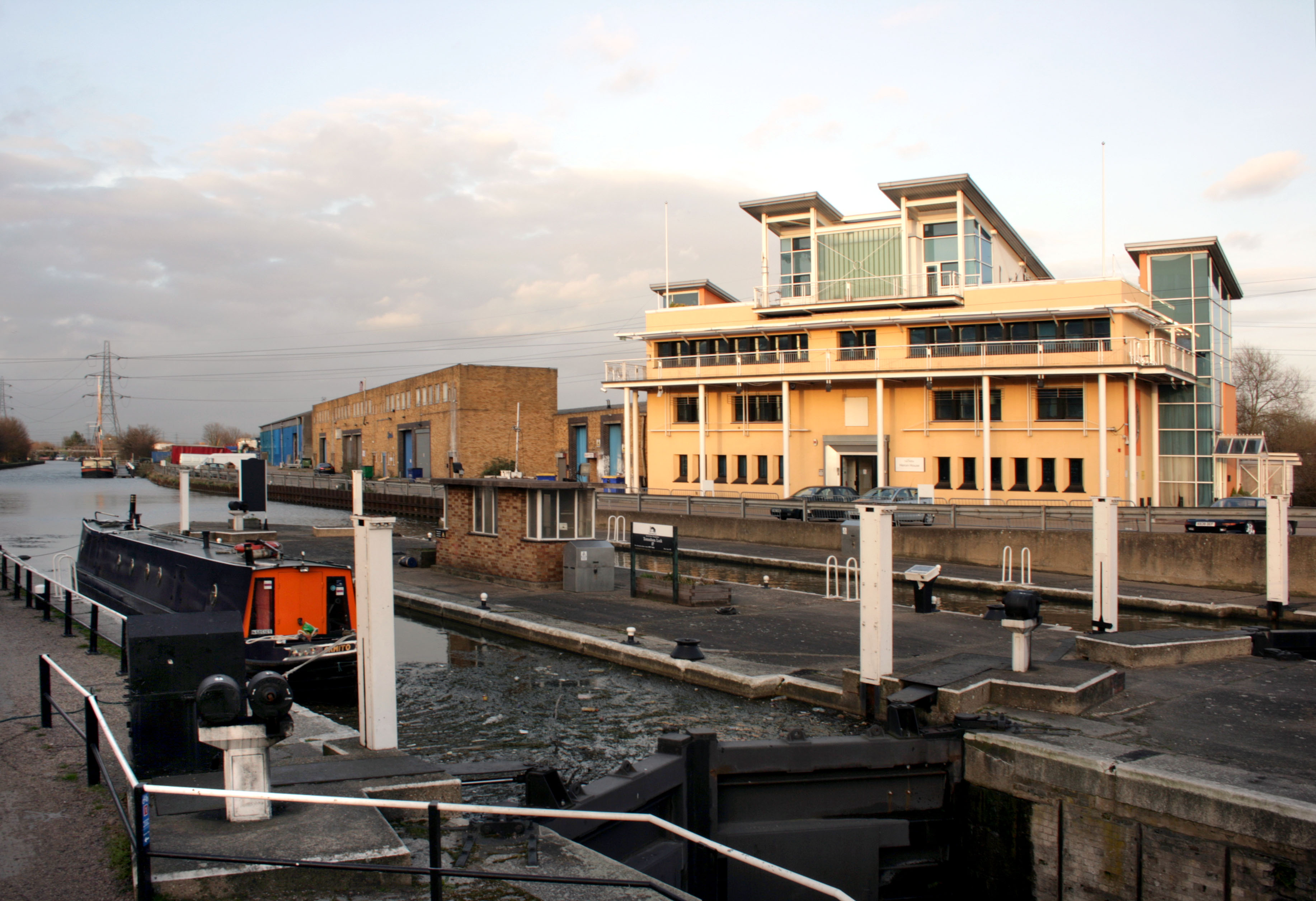
Tottenham lock in 2011 under British Waterways

Next lock upstream	River Lee Navigation	Next lock downstream
Stonebridge Lock; 0.9 miles	Tottenham Lock; Grid reference: TQ3463389530	Pond Lane Flood Gates; 2.5 miles
