= Picketts Lock =

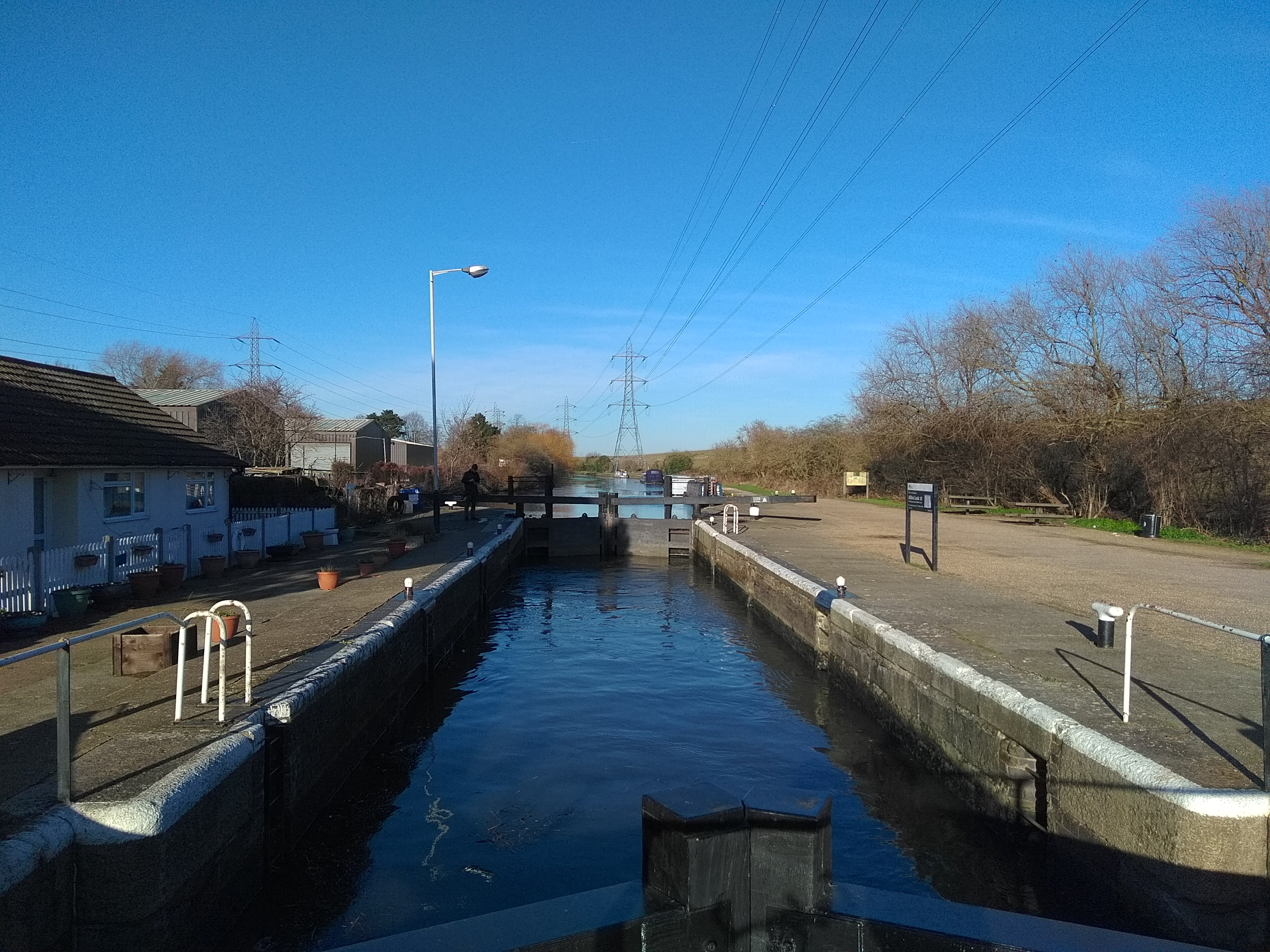
- The River Lee Navigation at Picketts Lock

- Location within Greater London
- OS grid reference: TQ362937
- London borough: Enfield
- Ceremonial county: Greater London
- Region: London
- Country: England
- Sovereign state: United Kingdom
- Post town: LONDON
- Postcode district: N9
- Dialling code: 020
- Police: Metropolitan
- Fire: London
- Ambulance: London
- UK Parliament: Edmonton and Winchmore Hill
- London Assembly: Enfield and Haringey

Picketts Lock or Pickett's Lock is an area of Edmonton, in the London Borough of Enfield. It is bordered by River Lee Navigation to the east, Pickett's Lock Lane to the south, Meridian Way A1055 to the west and the Ponders End industrial area to the north. The area takes its name from Pickett's Lock, a lock on the nearby River Lee Navigation.

== History ==
Historically the land was marshland and the hamlet here was known as Marshside. During the twentieth century the land was used for sand and gravel extraction which helped to form the waters known as the Blue Lakes.

The area was used by local people for outdoor pursuits such as shooting, angling, and ferreting, and is described in Terry Webb's book An Edmonton Boy: "My playground, the River Lea has now been changed into part of the Lee Valley Regional Park; it's been changed into an official playground but it's not the same with things being done for you."

After World War II the lakes were used for landfill. The former gravel workings were a key site for investigation of Pleistocene interglacial deposits.

During the late 1960s the area was acquired by the Lee Valley Regional Park Authority (LVRPA) to form part of the Lee Valley Park. The Pickett's Lock Sports Centre was designed by the Williamson Partnership with J.M.V Bishop of the (LVRPA). It was described in the Buildings of England as being "three large white functional boxes arranged around a central swimming pool, linked by generous circulation areas. Made a little less bleak by additions of 1993-4: restaurant, cafe and cinema, and an entrance block by Fitzroy Robinson & Partners". Also included were a nine-hole golf course and outdoor sports facilities and was completed by 1973 as the largest centre of its kind in Europe. One of the earliest international events held at the centre was the first World Age Group Trampoline Championships which were organised by Ted Blake. In later years, land including a disused sewage farm to the north of the centre was used to extend the golf course, and includes a man-made water known as Ponders End lake 51.6352°N 0.0333°W.

=== National Athletics Stadium ===
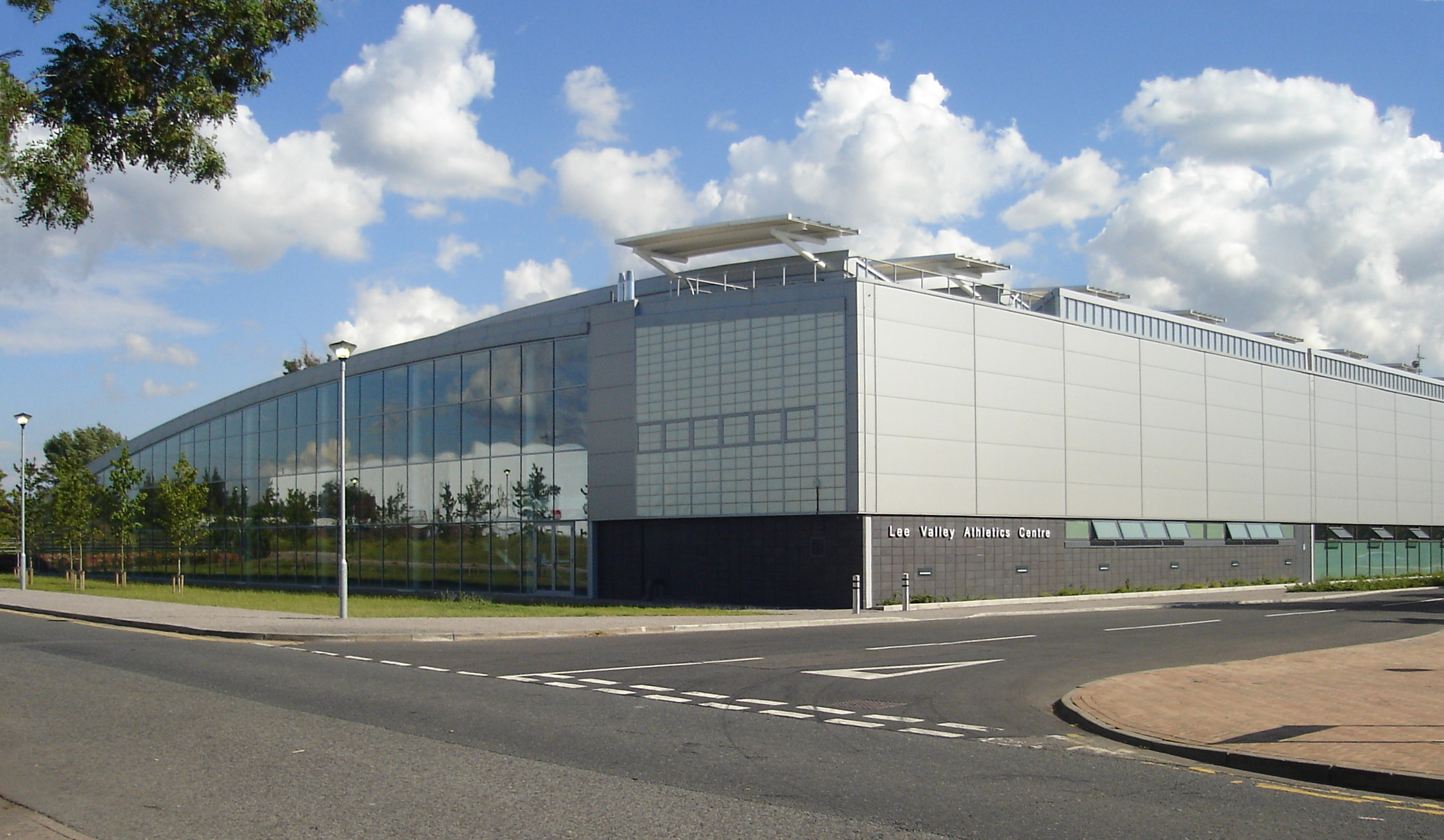
Lee Valley Athletics Centre

It was announced on 24 March 2000 that the site known as the Lee Valley Leisure Centre was to be the location of the National Athletics Stadium. Shortly afterwards it was confirmed as the venue of the 2005 World Athletics Championships. The proposed stadium would have a capacity of 43,000 and an original cost of £87m and would include new training facilities for athletes. The project was abandoned by the Government in October 2001 due to high costs and inadequate transport links and the UK withdrew as host to the 2005 World Athletics Championships.

However, the LVRPA, Sport England and UK Athletics went ahead with plans to create the most modern athletics training venue in the south of England on the site now known as the Lee Valley Athletics Centre. It was formally opened in 2007 and forms part of the Lee Valley Leisure Complex. The original 1973 Pickett Lock Sports Centre closed in 2002 and was demolished in 2004.

== Transport links ==
London buses route W8 and 191 and 192 serve the area.

The nearest accessible railway station is Edmonton Green. The West Anglia Main Line runs right through the area; albeit without a station.

== In popular culture ==
The now demolished Picketts Lock Sports Centre is featured in the BBC comedy Some Mothers Do 'Ave 'Em, with Michael Crawford roller-skating in and around the centre.
