= Lee Valley Athletics Centre =

Sports venue in London, England

Coordinates: 51°37′52″N 0°02′15″W

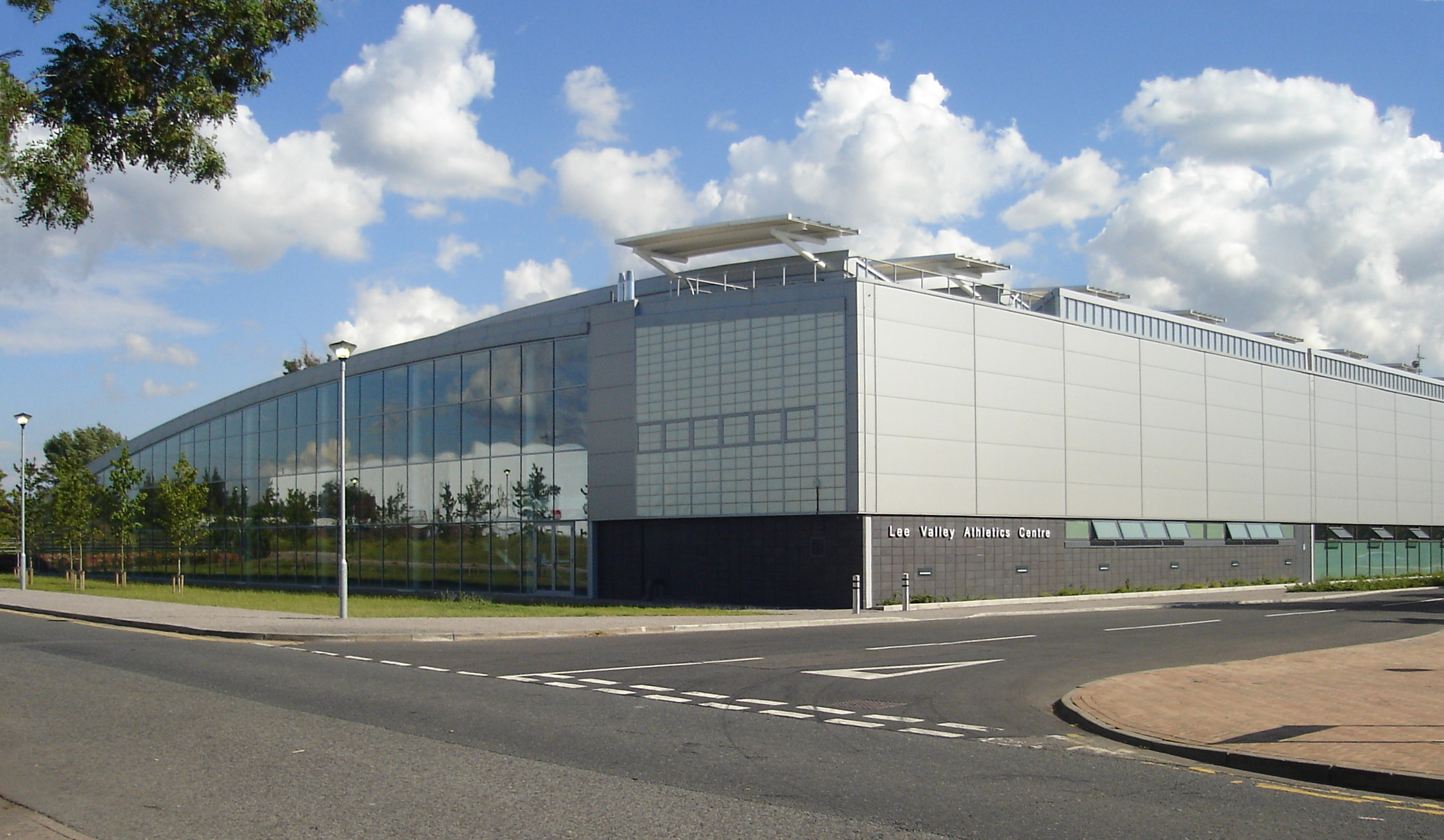
Lee Valley Athletics Centre, Edmonton

The Lee Valley Athletics Centre is located at the Lee Valley Leisure Complex formerly known as Picketts Lock in Edmonton, London Borough of Enfield. The centre cost £15m to build, and was officially opened on 16 January 2007 by Minister for the Olympics, Tessa Jowell. The centre is owned and managed by the Lee Valley Regional Park Authority (LVRPA)

The centre is the largest indoor and outdoor athletics facility serving London and South East England. Housing the only indoor 200 metre six lane track in the South of England, it also comprises a 130-metre sprint straight, permanent seating for 500 spectators both inside and out, full jumps and throws capacity, and cutting-edge sports science and physiotherapy suites. The site is open to the general public as well as elite athletes. On 11 September 2014, the centre hosted the Invictus Games.

== Public transport ==
Rail

- Ponders End railway station

Bus

- London bus W8, Metroline
