= Ponders End Lock =

Lock on the Lee Navigation in England

- Ponders End Lock
- Interactive map of Ponders End Lock
- 51°38′31″N 0°01′48″W
- Waterway: River Lee Navigation
- County: London Borough of Enfield; Greater London
- Maintained by: Canal & River Trust
- Operation: Mechanical/manual
- Length: 95 feet (29.0 m)
- Width: 19 feet 6 inches (5.9 m)
- Fall: 7 feet 4 inches (2.2 m)
- Distance to Bow Creek: 12 miles (19.3 km)
- Distance to Hertford Castle Weir: 16 miles (25.7 km)

Ponders End Lock (No 14) is a paired lock on the River Lee Navigation in England and is located near Ponders End, London. It is the last lock upstream that is large enough to take barges of up to 130 tons.

== History ==
The lock was fully mechanised and duplicated in 1959, and was the first major work in a £864,000 British Waterways project to improve the Navigation. Work was completed in twelve months.

== Access to the lock ==
The lock is located in Wharf Road close to the crossing of the Lea Valley Road A110 and is near Ponders End railway station. Pedestrian and cycle access is by the Lea Valley Walk.

== Recreation ==
Angling is allowed on the River Lee Navigation upstream and downstream of Ponders End Lock.

Next lock upstream	River Lea Navigation	Next lock downstream
Enfield Lock; 1.5 miles	Ponders End Lock; Grid reference: TQ3629795577	Pickett's Lock; 1.5 miles
