= Lee Valley Leisure Complex =

Coordinates: 51.6307°N 0.0377°W

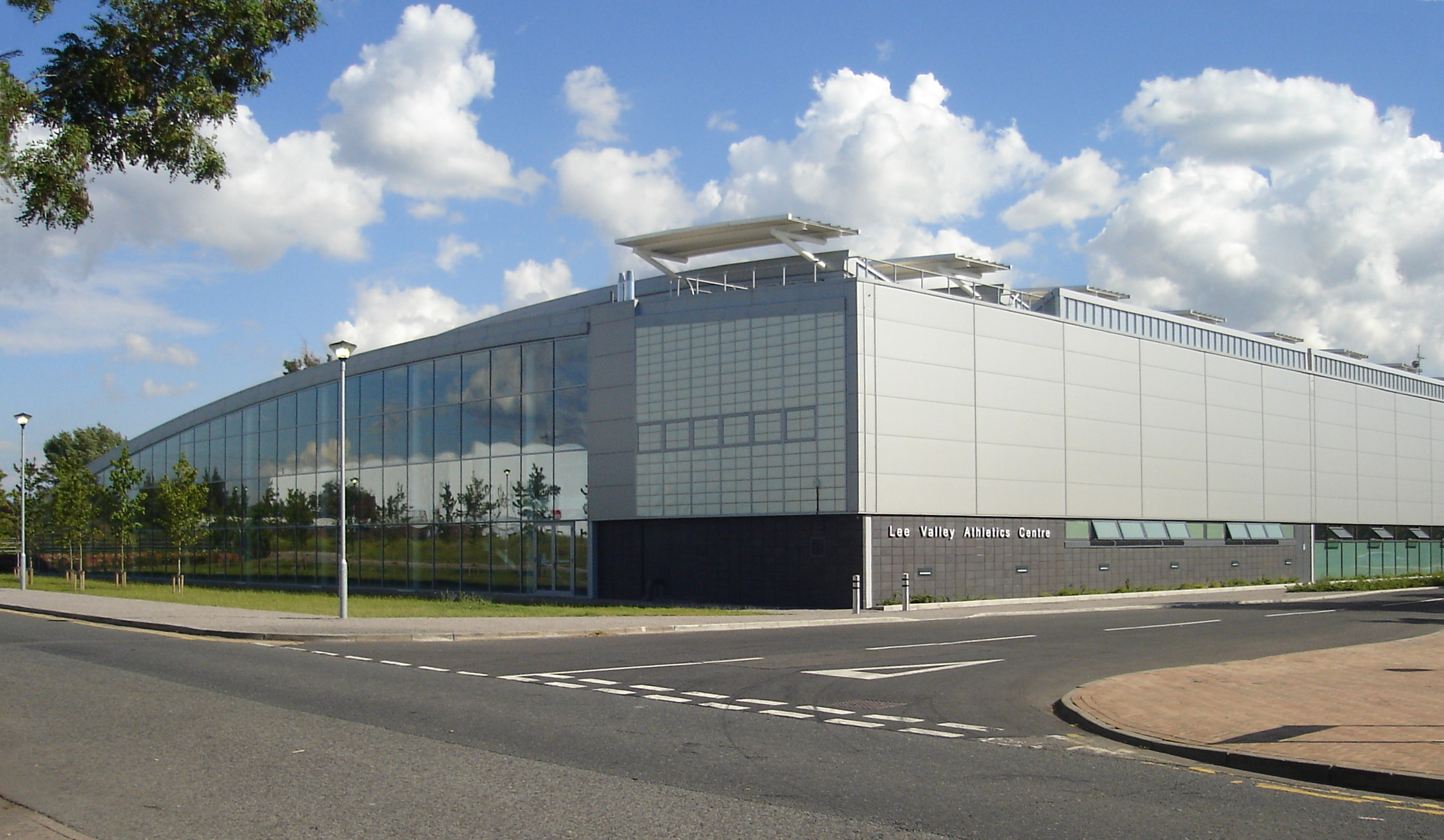
Lee Valley Athletics Centre

Lee Valley Leisure Complex is located at Edmonton in the Middle Lea Valley, and is part of the Lee Valley Park.

The site was formerly known as the Picketts Lock Sports Centre. In 2000 it was announced that the centre would be the site of the National Athletics Stadium, and it was intended that it would host the 2005 World Athletics Championships. The project was abandoned by the Government in October 2001 on the grounds of increased costs and inadequate transportation links.

It now comprises an 18-hole golf course which borders the River Lee Navigation, camping site, indoor bowls club (housed in the remains of the now-demolished Picketts Lock Sports Centre), multiplex cinema and restaurants. A new athletics centre was formally opened on 16 January 2007. The complex is owned and managed by the Lee Valley Regional Park Authority (LVRPA).

== Transport ==
- Vehicular access Meridian Way A1055
- Nearest railway station Ponders End railway station
- London Buses Route W8 Metroline
