= Lee Navigation =

Canalised river in Hertfordshire and London, England

Coordinates: 51.6258°N 0.0325°W

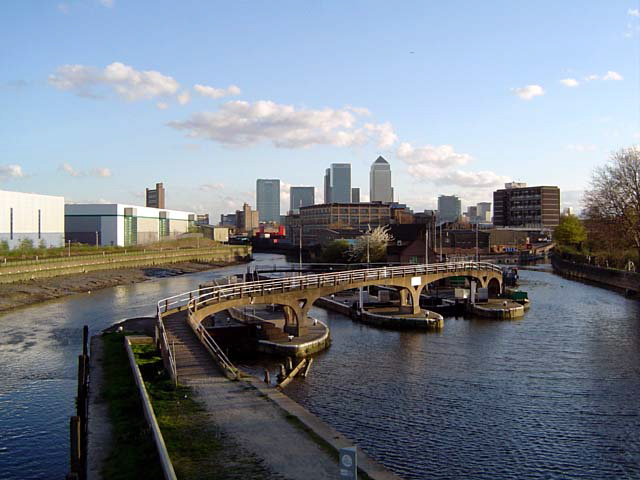
- Lee Navigation at Bow Creek
- Interactive map of Lee Navigation

Specifications
- Length: 27.5 miles (44.3 km)
- Maximum boat length: 88 ft 0 in (26.82 m)
- Maximum boat beam: 15 ft 9 in (4.80 m)
- Locks: 21
- Status: Open
- Navigation authority: Canal & River Trust

History
- Principal engineer: Thomas Yeoman
- Other engineer: Edward Rubie
- Date of act: 29 June 1767
- Date completed: 1771

Geography
- Start point: Hertford Castle Weir
- End point: River Thames
- Branches: Stort Navigation; Hertford Union Canal; Bow Back Rivers; Limehouse Cut

The Lee Navigation is a canalised river incorporating the River Lea (also called the River Lee along the sections that are navigable). It flows from Hertford Castle Weir to the River Thames at Bow Creek; its first lock is Hertford Lock and its last Bow Locks.

== Name ==
The Lee Navigation is named by acts of Parliament and is so marked on Ordnance Survey maps. Constructed elements and human features are spelled Lee, such as the canal system and Lee Valley Park. The un-canalised river is spelled Lea, along with other natural features such as Lower Lea Valley.

== History ==
The River Lea is a major tributary of the River Thames. It has a long association with navigation, as the marshes of Walthamstow have produced a dugout canoe from the Bronze Age and parts of a Saxon barge. According to the Anglo-Saxon Chronicle, the river was used by Viking raiders, and King Alfred changed the level of the river to strand Guthrum and his fleet. In more peaceful times, it became important for the transport of grain from Hertfordshire, but navigation of its southernmost tidal reaches of Bow Creek were difficult due to its tortuous meanders.

River Lee Navigation Act 1425
- Act of Parliament
- Parliament of England
- Long title: Chancellor may award commissions to reform the River Lee.
- Citation: 3 Hen. 6. c. 5
- Territorial extent: England and Wales; Ireland

Dates
- Royal assent: 14 July 1425
- Commencement: 30 April 1425 (Note: Start of session.)
- Repealed: 30 July 1948
Other legislation
Repealed by	Statute Law Revision Act 1948
Relates to	River Lee Navigation Act 1430; River Lee Navigation Act 1571

Status: Repealed

Text of statute as originally enacted

River Lee Navigation Act 1430
- Act of Parliament
- Parliament of England
- Long title: The chancellor of England may grant his commission to certain persons to scour, and amend the river Ley in the counties of Essex, Hertford, and Middlesex.
- Citation: 9 Hen. 6. c. 9
- Territorial extent: England and Wales; Ireland

Dates
- Royal assent: 12 January 1431
- Commencement: 20 March 1431
- Repealed: 30 July 1948
Other legislation
Repealed by	Statute Law Revision Act 1948
Relates to	1 Hen. 4. c. 12; 25 Edw. 3. Stat. 3. c. 4; 45 Edw. 3. c. 2; River Lee Navigation Act 1425; River Lee Navigation Act 1571

Status: Repealed

Text of statute as originally enacted

There is documentary evidence that the river was altered by the Abbot of Waltham to improve navigation in 1190, and in 1221, a pipe was laid across the river, which had to be protected from "the oars or poles of the watermen." The first act of Parliament for improvement of the river, the River Lee Navigation Act 1425 (3 Hen. 6. c. 5), was granted in 1425, this also being the first act granted for navigational improvement in England. A second act was passed in 1430, River Lee Navigation Act 1430 (9 Hen. 6. c. 9), and both authorised local landowners to act as commissioners, who could make improvements to the river including scouring or dredging, and could recoup the cost of the work by levying tolls.

River Lee Navigation Act 1571
- Act of Parliament
- Parliament of England
- Long title: An Acte for the brynging of the Ryver of Lee to the Northside of the Citie of London.
- Citation: 13 Eliz. 1. c. 18
- Territorial extent: England and Wales

Dates
- Royal assent: 29 May 1571
- Commencement: 2 April 1571
- Repealed: 30 July 1948
Other legislation
Amended by	Lee Navigation Improvement Act 1850
Repealed by	Statute Law Revision Act 1948
Relates to	River Lee Navigation Act 1425; River Lee Navigation Act 1430

Status: Repealed

Text of statute as originally enacted

By 1571, the river was an important route for the carriage of grain to London, and the City of London obtained another act, the River Lee Navigation Act 1571 (13 Eliz. 1. c. 18) to authorise improvements. This included making new cuts, and creating towpaths on both sides of the river. Shoals were removed, and a cut, probably the section which is now called Bow River from Old Ford Locks to Bow Locks, was excavated, which was not subject to any tolls. The plan for a branch from the river to the north of London was not implemented. One innovation was the construction of a pound lock at Waltham Abbey, Essex, in 1577. This had mitred gates at each end, and was probably the second lock to be built in England, although it was the first to be built on a river. It inspired Vallens to write a poem entitled "A tale of Two Swannes" about it in 1590. It was 70 by 24 feet (21.3 by 7.3 m), with wooden sides. The remainder of the control of levels was carried out by "staunches" or "turnpikes", consisting of a single vertically lifting gate in a weir, through which boats were pulled against the current.

The New River was an attempt to supply clean water from near Ware to the citizens of London, which was completed in 1633. However, the springs at Great Amwell soon proved to be inadequate, and water was drawn from the Lea. The increased extraction of water had a detrimental effect on milling and navigation, and by the early 1700s it had become clear that major work would be needed to produce a solution.

=== Smeaton's design ===
River Lee Navigation Act 1738
- Act of Parliament
- Parliament of Great Britain
- Long title: An Act for ascertaining, preserving, and improving, the Navigation of the River Lee, from the Town of Hertford, to the Town of Ware, in the County of Hertford; and for preserving and improving the said River, from the said Town of Ware, to the new Cut, or River, made by the Mayor, Commonalty, and Citizens of London; and for enabling the Governor and Company of The New River the better to supply the Cities of London and Westminster, and the Liberties and Suburbs thereof, with good and wholesome Water.
- Citation: 12 Geo. 2. c. 32
- Territorial extent: Great Britain

Dates
- Royal assent: 13 June 1739
- Commencement: 24 June 1739 (Note: Section 1.)
Other legislation
Amended by	Lee Navigation Improvement Act 1850; Lee Conservancy Act 1868
Relates to	River Lee Navigation Act 1767; River Lee Navigation Act 1779

Status: Amended

Text of statute as originally enacted

A petition was presented to Parliament resulting in the River Lee Navigation Act 1738 (12 Geo. 2. c. 32). While recognising the right of the New River Company to extract water, it also enshrined the rights of the millers and bargemen. To resolve a problem where the New River works had blocked the Manifold Ditch, and boats had been forced to use the mill stream to Ware Mill, the mill was bought by the company, and the associated lock became an official right of way. The previous administration by commissioners was replaced by a body of trustees, which it was hoped would be better able to manage the navigation. Although at least two flash locks were built, including one to assist passage past the mill at Broxbourne, there was still friction between the bargemen and the millers, since the use of a flash lock tended to lower the water level above it, to the detriment of the mill. In 1765, the trustees therefore asked John Smeaton to assess the navigation and make recommendations for its improvement.

River Lee Navigation Act 1767
- Act of Parliament
- Parliament of Great Britain
- Long title: An Act for improving the Navigation of the River Lee, from the Town of Hertford, to the River Thames and for extending the said Navigation to the Flood Gates belonging to the Town Mill in the said Town of Hertford.
- Citation: 7 Geo. 3. c. 51
- Territorial extent: Great Britain

Dates
- Royal assent: 29 June 1767
- Commencement: 11 November 1766
Other legislation
Amended by	Lee Navigation Improvement Act 1805; Lee Navigation Improvement Act 1850; Lee Conservancy Act 1868; Lee Conservancy Act 1938
Relates to	River Lee Navigation Act 1738; River Lee Navigation Act 1779

Status: Amended

Text of statute as originally enacted

Smeaton made a survey of the river and produced a report in 1766, in which he recorded that there were 18 staunches at the time, with a lock at Ware and tidal gates at Bow. He recommended that the staunches should be replaced by pound locks, and that several new cuts should be made. These recommendations formed the basis for a parliamentary bill, which was opposed by the owners of the Shoreditch to Enfield turnpike road, the West Ham waterworks and the Waltham Abbey Royal Gunpowder Mills, who were all concerned that their rights would be affected. However, the trustees were granted an act, the River Lee Navigation Act 1767 (7 Geo. 3. c. 51), on 29 June and appointed Thomas Yeoman to oversee the work at their first meeting held two days later.

The act authorised the construction of several new stretches of canal, including the Edmonton Cut from Flanders Weir at Chingford to the mill stream at Walthamstow, the Hackney Cut from Lea Bridge to Old Ford, and the Limehouse Cut to bypass the tight bends of Bow Creek near the River Thames. Yeoman was also responsible for setting out towing paths, designing 35 roving bridges, and construction of lock gates. For the Limehouse Cut, Yeoman proposed a cut from Bow tidal gates to Dingley's Wharf at Limehouse, which would shorten the distance to London considerably, since it would avoid the long passage around the Isle of Dogs. Mr Dingley, owner of the wharf and a trustee, was awarded part of the contract, and the cut was expected to open on 2 July 1770, but some brickwork failed and had to be repaired. A bridge collapsed in December, but traffic soon developed, and the cut had to be widened to allow barges to pass one another along its entire length. The widening was completed on 1 September 1777.

River Lee Navigation Act 1779
- Act of Parliament
- Parliament of Great Britain
- Long title: An Act for preserving the Navigation of the River Lee, in the Counties of Hertford, Essex and Middlesex.
- Citation: 19 Geo. 3. c. 58
- Territorial extent: Great Britain

Dates
- Royal assent: 31 May 1779
- Commencement: 7 June 1779 (Note: Section 1. 7 days after the Monday following the passing of the act.)
Other legislation
Amended by	Lee Navigation Improvement Act 1805; Lee Conservancy Act 1868
Relates to	River Lee Navigation Act 1738

Status: Amended

Text of statute as originally enacted

The trustees decided to finance the work with a loan, and advertisements appeared in the London Gazette and other newspapers, indicating that they wished to raise £35,000. The response was huge, with £161,500 being offered, and subscribers were chosen by ballot. Yeoman was overworked, and Edward Rubie was appointed to assist him in February 1769. New cuts and pound locks were opened at Waltham Abbey, Edmonton and Hackney in 1769. In total, 11 miles (18 km) of new cuts were constructed, with 12 new locks. Some on the locks, such as Homerton Lock and Pickett's Lock, were built on new sections, while others, such as Stanstead Lock, replaced an existing flash-lock. The works were completed to a tight schedule, and with most of it finished, Yeoman resigned in July 1771, although the reasons for his resignation were not recorded.

=== Development ===
Lee Navigation Improvement Act 1805
- Act of Parliament
- Parliament of the United Kingdom
- Long title: An Act for the better Preservation, and further Improvement, of the Navigation of the River Lee, in the Counties of Hertford, Essex and Middlesex.
- Citation: 45 Geo. 3. c. lxix
- Territorial extent: United Kingdom

Dates
- Royal assent: 27 June 1805
Other legislation
Amends	River Lee Navigation Act 1767; River Lee Navigation Act 1779

Status: Current legislation

Lee Navigation Improvement Act 1850
- Act of Parliament
- Parliament of the United Kingdom
- Long title: An Act to alter and amend the Acts relating to the Navigation of the River Lee in the Counties of Hertford, Essex, and Middlesex; and to enable the Trustees further to improve the Navigation and to dispose of the surplus Water; and for other Purposes.
- Citation: 13 & 14 Vict. c. cix

Dates
- Royal assent: 14 August 1850
Other legislation
Amends	River Lee Navigation Act 1738; River Lee Navigation Act 1767

Text of statute as originally enacted

River Lee Water Act 1855
- Act of Parliament
- Parliament of the United Kingdom
- Long title: An Act for transferring Part of the Property and Powers of the Trustees of the River Lee; and for the Amendment of the Acts of the New River Company, the East London Waterworks Company, and the said Trustees; and for other Purposes.
- Citation: 18 & 19 Vict. c. cxcvi

Dates
- Royal assent: 14 August 1855

Text of statute as originally enacted

Lee Conservancy Act 1868
- Act of Parliament
- Parliament of the United Kingdom
- Long title: An Act to make better Provision for the Preservation and Improvement of the River Lee and its Tributaries; and for other Purposes.
- Citation: 31 & 32 Vict. c. cliv
- Territorial extent: United Kingdom

Dates
- Royal assent: 31 July 1868
Other legislation
Amends	River Lee Navigation Act 1738; River Lee Navigation Act 1767; River Lee Navigation Act 1779
Relates to	Stort Navigation Act 1758; Stort Navigation Act 1766

There were further improvements throughout the 19th century, including the Lee Navigation Improvement Act 1850 (13 & 14 Vict. c. cix) to authorise new lock cuts at Hoddesdon, Carthagena Lock (Broxbourne), Waltham Marsh, Tottenham, Walthamstow, Hackney, Leyton and Bromley-by-Bow and new locks at Hunter's Gate (Bow Bridge) and Old Ford. The River Lee Water Act 1855 (18 & 19 Vict. c. cxcvi) authorised a new lock at Amwell Marsh and the removal of Stanstead Lock. Edmonton Lock was to be removed and Pickett's Lock rebuilt. In 1868 the Lee Conservancy Act 1868 (31 & 32 Vict. c. cliv) formed the Lee Conservancy Board to take over control of the river from the former trustees. They established the Lee Conservancy Police, who policed the Lee until merged with the British Transport Police in 1948.

The Lee Navigation bought the Stort Navigation in 1911, and instituted further improvements, including reconstruction of the locks between Enfield and Hertford, the width being increased from 13 to 16 feet (4.0 to 4.9 m): by the 1930s, 130-ton barges could reach Enfield, and 100-ton barges to Ware and Hertford.

The navigation was nationalised in 1948, and control passed to the British Transport Commission. Where possible the locks from Bow Locks through to Ponder's End Lock were duplicated and mechanised - the only exception being Pickett's Lock. In 1962, the British Transport Commission was wound up, and control passed to the British Waterways Board. Commercial traffic effectively ended in the 1980s.

During the 1950s horse-drawn lighters were still journeying as far as Hertford. By 1980 commercial traffic extended no higher than the Enfield Rolling Mills at Brimsdown, with just one tug, the Vassal, regularly at work on the river. Powered by a 120 hp Gardner diesel engine, she would typically tow a train of two lighters loaded with timber from Bow to Hahn's Wharf at Edmonton. There are efforts currently underway to revive commercial traffic on the canal with a plan to transport rubbish for incineration at the Edmonton Incinerator.

=== Governance ===
Lee Conservancy Act 1874
- Act of Parliament
- Parliament of the United Kingdom
- Long title: An Act for empowering the Lee Conservancy Board to execute further Works for the improvement of their navigation; and for amending the Acts relating to the Lee; and for other purposes.
- Citation: 37 & 38 Vict. c. xcvi

Dates
- Royal assent: 16 July 1874

Lee Conservancy Act 1900
- Act of Parliament
- Parliament of the United Kingdom
- Long title: An Act to alter the constitution and amend and extend the statutory powers of the Lee Conservancy Board.
- Citation: 63 & 64 Vict. c. cxvii

Dates
- Royal assent: 30 July 1900

Text of statute as originally enacted

Lee Conservancy Act 1921
- Act of Parliament
- Parliament of the United Kingdom
- Long title: An Act to increase the tolls and charges to be demanded by the Lee Conservancy Board and the sums payable to them by the Metropolitan Water Board to enlarge the powers of the Lee Conservancy Board and for other purposes.
- Citation: 11 & 12 Geo. 5. c. lxxviii

Dates
- Royal assent: 17 August 1921

Lee Conservancy Catchment Board Act 1936
- Act of Parliament
- Parliament of the United Kingdom
- Long title: An Act to confer further powers on the Lee Conservancy Catchment Board and the Lee Conservancy Board to amend section 80 of the Land Drainage Act 1930 and for other purposes.
- Citation: 26 Geo. 5 & 1 Edw. 8. c. lxviii

Dates
- Royal assent: 14 July 1936

Text of statute as originally enacted

With the passing of the Land Drainage Act 1930 (20 & 21 Geo. 5. c. 44), the Lee Conservancy area was treated as a special case, with details laid out in section 80 of that act. The Lee Conservancy Catchment Board was created, which inherited some of the powers conferred by the Lee Conservancy Acts, dating from 1870 to 1921, and gave it additional powers in common with other catchment boards, the most important of which was that they could levy rates on county councils and county borough councils throughout their catchment area, to fund drainage works. The members of the catchment board consisted of all the members of the Lee Conservancy Board, together with six additional members. The board were given additional powers, enabling them to hold land without a licence in mortmain, as a result of the Lee Conservancy Catchment Board Act 1936 (26 Geo. 5 & 1 Edw. 8. c. lxviii). Further change occurred on 1 January 1948, as a result of the Transport Act 1947 (10 & 11 Geo. 6. c. 49). Some of the functions of the conservancy board were taken over by the British Transport Commission, when most of the operational canals and waterways were nationalised, and the board was then disbanded. However, where the board had responsibilities for water supply, fisheries, the control of pollution and land drainage, these functions were transferred to the Lee Conservancy Catchment Board. This was authorised by the Lee Conservancy Catchment Board (Additional Functions) Regulations 1947 (SR&O 1947/2797).

The River Boards Act 1948 (11 & 12 Geo. 6. c. 32) saw the formation of river boards to replace catchment boards throughout England and Wales, but the Lee Conservancy Catchment Board, together with the Thames Conservancy Catchment Board, were excluded from this. River boards were replaced by river authorities as a result of the Water Resources Act 1963 (c. 38), but again the Lee Conservancy was treated as a special case. It made provision that the responsibilities for water conservation outlined in that act could be given to the Lee Conservancy Catchment Board by the joint decision of the Minister of Housing and Local Government, the Minister of Agriculture, Fisheries and Food, and the Minister of Transport. Those provisions, somewhat modified for the special circumstances of the catchment area, were conferred by the Lee Conservancy Catchment Board (New Functions of River Authorities) Order 1965 (SI 1965/701).

The transport functions of the waterway were transferred to the British Waterways Board, subsequently known as British Waterways, from 1 January 1963, as part of the breakup of the British Transport Commission authorised by the Transport Act 1962. These functions are now managed by the Canal and River Trust, a charitable organisation that took over the role of British Waterways from 2 July 2012. There have been three further changes in the environmental management of the waterway. The Water Act 1973 (c. 37) abolished river authorities, and created ten regional water authorities. The Lee Conservancy was no longer a special case, and became part of the Thames Water Authority. This structure lasted until the passing of the Water Act 1989 (c. 15), which split the water authorities apart, privatising the water supply, sewerage and sewage disposal functions, and transferring the environmental management of river systems including the Lee to the National Rivers Authority. The final change was a result of the Environment Act 1995 (c. 25), which abolished the National Rivers Authority and replaced it by the Environment Agency.

== Recreation ==
Much of the Lee Navigation is within Lee Valley Park, a multi-county regional park and open space preserve. Local jurisdictions also maintain parks on the canals in Lee Valley Park.

The Lea Valley Walk, a 50-mile (80 km) long-distance public walking path and bicycle trail from the headwaters to the Thames confluence, follows the canal towpaths in the Lee Navigation section.

== Photo gallery ==
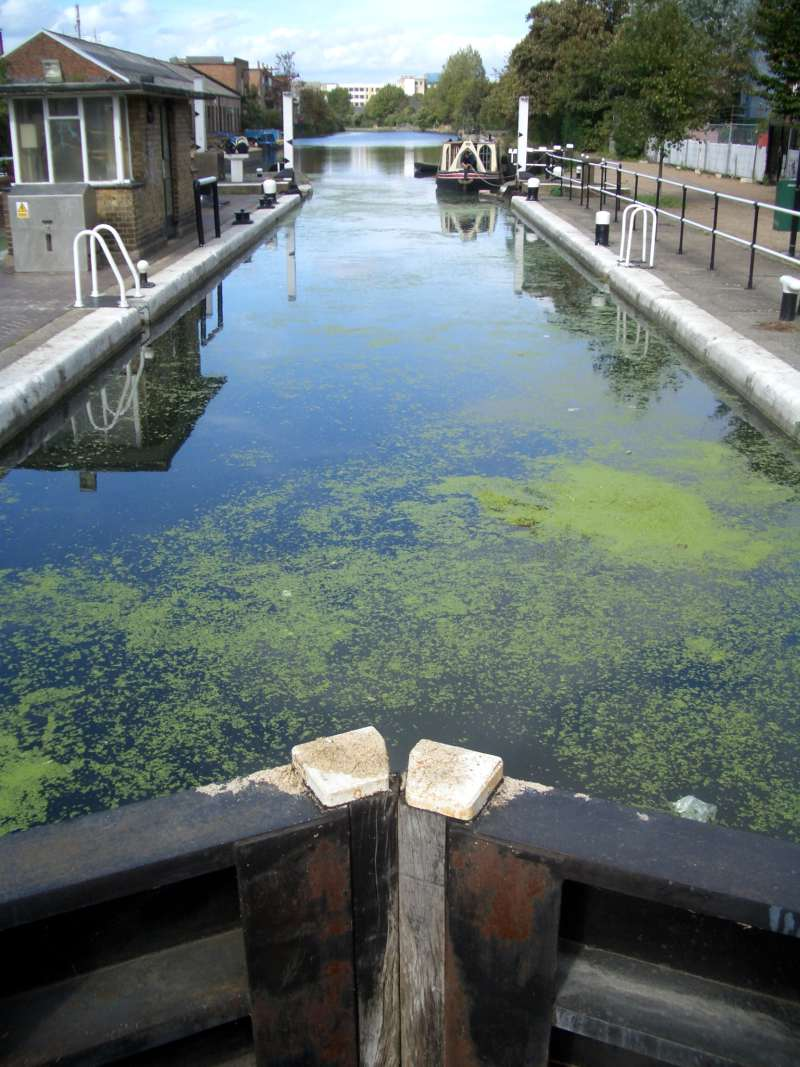
Old Ford Lock, Lee Navigation

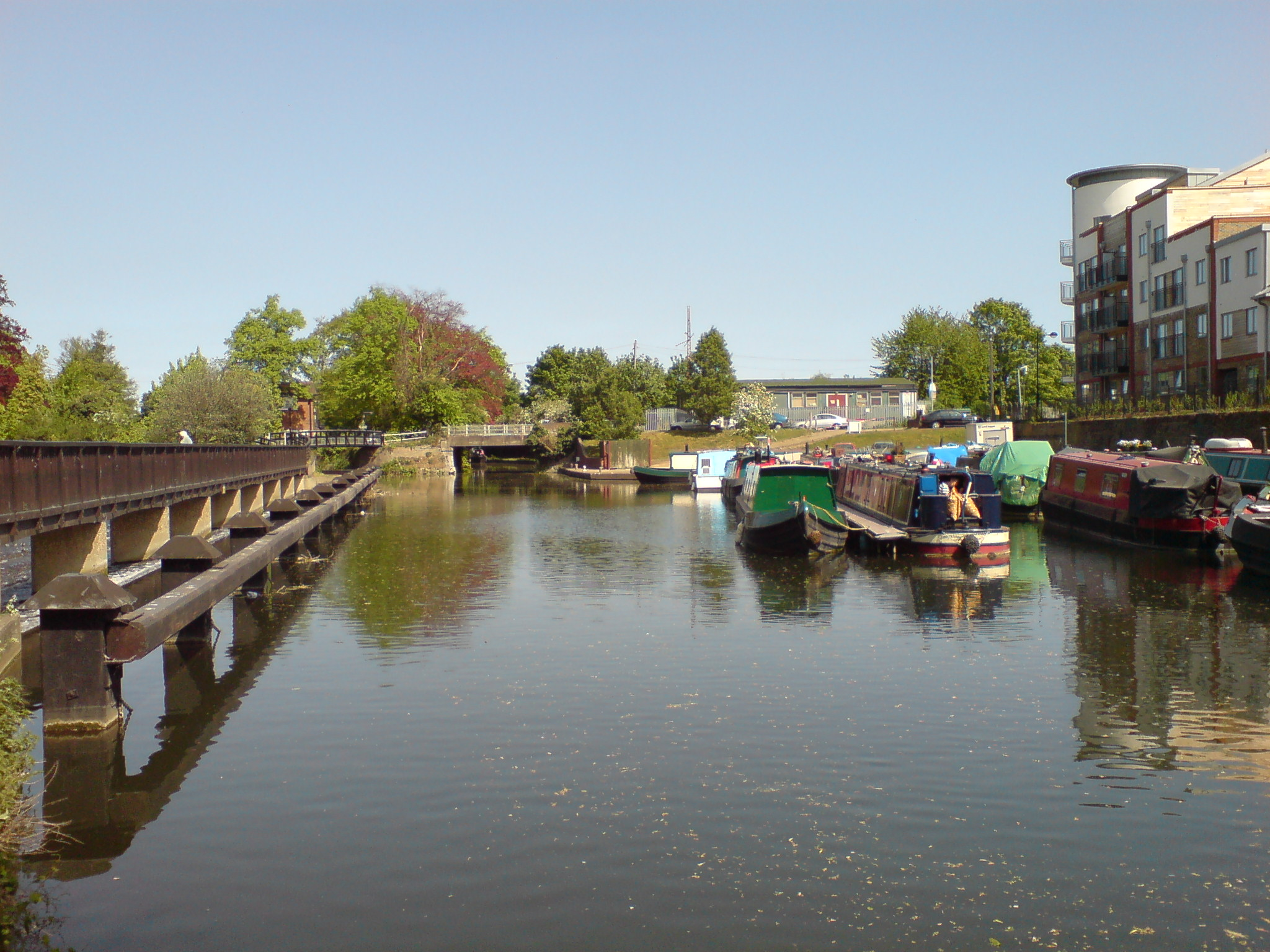
Hertford Basin, the first marina on the Navigation

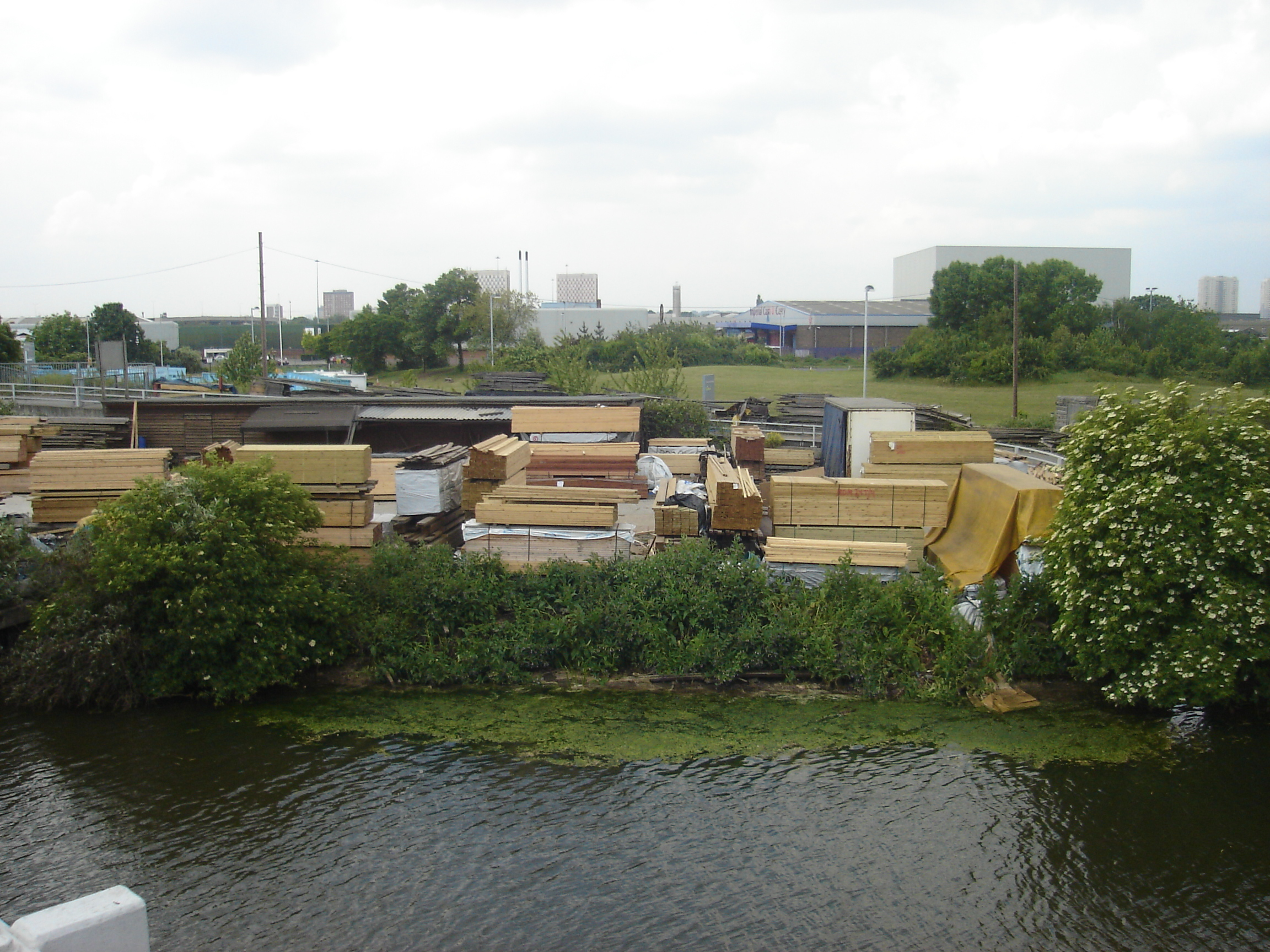
Looking west from the North Circular Road at Edmonton

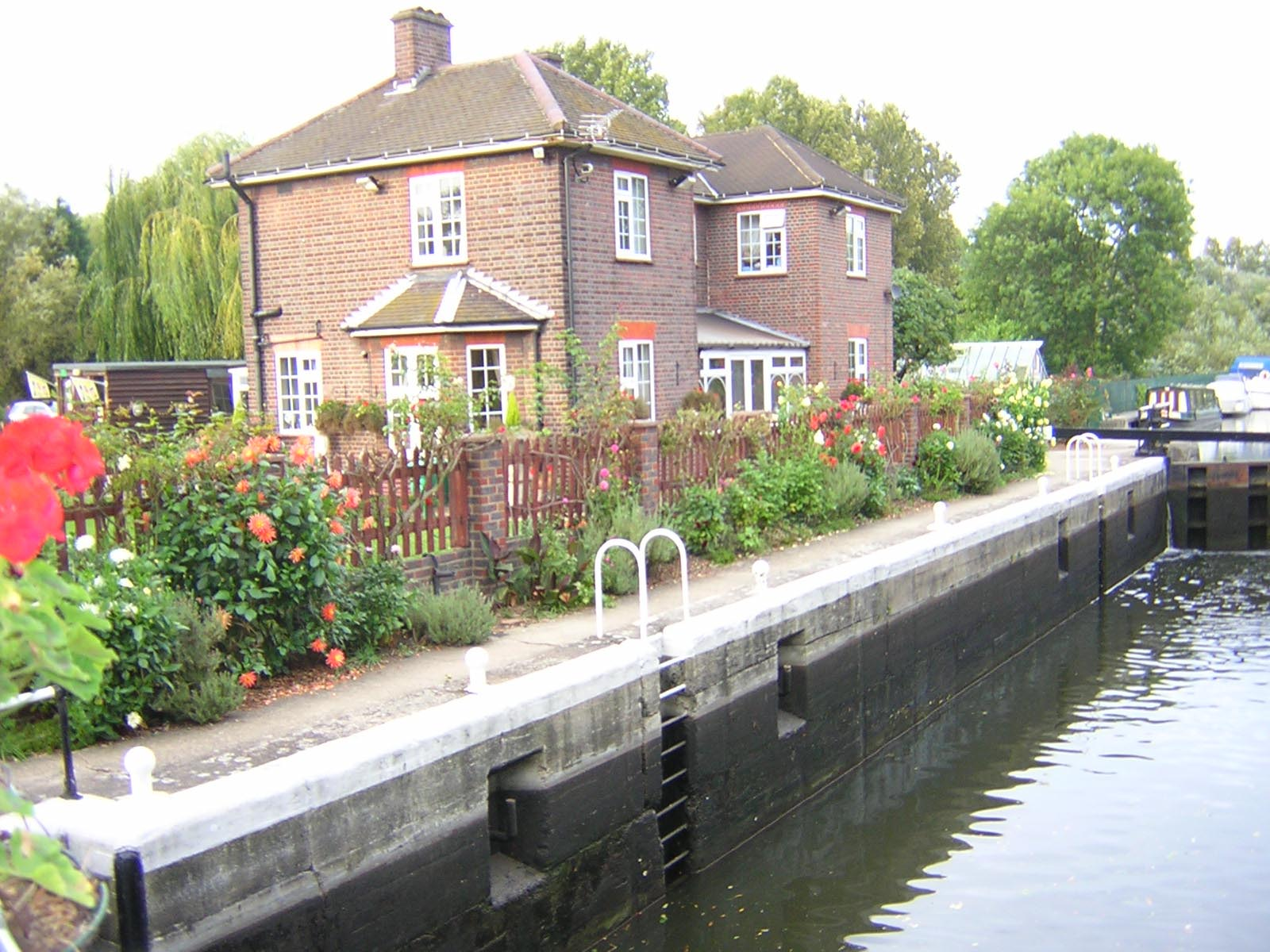
Carthagena Lock

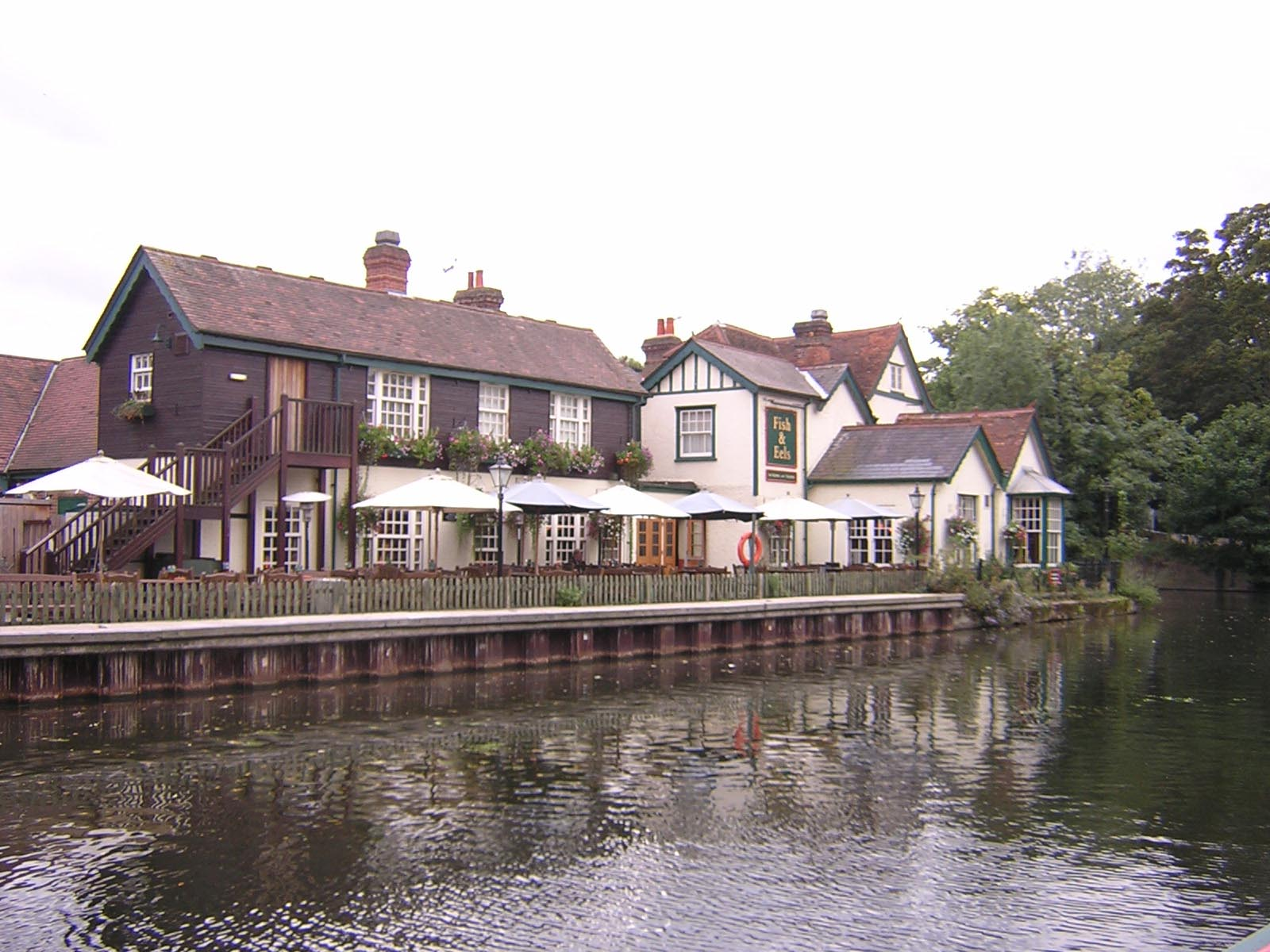
Fish and Eels pub at Dobbs Weir

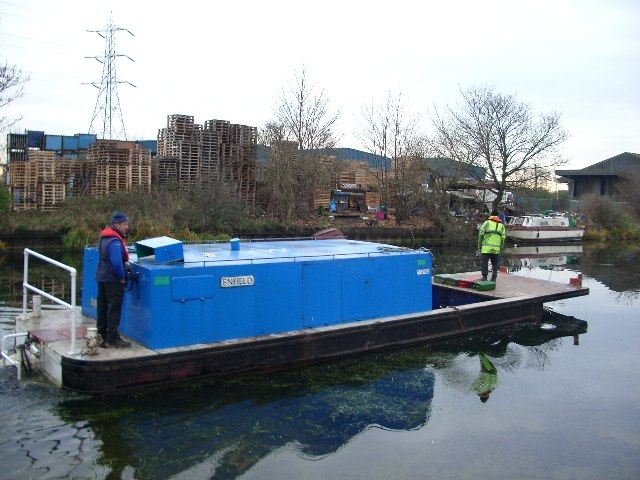
Workboat Enfield on the river at Tottenham

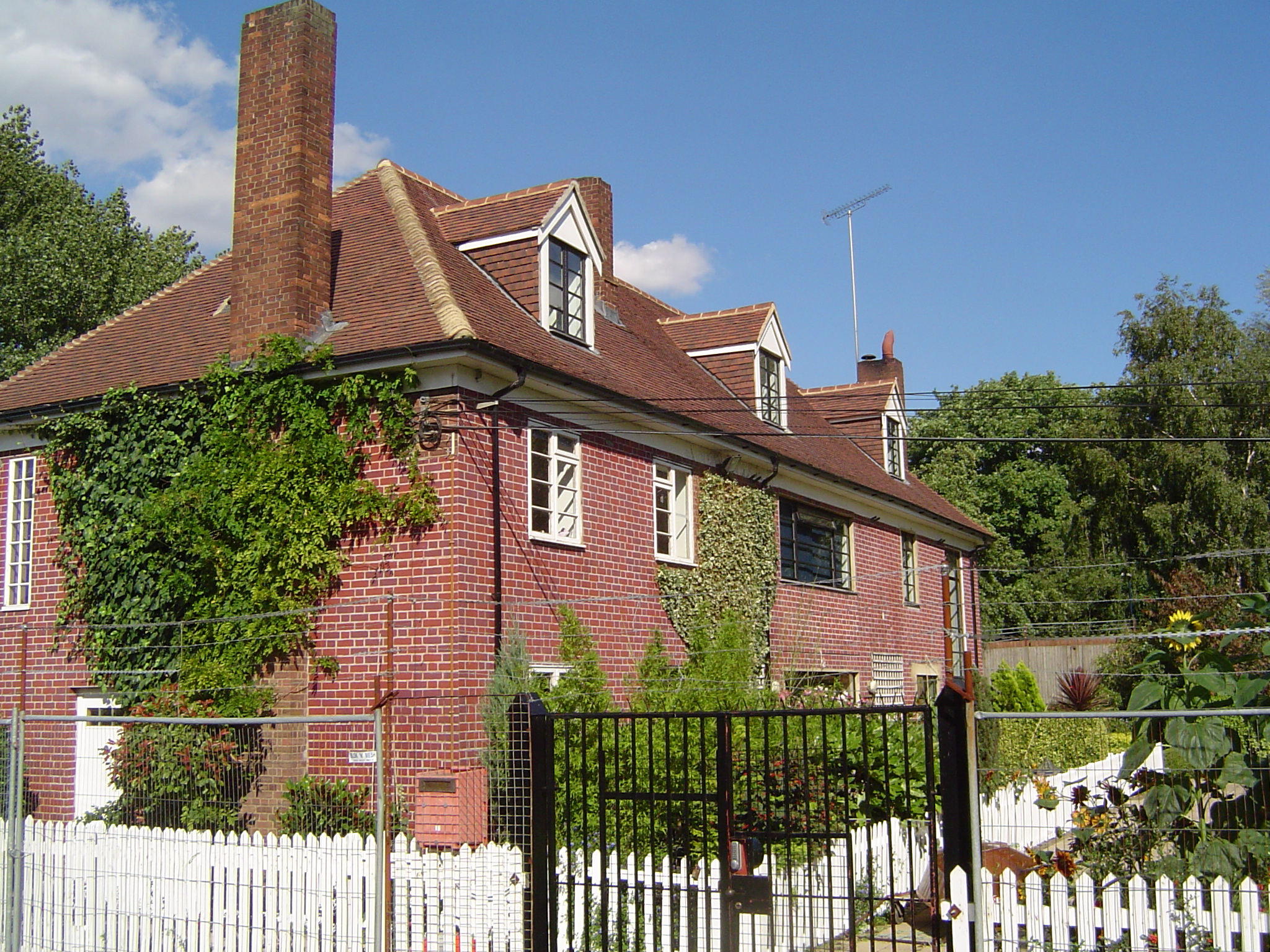
Lock-keeper's cottages at Old Ford Lock, used for filming The Big Breakfast

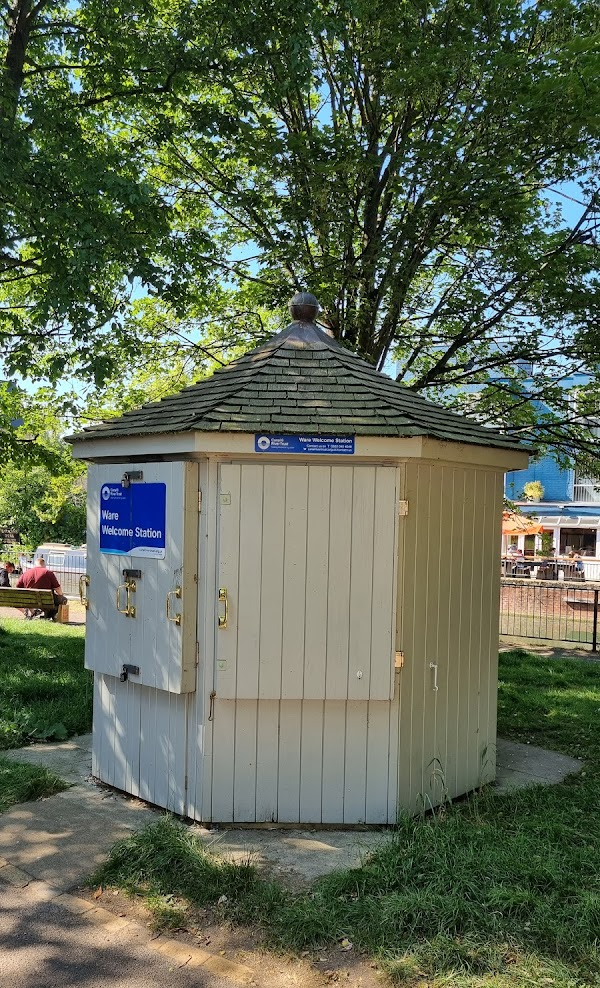
Ware Welcome Station

== See also ==
- Bow Back Rivers
- Canals of Great Britain
- History of the British canal system

== Bibliography ==
- Boyes, John; Russell, Ronald (1977). The Canals of Eastern England. David & Charles. ISBN 978-0-7153-7415-3.
- Cumberlidge, Jane (2009). Inland Waterways of Great Britain (8th Ed.). Imray Laurie Norie and Wilson. ISBN 978-1-84623-010-3.
- Nicholson (2006). Nicholson Guides Vol 1: Grand Union, Oxford & the South East. HarperCollins. ISBN 978-0-00-721109-8.
- Paget-Tomlinson, Edward (1994). The Illustrated History of Canal & River Navigations. Sheffield Academic Press. ISBN 978-1-85075-277-6.
- Priestley, Joseph (1831). Historical Account of the Navigable Rivers, Canals and Railways of Great Britain. Longman, Rees, Orme, Brown & Green.
- Wisdom, A S (1966). Land Drainage. London: Sweet & Maxwell.
