= RMS Amazon (1851) =

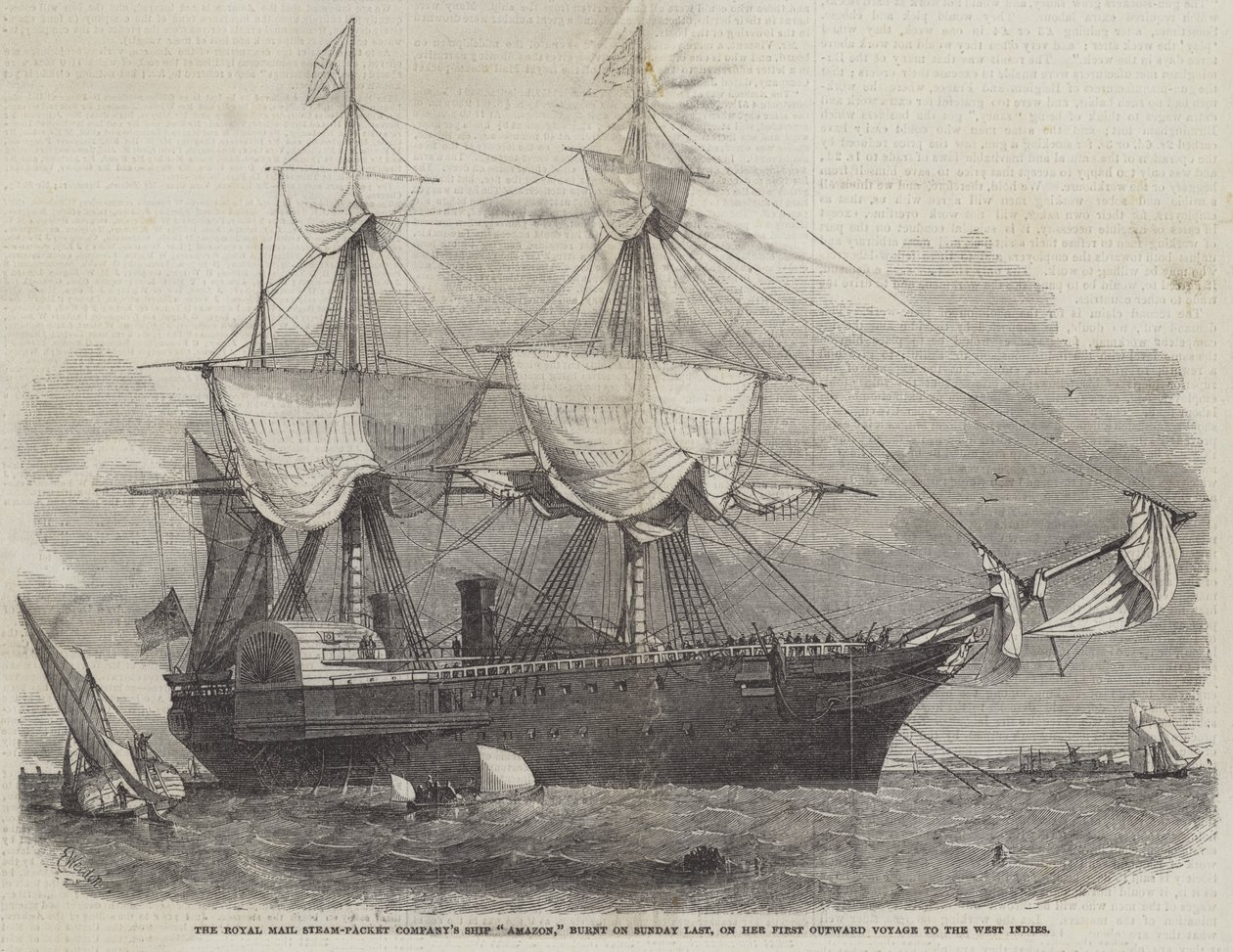
- Amazon from the Illustrated London News

History

United Kingdom
- Name: Amazon
- Namesake: Amazon River
- Owner: Royal Mail Steam Packet Co
- Operator: Royal Mail Steam Packet Co
- Builder: R & H Green, Blackwall Yard, London
- Laid down: 1 September 1850
- Launched: 28 June 1851
- Maiden voyage: 2 January 1852
- Home port: Southampton
- Fate: Burnt and sank 4 January 1852

General characteristics
- Tonnage: 2,256 NRT
- Length: 300 ft (91 m)
- Beam: 42 ft (13 m) over paddle boxes
- Draught: 21 ft 7 in (6.58 m)
- Installed power: 800 hp at 14 rpm
- Propulsion: 2 × side-lever steam engines; 2 × paddle wheels, 40 ft 8 in (12.40 m) diameter
- Sail plan: 3-masted barque
- Speed: service speed 11 knots (20 km/h); top speed 15 knots (28 km/h)
- Capacity: 50 passengers
- Crew: 112
- Notes: sister ships: Demerara, Magdalena, Orinoco & Paraná

RMS Amazon was a wooden three-masted barque, paddle steamer and Royal Mail Ship. She was the first of 5 sister ships commissioned by the Royal Mail Steam Packet Company to serve RMSP's routes between Southampton and the Caribbean.

== Building ==
By 1851 iron-hulled screw ships were increasingly common, but RMSP conservatively continued to buy new paddle steamers. The Admiralty supervised those UK merchant ships contracted to carry mail, and insisted that they all have wooden hulls. Therefore, RMSP ordered that Amazon and her four sisters be wooden-hulled paddle steamers.

R & H Green built Amazon at Blackwall Yard, London. Her keel was laid on 1 September 1850 at and she was launched on 28 June 1851. Seaward and Capel of Limehouse built her engines. They were a pair of side-lever steam engines, developing 800 hp at 14 revolutions per minute. No figure for her gross register tonnage is recorded, but it was in the order of 2,900 GRT.

== Maiden voyage and loss ==
Amazon was the first of the five sister ships to enter service. In December 1851 she reached Southampton to prepare for her maiden voyage. She carried 1,000 tons of coal for her bunkers and loaded several hundred tons of cargo. Her strong room contained 500 bottles of mercury for use in the production of mining explosive in Mexico and £20,000-worth of specie. The mercury was worth over £5,000 and the total value of the cargo was estimated at £100,000. In common with many ships undertaking trans-oceanic voyages in that era, the ship carried livestock on deck and bales of hay to feed them.

On Friday, 2 January, Amazon, commanded by Captain William Symons, loaded mail, embarked 50 passengers and late that day she sailed for the Caribbean. In the next 24 hours she twice hove to as her engine bearings overheated. She entered the Bay of Biscay and at about 12:40 on Sunday, 4 January, smoke was sighted rising from a hatch ahead of her forward funnel. Captain Symons and his chief officer, Roberts, were quickly on deck and organised crewmen with buckets and a hose to fight the fire. Men started to move hay away from the fire, but after they had moved only two bales all the remainder caught alight.

Symons ordered that the engines be stopped and boats launched. The mail boat was lowered containing 25 people. In a heavy sea and with the ship still under way the boat was swamped and all of its occupants drowned. The fire was now such that the engine room could not be reached and so the engines could not be stopped. Symons turned the ship so that the wind was at her stern. This helped to slow the spread of fire toward her stern, but also maximised her speed and thus the difficulty in launching her boats.

The pinnace was lowered. Before its occupants could unfasten its forward tackle the heavy sea swung it around and tossed its occupants in the water. A second cutter was lowered but swamped by a wave that washed away all but two of its occupants. The starboard lifeboat was successfully launched and 16 people got away in it. The dinghy was successfully launched carrying five people.

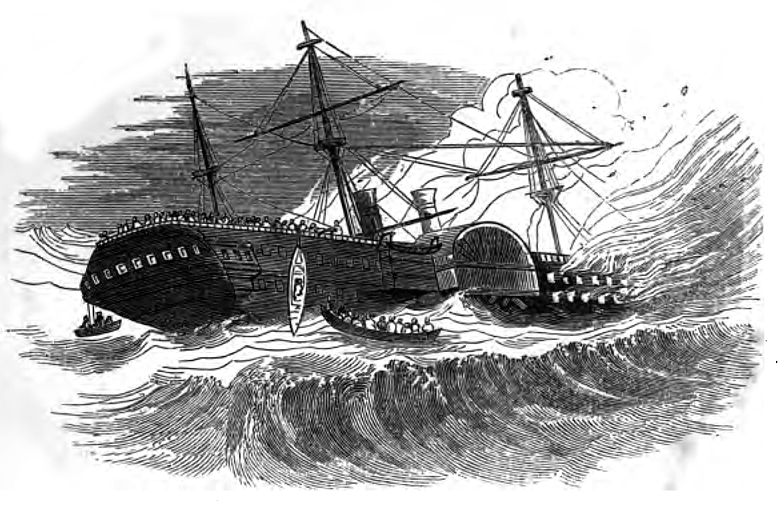
Contemporary engraving of the loss of Amazon

The fire spread out of control. The starboard lifeboat rescued the five occupants of the dinghy and tried to approach the ship to rescue more people, but came in danger of being swamped and so abandoned the attempt. Amazon was still under way, rolling in the heavy sea while Symons and his crew still tried to keep her course steady.

By 04:00 the fire brought down the ship's foremast and mainmast. At 05:00 her magazine exploded and her mizzen mast was brought down as the deck collapsed . Her funnels glowed red-hot and about half an hour later she sank about 110 miles (180 km) west-south-west of the Isles of Scilly.

At 10:30 the brig Marsden, bound from London to North Carolina, rescued the 21 survivors in the starboard lifeboat and landed them at Plymouth. At first these were feared to be the only survivors. However, the Dutch galliot Gertruida rescued seven passengers, 17 crew members and a foreman from Seaward and Capel and landed them at Brest on 5 January. A second Dutch ship, Hellechina, rescued 13 survivors and transferred them to the HM Revenue cutter Royal Charlotte, which landed them at Plymouth on 16 January. The steamship Harbinger also rescued some passengers and crew.

At the beginning of February a section of Amazon's timbers, partly charred by the fire, drifted ashore at Falmouth.

== Deaths and aftermath ==
Reports of the total number of dead vary from 105 to 115. They included the popular travel writer and novelist Elliot Warburton, and the French novelist Gabriel Ferry. A national appeal, championed by Queen Victoria and Prince Albert, raised money for widows, orphans and survivors.

An enquiry into the ship's loss failed to establish a cause of the fire. The repeated overheating of the engine bearings has been cited as suggesting that the fire may have started in the engine room. However, such overheating might also be expected to cause the engines to seize, whereas they continued to run as the fire spread.

Whatever the cause, the fire caused the Admiralty to reconsider its insistence on wooden hulls for mail ships. The next ship that RMSP ordered, RMS Atrato, was built with an iron hull.

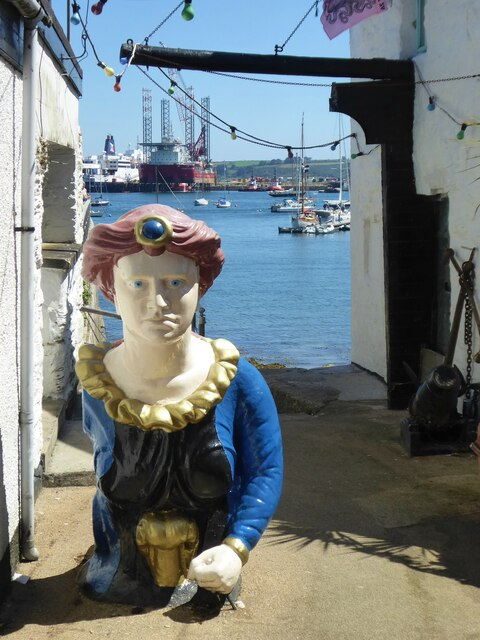
The Amazon's figurehead in Upton Slip, Falmouth

== Sources ==
- The Lost Steamer: A History of the Amazon. London: Partridge and Oakey. 1852.
- Sorrow on the Sea: An Account of the Loss of the Steam-ship "Amazon", by Fire. London: J Mason. 1852.
- The Annual Register, Or, A View of the History and Politics of the Year 1852. London: JG & F Rivington. 1853. pp. 462–469.
- Nicol, Stuart (2001a). MacQueen's Legacy; A History of the Royal Mail Line. Vol. One. Brimscombe Port and Charleston, SC: Tempus Publishing. pp. 45, 66, 67, 73, 76, 189. ISBN 0-7524-2118-2.
- Nicol, Stuart (2001b). MacQueen's Legacy; Ships of the Royal Mail Line. Vol. Two. Brimscombe Port and Charleston, SC: Tempus Publishing. pp. 53, 55, 85. ISBN 0-7524-2119-0.
- Shaw, Frank H (1930). "VI: When the Amazon Took Fire". Full Fathom Five: A Book of Famous Shipwrecks. New York: Junior Literary Guild. pp. 120–140.
