= Thames Ironworks and Shipbuilding Company =

Former shipbuilders in London

Coordinates: 51°30′34″N 0°0′32.8″E

Thames Ironworks and Shipbuilding Company, Limited
- Industry: Shipbuilding
- Founded: 1837
- Defunct: 1912
- Fate: Defunct
- Headquarters: London

Warships being built at the eastern site in or slightly before 1902

The Thames Ironworks and Shipbuilding Company, Limited was a shipyard and iron works straddling the mouth of Bow Creek at its confluence with the River Thames, at Leamouth Wharf (often referred to as Blackwall) on the west side and at Canning Town on the east side. Its main activity was shipbuilding, but it also diversified into civil engineering, marine engines, cranes, electrical engineering and motor cars.

The company notably produced iron work for Isambard Kingdom Brunel's Royal Albert Bridge over the Tamar in the 1850s, and the world's first all-iron warship, HMS Warrior, launched in 1860.

== History ==
=== 1837–46 ===
The company originated in 1837 as the Ditchburn and Mare Shipbuilding Company, founded by shipwright Thomas J. Ditchburn and the engineer and naval architect Charles John Mare. Originally located at Deptford, after a fire destroyed their yard the company moved to Orchard Place in 1838, between the East India Dock Basin and Bow Creek in Blackwall. There they took over the premises of the defunct shipbuilders William and Benjamin Wallis.

The firm did well and within a few years occupied three sites covering an area of over 14 acres (5.7 ha).

Ditchburn and Mare were among the first builders of iron ships in the area; their partnership commenced with the construction of small paddle steamers of between 50 and 100 tons, before progressing to cross-Channel vessels and by 1840 were building ships of more than 300 tons. The company's early customers included the Iron Steamboat Company and the London and Blackwall Railway Company, several paddle steamers being constructed for the latter, including the Meteor and the Prince of Wales, which operated between Gravesend and the company's station on Brunswick Wharf.

In this period the company was also awarded several contracts by the Admiralty, including HMS Recruit (a 12-gun brig) which was one of the first iron warships built. They also constructed the P & O Company's steamers Ariel and Erin, along with the paddle steamer Preussischer Adler for Prussia.

=== 1847–56 ===
Thomas Ditchburn retired in 1847 and the business was carried on by Charles Mare, under the name of C.J. Mare and Company. He was joined by naval architect James Ash, who later began his own shipyard at Cubitt Town.

From 1847 the company grew considerably and Mare purchased land in Canning Town on the Essex side of the River Lea, a ferry service being established between the two sites.

Mare constructed a yard with furnaces and rolling mills that could construct vessels of 4,000 tons; because of the narrowness of the spit at the mouth of the River Lea, the Orchard Place site was limited to the construction of vessels of less than 1,000 tons. In 1853 the company launched the SS Himalaya for the Peninsular and Oriental Steam Navigation Company, briefly the world's largest passenger ship before becoming a naval troopship.

In 1855, the company which by now had more than 3000 employees, was threatened with closure following Mare's bankruptcy. It is thought by some that his financial difficulties arose from delays in payment for completed work or, alternatively, that the company had miscalculated the cost of building vessels for the Royal Navy. The business did not lack orders, having in hand six contracts for gunboats and the contract for Westminster Bridge (which was built in 1862).

=== 1857–1912 ===
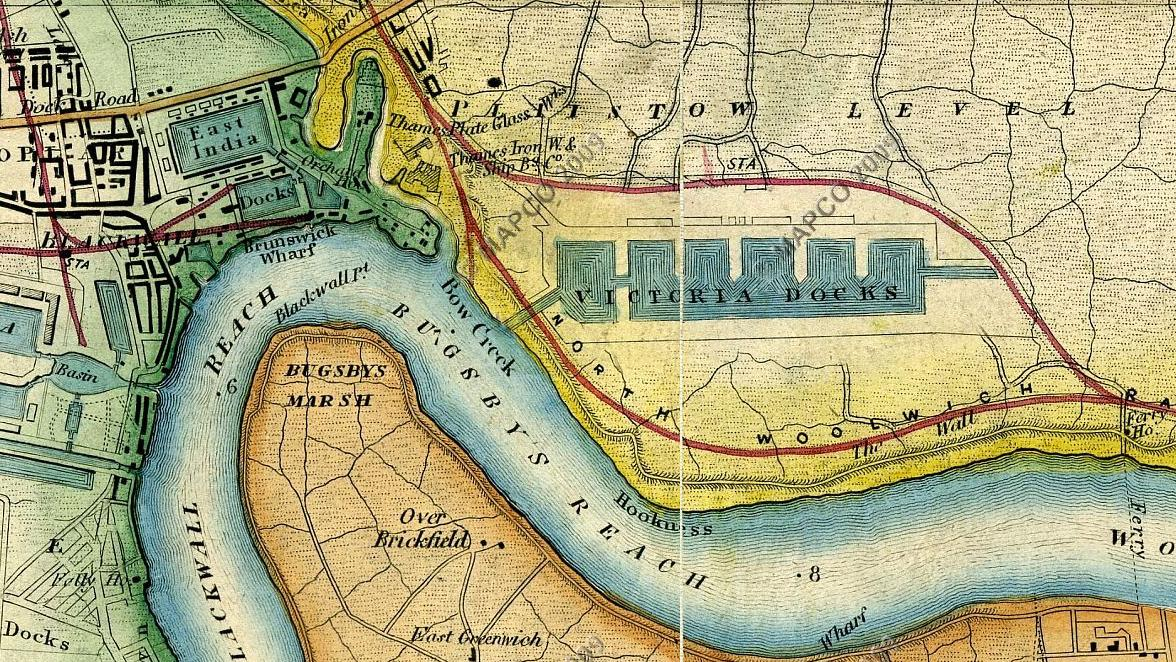
Map circa 1872, showing Victoria Docks, now Royal Victoria Dock, Bow Creek and the Thames Ironworks and Shipbuilding Company

The company's chief creditors moved to keep the company in operation, and two employees, Joseph Westwood and Robert Baillie were appointed works managers. The main figure in saving the company was Peter Rolt, Mare's father-in-law and Conservative MP for Greenwich. Rolt was also a timber merchant and a descendant of the Pett shipbuilding family. He was supported in the venture by another company director, Lord Alan Spencer-Churchill.

Rolt took control of the company's assets and in 1857 transferred them to a new limited company, named the Thames Ironworks and Shipbuilding and Engineering Company Ltd.. It had a capital of £100,000 in 20 shares of £5000 each, five of which were held by Rolt who was the main shareholder and also chairman of the board.

The new company was the largest shipbuilder on the Thames, its premises described by the Mechanics' Magazine in 1861 as "Leviathan Workshops". Large scale Ordnance Survey maps of the 1860s show the yard occupying a large triangular site in a right-angled bend on the east bank of Bow Creek with the railway to Thames Wharf on the third side, and with a smaller site on the west bank. The main yard had a quay 1,050 feet (320m) long. To the south-east the yard occupied the north bank of the Thames east of Bow Creek, with two slips giving direct access to the main river. Today the site is crossed by the A1020 Lower Lea Crossing and the Docklands Light Railway south of Canning Town station.

By 1863 the company had the capacity to build 25,000 tons of warships and 10,000 tons of mail steamers simultaneously. One of its first Admiralty contracts was for HMS Warrior, launched in 1860, at the time the world's largest warship and the first iron-hulled armoured frigate. HMS Minotaur followed in 1863, 400 feet (120 m) long and 10,690 tons displacement.

Work on vessels such as Minotaur was performed on the Canning Town side of the Lea, and this is where the Thames Ironworks expanded from less than 10 acres (4.0 ha) in 1856 to 30 acres (12 ha) by 1891. While the old site at Orchard Place was still the company's official address until 1909, its presence there was minimal, by the late 1860s the company having only a 5 acres (2.0 ha) site there.

General shipbuilding on the Thames came under great pressure due to the cost advantages of northern yards with closer supplies of coal and iron, and many yards closed following the 1866 financial crisis. Of the survivors, those like the Thames Ironworks were specialised in warships and liners.

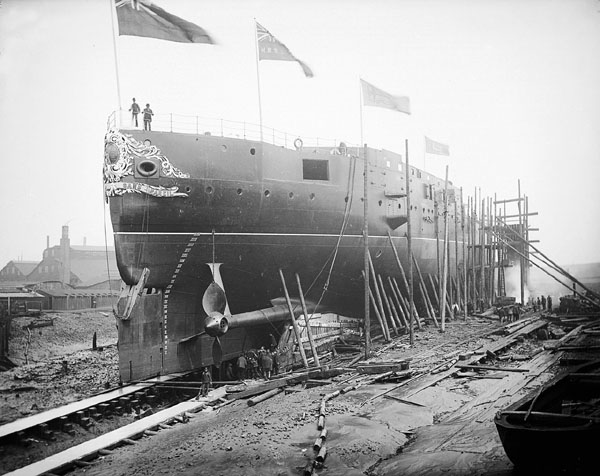
Stern view of HMS Sans Pareil ready for launching

Following the success of HMS Warrior and HMS Minotaur, orders were placed by navies all over the world, and vessels were built for Denmark, Greece, Portugal, Russia, Spain and the Ottoman Empire. The yard also built the Prussian Navy's first iron-hulled warship, the SMS König Wilhelm in 1868 and the cruiser Afonso de Albuquerque for Portugal in 1884. A multitude of mostly small warships were also built for the Romanian Navy, most notably the brig Mircea. Also notable was the tiny minelayer Alexandru cel Bun. The Iron Works also produced for the Romanian Navy a class of three small 45-ton gunboats, a class of three medium 116-ton gunboats and a class of eight 50-ton torpedo boats.

In the 1890s philanthropist Arnold Hills became the managing director. He had originally joined the board of directors in 1880 at the age of 23. Hills was one of the first business directors voluntarily to introduce an eight-hour day for his workers at a time when 10- and 12-hour shifts were more common in industrial work.

In 1895 Hills helped to set up a football club for the Works' employees, Thames Ironworks F.C. and within their first two years they had entered the FA Cup and the London League. As a result of the committee's desire to employ professional players, the Thames Ironworks F.C. was wound up in June 1900 and West Ham United F.C. was formed a month later.

Merged with the engine builder John Penn and Sons in 1899 as the Thames Iron Works, Shipbuilding and Engineering Co.

During its lifetime the yard produced 144 warships and numerous other vessels. In 1911 Hills petitioned Winston Churchill, then First Lord of the Admiralty, regarding the lack of new orders. He was unsuccessful, and the yard was forced to shut in 1912. Within two years the United Kingdom was at war with the German Empire, with the yard's last major ship taking part in the Battle of Jutland. Kotri Bridge in Pakistan Sindh province was also constructed in between 1897 and 1912.

The premises of the Thames Iron Works and Shipbuilding Company, Greenwich, were subsequently acquired in 1915, by the Royal Flying Corps (created in 1912) for the storage of aeroplanes.

== Notable products ==
- In the 1850s the company produced iron work for I.K. Brunel's Royal Albert Bridge over the Tamar at Saltash.
- In 1897 to 1912 the company made the ironworks of Kotri Bridge, Sindh Province of Pakistan.
- HMS Warrior, launched in 1860, the world's first all-iron warship. When completed in October 1861, Warrior was the largest, fastest, most heavily armed and most heavily armoured warship in the world.
- In the 1890s the yard built two of the six British-built battleships that formed the main Japanese battle line in the Russo-Japanese War of 1904–1905.
- The launch of HMS Albion in 1898 was marred by an accident when several observers died following a bridge collapse.
- The last major warship built by the yard, HMS Thunderer (22,500 tons), was launched in 1911.

== Ships ==
- HMS Trident, Royal Navy, 1845 (Ditchburn & Mare)
- HMS Recruit, Royal Navy, 1846, iron brig.
- DS Rigi, 1847. In continuous service on Lake Lucerne (Switzerland) until 1952. Since being decommissioned, she has been on display at the Swiss Transport Museum (Verkehrshaus).
- PS Vladimir, 1848 (C J Mare), "Russian War Steamer"
- Argo, 1853, first steamship to circumnavigate the world.
- SS Himalaya, 1853 (C J Mare), for Peninsular and Oriental Steam Navigation Company, later HMS Himalaya, Royal Navy.
- HMS Warrior, Royal Navy, 1860
- Yavari and Yapura, Peruvian Navy, 1862, exported in sections for assembly on Lake Titicaca.
- Mahmudiye, Ottoman Navy, 1863
- HMS Minotaur, Royal Navy, 1863
- RUS Pervenetz, Imperial Russian Navy, 1863
- HMS Valiant, Royal Navy, 1863
- Victoria, frigate, 1865
- SNS Vitoria, Spanish Navy, 1865
- HMS Serapis, Royal Navy troopship, 1866
- Anglia, 1866, iron paddle tug.
- SMS König Wilhelm, 1869, Prussian Navy
- Avnillah, Ottoman Navy, 1869
- Feth-i Bülend, Ottoman Navy, 1870
- HMS Magdala, Royal Navy, 1870
- Hamidiye, Ottoman Navy, 1872, purchased by the Royal Navy as HMS Superb
- Mesudiye, Ottoman Navy, 1872
- PS Castalia, English Channel Steamship Company, 1874
- Mindello, Portuguese Navy, 1875
- Rainha De Portugal, Portuguese Navy, 1875
- Vasco da Gama, Portuguese Navy, 1876
- Fox 1877, iron tug
- Canada 1880, Screw Tug
- HMS Linnet, Royal Navy, 1880
- NRP Afonso de Albuquerque, Portuguese Navy, 1884
- HMS Benbow, Royal Navy, 1885
- HMS Sans Pareil, Royal Navy, 1887
- HMS Blenheim Royal Navy, 1890
- SS Robin, Arthur Ponsonby, 1890
- HMS Grafton, Royal Navy, 1892
- HMS Theseus, Royal Navy, 1892
- Battleship IJN Fuji, 1896
- Battleship Shikishima, 1898
- HMS Albion, Royal Navy, 1898
- HMS Cornwallis, Royal Navy, 1901
- HMS Duncan, Royal Navy, 1901
- Cromer Lifeboat Louisa Heartwell ON 495, RNLI 1902
- HMS Black Prince, Royal Navy, 1904
- J C Madge, RNLI, Sheringham lifeboat, 1904,
- HMS Nautilus, Royal Navy, 1910, later named HMS Grampus
- HMS Thunderer, Royal Navy, 1911

== Legacy ==
=== Engineering Department building ===
The turreted Engineering Department building located behind some of the slipways remained a major Thameside landmark for decades after the Ironworks closed. It was still in good condition in 1939, and survived the war despite the area - the Tidal Basin area of Canning Town - being of the very worst bomber areas of the country, losing 85% of its housing. The building had become dilapidated by 1947 and was eventually replaced by a warehouse.

=== Archaeology ===
Part of the company's Limmo Peninsula site was excavated during the construction of Crossrail in 2012.

=== Links to West Ham United Football Club ===
Employees at the Thames Ironworks formed a works football team, called Thames Ironworks Football Club. This club was later renamed West Ham United, whose emblem of the crossed hammers represents the large riveting hammers used in the shipbuilding trade. West Ham are also known as "The Hammers" for this reason.

While the media and the general football world commonly refer to the club as The Hammers, the club's own supporters have always referred to their team as 'The Irons', which again comes from the link with Thames Ironworks. The chant 'Come on you Irons' is heard on every match day at West Ham.

The shape of the 16th evolution of the club badge, launched after club moved to the Olympic Stadium in 2016, is a representation of the cross-section of the bow of HMS Warrior, the first iron clad battleship, built by the Thames Ironworks in 1860.
