= Orchard House Yard =

Coordinates: 51.5087°N 0.0067°E

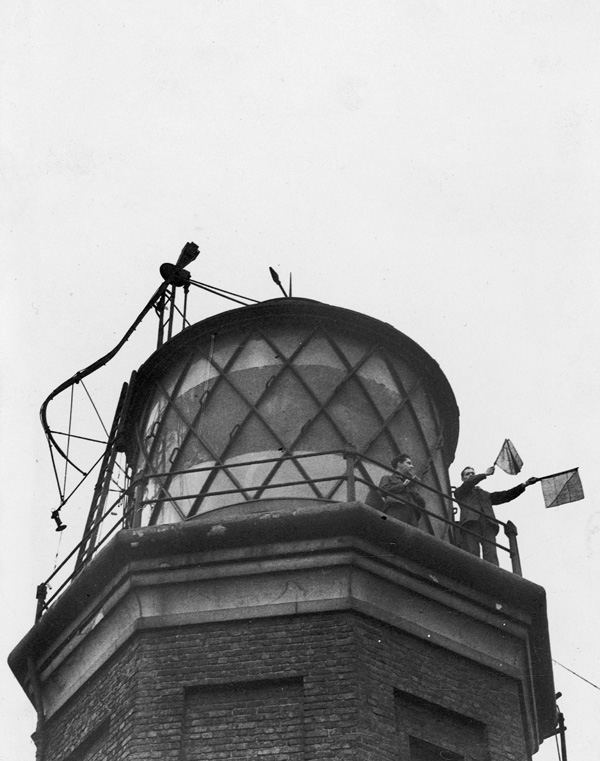
Lighthouse personnel being trained at Orchard Yard c. 1950

Orchard House Yard (known as Orchard Yard and Hercules Wharf) was an English shipbuilding yard located at Leamouth, on the River Lea at Bow Creek . Forming part of the Orchard House estate, a number of shipbuilders occupied the site over time:

- 1840 Ditchburn & Mare
- 1846 C J Mare & Co
- 1857 Thames Ironworks and Shipbuilding Company Ltd
- 1873(pre) Joseph Spencer Watson
- 1889 W J Jolly
- 1890 H H Mackenzie/Mackenzie, MacAlpine & Co.

The only known surviving vessel built at the yard is SS Robin, a 300-ton steam-powered coaster which is part of the National Historic Fleet and the last of her type still in existence. She was built at Orchard House Yard in 1890 by Mackenzie and is currently located a short distance away in the Royal Victoria Dock.

== See also ==
- Canals of the United Kingdom
- History of the British canal system
