= SS Robin =

Steam ship

Coordinates: 51.5058°N 0.0292°E

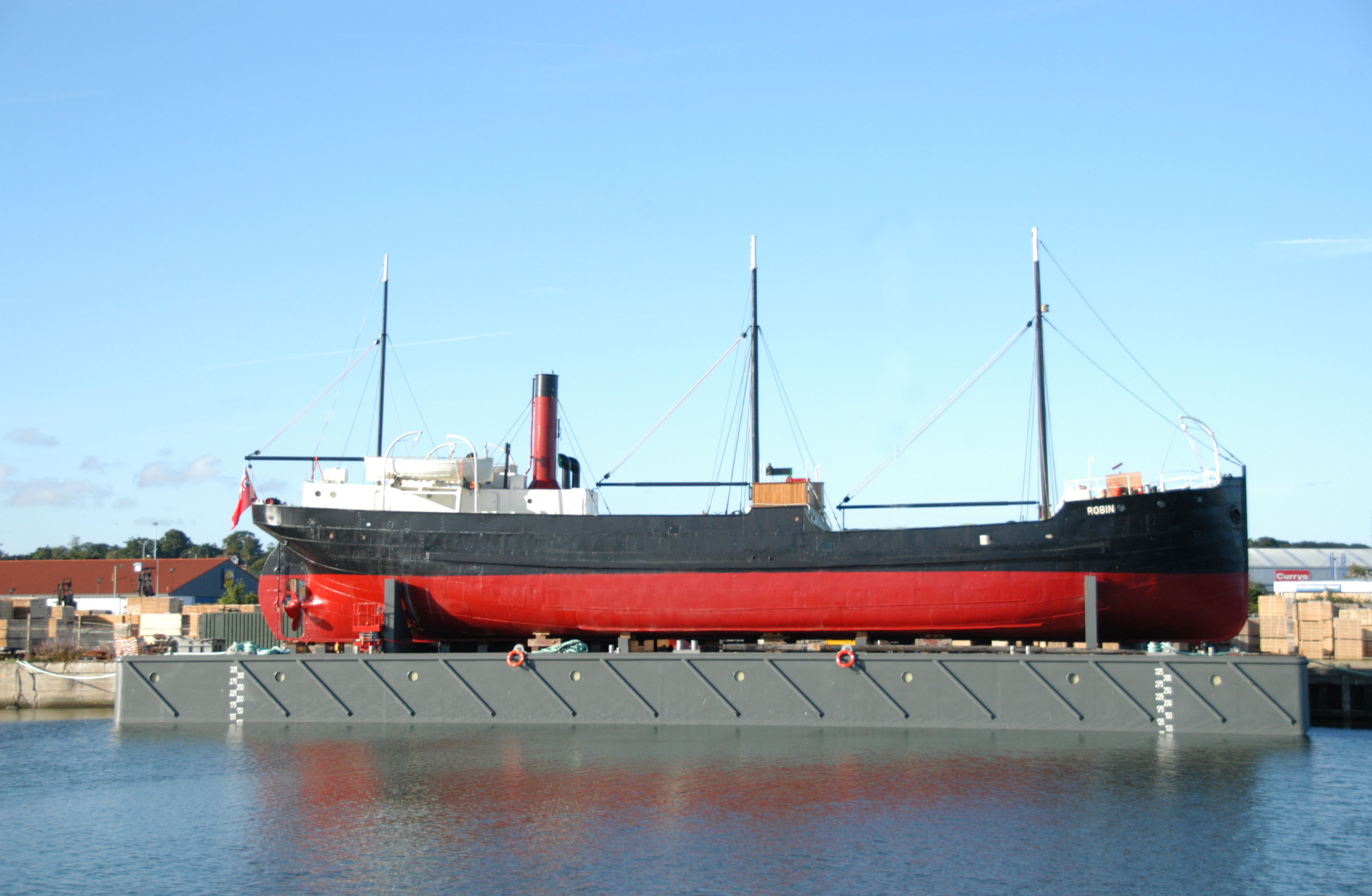
- SS Robin September 2010, ready to leave Lowestoft

History

United Kingdom
- Name: Robin (1890–1900)
- Owner: Robert Thomson, London (1890–1890); Arthur Ponsonby, Newport Mon. (1890–1892); Alexander Blackater (The Robin Steamship Co Ltd), Glasgow (1892–1900)
- Builder: Mackenzie, MacAlpine & Co, then Robert Thomson, Orchard House Yard, Blackwall, London
- Yard number: 26
- Launched: 16 September 1890
- Completed: November 1890
- Identification: IMO number: 5222287
- Fate: Sold to Spain 1900

Spain
- Name: Maria (1900–1974)
- Owner: Blanco Hermanos y Compañia of Ribadesella (1900–1913); Hijos de Angel Perez y Compañia of Santander (1913–1965); Eduardo de la Sota Poveda of Bilbao (1965–1974)
- Fate: Purchased for preservation 1974

United Kingdom
- Name: Robin (1974–present)
- Owner: The Maritime Trust Corp Ltd, London (1974–2002); SS Robin Trust (2002–)
- Status: Museum ship

General characteristics
- Tonnage: 366 GRT (later 342 GRT) 550 DWT
- Length: 143 ft (44 m) loa
- Beam: 22.9 ft (7.0 m)
- Depth: 11 ft (3.4 m)
- Installed power: Triple expansion steam engine 152 ihp (113 kW)
- Propulsion: Single screw
- Sail plan: Originally schooner rigged
- Speed: 9 knots (17 km/h; 10 mph)

SS Robin is a 350 gross registered ton (GRT) steam coaster, a class of steamship designed for carrying bulk and general cargoes in coastal waters, and the oldest complete example in the world. One of a pair of coasters built in Bow Creek, London in 1890, the ship was built for British owners, but spent most of her long working life on the Spanish coast as Maria.

In 1974, she was purchased for restoration as Robin and is listed by National Historic Ships as part of the National Historic Fleet (the nautical equivalent of a Grade I listed Building). She is situated at Trinity Buoy Wharf in east London, opening as the SS Robin museum, theatre and educational centre in 2014.

== Specification ==
As built, Robin was 143 feet (44 m) long, her beam is 23 feet (7.0 m), her depth is 12.2 feet (3.7 m) and her tonnage is 366 GRT. She carried about 450 tons of cargo.

The engine is a three-cylinder triple expansion steam engine, developing 152 indicated horsepower (113 kW), and made in 1890 by Gourlay Brothers & Co of Dundee, Scotland. Her maximum speed was 9 knots (17 km/h; 10 mph).

In Lloyd's Register she was described as a "steel screw 3-masted schooner", and had indeed been provided with sails for all three masts when first built.

== History ==
Robin was ordered from Mackenzie, MacAlpine & Co of Orchard House Yard, Hercules Wharf, Blackwall, London, situated in Bow Creek at the mouth of the River Lea, by London shipowner Robert Thomson, and launched on 16 September 1890. However, she and her sister Rook were completed by Thomson himself, though the reason is unknown. After fitting out in the East India Docks, Robin was towed to Dundee to have her engine, boiler and auxiliary machinery installed by Gourlay Brothers & Co. When completed she was registered in London with Official number 98185 and in the ownership of Arthur Ponsonby of Newport, then in Monmouthshire.

=== 1890 to 1900 ===
On 20 December 1890, Robin commenced her career in the British coastal service at Liverpool, with a crew of 12 signing the Articles for her maiden voyage. As a coaster her range was normally limited to the Home Trade limits (broadly from the Elbe to Brest). However, on her first voyage she went 400 miles (640 km) further, to Bayonne; the owners had to replace the Master's mate with another, who held the correct certificate, until the ship returned to Swansea on 10 January. Her second voyage began at Swansea on 14 January 1891, visiting Rouen, Northfleet on the River Thames, Eastham and Garston on the River Mersey, Plymouth, Deauville, Guernsey, London, Rochester, Newport, Swansea, Cherbourg arriving in Northfleet by 5 April 1891. This would be typical of her trading under the Red Ensign, carrying bulk cargoes of grain, iron ore, scrap steel, pit props, china clay, railway steel, general cargoes of casked and baled goods such as herring barrels, and even granite blocks for the Caledonian Canal. In 1892, Robin was sold to Andrew Forrester Blackater of Glasgow, where she was re-registered.

=== 1900 to 1974 ===
In 1900 Robin was sold and renamed Maria; for the next 74 years she had three different Spanish owners:

- 1900–1913 Blanco Hermanos y Compañia of Ribadesella.
- 1913–1965 Hijos de Angel Perez y Compañia of Santander. During World War I she carried iron slabs for the French government from the foundry at Santiago to Bayonne and Bordeaux, escorted by two destroyers to protect her from German U-boats. From 1935 to 1939 (the Spanish Civil War) the ship was laid up at San Esteban de Pravia.
- 1965–1974 Eduardo de la Sota Poveda of Bilbao, working around Bilbao and the north coast of Spain until 1974, carrying coal for the bunkering of liners.

Until 1965, Maria's structure stayed mainly unchanged; in 1966 she had a major refit with the whaleback (at the stern) and the mizzen mast removed, the foremast and the funnel shortened, and the forecastle extended. The coal-fired furnaces were modified for oil fuel. After this she resumed trading.

=== 1974 to 2002 ===
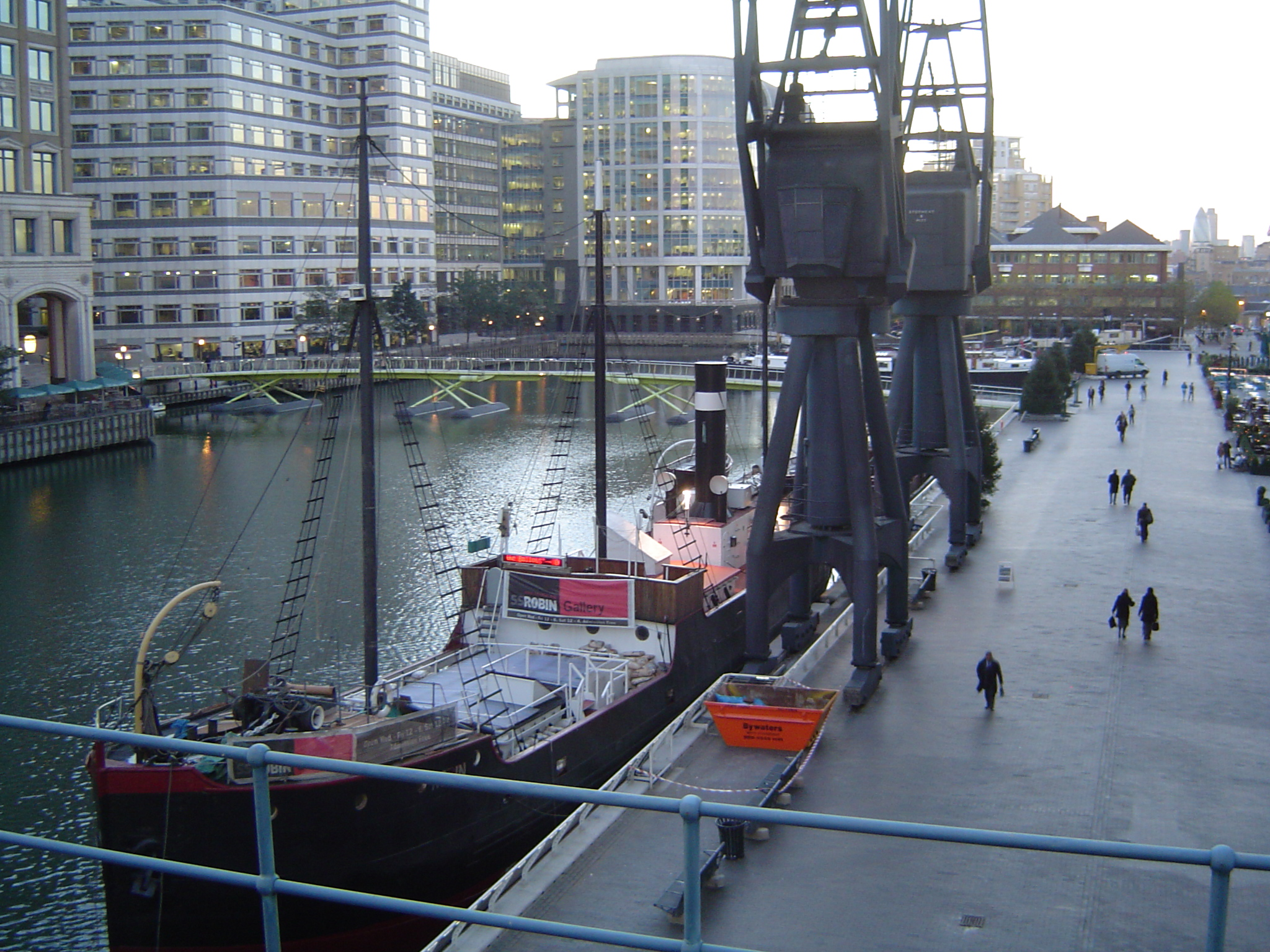
SS Robin, November 2005.

Maria was discovered by the Maritime Trust in 1972. Following an inspection, it was decided that she was worth preserving, and in May 1974 she was purchased, on the brink of being sold to Spanish breakers. In June 1974 she came home to St Katharine Docks under her own steam and was renamed Robin. She was restored at a cost of £250,000, with most work taking place in 1974 and 1975 at the Doust & Co shipyard at Rochester, Kent, and was subsequently moored in St Katharine Docks. She was moved to new moorings in 1991 at West India Quay but fell into disrepair.

In 2000 David and Nishani Kampfner were looking for a unique space to be transformed into an area for innovation and learning. They bought Robin for £1. In 2002, SS Robin Trust was created to bring awareness to the general public about the importance of the ship. With the help of many volunteers they began restoration on this coastal steamer.

=== 2002 to 2008 ===
Crossrail provided SS Robin Trust with a £1.9 million loan to enable her to move to dry dock for restoration works to commence. Before she was able to be moved, her masts, funnel, lifeboats and davits were dismantled and removed by Cutty Sark Enterprises. She was then towed from West India Quay down the Canary Wharf locks to South Quay for temporary mooring. Around this time the Heritage Lottery Fund had also been approved and SS Robin Trust was awarded a grant of just under £1 million.

=== 2008 to 2010 ===
In June 2008, Robin was to undergo her first seaward journey in 35 years from South Quay to Lowestoft for structural restoration using, so far as was practicable, the same craft skills with which she was built in 1890, conserving her Victorian technology. Once at Lowestoft a detailed examination revealed that after 118 years she was now considered too fragile to be able to float again. Initially it was thought that Robin would need a 40% steel replacement, but after the examination it showed that she would need an 80% steel replacement thereby essentially ruining her historical value. These new findings urged SS Robin Trust to find a less destructive approach maintaining Robin. It soon became clear that a pontoon would be the most innovative and least destructive method to keep her floating and to preserve and display her original riveted fabric. It also provided a wealth of more space. In 2010, Robin was lifted by two cranes and placed onto her new pontoon. She was then towed to Tilbury where she was moored for a year.

=== 2010 to present ===
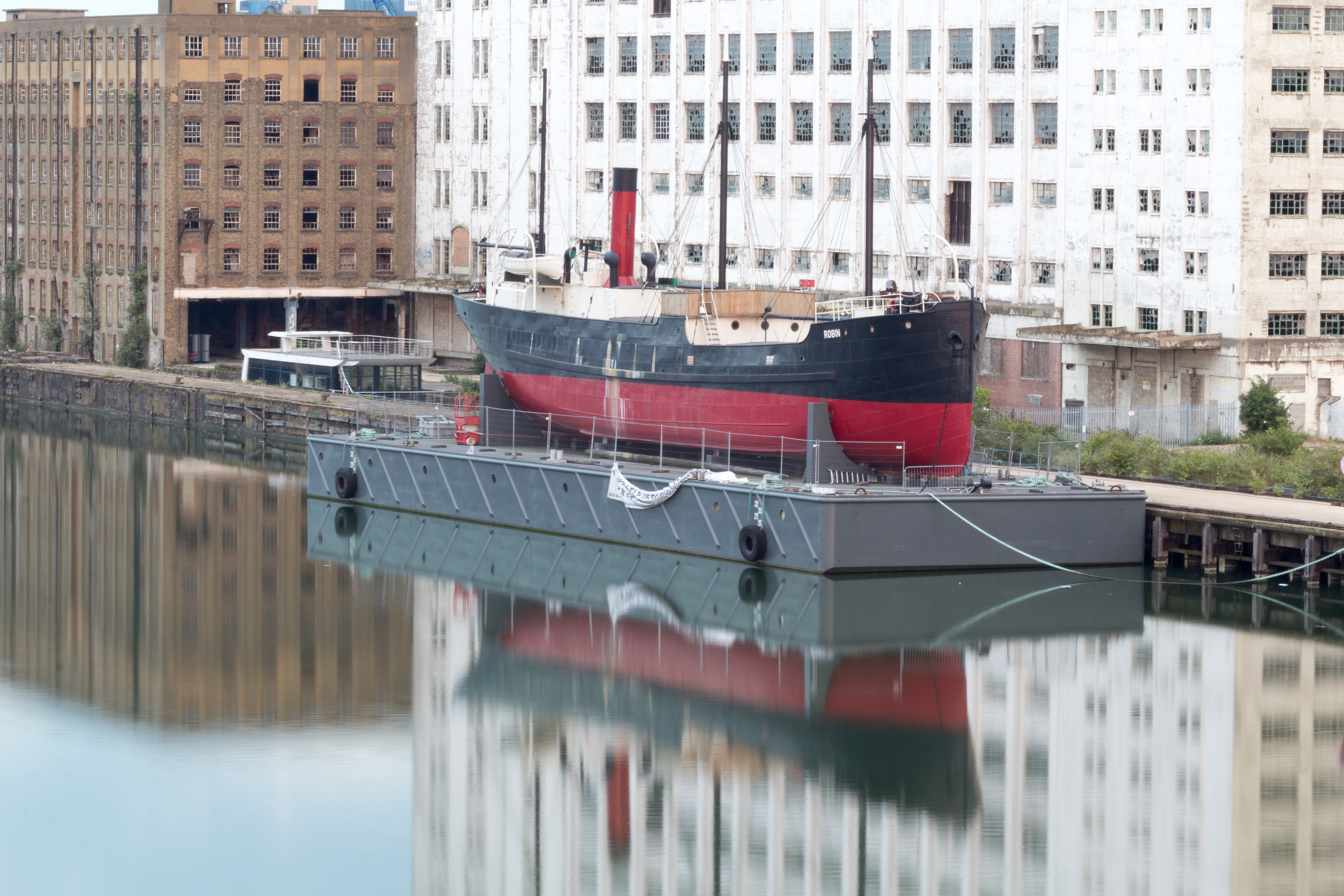
SS Robin, July 2014.

After 3 years of conservation work in Tilbury, in July 2011 Robin returned to east London, where she was originally built, to undergo further internal restoration and preparation before opening as the SS Robin museum, theatre and educational centre in the Royal Victoria Dock in Newham borough in 2014, with the support of a grant of just over £950,000 from the Heritage Lottery Fund.

She was then subsequently moved to the Millennium Mills Dock, where she was temporarily berthed for further restoration and development before reopening to the public, at the western end of the Royal Victoria Dock (close to the London Cable Car), in 2015.

In 2023, she was moved to Trinity Buoy Wharf.

== Arts & Education Centre and Museum ==
In 2002, David and Nishani Kampfner bought Robin and founded the SS Robin Trust as a registered charity (Prince Philip was an honorary member, and Jim Fitzpatrick MP, and Channel 4 news reader Jon Snow are patrons). The Trust converted her into an educational centre and photographic gallery; in this restoration, the original beams, structures, fittings and engine were preserved and restored by her volunteer crew. She operated as a learning centre and photojournalism gallery from 2003, with an extensive programme of exhibitions, talks, seminars and workshops designed to build bridges between communities and interacting with local schools and businesses. The gallery, with a flexible classroom and exhibition area, was accommodated within the original cargo hold.
