= Leamouth Lifting Footbridge =

Pedestrian bridge over Bow Creek

Coordinates: 51.5142°N 0.0068°E

Leamouth Lifting Footbridge, viewed from the southeast

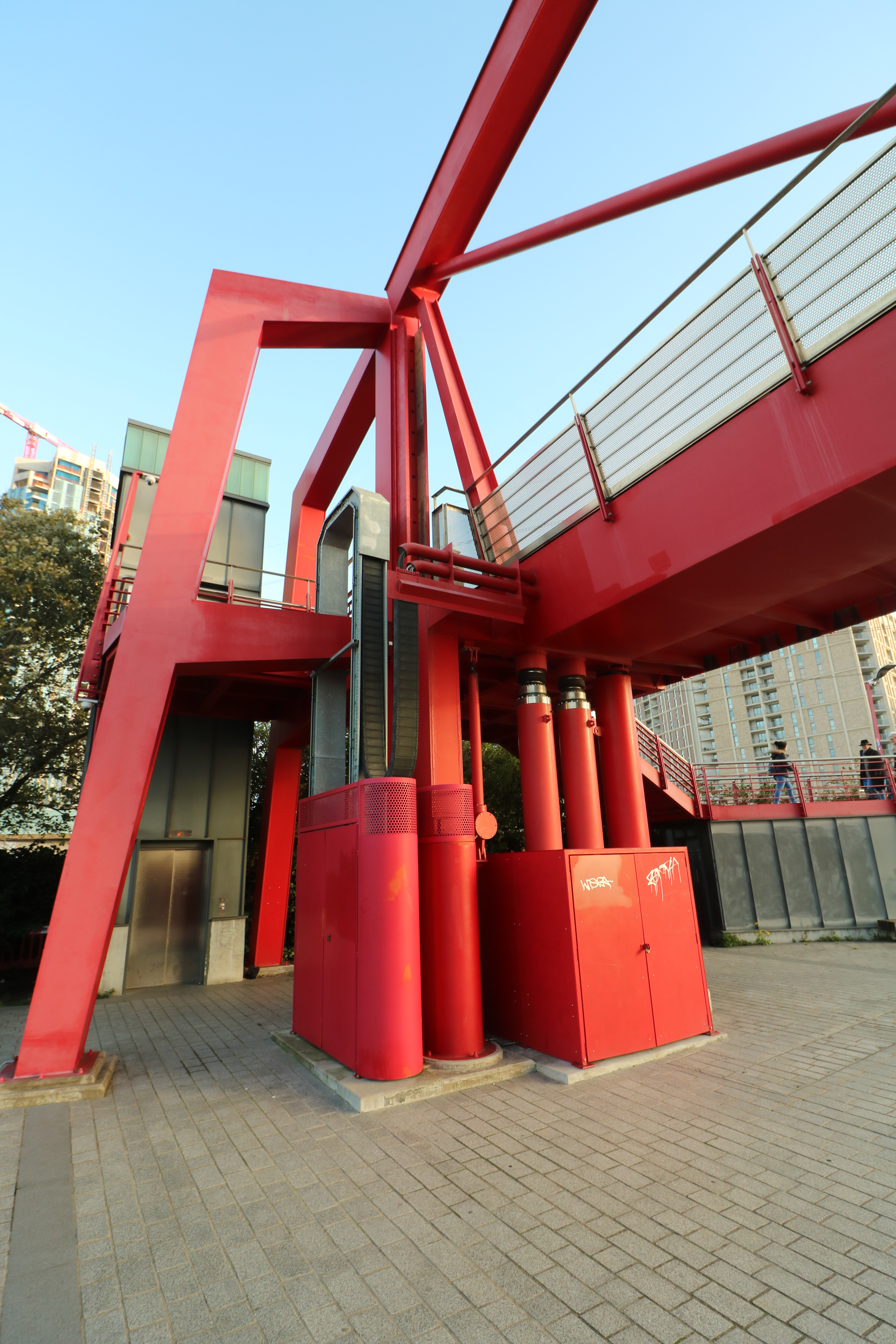
North abutment of the Leamouth Lifting Footbridge, with lifting pistons visible

The Leamouth Lifting Footbridge or Leamouth North Bridge is a steel lifting arch bridge for pedestrians over Bow Creek, the estuary of the River Lea. It connects Leamouth in the London Borough of Tower Hamlets to Canning Town in the London Borough of Newham.

== History ==
Leaside Regeneration set up a design competition, which was won by Whitbybird in or before 2004. The bridge was budgeted at £3.5M and would have a 45m mast, that tilted and lowered the bridge at the north side of the river. The bridge was due for completion in 2007, but in 2005 the funding was withdrawn for the Thames Gateway Delivery Unit.

In 2008 SOM designed a new bridge as part of a master plan for the area, and in 2011 it won the planning.

The bridge was ordered by Ballymore Group. Bridge engineering was done by Davies Maguire, with consulting on the mechanical design by Eadon consulting

In August 2014, the pre-fabrigated bridge was lifted into place.

== Characteristics ==
The bridge can rise 4 metres on hydraulic pistons on both bridge ends.

The bridge headway is 5.2m above MHWS when closed, and 9.4m when opened.
