= Portuguese corvette Afonso de Albuquerque (1884) =

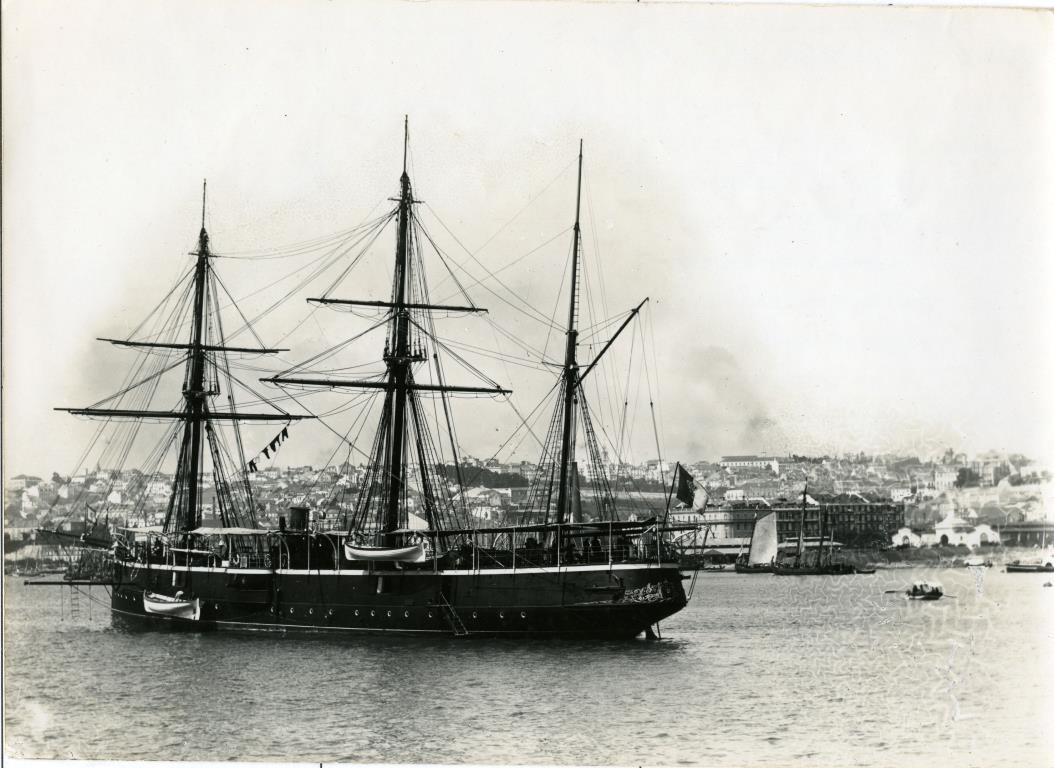

History

Kingdom of Portugal
- Name: Afonso de Albuquerque
- Operator: Portuguese Navy
- Builder: Thames Iron Works
- Launched: 1884

General characteristics
- Type: Sloop or unprotected cruiser
- Displacement: 1,092 t
- Length: 203 ft 6 in (62.03 m)
- Propulsion: 1360 ihp
- Speed: 13.3 knots (24.6 km/h; 15.3 mph)
- Armament: 2 × 6 in./26 cal. gun; 5 × 5 in./25 cal. guns; 2 × 3-pounder guns

Afonso de Albuquerque (also spelled as Afonso d'Albuquerque) was a sloop or small unprotected cruiser of the Portuguese Navy. In Portuguese service, she was classified as "corvette". Launched in 1885, she was named after the 16th-century Portuguese general and governor of India Afonso de Albuquerque. She was decommissioned in 1909.

She was a small colonial warship, larger than most gunboats but weaker than a protected cruiser. The term "sloop" in the steamship era was used by some navies including the Royal Navy for what were essentially large gunboats. The Afonso de Albuquerque resembled, in size and performance, the Spanish unprotected cruisers of the Velasco class, which were used for colonial duties (and the unsuccessful defense of Manila Bay in 1898).

== Bibliography ==
- Gardiner, Robert, ed. (1979). Conway's All the World's Fighting Ships 1860–1905. New York: Mayflower Books. ISBN 0-8317-0302-4.
