= Bow Locks =

Canal lock in London

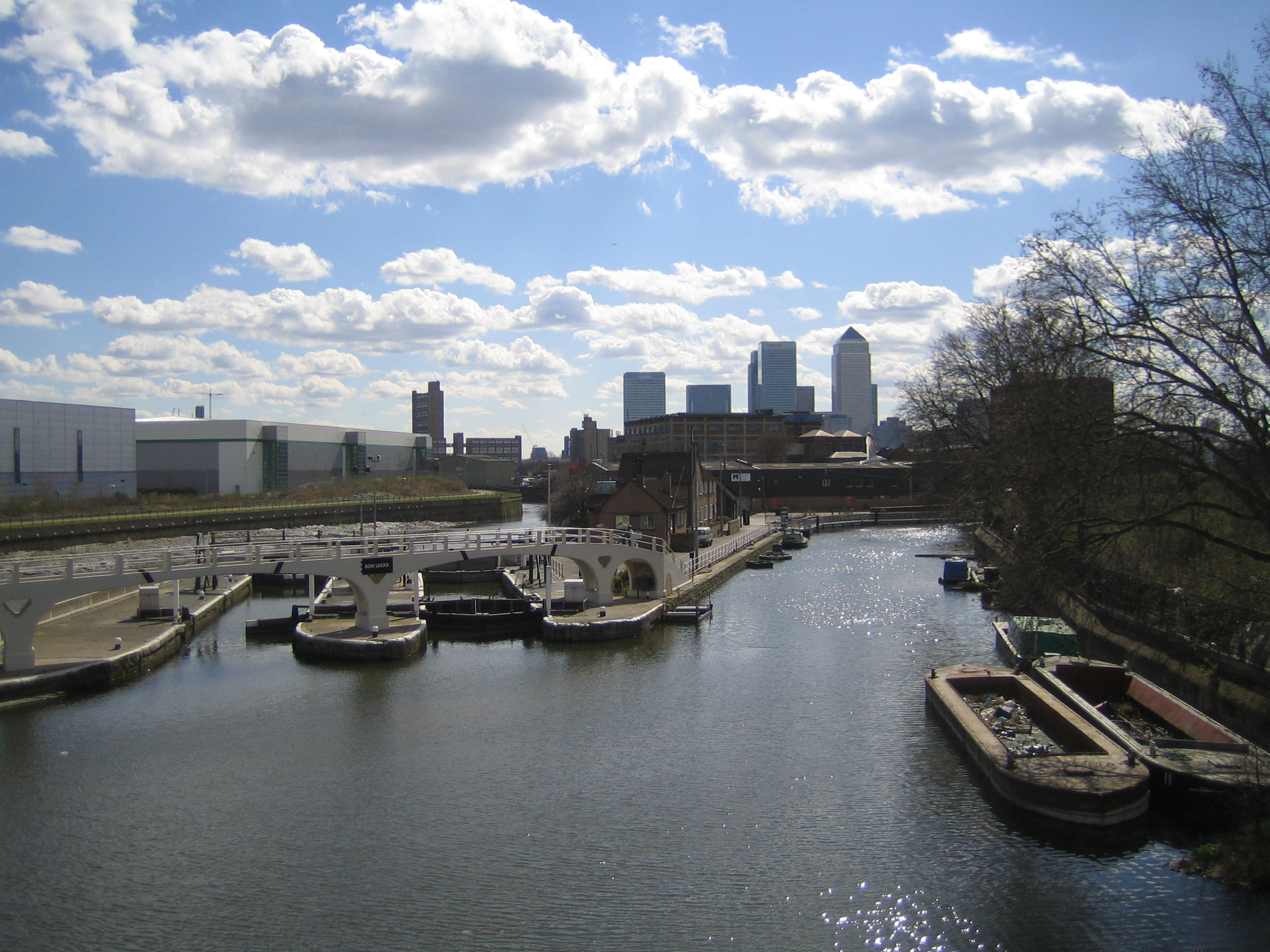
- Bow Locks, with Bow Creek, beyond, at low tide. Limehouse Cut begins to the right of the locks.
- Interactive map of Bow Locks
- 51.523°N 0.0081°W
- Waterway: River Lee Navigation
- County: Tower Hamlets; Greater London
- Maintained by: Canal & River Trust
- Operation: Mechanical
- First built: 1850
- Latest built: 1930
- Length: 95 feet (29.0 m)
- Width: 19 feet 6 inches (5.94 m)
- Fall: tidal
- Distance to Hertford Castle Weir: 28 miles (45.1 km)

Bow Locks No. 20 (grid reference TQ383824) is a set of bi-directional locks in Bromley-by-Bow in the London Borough of Tower Hamlets and Newham. The locks link the tidal Bow Creek to the River Lee Navigation, which is a canalised river. These locks were first built in 1850 and then rebuilt in 1930, at the same time as the Prescott Channel was cut nearby. At high tide, the tide from Bow Creek formerly flowed through Bow Locks, to raise the level of the canals, such as the Limehouse Cut. In 2000, these locks were modified to keep the tide out, to reduce silting in the canal system.

== History ==
Bow Locks has a long history, as the first recorded mention of a water control structure at the site was during the reign of Edward I, when Henry de Bedyk, the prior at Halliwell Priory and owner of the nearby tide mills. He erected a structure some time before 1307. Despite juries ruling in 1345 and 1362 that it should be removed, it remained in place, and its existence was not contested when commissioners were appointed in 1551. A description of its operation in 1416 indicates that it was similar to a flash lock, consisting of a dam with a navigable channel through it. The channel was 18 feet (5.5 m) wide, and could be closed off using flashboards, to maintain water levels above it.

The owners of the mills rebuilt the structure, referred to as a lock, in 1573. In order to ensure that navigation would be maintained on the Lea, the City of London appointed a Dutch surveyor to inspect the plans, and a committee to oversee the work. A report by Lord Burghley in 1588 suggests that the gates opened automatically when the level in Bow Creek exceeded the level above the lock, and were shut once the tide started to fall. This arrangement caused complaints in 1581, when neap tides did not reach a level to cause the gates to open, and the lock keeper would not open them because the water was used by the mills. The use of flashboards was again recorded in the 1660s, but shortly after 1713, the cill of the structure was raised, and a pair of gates were installed. This improved water levels for the millers, but again caused problems for navigation, with bargees complaining that the gates could not be opened at neap tides. In 1721, the cill was lowered by the mill owners, following recommendations by George Succold, and the work was overseen by a surveyor appointed by the City of London.

The conflicting interests of bargees and millers continued. As the river was important for trade, the engineer John Smeaton was asked to recommend improvements in 1765. He produced a report in 1766, in which he suggested a cut from Bow Locks to Limehouse, to provide a better route to the Thames than that through the gates and Bow Creek, and the conversion of flash locks to pound locks. The Limehouse Cut was built, opening in its final form in 1777, but the lock was not altered.

A pound lock was eventually constructed between 1851 and 1852, to accommodate barges up to 108 by 20 feet (32.9 by 6.1 m). Use of the river was toll-free, up to the lock at Old Ford, and the principle was maintained by a clause in the enabling Act of Parliament. However, the trustees imposed a toll for using the lock once it had been built, which was unpopular with the bargees. A compromise was reached, where use of the lock required the payment of a toll, but use of the adjacent flood gates, which could only be used at certain states of the tide, did not. A clause to formalise this arrangement was removed by Parliament from a subsequent Act in 1868, but the practice of free passage through the gates but not the lock continued. The lock was rebuilt in 1900, when its length was reduced to 93.5 feet (28.5 m), and a second lock of the same size was built next to it in 1931. Extreme high tides continued to flow over the top of the lock, inundating the Limehouse Cut until 2000, when a flood wall and a second set of gates were installed, enabling the lock to be used at all states of the tide and preventing overtopping. Funding for the project was provided by the London Waterway Partnership.

In 2004–05, British Waterways refurbished the historic footbridge which crosses the locks. The bridge was originally built as part of the 1930s upgrade to the Bow Back Rivers, and was an early example of the use of reinforced concrete to achieve a slender design. Work included replacing some defective concrete with new, replacement of the handrails, installing a new surface to the walkway, and the application of a protective coating to the structure. The work cost £3.3 million, and required a complex arrangement of scaffolding, to allow boats to continue to use the lock during the bridge's 6-month refurbishment.

== Access and transport ==
There is pedestrian and cycle access via the towpath which also forms part of the Lea Valley Walk.

The nearest London Underground stations are Bromley-by-Bow and West Ham.

== Gallery ==
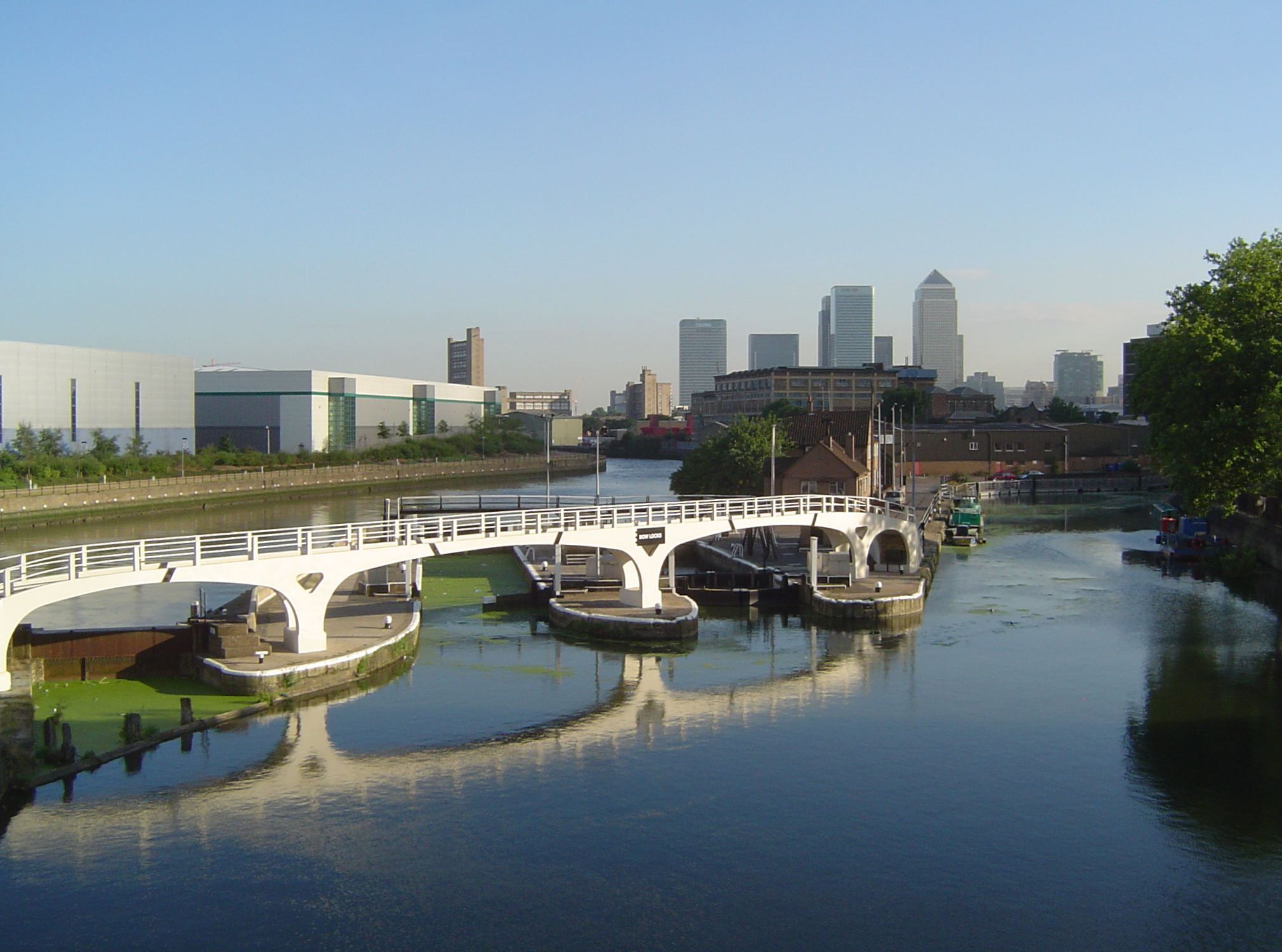
2005

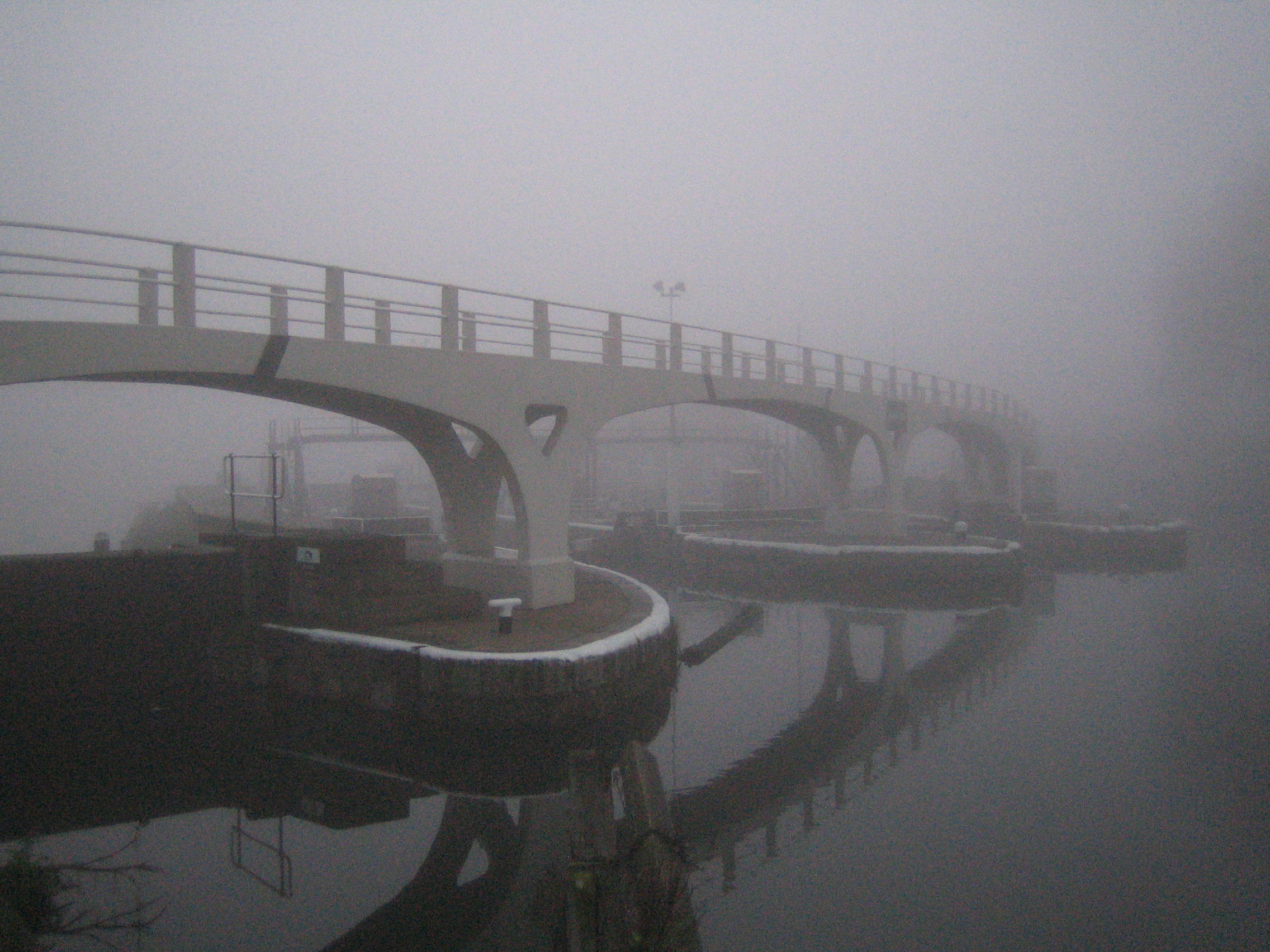
In fog, 2007

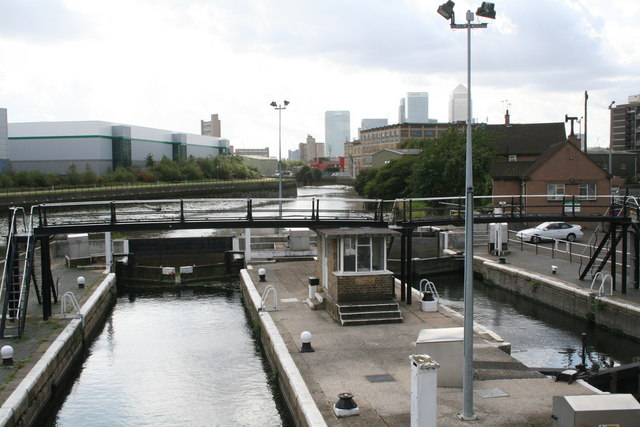
September 2008

== See also ==
- Canals of the United Kingdom
- History of the British canal system

== Bibliography ==
- Boyes, John; Russell, Ronald (1977). The Canals of Eastern England. David and Charles. ISBN 978-0-7153-7415-3.
- Thomas, Richard (2010). Bow Locks. History of the Lee and Stort Navigation. Richard Thomas.

=== References ===
Next lock upstream	River Lee Navigation	Next lock downstream
Old Ford Lock; 1.25 miles	Bow Locks; Grid reference: TQ383824	none
