= Eliot Warburton =

Irish traveller and novelist

- Born: Eliot Bartholomew-George Warburton; 1810; Tullamore, County Offaly, Ireland, UK
- Died: 4 January 1852 (aged 41–42) at sea, RMS Amazon in the Bay of Biscay
- Spouse: Matilda Jane Grove
- Children: George Hartopp Eliot and Piers Eliot
- Relatives: George Drought Warburton (brother)
- Writing career
- Subjects: Travel writing, historical fiction
- Notable works: The Crescent and the Cross

Bartholomew Eliot George Warburton (1810–1852), usually known as Eliot Warburton, was an Irish traveller and novelist, born near Tullamore, Ireland.

== Biography ==
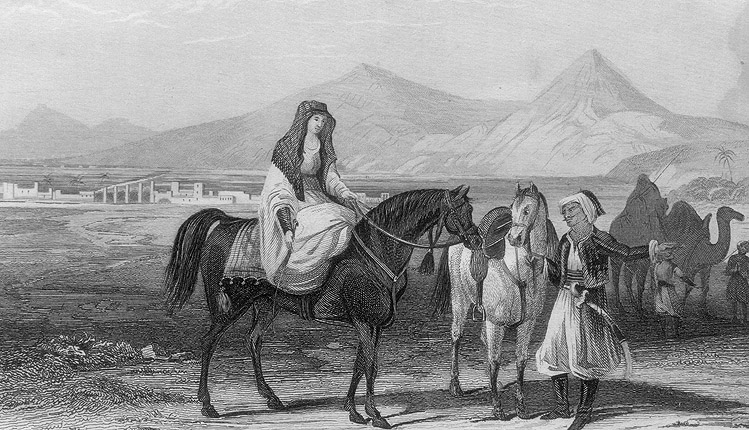
Plate from The Crescent and the Cross entitled "Encampment at Baalbec, lady and dragoman in foreground."

His father was Major George Warburton, Inspector General of the Royal Irish Constabulary for Aughrim, County Galway. His mother was Anne Maria Acton of Kilmacurragh, County Wicklow. He was educated at Trinity College, Cambridge, and was called to the Irish Bar in 1837. He contracted lasting friendships with Monckton Milnes (Lord Houghton) and AW Kinglake, author of Eothen, which he admired. He decided to give up his practice as a barrister for travel and literature.

His first travel articles were published in the Dublin University Magazine, where the editor, Charles Lever persuaded him to make them into a book. This became his first book, The Crescent and the Cross, an account of his travels in 1843 in Greece, Turkey, Syria, Palestine and Egypt, and which fairly divided public attention with Kinglake's Eothen, which appeared in the same year, 1844. Interest in England was centred in the East at the time, and Warburton had popular sympathy with Kinglake in his advocacy of the annexation of Egypt. But, apart from this consideration, the spirited narrative of Warburton's adventures and the picturesque sketches of Eastern life and character were more than sufficient to justify the success of the book. It was a huge success and went into 18 editions.

In 1847 Warburton wrote Zoë: an episode of the Greek War, derived from a story he had heard while visiting the Greek islands. He donated the proceeds of the book to Irish famine relief. His most substantial work was a Memoir of Prince Rupert and the Cavaliers (1849), enriched with original documents, and written with eloquent partiality for the subject. This was followed in 1850 by Reginald Hastings, a novel, the scenes of which were laid in the same period of civil war, and, in 1851, by another historical novel, Darien, or The Merchant Prince. He was also for a time the editor of The Gentleman's Magazine.

He was planning to write a history of the poor, and on his last visit to Dublin visited slums and poor areas of the city. However, in 1852 he was sent by the Atlantic and Pacific Junction Company to explore the isthmus of Darién and to negotiate friendly relations between the company and the local Indian tribes. He sailed on this mission aboard the steamship RMS Amazon, and died along with about 110 other passengers and crew when the Amazon caught fire and sank on 4 January 1852 in the Bay of Biscay.

== Family ==
On 11 January 1848, he married Matilda Jane, second daughter of Edward Grove, of Shenstone Park, Staffordshire. They had two sons, George and Piers.

His brother, Major George Drought Warburton (1816–1857, named after his uncle George Drought of Glencarrig, County Wicklow), collaborated with him on Hochelaga, or England in the New World (1847), and The Conquest of Canada (1849). Another brother, Thomas, studied law at Trinity College, Dublin, while a sister, Sidney, was also a writer.

== Bibliography ==
=== Fiction ===
- Zoë: an episode of the Greek War. 1847.
- Reginald Hastings. London: Henry Colburn. 1850.
- Darien: Or, The Merchant Prince. London: Henry Colburn. 1852.

=== Nonfiction ===
- The Crescent and the Cross. London: Henry Colburn. 1844.
- Hochelaga, or, England in the New World. London: Henry Colburn. 1847. (with George Warburton)
- Memoirs of Prince Rupert, and the Cavaliers. London: Richard Bentley. 1849.
- Memoirs of Horace Walpole and His Contemporaries. London: Colburn & Co. 1852.
- A Memoir of Charles Mordaunt, Earl of Peterborough and Monmouth. London: Longman, Brown, Green, and Longmans. 1853. (posthumous; with George Warburton)
