= RMS Atrato (1853) =

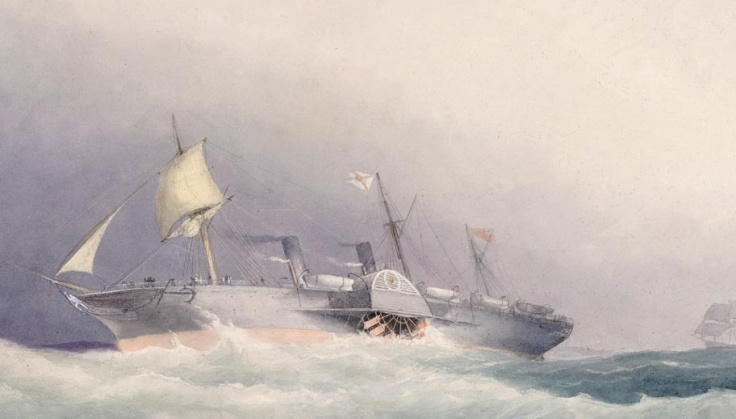
- "SS Atrato of the Royal Mail Steam Packet Company", painted by William Frederick Mitchell

History

United Kingdom
- Name: Atrato (1853–80); Rochester (1880–84)
- Namesake: Atrato River in Colombia (1853–80); Rochester, Kent (1880–84)
- Owner: RMSP Co (1853–70); John Morrison & Co (1872–79); Henry T Horn (1879–80); Adamson & Ronaldson (1880–84)
- Operator: Aberdeen Line (1872–)
- Route: Southampton – Caribbean (1853–70)
- Builder: Caird & Company, Greenock
- Yard number: 26
- Launched: 26 April 1853
- Identification: UK official number 13926
- Fate: Sank 25 June 1884

General characteristics
- Type: Iron-hulled steamship
- Tonnage: 1853: 3,466 GRT, 2,260 NRT; 1872: 3,184 GRT 2,051 NRT
- Length: 1853: 350 feet (110 m); 1872: 335.9 feet (102.4 m)
- Beam: 1853: 42 feet (13 m), 72 feet (22 m) over paddles; 1872: 42.4 feet (12.9 m)
- Installed power: 1853: 800 ihp; 1872: 350 horsepower
- Propulsion: 1853–70: 2-cylinder side-lever steam engine, side paddles; 1870–84: 2-cylinder compound steam engine, single screw
- Sail plan: 3-masted barquentine
- Speed: 10 knots (19 km/h)

RMS Atrato was a UK iron-hulled steamship. She was built in 1853 for the Royal Mail Steam Packet Company as a side-wheel paddle steamer, and at the time of her launch was the world's largest passenger ship. In 1870 RMSP traded Atrato in, causing her to lose the status of "Royal Mail Ship". She was converted to a single screw ship with a compound steam engine in 1872, and placed on the Aberdeen Line that chartered her to run to Victoria and New Zealand. In 1880 she was renamed Rochester before sinking four years later in 1884 by running aground.

== Demerara and Amazon ==
Until 1850 RMSP secured its first contract to carry mail between the UK, Brazil and the River Plate. It ordered five large new wooden-hulled sister ships to take over scheduled services on its premier route between Southampton and the Caribbean, thus releasing older RMSP ships to start its new service to Rio de Janeiro, Montevideo and Buenos Aires.

One of the new ships, the 2,318 NRT Demerara, was built in Bristol by William Patterson Shipbuilders, but her engines were built by Caird & Company of Greenock. After her launch in November 1851 a steam tug started to tow from Bristol to Greenock for her engines to be installed. But the tug master lacked experience of the winding Avon and lost control of Demerara, which became wedged against both banks. When the tide went out the ship was left bridging the river, and suffered structural distortion from the 1,200 tons of ballast in her engine room.

RMSP rejected the damaged ship, which was effectively a "constructive total loss" – a concept then unknown in marine insurance. RMSP was then left with one ship missing from the quintet it needed for its new service, and an engine in Greenock with no ship into which to put it.

Until 1851 the Admiralty had insisted that ships for mail contracts had to have a wooden hull. However, two months after Demerara's accident RMS Amazon, another member of the new quintet, caught fire and sank in the Bay of Biscay on her maiden voyage. More than 100 passengers and crew were killed and the Admiralty agreed to allow iron-hulled ships to be used for mail services.

== Atrato with RMSP ==
RMSP duly ordered an iron-hulled ship from Caird & Company to use Demerara's engines and fill one of the gaps in the new fleet. In design she was an improved, enlarged, iron-hulled version of Demerara. The engine was a two-cylinder side-lever steam engine that developed 800 ihp and drove a pair of side paddles, giving her a speed of 10 knots (19 km/h). For some reason Caird did not use Demerara's boilers for Atrato but supplied new ones.

Atrato was completed in 1853 and entered service between Southampton and the Caribbean. In April 1856 she and two other RMSP ships, La Plata and Tay, attended the Spithead Review to celebrate the end of the Crimean War.

By 1869 Atrato was outdated for RMSP's use. John Elder and Company of Govan built a new ship, Elbe for the company and in 1870 accepted Atrato in part-payment.

== After RMSP ==
Later in 1870 John Morrison and Company of London bought Atrato. In 1872 Aberdeen Line chartered her to run between Britain and Port Phillip, Victoria via Cape Town. James Watt and Company of London re-engined her as a single-screw vessel with a two-cylinder compound engine fed by three double-ended boilers. Her first such voyage to Port Phillip was in September 1872. In 1874 she sailed to New Zealand, leaving London on 5 April, calling at Port Chalmers on 8 June and reaching Lyttelton Harbour on 20 June.

In 1879 Henry T Horn of Sidcup, Kent bought Atrato. In 1880 Adamson and Ronaldson of Rochester, Kent bought her and renamed her Rochester. On 25 June 1884 she was lost by stranding on Stag Rock, Spring Bay, Patagonia. Her crew survived.

== Sources ==
- Nicol, Stuart (2001). MacQueen's Legacy; Ships of the Royal Mail Line. Vol. Two. Brimscombe Port and Charleston, SC: Tempus Publishing. ISBN 0-7524-2119-0.
