= HMS Recruit (1846) =

Brig of the Royal Navy

History

United Kingdom
- Name: HMS Recruit
- Ordered: 6 May 1844
- Builder: Thames Ironworks and Shipbuilding Company
- Launched: 10 June 1846
- Fate: Sold 28 August 1849

General characteristics
- Class & type: Brig
- Tons burthen: 462 bm
- Length: 114 ft 5 in (34.87 m) (gundeck); 92 ft 5 in (28.17 m) (keel)
- Beam: 30 ft 8.5 in (9.360 m)
- Propulsion: Sail
- Armament: 12 guns, comprising 2 × 18-pounder guns and 10 × 32-pounder guns.

HMS Recruit was a 12-gun iron-hulled sailing brig of the Royal Navy, constructed by the Thames Ironworks and Shipbuilding Company and launched in 1846.

Recruit was the first iron-hulled vessel to be built for the Admiralty, and the Royal Navy's only iron-hulled sailing ship. She was sold back to her builders, Ditchburn and Mare on 28 August 1849, and was resold in 1852 to the General Screw Steam Shipping Company and converted into a screw steamer for the East Indian and Cape mail service, and renamed SS Harbinger.

== Sources ==
- Colledge, J. J.; Warlow, Ben (2006) [1969]. Ships of the Royal Navy: The Complete Record of All Fighting Ships of the Royal Navy from the 15th Century to the Present (3rd Rev ed.). London: Chatham Publishing. ISBN 978-1-86176-281-8. OCLC 67375475.
- Lyon, David & Winfield, Rif (2004), The Sail and Steam Navy List: All the Ships of the Royal Navy 1815-1889. ISBN 1-86176-032-9.
- "General Screw Steam Shipping Company 1848-1857". The Ships List. Archived from the original on 2 January 2008.
