= Bow Creek (London) =

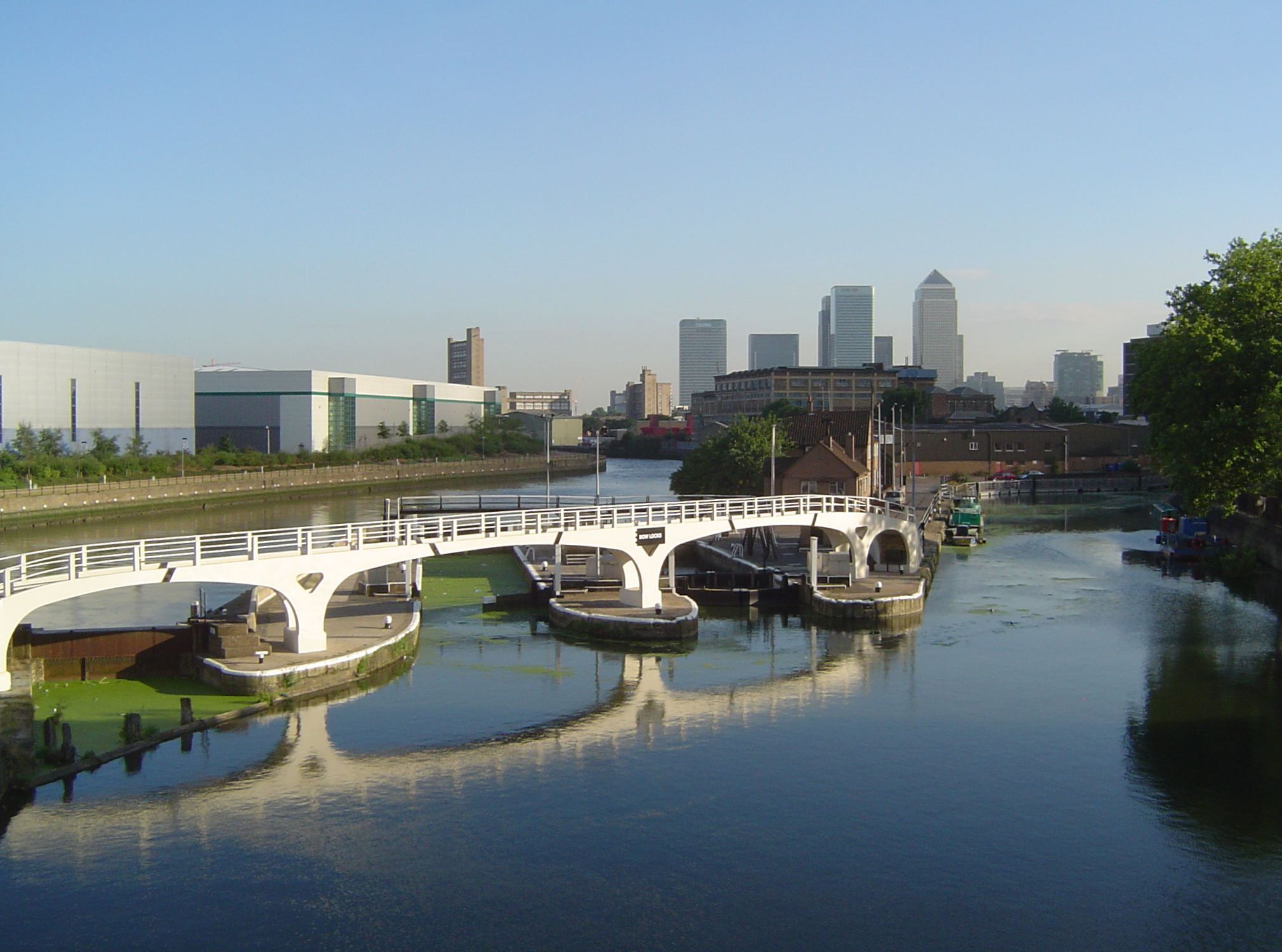
- Bow Creek (tidal) (far left) meets the Limehouse Cut (canal, right), at Bow Locks on the Lee Navigation (centre); with a view of Canary Wharf

Location
- Country: England

Physical characteristics
- Source
  - location: Confluence of Prescott Channel and Channelsea River at Bow Locks
- Mouth
  - location: River Thames, Leamouth
- Length: 2.25 mi (3.62 km)

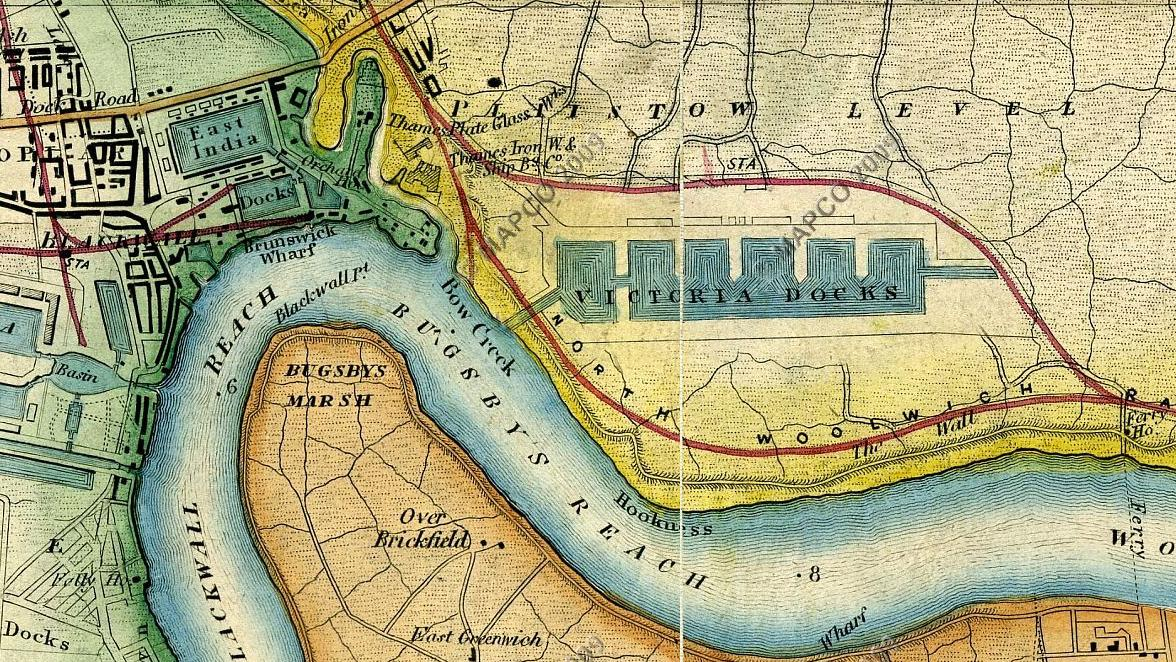
Map c1872, showing Victoria Docks, now Royal Victoria Dock, Bow Creek and the Thames Ironworks and Shipbuilding Company

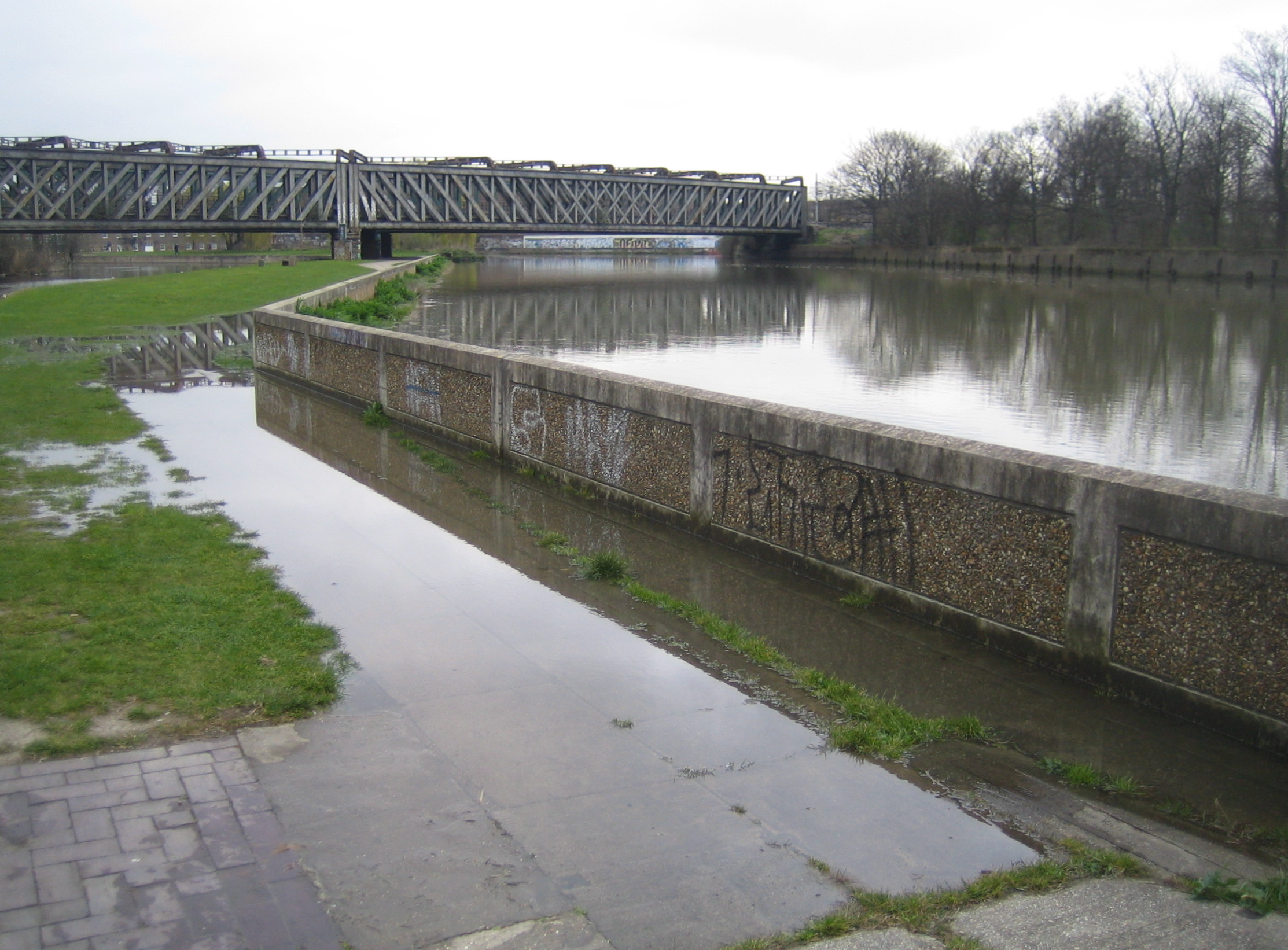
Bow Creek flooding at high tide

Bow Creek is a 2.25-mile (3.6 km) long tidal estuary of the English River Lea and is part of the Bow Back Rivers. Below Bow Locks the creek forms the boundary between the London Boroughs of Newham and Tower Hamlets, in East London.

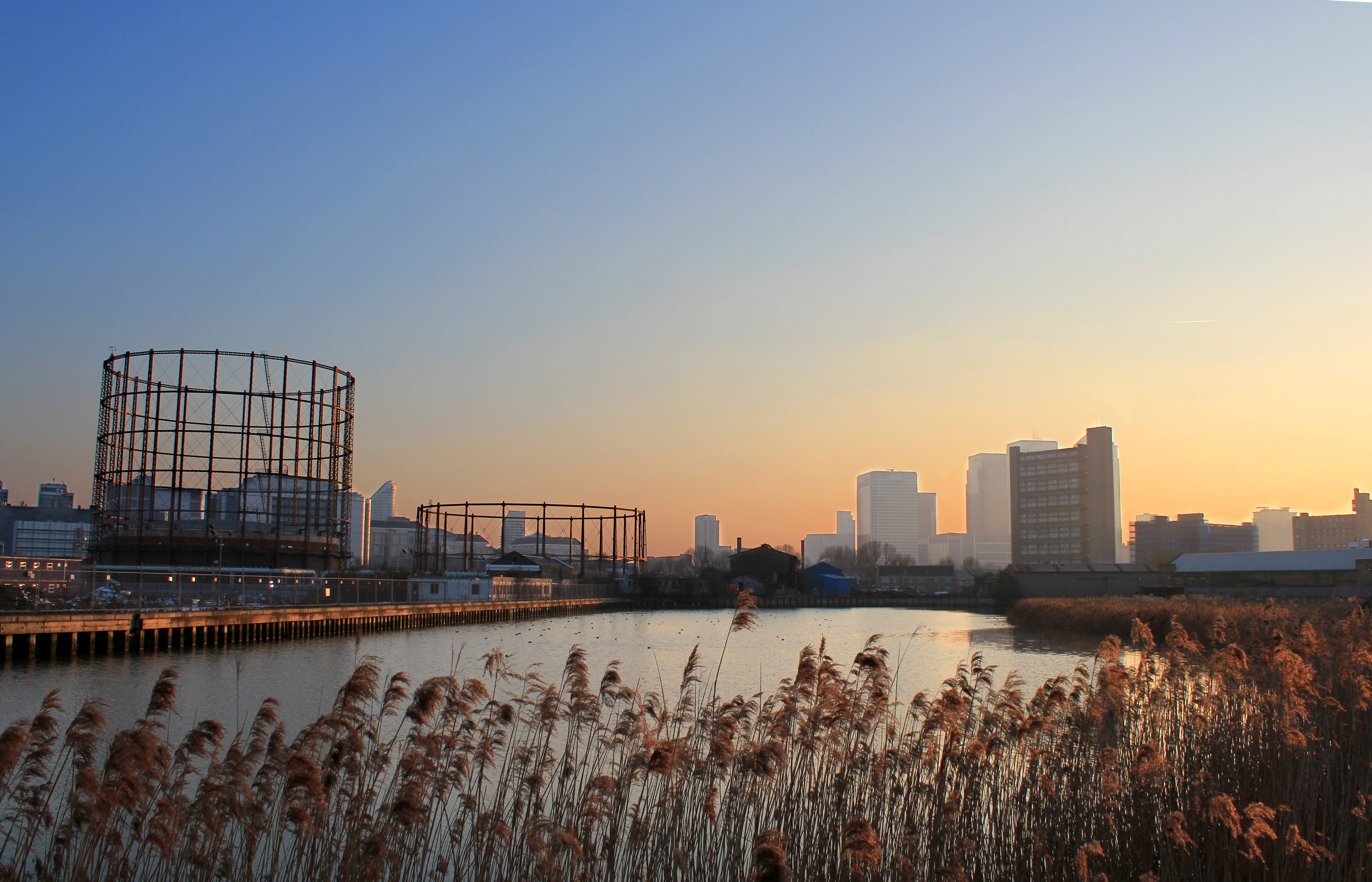
Bow Creek at high tide with a view towards Balfron Tower and Canary Wharf

== History ==
The River Lea rises in the town of Luton in Bedfordshire, and flows to the east and then the south to reach the River Thames at Leamouth in Poplar. The final 2.25 miles (3.62 km) are known as Bow Creek, and follow a meandering route across a low-lying area formerly called Bromley Marsh, but now occupied by gas works and trading estates. The river is one of the oldest navigations in the country, but the creek is tidal, providing insufficient depth for navigation at low tide.

Use of the river for navigation is recorded in documents dating from 1190 and it became the first river in Britain where improvements were authorised by an act of Parliament, the River Lee Navigation Act 1425 (3 Hen. 6. c. 5). The River Lee Navigation Act 1571 (13 Eliz. 1. c. 18) allowed the Lord Mayor to make cuts and improvements to the river and to construct towing paths on both sides of it. This work is thought to have included a new cut between Old Ford and Bow Locks, which is known as Bow River and, like Bow Creek, is not subject to tolls for those using it. During the great plague of 1665, bargemen on the river continued to supply food to the population of London and were granted permission to navigate the Thames without having to ask a Thames Lighterman for assistance, in recognition of the risks they had taken.

Because of the importance of the river for navigation, the engineer John Smeaton was asked to survey it and to suggest how it could be improved in 1765. He produced a report in 1766, which recommended replacing the flash locks with more modern pound locks, and more significantly for Bow Creek, making a new cut from Bow tidal gates to the Thames at Limehouse. Although only a little further to the west, access at Limehouse avoided the long loop around the Isle of Dogs for traffic heading towards London. The cut was to be opened on 2 July 1770, but failure of a side wall delayed the event until September and a bridge collapsed into it in December. Traffic began to switch to the new cut, which was too narrow to allow barges to pass one another, and so a programme of widening it, which was completed in September 1777, was carried out. The channel now ends in Limehouse Basin.

Access to the new navigation, now known as the Lee Navigation, was still by tidal gates at Bow. There had been gates at the site since at least 1307, as a structure was erected by Henry de Bedyk during the reign of Edward I of England. The gates were rebuilt in 1573 by the owners of the tide mill, but the City of London appointed a surveyor to inspect the plans and a committee to oversee the work. Documents from 1588 suggest that the gates opened automatically when the incoming tide reached a level with the river above them. Another rebuilding took place in 1721, again by the tide mill owners, and with the City of London appointing a surveyor to oversee the work. Smeaton, in 1766, suggested that the gates should be replaced by a conventional pound lock, but this was not carried out. However, in 1852 a lock was constructed, although the gates also remained in place. The lock was rebuilt and shortened in 1900, and a second lock constructed beside it in 1931. Higher floodgates and walls were added in 2000 to prevent the inundation of the Lee Navigation when the level of the tide in the creek exceeded the level in the navigation.

Access from the creek to Bow Back Rivers was altered in the 1930s as part of an upgrade carried out to improve the waterways and to provide employment. The Prescott Channel was constructed to bypass the tide mills, and gave access from the creek to the Three Mills Wall River and the Waterworks River. The lock and sluice structure at the mouth of the new channel became disused in the 1960s and was subsequently removed, but a new structure capable of handling 350-tonne barges has been built as part of the upgrade to the waterways for the 2012 Summer Olympics, recreating a navigable connection between the creek and the Bow Back Rivers. The creek gave access to Abbey Creek and the Channelsea River, which connected to the old course of the River Lea near Hackney Marshes. Most of this waterway has since been culverted. Water also entered the creek through the sluices of the tide mills at Three Mills.

Ships were built at the Orchard House Yard, in the southern reaches at Leamouth, and launched in the creek where they could travel north along the River Lee Navigation or south to the River Thames. In 1810, an iron bridge was built spanning the creek – just south of the modern A13 bridge. The abutments have been reused for the pedestrian Jubilee Bridge.

== River Crossings ==
The crossings below are the current river crossings, from the mouth of Bow Creek on the Thames upstream to House Mill.

Crossing	Type	Coordinates	Opened	Notes	Photo
Lower Lea Crossing A1020	Fixed vehicle bridge	51.5101°N 0.0062°E			
Crossrail	Railway tunnel	51.5105°N 0.0061°E			
Leamouth Lifting Footbridge	Pedestrian lift bridge, arch bridge	51.5142°N 0.0068°E			
Docklands Light Railway, Beckton/Woolwich Arsenal Branch	Fixed Light rail bridge	51.5107°N 0.0025°E			
Canning Town Old Railway Bridge	Iron truss railway bridge, abandoned	51.5136°N 0.0035°E			
Dock Road Foot bridge, also called Jubilee Bridge or the Blue Bridge	Steel truss bridge, pedestrian and pipelines	51.5139°N 0.0037°E			
Barking Road Bridge, A13, set of 3 bridges	Steel girder bridge	51.5146°N 0.0039°E			
Mayer Parry Bridge	proposed cycle bridge	51.5165°N 0.0008°E			
	Pipeline bridge	51.5179°N 0.0021°W			
Poplar Reach Bridge	proposed cycle bridge	51.5179°N 0.0031°W			
Lochnagar Bridge	proposed cycle bridge	51.5180°N 0.0060°W			
	Pipeline bridge	51.5187°N 0.0068°W			
Bow Locks	Private footbridges over lock, public pedestrian and cycle bridge	51.5231°N 0.0081°W			
Twelvetreees Crescent Bridge	Road bridge and two gas pipelines	51.5239°N 0.0074°W			
	Concrete bridge, former footbridge, now carrying electric cables from National Grid	51.5242°N 0.0074°W			
Thames Tideway Tunnel	Wastewater tunnel	51.5242°N 0.0074°W			
Bow Locks Railway Bridge, set of 2 bridges	Steel railway truss bridges, carrying London, Tilbury & Southend Railway (southern bridge), District and Hammersmith & City lines (northern bridge)	51.5256°N 0.0069°W			
Tree Mills	former watermill complex, Three Mill Lane	51.5274°N 0.0078°W			

== See also ==
- Bow Creek Ecology Park
- Samuda Brothers
- Thames Ironworks and Shipbuilding Company

== Bibliography ==
- Boyes, John; Russell, Ronald (1977). The Canals of Eastern England. David and Charles. ISBN 978-0-7153-7415-3.
- Thomas, Richard (2010). Bow Locks. History of the Lee and Stort Navigation. Richard Thomas.
