= Tottenham Marshes =

Boggy Lane

Coordinates: 51.595931°N 0.053832°W

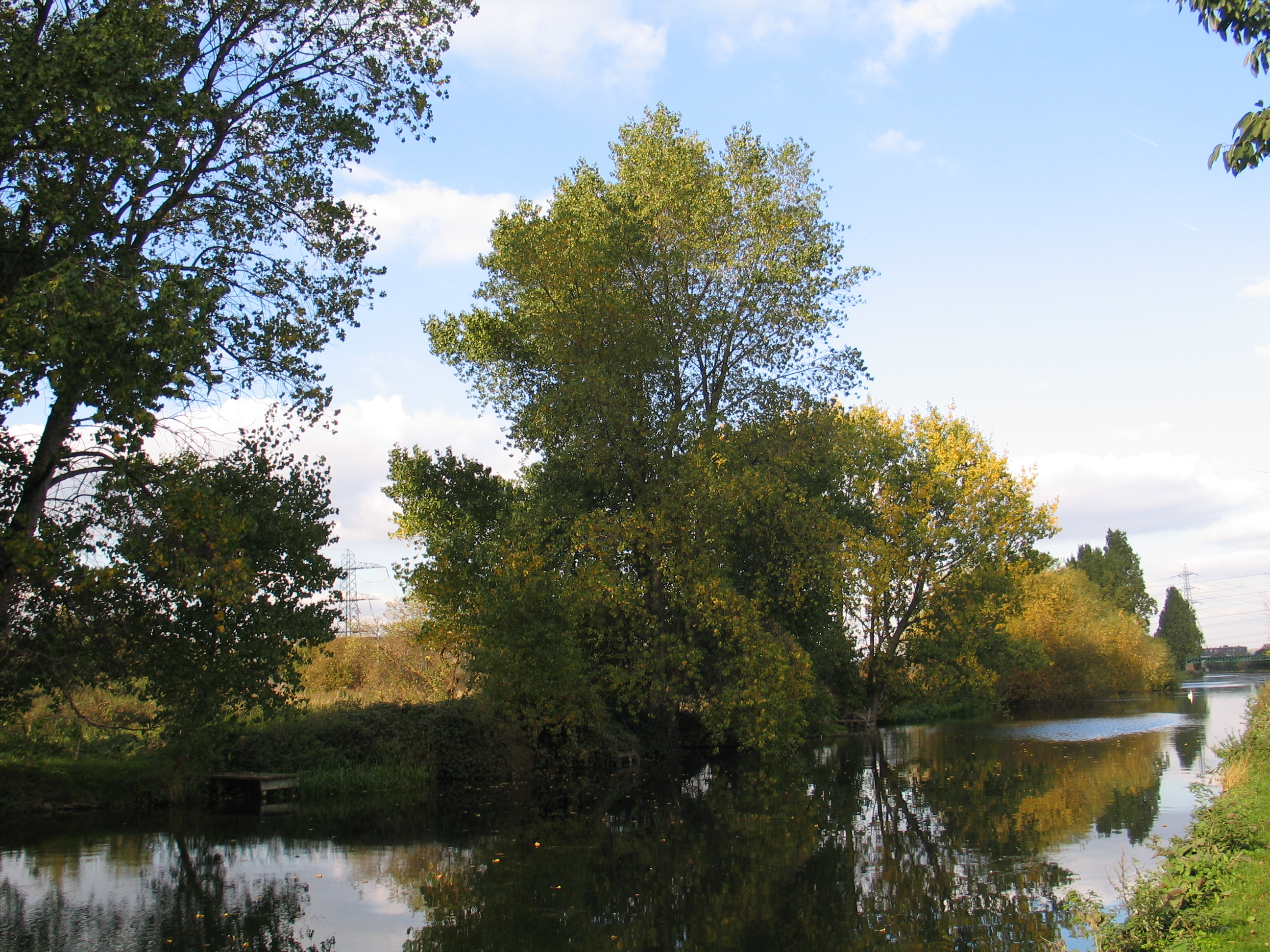
Wild Marsh West seen across the River Lea

The Tottenham Marshes are located at Tottenham in the London Borough of Haringey. The marshes cover over 100 acres (0.40 km^{2}) and became part of the Lee Valley Park in 1972. The marsh is made up of three main areas: Clendish Marsh, Wild Marsh West and Wild Marsh East. The latter two are separated by the River Lea.

== Description ==
The marshes are one of the last remaining examples of semi-natural wetland in Greater London. They contain a variety of plant communities typical of a former flood plain location, such as a range of neutral grassland types, sedge marsh, reed swamp, sallow scrub and areas of tall herb vegetation. Associated with this diversity of habitat are several species of plant and insect which are rarely seen in London.

== History ==
The 100 acres (0.40 km^{2}) of marshes were originally a flood plain of the River Lea. But significant changes have been made over the years. Between the 1860s and 1930 a range of facilities including tennis courts and swimming were available but after World War II between 1946 and 1960 the area was used for gravel extraction and landfill. In the late 19th century the Wild Marsh East was bisected when the River Lea was diverted to accommodate the construction of some of the Lee Valley Reservoir Chain. The marsh was the first home ground of Tottenham Hotspur Football Club in 1882. The Lee Valley Regional Park Authority (LVRPA), created by an Act of Parliament in 1965, bought Tottenham Marshes in 1972.

== Ecology ==
Plants

Many species of plants can be found on the marsh including:

- Wall bedstraw (Galium parisiense)
- Yellow vetchling (Lathyrus aphaca)
- Bee orchid (Ophrys apifera)
- Babington's poppy (Papaver dubilum)
- Wurzell's wormwood (Artemisia vulgaris × verlotiorum)

Butterflies

- Brown argus (Aricia agestis)

Birds

- Skylark (Alauda arvensis)
- Short-eared owl (Asio flammeus)
