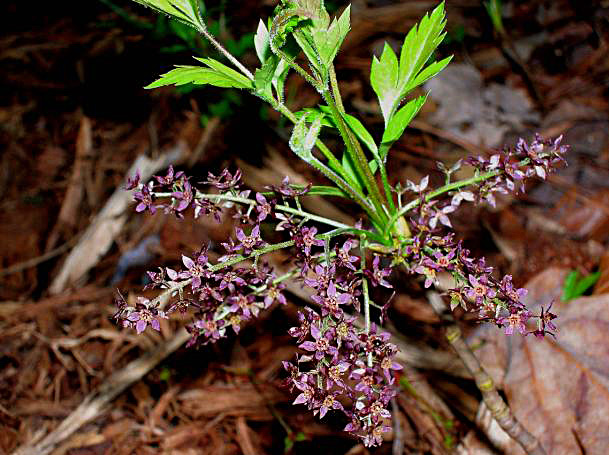
- Yellowroot flowers in spring

Conservation status
- Secure (NatureServe)

Scientific classification
- Kingdom: Plantae
- Clade: Tracheophytes
- Clade: Angiosperms
- Clade: Eudicots
- Order: Ranunculales
- Family: Ranunculaceae
- Subfamily: Coptidoideae
- Genus: Xanthorhiza; Marshall
- Species: X. simplicissima

Binomial name
- Xanthorhiza simplicissima Marshall

Synonyms
- Xanthorhiza apiifolia L'Hér.

= Xanthorhiza =

Yellowroot

Genus of flowering plants

Xanthorhiza simplicissima (yellowroot) is the only member of the genus Xanthorhiza, and one of very few genera in the family Ranunculaceae with a woody stem (the other notable example being Clematis). It is native to the eastern United States from Maine south to northern Florida and west to Ohio and eastern Texas. It contains the alkaloid berberine, which has a number of traditional and contemporary uses for dyeing and medicine.

The genus name as well as the common name refer to the plant's yellow roots (xantho- meaning "yellow" and rhiza meaning "root"), which was used to produce a yellow dye by Native Americans. The specific epithet refers to the simple (not branched) stems.

== Description ==
In the wild, it grows on the edges of streams in sandy soil under a canopy of dappled sunlight. In cultivation, it is often provided with more sunlight so that the fall colors are more vivid. It is a subshrub, reaching 20–70 centimetres (8–28 in) (rarely 90 centimetres (35 in)) in height, with stems up to 6 millimetres (0.24 in) diameter. The leaves are spirally arranged, 10–18 centimetres (4–7 in) long, each divided into 5 toothed leaflets, and flowers emerge only from the upper portion of the unbranched stem. The flowers are produced in broad panicles 6–20 centimetres (2–8 in) long, each flower small, star-shaped, reddish brown to purple brown, with five petals.

Yellowroot propagates asexually by sending out many underground runners, and it reproduces sexually with seeds.

Yellowroot is considered an endangered species in Florida.

== Cultivation ==
Yellowroot is comparatively rare in British gardens, although E.H. Wilson and E.A. Bowles are among distinguished plantsmen to have championed its merits. It was grown by Bowles in his garden at Myddelton House, near Enfield, Middlesex, and gardens that currently cultivate it include the Savill Garden at Windsor, Berkshire and the Westonbirt Arboretum near Tetbury, Gloucestershire. Wilson, who regarded yellowroot as one of the best plants for hardy deciduous ground cover, also described (in 1923) its use in the Arnold Arboretum at Harvard University in Massachusetts. It is hardy in USDA winter zones 3 to 9.

== Traditional use ==
Native American cultures used the root tea for stomach ulcers, colds, jaundice, sore mouth or throat and as an astringent. A folk remedy used in the South for diabetes and hypertension. This species contains berberine, which is an anti-inflammatory, astringent, hemostatic, antimicrobial, anticonvulsant and immunostimulant. Berberine also stimulates secretion of bile and bilirubin and may be useful in correcting high tyramine levels in patients with liver cirrhosis.

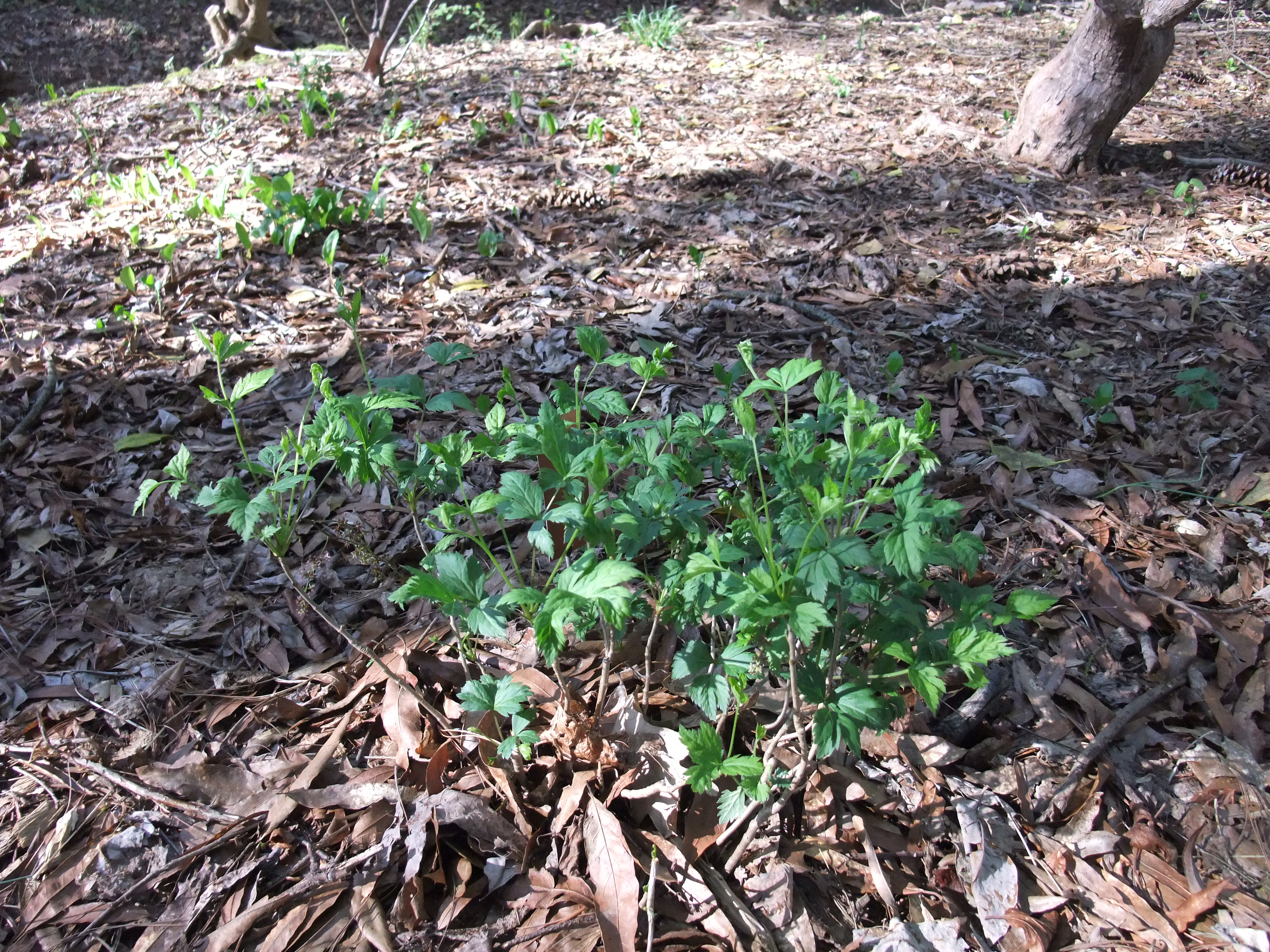

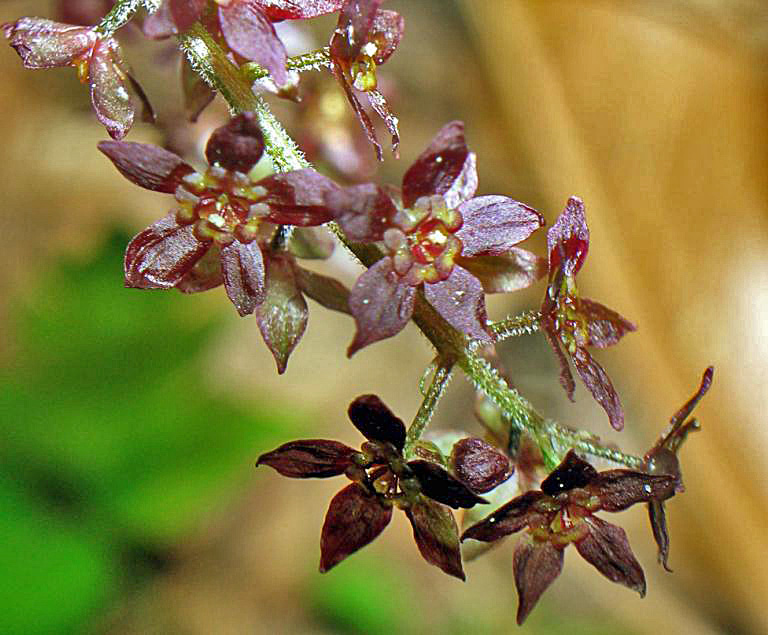
Yellowroot flowers
