= Lee Valley Park =

Linear park along the Lee Valley, England

Coordinates: 51°41′50″N 0°00′58″W

Lee Valley Regional Park
- Length: 26 mi (42 km)
- Location: South eastern England
- Trailheads: East India Docks, Greater London; Ware, Hertfordshire
- Use: Walking, Cycling, Sport, Angling, Birdwatching, Boating, Camping, Horse riding, Ice skating, Golf

Lee Valley Regional Park is a 10,000-acre (40 km^{2}) 26 miles (42 km) long linear park, much of it green spaces, running through the northeast of Greater London, Essex and Hertfordshire. The park follows the course of the River Lea (Lee) along the Lea Valley from Ware in Hertfordshire through Essex and the north east of Greater London, through the Queen Elizabeth Olympic Park to East India Docks Basin on the River Thames. The park is managed by Lee Valley Regional Park Authority and is made up of a diverse mix of countryside areas, urban green spaces, heritage sites, country parks, nature reserves and lakes and riverside trails, as well as leading sports centres covering an area of over 10,000 acres (40 km^{2}). It is crossed by a number of roads and railways.

== Geography ==
The park extends from the River Thames to Ware, Hertfordshire, through areas such as Stratford, Clapton, Tottenham, Enfield, Walthamstow, Waltham Abbey, Cheshunt, Broxbourne and Hoddesdon in an area generally known as the Lea Valley. Greater London's largest park, Lee Valley Park is more than four times the size of Richmond Park, extending beyond Greater London's borders into the neighbouring counties of Hertfordshire and Essex.

Notable parts of the park include: Myddelton House Gardens, Temple Mills, Hackney Marshes, Walthamstow Marshes, Tottenham Marshes, River Lee Country Park, Bow Creek Ecology Park and Lee Valley Reservoir Chain.

There are major reservoirs and water courses (rivers and canals) within Lee Valley Park, both to carry the river flow, and provide navigable waterways and flood relief channels.

=== Olympic Park ===
From London's Olympic bid success in summer 2005 until summer 2012, much of the southern half of the Lee Valley Park was developed to form the Olympic Park for the 2012 Summer Olympics and 2012 Summer Paralympics. Lee Valley Park was extended through the Olympic Park down to the River Thames, adding a further 2 miles (3 km) of open space.

Lee Valley Regional Park Authority owns 35% of the Olympic Park. It funds, manages and owns three venues following the London 2012 Games – Lee Valley White Water Centre in Hertfordshire, Lee Valley VeloPark and the Eton Manor hockey and tennis centres located at the northernmost end of the Queen Elizabeth Olympic Park. The park is working with a range of partners including the Olympic Delivery Authority, London Development Agency and the London Thames Gateway Development Corporation to deliver a major linear park at the heart of a new urban district in the Lower Lea Valley. These venues will join the existing centres the Regional Park currently owns including Lee Valley Athletics Centre, Lee Valley Riding Centre and Lee Valley Ice Centre.

== Governance ==
The park is governed by the Lee Valley Regional Park Authority.

== Transport ==
London Buses route 215 serves the regional park at the entrance to Lee Valley Campsite in Sewardstone.

== See also ==
- Lea Valley Walk

== Gallery ==
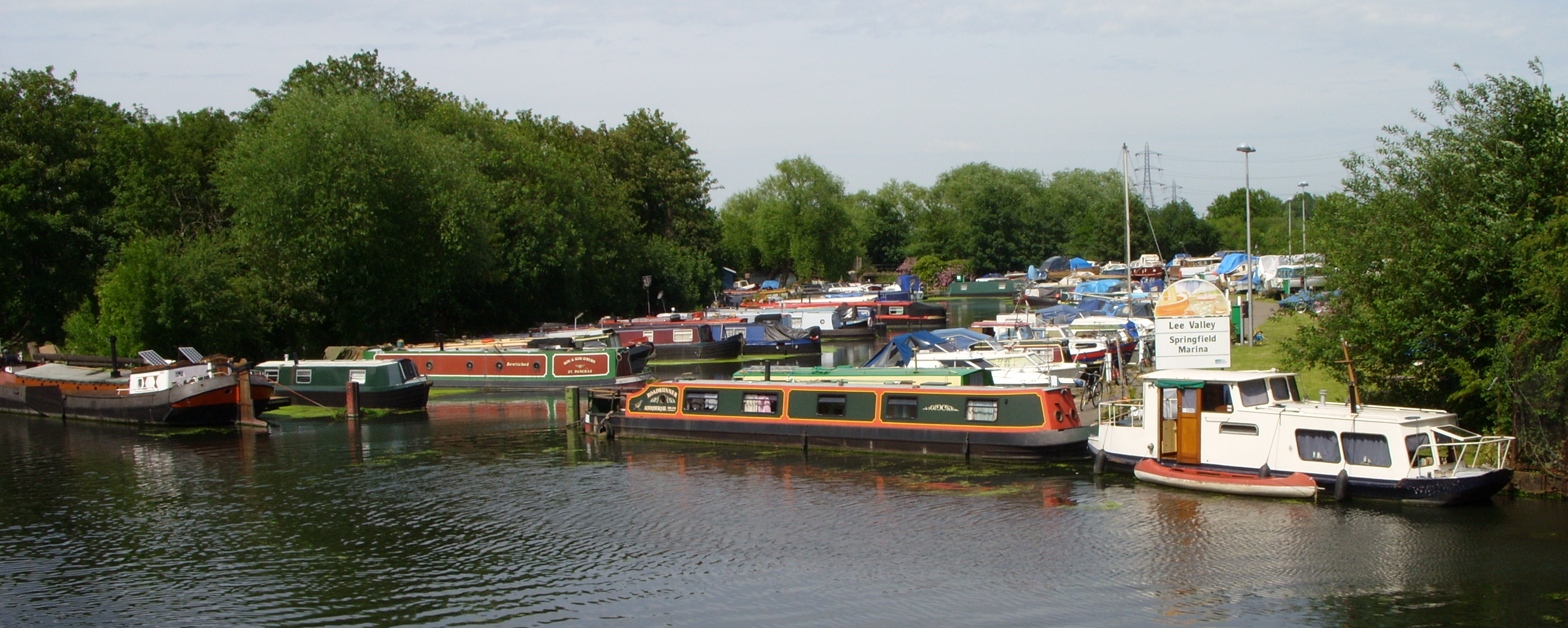
Springfield Marina near the southern end of the park

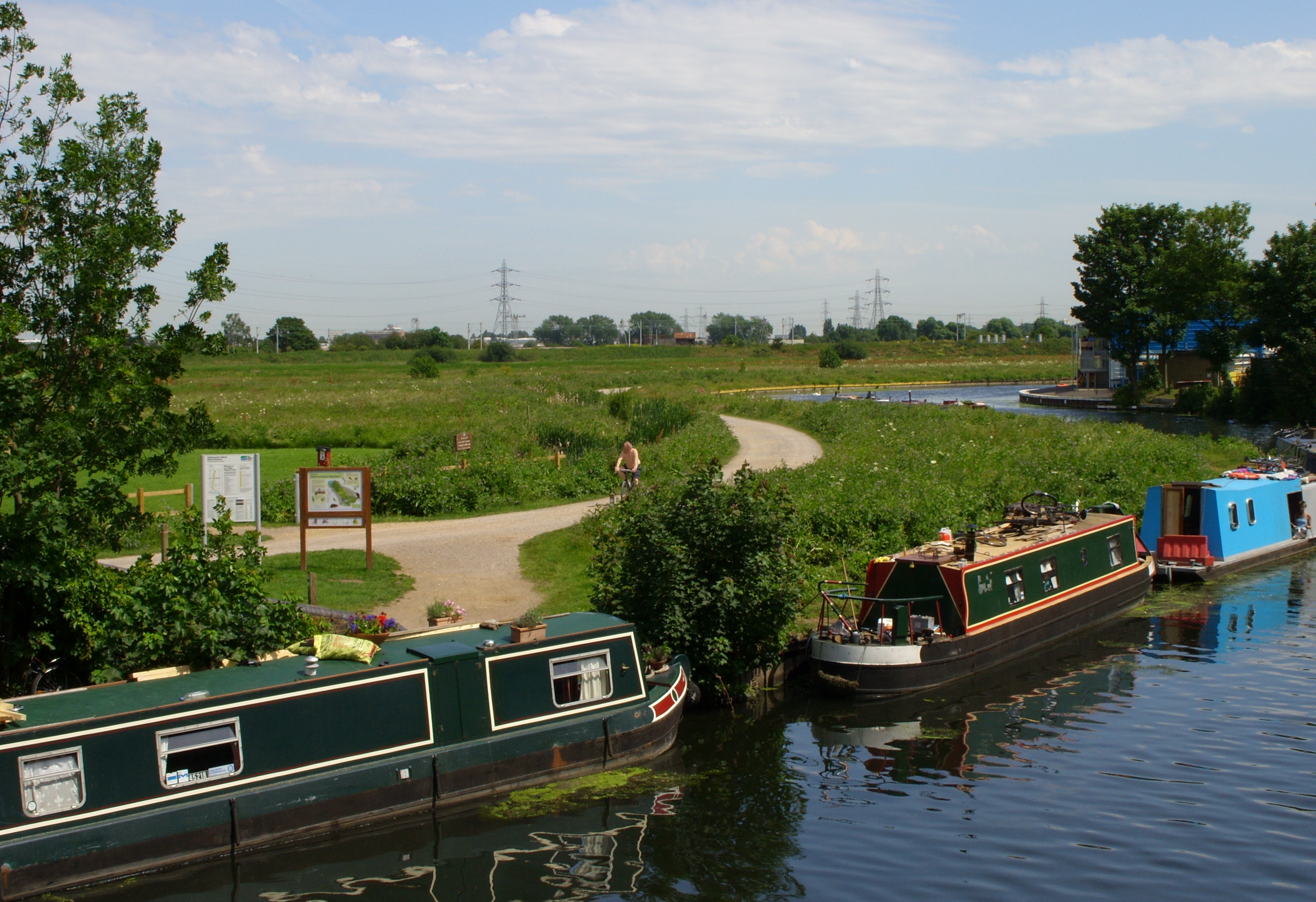
Walthamstow Marshes

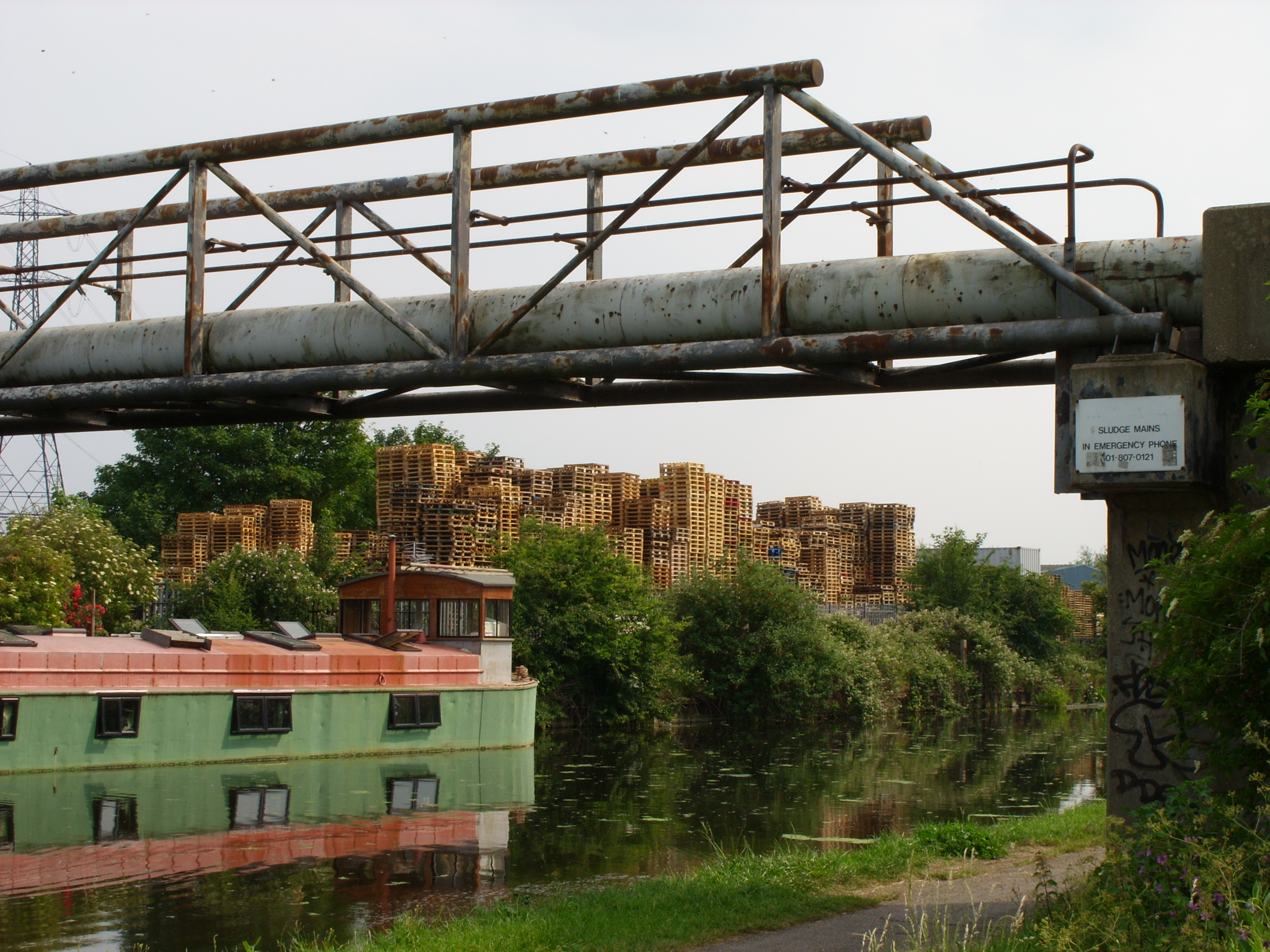
The park in Tottenham

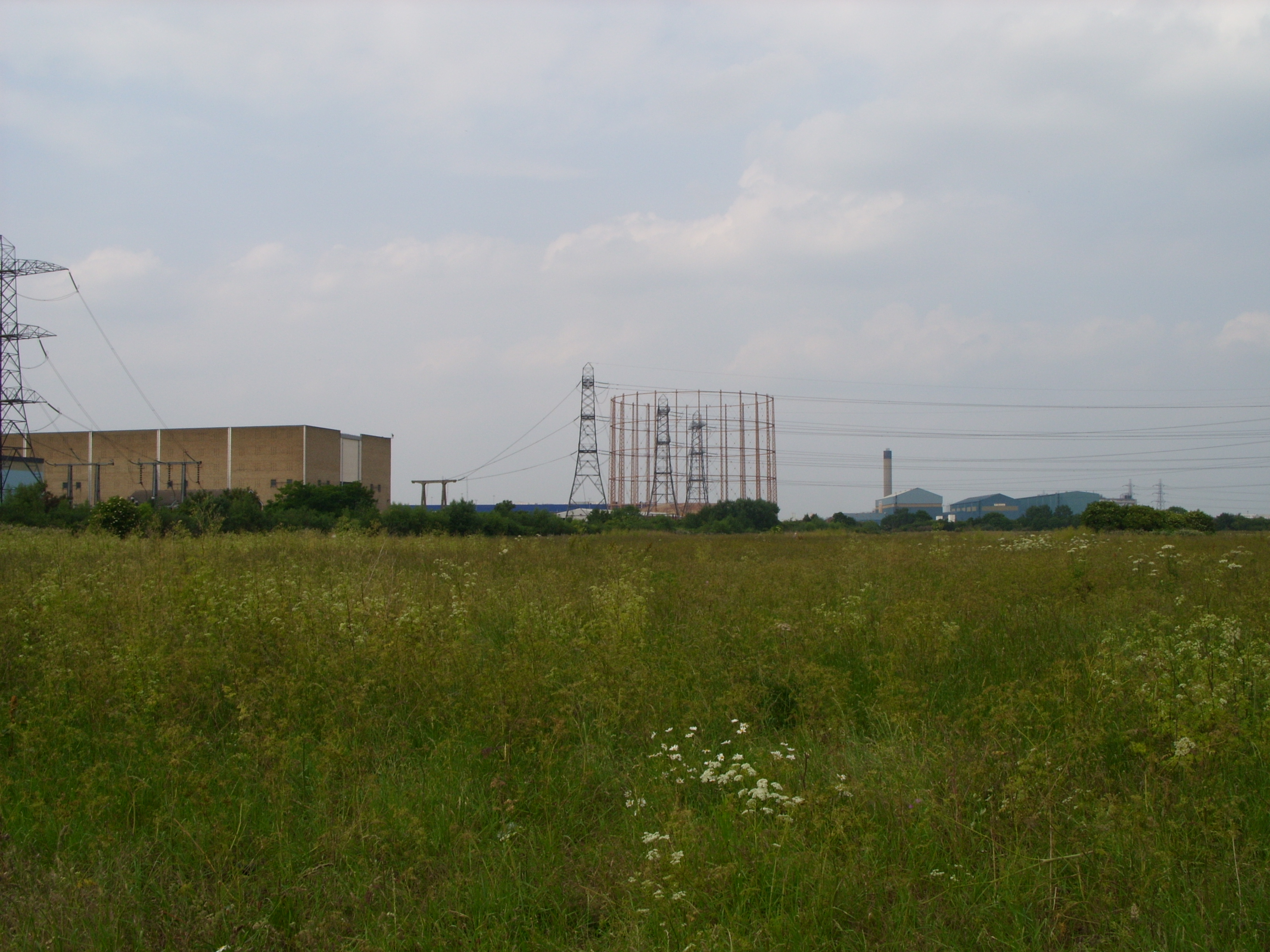
Looking north from Tottenham Marshes towards Edmonton

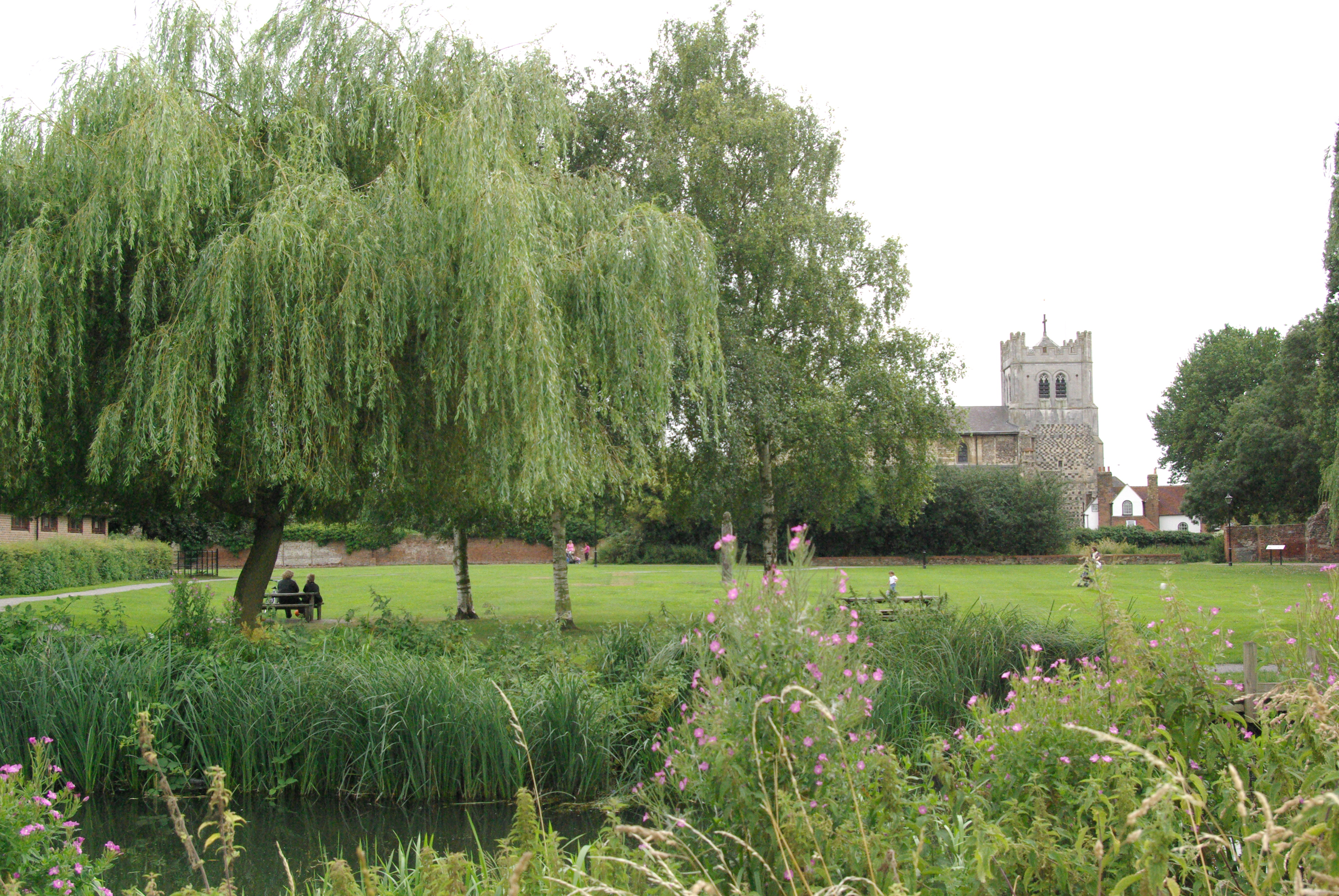
View across Cornmill Stream towards Waltham Abbey

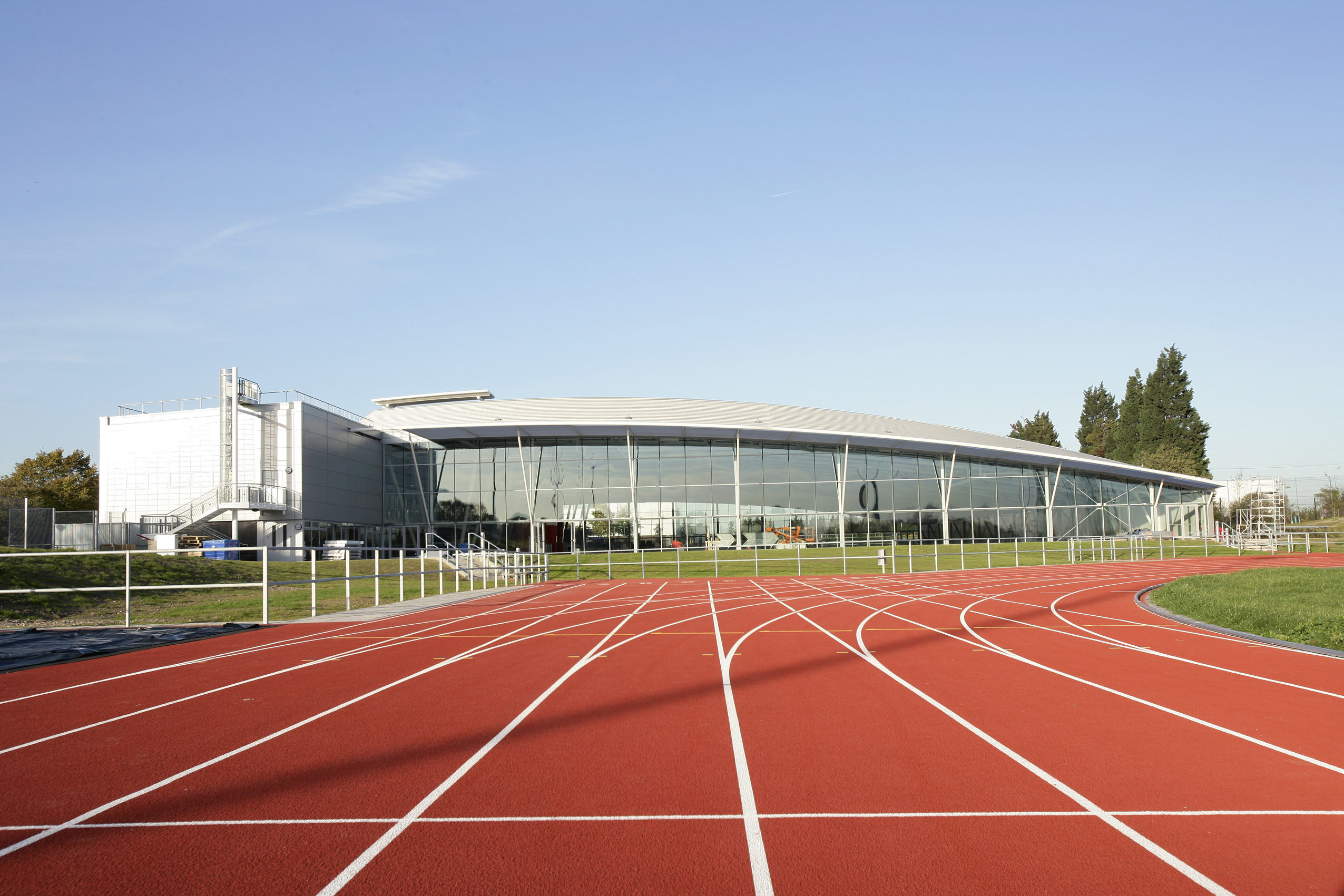
View of the award-winning Lee Valley Athletics Centre

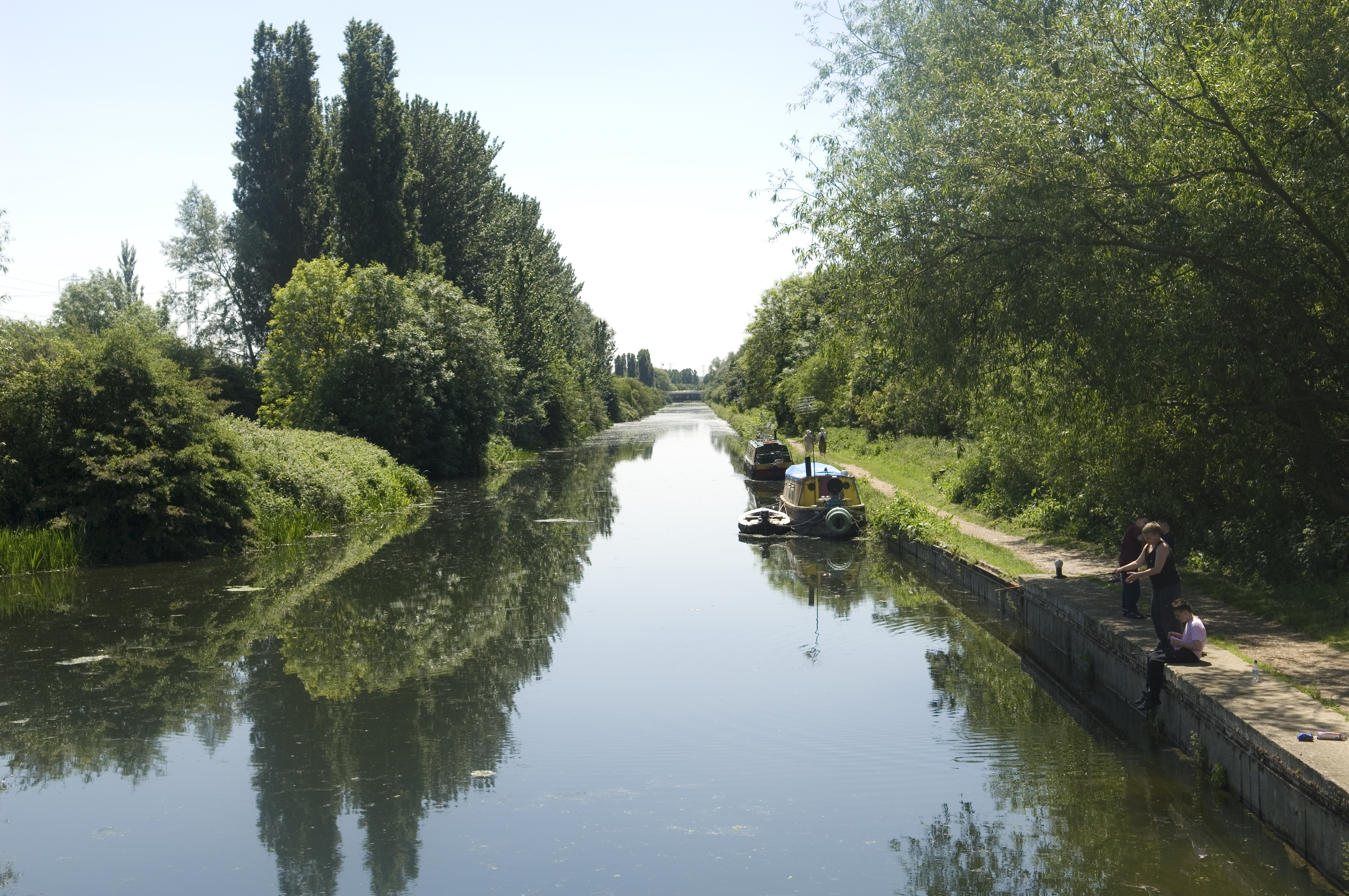
View of the River Lee Navigation flowing through the River Lee Country Park

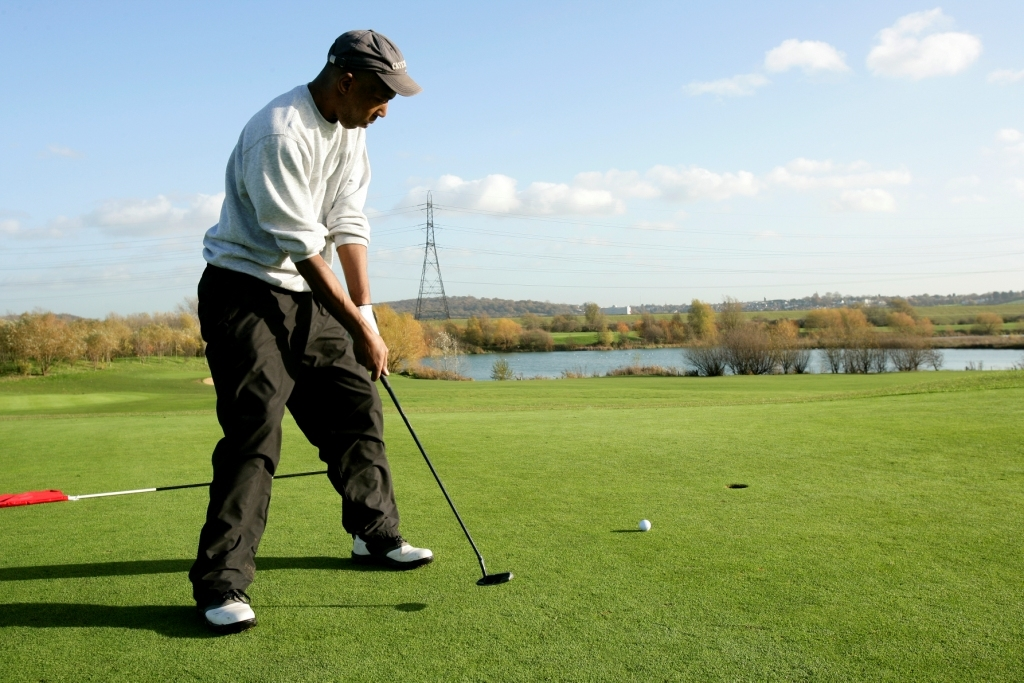
Golfer at Lee Valley Golf Course

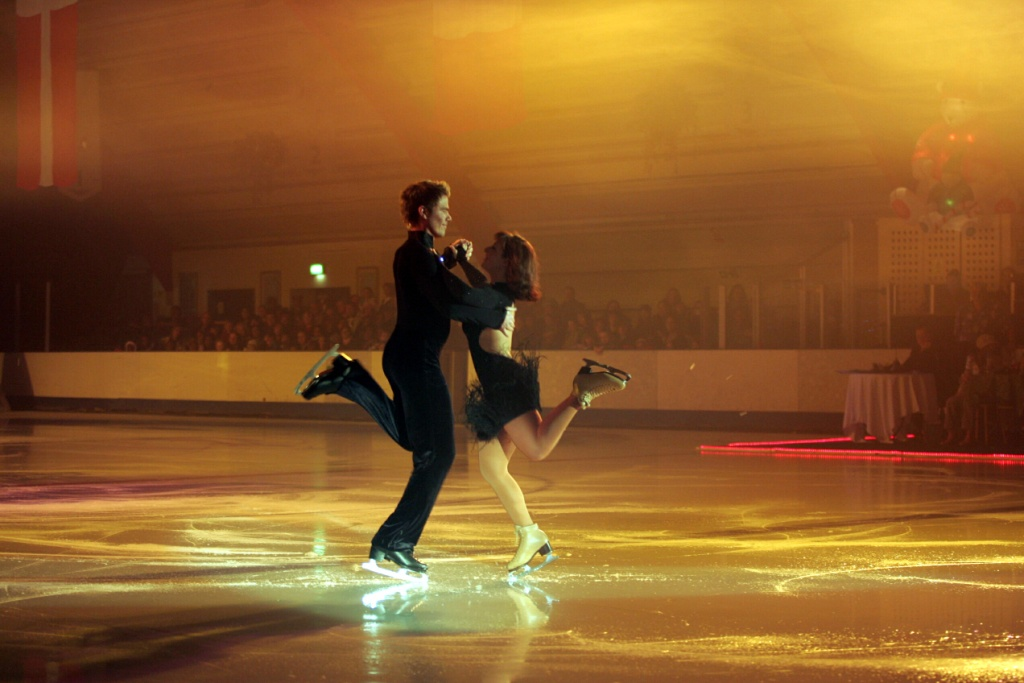
Ice skaters at Lee Valley Ice Centre Christmas show

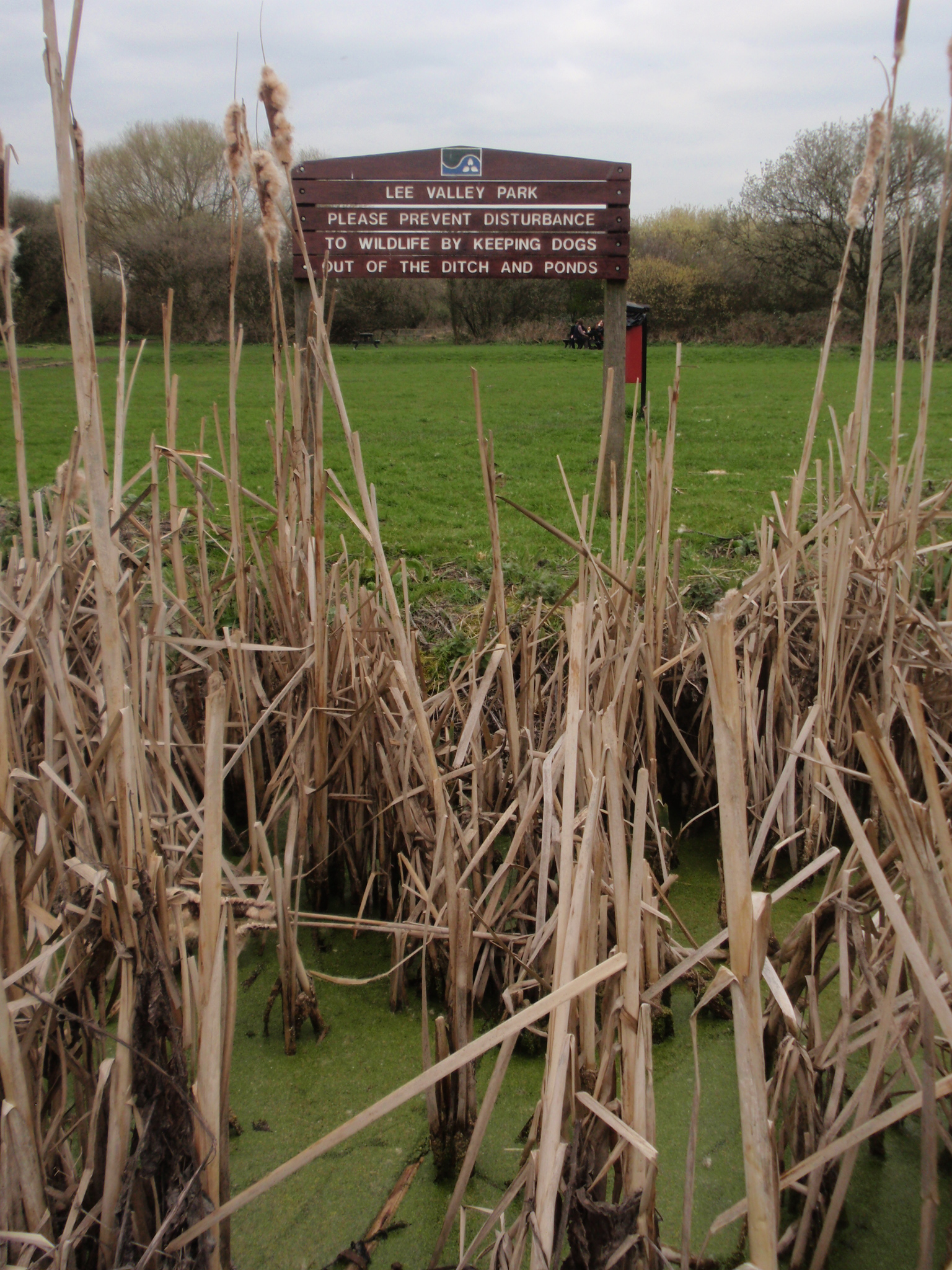
Sign of Park

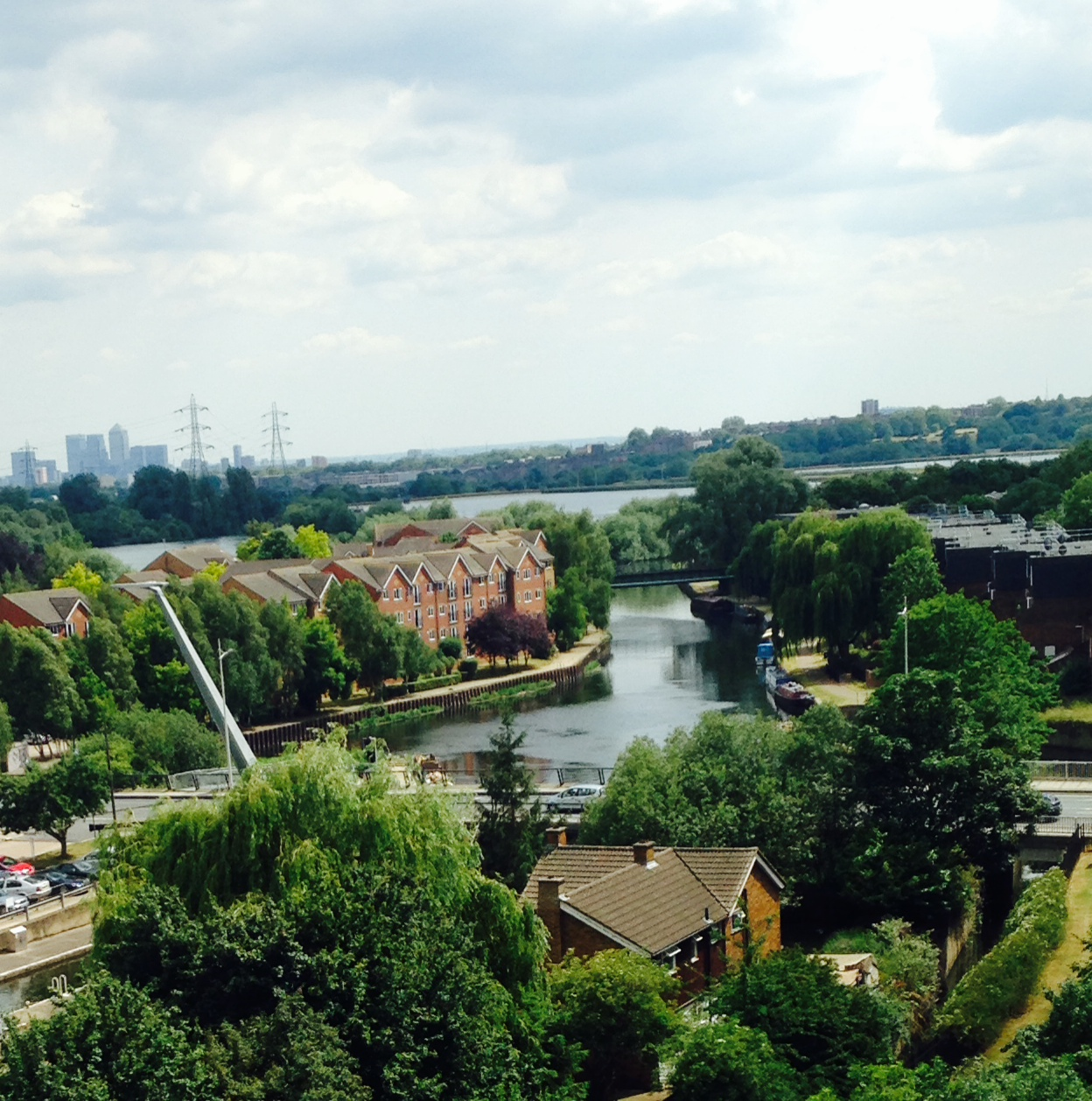
Lee Valley Park Marshes from Tottenham Hale

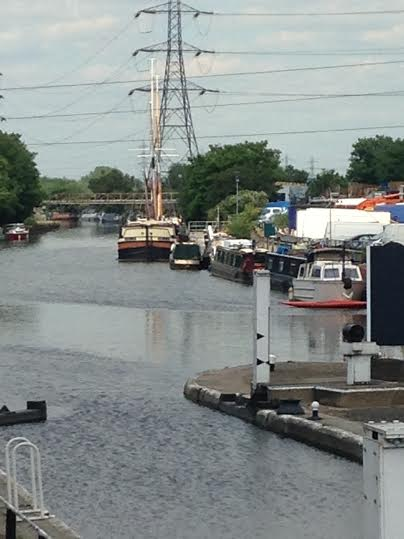
View from the Tottenham Hale bridge in Lee Valley Park
