= Bow Creek Ecology Park =

Park in Newham, East London

Coordinates: 51.5121°N 0.0034°E

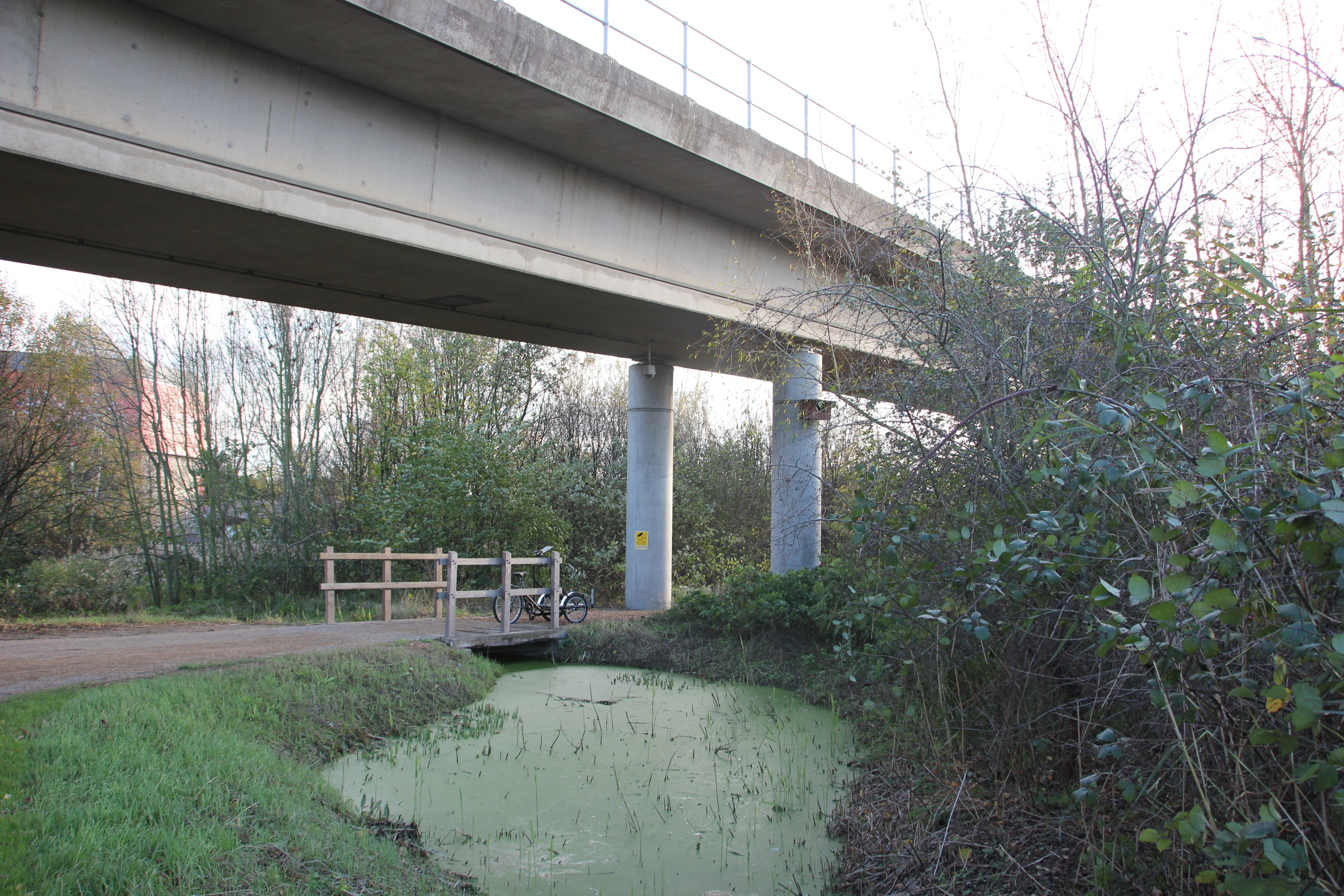
Bow Creek Ecology Park

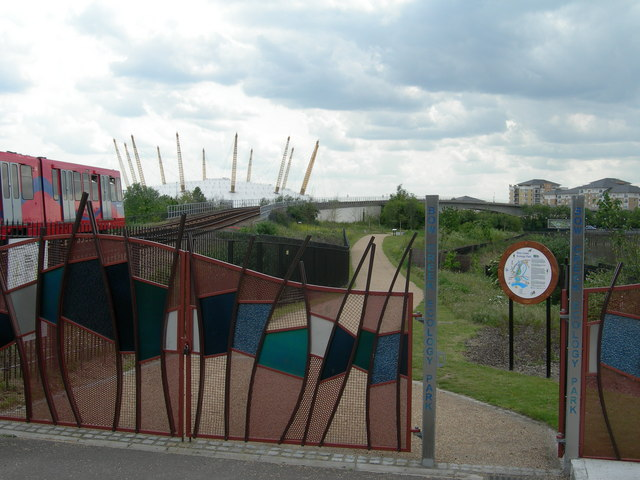
Park entrance

Bow Creek Ecology Park is a small open space along Bow Creek tidal estuary of the River Lea in Canning Town in Newham, in east London. It is operated by the regional Lee Valley Park system.

== Description ==
Bow Creek Ecology Park is a small park running alongside and underneath the Docklands Light Railway near Canning Town Station. The Bow Creek reach of the lower River Lea is a tidal estuary here in Lower Lea Valley.

The park features small streams and ponds, an outdoor classroom, footpaths, observation points, and seating. It is an important resource for local education.

== History ==
The park was created by the London Docklands Development Corporation (LDDC) in 1994, after a survey identified rare and unusual plant species in the area, some presumed carried in by shipping, such as Hairy Buttercup (Ranunculus sardous), Walthamstow Cress, and Unreel's Wormwood.

During its final preparatory stages, ahead of its opening the park was the topic of an episode of a BBC educational series for schools called 'Science Zone', hosted by children's television presenter Steve Johnson.

It was opened in 1996 by Eastenders actress Michelle Collins, host Steve Johnson, London Docklands Development Corporation project manager and ecologist Kieron Murphy, and local children from Woolmore Primary School. A recording of the opening and aerial view of the finished park featured at the end of programme.

The Park has won a Green Flag Award for the fourth year in 2010, and was also nominated for the UK Landscape Award 2010.
