= Edward Augustus Bowles =

British horticulturist (1865–1954)

- Born: 14 May 1865; Enfield, London, England
- Died: 7 May 1954 (aged 88)
- Occupations: Horticulturalist, plantsman, garden writer

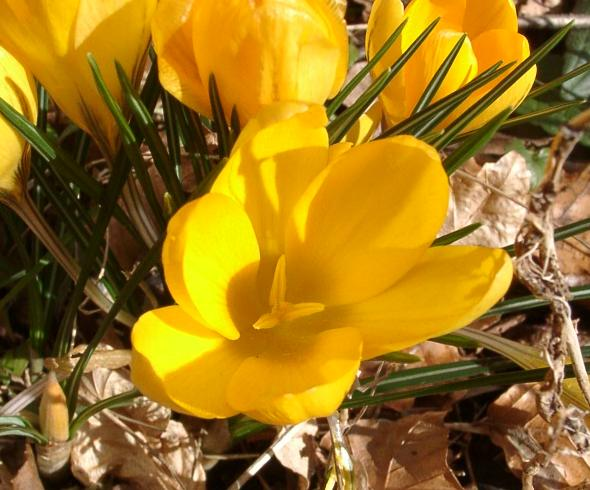
Crocus E A Bowles

Edward Augustus (Gus or Gussie) Bowles VMH (14 May 1865 – 7 May 1954) was a British horticulturalist, plantsman and garden writer. He developed an important garden at Myddelton House, his lifelong home at Bulls Cross in Enfield, Middlesex and his name has been preserved in many varieties of plant. The standard author abbreviation Bowles is used to indicate this person as the author when citing a botanical name.

== Background ==
E. A. Bowles was born at his family's home, Myddelton House, in Enfield. He was of Huguenot descent through his maternal great-grandmother and his father, Henry Carington Bowles Bowles (sic) (1830–1918), son of Anne Sarah Bowles, who had inherited Myddelton House, and her husband Edward Treacher. Henry Carington Treacher adopted the surname Bowles in 1852 for inheritance purposes and married E.A. Bowles's mother, Cornelia Kingdom (1831–1911) in 1856. H.C Bowles was Chairman of the New River Company, which until 1904 controlled the artificial waterway that flowed past Myddelton House, bringing water to London from the River Lea.

Through his elder brother Henry, who after 1894 lived at neighbouring Forty Hall, Bowles was the great-uncle of Andrew Parker Bowles (born 1939), whose first wife, Camilla Shand, became Duchess of Cornwall on her marriage to Charles, Prince of Wales in 2005 and Queen in 2023.

== Education and career ==
Described as "too delicate for public school", Bowles spent much of his childhood at Myddelton before reading divinity at Jesus College, Cambridge. He had wanted to enter the church, but family circumstances, including the death of a brother and sister from tuberculosis in a three-month period of 1887, militated against this; so he remained at Myddelton and, in the words of one historian, "devoted himself to social work, painting, and natural history, particularly entomology".

Bowles transformed the garden at Myddelton and, as a keen traveller, especially to Europe and North Africa, brought home with him many specimens of plant. Such was his collecting zeal that, by the turn of the 20th century, he was growing over 130 species of colchicum and crocus. He also took a great interest in hardy cacti and succulents, admiring their "strange beauty" and protective spines. Many of the foreign expeditions were timed to mitigate the symptoms of acute hay fever, with Alpine or other mountainous regions being favoured destinations in late spring. Bowles's gardening mentor was Canon Henry Nicholson Ellacombe (1822–1916), Rector of Bitton, Gloucestershire, who wrote a number of books about gardening, including plant lore in English literature.

Bowles inherited Myddelton on his father's death in 1918, but initially found this a mixed blessing, writing the following year to his friend and fellow horticulturalist William Robinson that, with a life interest in the property, he was unable to sell and yet found his income insufficient to maintain it to "as it used to be kept". At the time he was contemplating turning Myddelton into a "semi-wild garden".

In 1908 Bowles was elected to the Council of the Royal Horticultural Society (RHS), whose grounds at Wisley, Surrey, now contain a memorial garden to him. Bowles received the society's highest award, the Victoria Medal of Honour, in 1916 and was a Vice-President from 1926 until his death almost thirty years later. In 1923 he received the RHS's Veitch Memorial Medal. RHS colleagues knew him as "Bowley".

=== Myddelton House ===
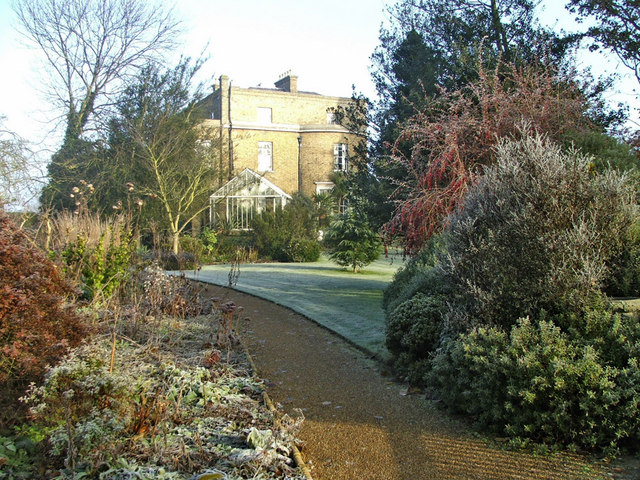
The gardens at Myddelton House in winter

The garden at Myddelton House, which has been subject to considerable renovation in the early 21st century, is open to the public and contains a museum dedicated to Bowles's life and work. Many of the features that he created remain, including the rock garden (though this is now largely wild), the wisteria that he planted across a bridge that once crossed the New River, and his so-called "lunatic asylum" of horticultural oddities, such as the corkscrew hazel (Corylus avellana 'Contorta'), that he developed after abandoning plans to construct a Japanese garden. The old Enfield market cross was salvaged to become the centrepiece of the rose garden, while two lead ostriches, dating from 1724, that once stood beside the wisteria bridge, have been restored after years of vandalism and are now housed in the museum. On one of the walls overlooking the kitchen garden, Bowles's initials that he carved in 1887 can still be seen.

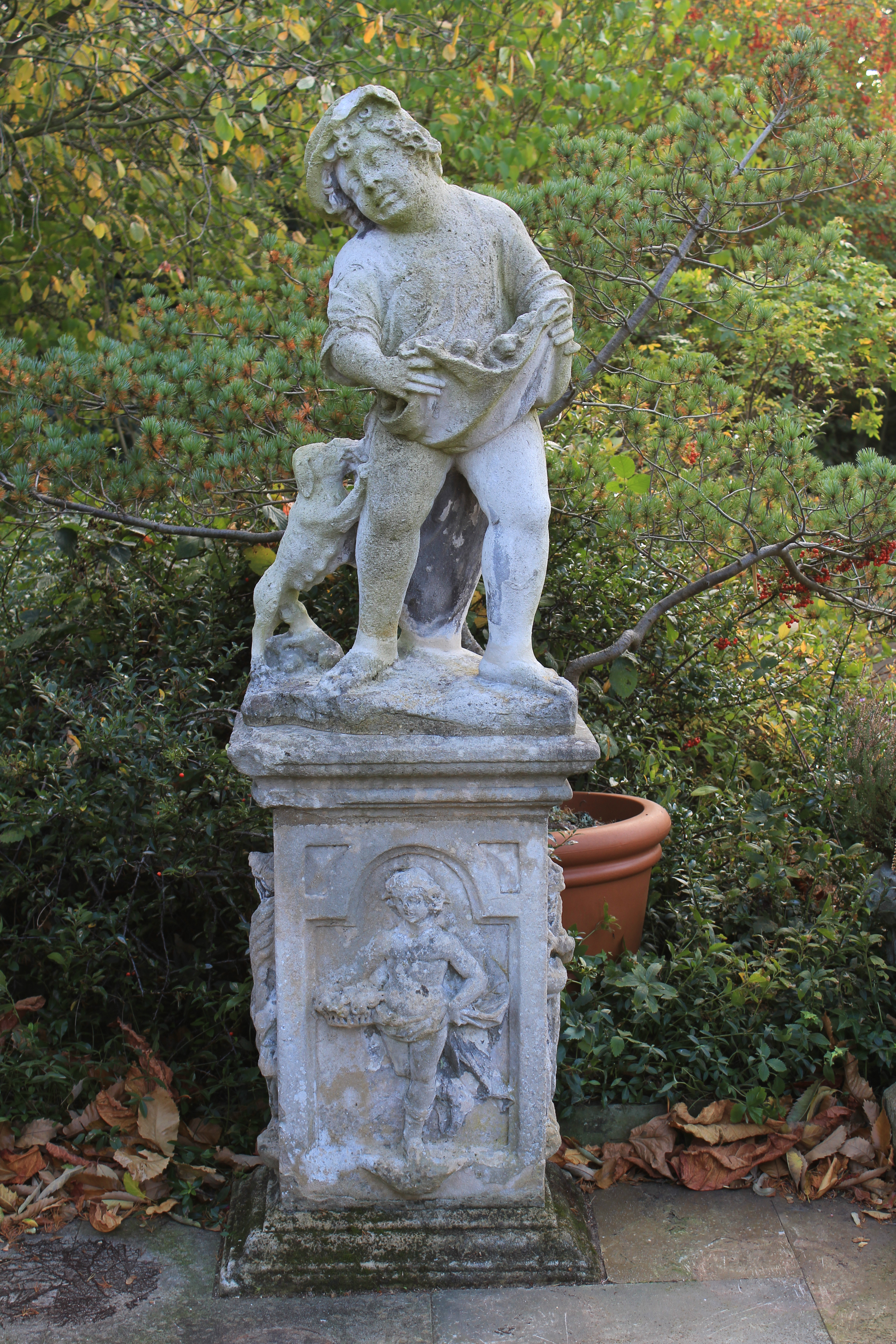
Statuette of a young boy holding apron with puppies (The lake terrace)

Two clumps have been maintained of the highly invasive Japanese knot weed, whose architectural qualities Bowles admired. Bowles also grew a gigantic gunnera, which flourished at Myddelton despite its hard water and dry, gravelly soil, and dwarfed a schoolgirl named Miss Malby whom Bowles photographed beside it in 1927. More generally, he had an eye for unusual and uncommon plants, one of his favourites being yellowroot (Xanthorhiza simplicissima), which is rarely grown in British gardens, but whose "quaint beauty" he appreciated. Among Bowles's methods of pest control was to go out at night with a torch and a hatpin to eradicate slugs.

=== Visitors and horticultural contacts ===
Bowles received many distinguished visitors from the gardening world: for example, the great planting designer Gertrude Jekyll came to Myddelton twice in 1910, while Bowles was a guest at Jekyll's Munstead Wood. An article in the Gardener's Magazine in 1910 observed "it would be difficult to imagine anything more delightful, floriculturally speaking, than to spend an hour or so with Mr. Bowles." A so-called "tulip tea" was held annually at Myddelton to celebrate Bowles's birthday in early May. This usually coincided with the flowering of beds along his Tulip Terrace, which, given the tulip's decline in popularity since its mid-Victorian heyday, made him one of what he described in 1914, with reference to fellow devotees, as the "noble little band who keep up its cultivation [and] are doing a great work for future gardeners".

Bowles was also the frequent recipient of specimens from other plantsmen. For example, in 1921 Sir Frederick Moore, director of the National Botanic Gardens at Glasnevin, near Dublin, Ireland, sent him a collection of hellebores that have thrived at Myddelton. These included a variety that became known as 'Bowles' Yellow' (although it appears that differing strains originating from Myddelton may have been distributed under this name, while other named varieties may have been descended from one or more of these). Stories differ as to why Bowles named a particular snowdrop Galanthus plicatus 'Warham Rectory', but, according to one version, flowers of it were sent to him in 1916 by Charles Tilton Digby, Rector of Warham, Norfolk. Bowles named another galanthus 'Benhall Beauty' after the village near Saxmundham, Suffolk where it was grown by John Gray (died 1952), a noted snowdrop specialist who gave his name to the variety G. 'John Gray'. Another galanthus, 'Mrs Thompson', was named after a lady from Escrick in Yorkshire who sent samples to a meeting of the RHS Scientific Committee that Bowles chaired in 1950.

Others shared with Bowles information and views about horticulture and botany: in 1929 Frank Anthony Hampton (a physicist who wrote gardening books under the name of Jason Hill) corresponded about some twigs sent to him by Gertrude Jekyll to support the view that the pollen flowers of mistletoe carried a scent that was missing in fertilised ones.

=== Mentor and talent spotter ===
Through the RHS, and in other ways, Bowles did much to encourage other gardeners. Among his protégées was an Enfield neighbour, Frances Perry (née Everett), who gained particular distinction as a horticultural writer, broadcaster and educationalist. Another, Richard Durant (Dick) Trotter (1887–1968), who became a leading banker and Treasurer of the RHS, travelled with Bowles to the Alps and Greece in the 1920s. Trotter was Treasurer of the RHS 1929–32, 1933–38 and 1943–48. He became a Director of the National Provincial Bank and later Chairman of the Alliance Assurance Company. Bowles often visited Trotter's garden at Leith Vale, Surrey and his daughter Elizabeth Parker-Jervis (1931–2010), herself a redoubtable gardener, claimed to have been "brought up on Bowles's knee".

Bowles had a good eye for talent: in the early 1930s he became acquainted with William Stearn, then a young assistant in the Cambridge University bookshop Bowes and Bowes, and recommended him to be Librarian of the RHS, a post he held for almost twenty years. Just after the Second World War, Bowles chaired the panel that selected William Gregor MacKenzie (Bill MacKenzie) as curator of the Chelsea Physic Garden. MacKenzie remained at Chelsea until 1973, initially restoring the garden from wartime neglect and then reinvigorating it as a centre for horticulture.

=== Publications ===
Bowles wrote a number of books about horticulture, notably My Garden in Spring, My Garden in Summer and My Garden in Autumn and Winter, all of which were published (1914–15) around the beginning of the First World War. The preface to the first of these by Bowles's friend Reginald Farrer, with whom he often travelled abroad, contained some comments about showy rock gardens which were taken as personal criticism by Sir Frank Crisp, the eccentric millionaire owner of Friar Park, Henley-on-Thames, and Ellen Willmott, creator of a steep, rocky garden at Ventimiglia on the Italian Riviera, who had known Gertrude Jekyll since 1873 and, like Bowles, was a leading figure in the RHS. Farrer, who was widely published and candid about his likes and dislikes, was thought to have had in mind in particular Crisp's Alpine garden which contained a miniature version of the Matterhorn created from 20,000 tons of granite brought from Yorkshire. This led Willmott to circulate a uncomplimentary pamphlet about Bowles and his garden at the second Chelsea Flower Show in 1914, thereby escalating a row which, however, was patched up the following year, when Bowles invited Willmot to Myddelton House. Ellen Willmott and Gertrude Jekyll were the first female recipients of the RHS's Victoria Medal of Honour, instituted in 1897 and, as noted, bestowed on Bowles in 1916. One of Jekyll's biographers wrote that Willmott "was in many ways as unusual as Gertrude".

Bowles's more specialised works included his handbooks on crocuses (1924) and narcissi (1934), which contained his own illustrations. Material that he had collected for a monograph on snowdrops and snowflakes was incorporated after his death in a book for the RHS by Sir Frederick Stern (1884–1967), creator of Highdown Gardens in Worthing, West Sussex.

== Death and legacy ==
Bowles continued to chair committees of the RHS until a few weeks before his death in 1954. His ashes were scattered on the rock garden at Myddelton House. Bowles had no family of his own and the house and gardens passed to the University of London. They are now owned and managed by the Lee Valley Regional Park Authority. The bulk of Bowles's correspondence is held by the RHS's Lindley Library. A charity, known as the E.A. Bowles of Myddelton House Society, seeks to maintain interest in both the man and his work and, since the fiftieth anniversary of his death in 2004, has sponsored a biennial studentship in his name in conjunction with the RHS. At its first annual general meeting in 1993, Andrew Parker-Bowles was elected president of the society, with Frances Perry (who died in October 1993) and Elizabeth Parker-Jervis as vice-presidents.

=== Named varieties ===
Bowles gave his name to upwards of forty varieties of plant, and there are others that originated with him. For example, he named a hellebore 'Gerrard Parker' after a local art master, Crocus tommasinianus 'Bobbo' after the boy who first spotted it and Rosmarinus officinalis 'Miss Jessopp's Upright' (Miss Jessopp's Upright Rosemary) after a gardening neighbour, Euphemia Jessopp, for whom he also named the small white Crocus x jessoppiae in 1924. Erysimum 'Bowles' Mauve' was among "200 plants for 200 years" chosen by the RHS to mark its bicentenary in 2004 and, to coincide with the hundredth anniversary of the Chelsea Flower Show in 2013, was shortlisted (from among introductions between 1973 and 1983) as one of ten "plants of the centenary". Other significant introductions included Viola 'Bowles' Black', cotton lavender 'Edward Bowles' (Santolina pinnata subsp. neopolitana), and Bowles' golden sedge (Carex stricta 'Aurea'), which he found on Wicken Fen and has been described by another doyen of plantsmen, Christopher Lloyd, as "a plant to treasure, its colour changing in unexpected ways". Vita Sackville-West cited the yellow and brown Crocus chrysanthus 'E.A. Bowles' as among the first bulbs to flower in her garden at Sissinghurst in January or early February, while, in the nuttery there, Bowles' golden grass (Milium effusum 'Aureum') is interspersed in spring with wood anemones and white bluebells. Another spring plant, the slow growing Muscari (grape hyacinth) 'Bowles's Peacock', was commended by Richard Hobbs, holder of the British National Plant Collection of Muscari, as "charming [and] small ... but [with] superb peacock-blue flowers, which in a pot are easily admired at close quarters". The vigorous Galanthus plicatus 'Augustus' was named for Bowles by the plantswoman Amy Doncaster. Some other plants bearing his name have been introduced since his death. An example is Phlomis 'Edward Bowles', launched by Hiller Nursuries in 1967, which apparently derives from seeds from Myddelton. In February 2011 a single bulb of the pure white snowdrop G. p. 'E A Bowles', discovered at Myddelton in 2002, was sold on the internet auction site eBay for a record price of £357. This surpassed by almost £100 the previous record for a snowdrop bulb, set in 2008.

== Bibliography ==
- Bowles, Edward Augustus (1914a). My Garden in Spring. London: T.C. & E.C. Jack.
- —— (1914b). My Garden in Summer. London: T.C. & E.C. Jack. OCLC 14155386.
  - reprinted, with a new preface and nomenclature update: —— (1998). My Garden in Summer. Portland, Oregon: Timber Press.
- —— (1915). My Garden in Autumn and Winter. London: T.C. & E.C. Jack. OCLC 16850252.
  - reprint: —— (1998b). My Garden in Autum and Winter. Portland, Oregon: Timber Press. ISBN 9780881924596.
- —— (1924). A handbook of Crocus and Colchicum for gardeners. London: Martin Hopkinson & Cie.
  - 2nd. ed. —— (1952). A handbook of Crocus and Colchicum for gardeners. London: The Garden Book Club. OCLC 499807887.
  - 3rd. ed. —— (1985). A handbook of Crocus and Colchicum for gardeners. London: Waterstone. ISBN 9780947752262.

== Sources ==
- Allan, Mea (1973). E. A. Bowles & his garden at Myddelton House [1865-1954]. London: Faber and Faber. ISBN 978-0571103065.
- Hewitt, Bryan (1997). The Crocus King: E.A. Bowles of Myddelton House. Ware, Hertfordshire: Rockingham Press. ISBN 9781904851707. 2nd enlarged edition 2018, The Crocus King: E.A. Bowles of Myddelton House—The Gardens Restored (ISBN 1904851703).
- Massingham, Betty (1982). A Century of Gardeners. London: Faber and Faber. ISBN 978-0-571-11811-3.
- Stearn, William T. (2004). "Bowles, Edward Augustus". Oxford Dictionary of National Biography (online ed.). Oxford University Press. doi:10.1093/ref:odnb/57209. (Subscription, Wikipedia Library access or UK public library membership required.)
