= Myddelton House =

Listed 19th century villa in Bulls Cross, Enfield, London, England

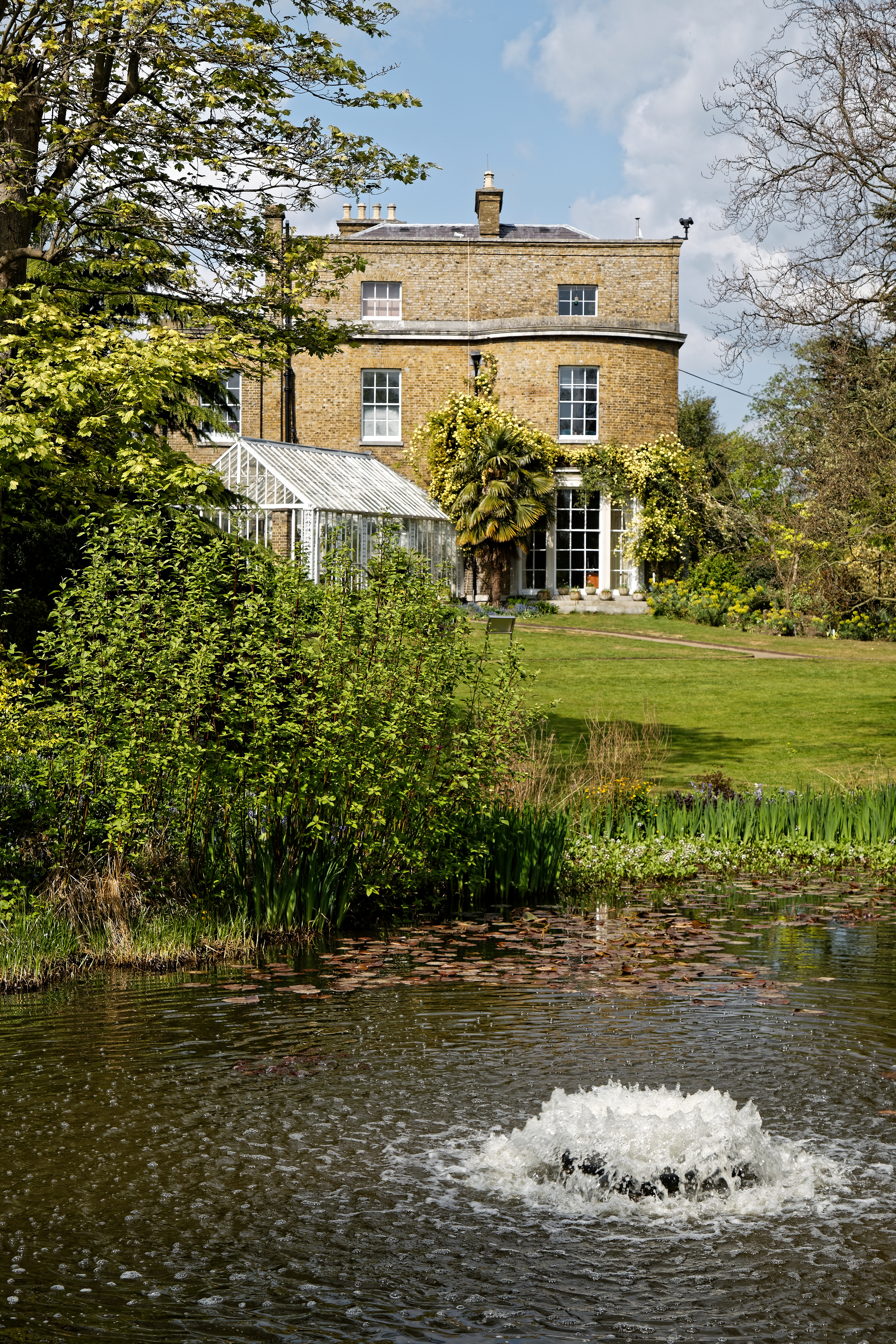
- Myddelton House from the lake
- Interactive map of the Myddelton House area

General information
- Type: Villa
- Architectural style: Regency
- Location: Bulls Cross, Enfield, London, England
- Coordinates: 51.675°N 0.061°W
- Construction started: 1818
- Governing body: Lee Valley Regional Park Authority

Listed Building – Grade II
- Official name: Myddelton House
- Designated: 19 March 1951
- Reference no.: 1078893

National Register of Historic Parks and Gardens
- Official name: Myddelton House Gardens
- Designated: 1 October 1987
- Reference no.: 1000243

Listed Building – Grade II
- Official name: Lake Terrace in the grounds of Myddelton House
- Designated: 15 August 1979
- Reference no.: 1358715

Listed Building – Grade II
- Official name: Market Cross in the grounds of Myddelton House
- Designated: 15 August 1979
- Reference no.: 1079478

Listed Building – Grade II
- Official name: Stable Block to north of Myddelton House
- Designated: 31 January 1974
- Reference no.: 1359004

Myddelton House is a Regency villa in Bulls Cross, Enfield, London, England. Dating from 1819, the building is enclosed by an 8-acre garden that was developed in the 18th, 19th and early 20th centuries. In the late 19th century, the house came into the possession of Edward Augustus Bowles, the "Crocus King", a notable horticulturalist, plantsman and garden writer. Over the next 50 years he created an important garden on the site. After his death in 1954, the house and some of the estate, including the major parts of the garden, was acquired by the Lee Valley Regional Park Authority for use as their headquarters. The house continues to serve that purpose and the gardens are regularly open to the public. Myddelton House is a Grade II listed building and the gardens are listed, also at Grade II, on the Register of Historic Parks and Gardens of Special Historic Interest in England.

== History ==
The Myddelton Estate stands in the grounds of the Tudor Elsyng Palace, home of Thomas Lovell during the reign of Henry VIII, and a favoured residence of the king and of his daughter Elizabeth I. The palace fell out of favour during the reign of James VI and I and was largely demolished by the 1650s. A new mansion, Forty Hall was built in the grounds in the 1620s, and in 1724 a part of the estate was bought by Michael Garnault. In 1818, Henry Carrington Bowles, who had married the Garnault heiress, Anne, constructed a new house on this portion of the estate, (Note: The builders were George Ferry and John Wallen.) named Myddelton House in honour of Hugh Myddelton (1560-1631), the builder of the New River, an artificial waterway which supplied London with drinking water and which ran through the grounds of the Forty Hall estate. A later descendent, Edward Augustus Bowles inherited Myddelton House in the 1890s, while his brother, Henry, was bought Forty Hall by their father, Henry Carrington Bowles Bowles. Over the next half century Edward Bowles developed a major garden on the Myddelton Estate, drawing on his expertise as a plantsman, horticulturalist and prolific author.

On his death in 1954, Bowles left the house and gardens jointly to the Royal Free Hospital School of Medicine and the University of London School of Pharmacy. In 1968, the house and the majority of the estate, including the gardens, were sold to the Lee Valley Regional Park Authority, the body with responsibility of the operation of Lee Valley Park. The house remains their headquarters, and the gardens are regularly open to the public.

== Architecture and description ==
The main house is of two storeys with attics above. A three-storey wing is a later addition. The construction material is London stock brick, with ashlar dressings. Some original interiors remain. The house is a Grade II listed building.

== Gardens ==
The 8-acre garden includes a wide range of plants, some collected by Bowles on his travels overseas and many gifted by other plant enthusiasts. Specialities include snowdrops and crocuses, Bowles being nicknamed "the Crocus King". They contain several national plant collections. (Note: The national collections include that of the bearded iris.) Other features include vegetable and cut-flower gardens, the Victorian Enfield Market cross which Bowles saved from destruction and relocated to the gardens, and a rockery where Bowles' ashes were scattered. Bowles also delighted in collecting unusual specimens, which he planted out in an area of the garden he called 'The Lunatic Asylum'. In 2011 work was completed on a £700,000 restoration of the gardens, with funding from the National Lottery Heritage Fund.

== Gallery ==
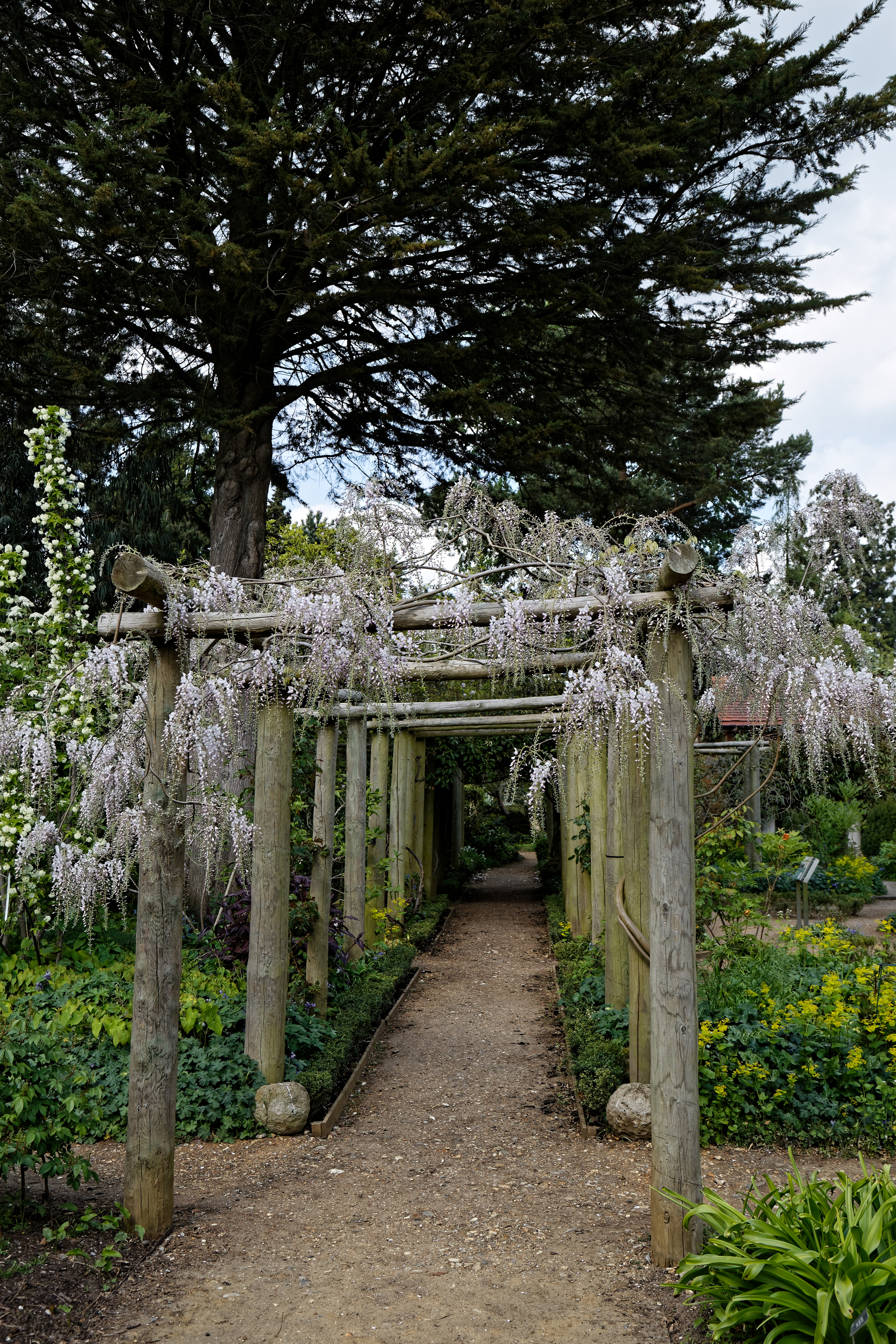
Pergola

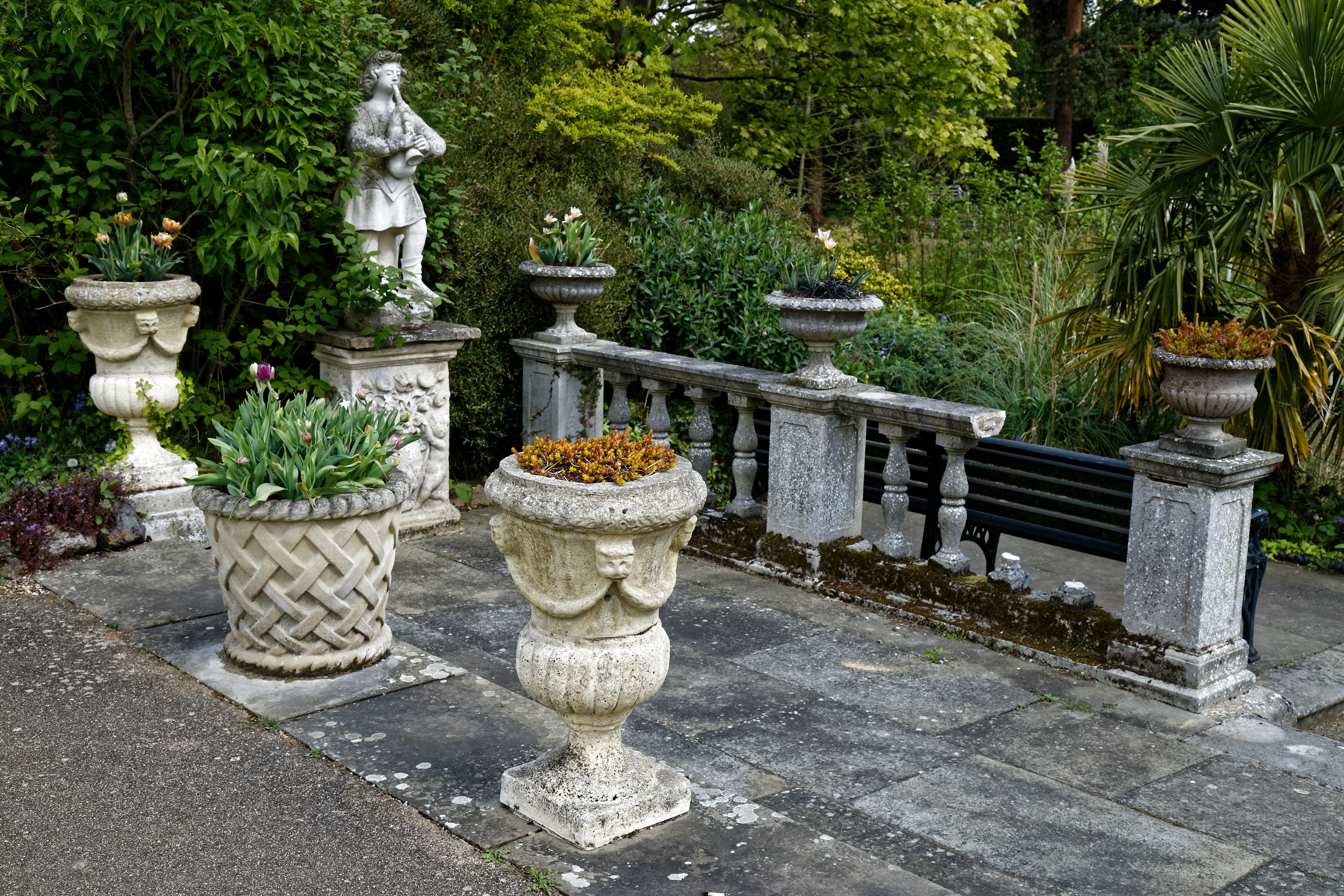
The Lake Terrace

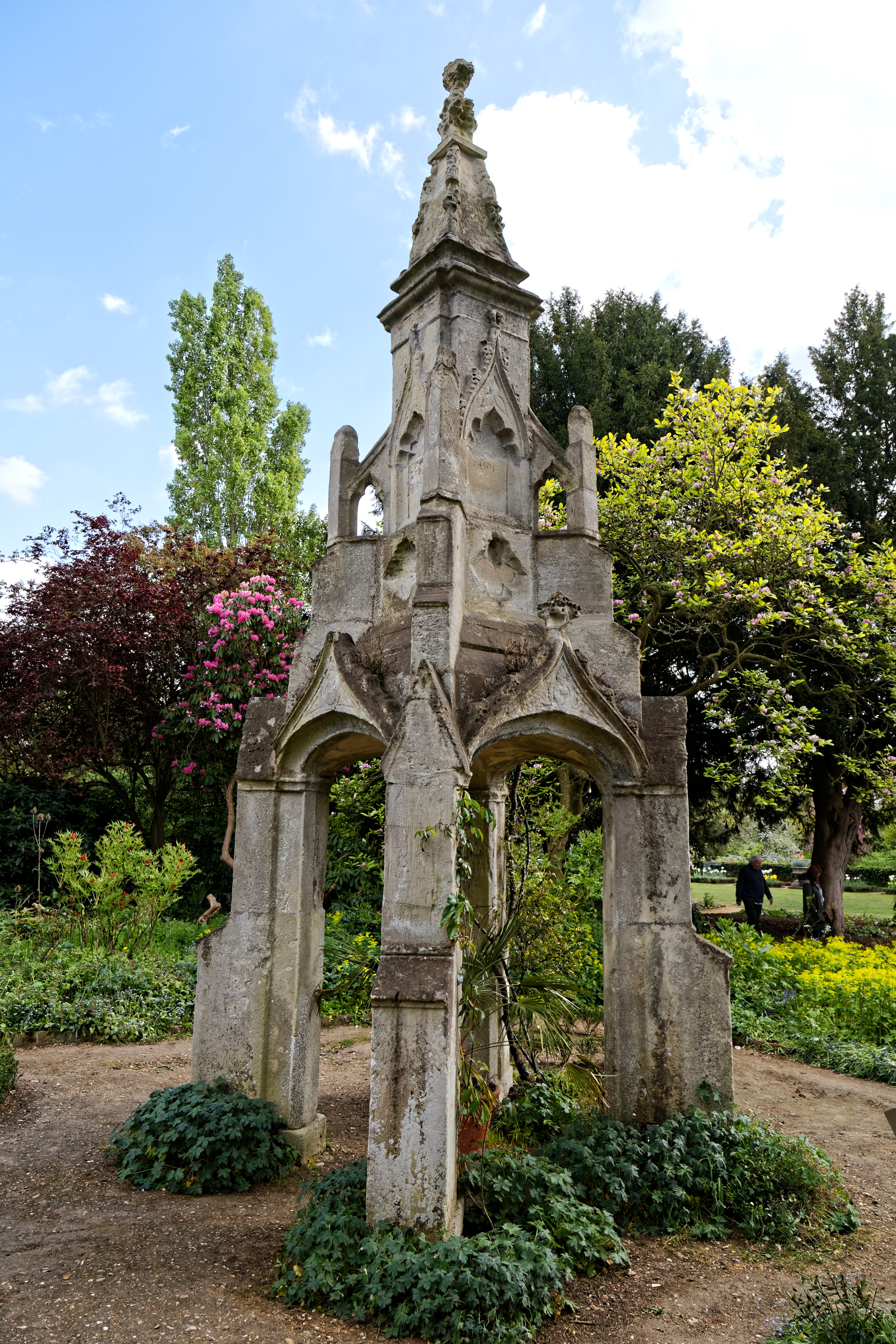
Enfield Market cross which Bowles rescued from destruction and rebuilt in the garden

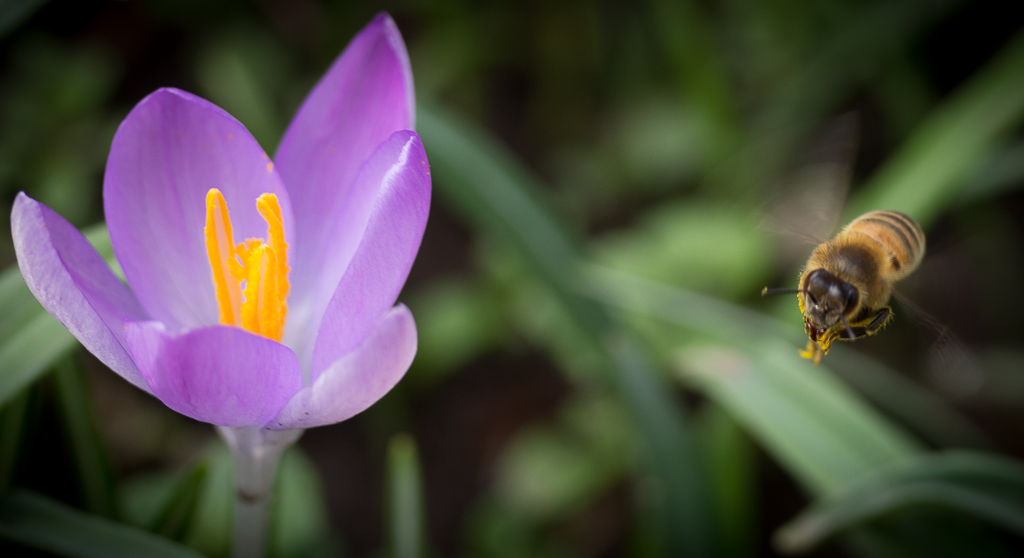
Bowles, the "Crocus King"

== Sources ==
- Cherry, Bridget; Pevsner, Nikolaus (2002). London 4: North. The Buildings of England. New Haven, US and London: Yale University Press. ISBN 978-0-300-09653-8.
- Media related to Myddelton House at Wikimedia Commons
