= Lee Valley Regional Park Authority =

UK Regional Park authority

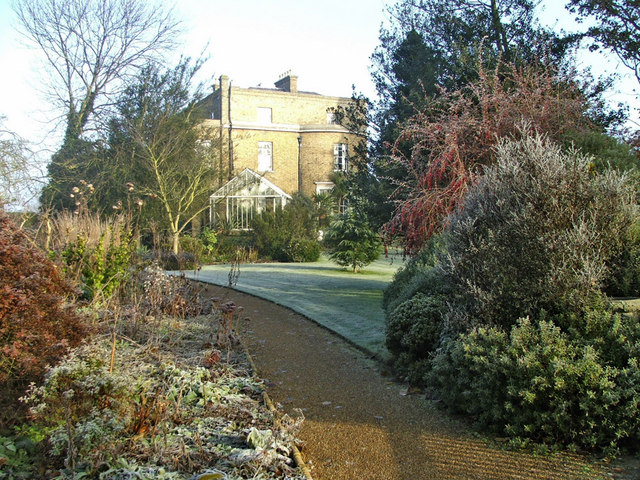
Myddelton House

Lee Valley Regional Park Authority (LVRPA) is a statutory body that is responsible for managing and developing the 26 miles (42 km) long, 10,000 acres (4,000 ha) Lee Valley Regional Park. The park was established by Parliament of the United Kingdom in 1967. The headquarters of the authority are in Myddelton House, Bulls Cross in the London Borough of Enfield, well known in the horticultural world for the gardens developed by E.A. Bowles (1865–1954) and still fully maintained and open to the public.

== History ==
Lee Valley Regional Park Act 1966
- Act of Parliament
- Parliament of the United Kingdom
- Long title: An Act to establish the Lee Valley Regional Park Authority for the development, preservation and management for recreation, sport, entertainment and the enjoyment of leisure of an area adjoining the river Lee as a regional park; to confer further powers upon the said authority and certain other authorities, bodies and persons; to enact provisions in connection with the matters aforesaid; and for other purposes.
- Citation: 1966 c. xli

Dates
- Royal assent: 21 December 1966

Status: Current legislation

Text of statute as originally enacted

The idea for a regional park was first suggested by Sir Patrick Abercrombie in his Greater London Plan of 1944. However, the plan remained dormant till 1961, when Lou Sherman, Mayor of Hackney took up the challenge to regenerate the Lea Valley. He persuaded 17 other local authorities to support him. In 1963 the Civic Trust was invited to make an appraisal of the valley's resources, their report was positive. A bill was put to Parliament to establish the Lee Valley Regional Park Authority. Following royal assent to the Lee Valley Regional Park Act 1966 (c. xli) in December 1966, the authority was formally constituted on 1 January 1967.

== Governance ==
Lee Valley Regional Park Authority has an appointed board of 28 members. 20 of those are from riparian authorities (those whose borders are crossed by the park's boundaries) and a further eight are appointed through local councils to represent the remaining 27 London Boroughs.

Members are elected for a term of appointment of four years and continue in office for that period unless they resign or cease to be a councillor.

The authority is overseen by an executive committee who assist the decision-making processes of the board. The six-person executive committee represents the diverse political and geographic backgrounds of the board, with half the members from London's 33 boroughs and half from Essex and Hertfordshire.

== Finance ==
The park authority is in part funded by a levy (not a precept) on Council Tax bills in Essex, Greater London and Hertfordshire.

== London 2012 Olympics and London 2012 Paralympics ==
Lee Valley Regional Park Authority own three London 2012 Olympic venues – Lee Valley White Water Centre in Waltham Cross, Hertfordshire and Lee Valley VeloPark and Lee Valley Hockey and Tennis Centre, both of which are located on Queen Elizabeth Olympic Park. From April 2015 these venues have been operated by Lee Valley Leisure Trust, a body which has been created by the authority to run its major sport and leisure sites.
